= Grumman F-14 Tomcat =

American carrier-based multi-role fighter aircraft family

F-14 Tomcat
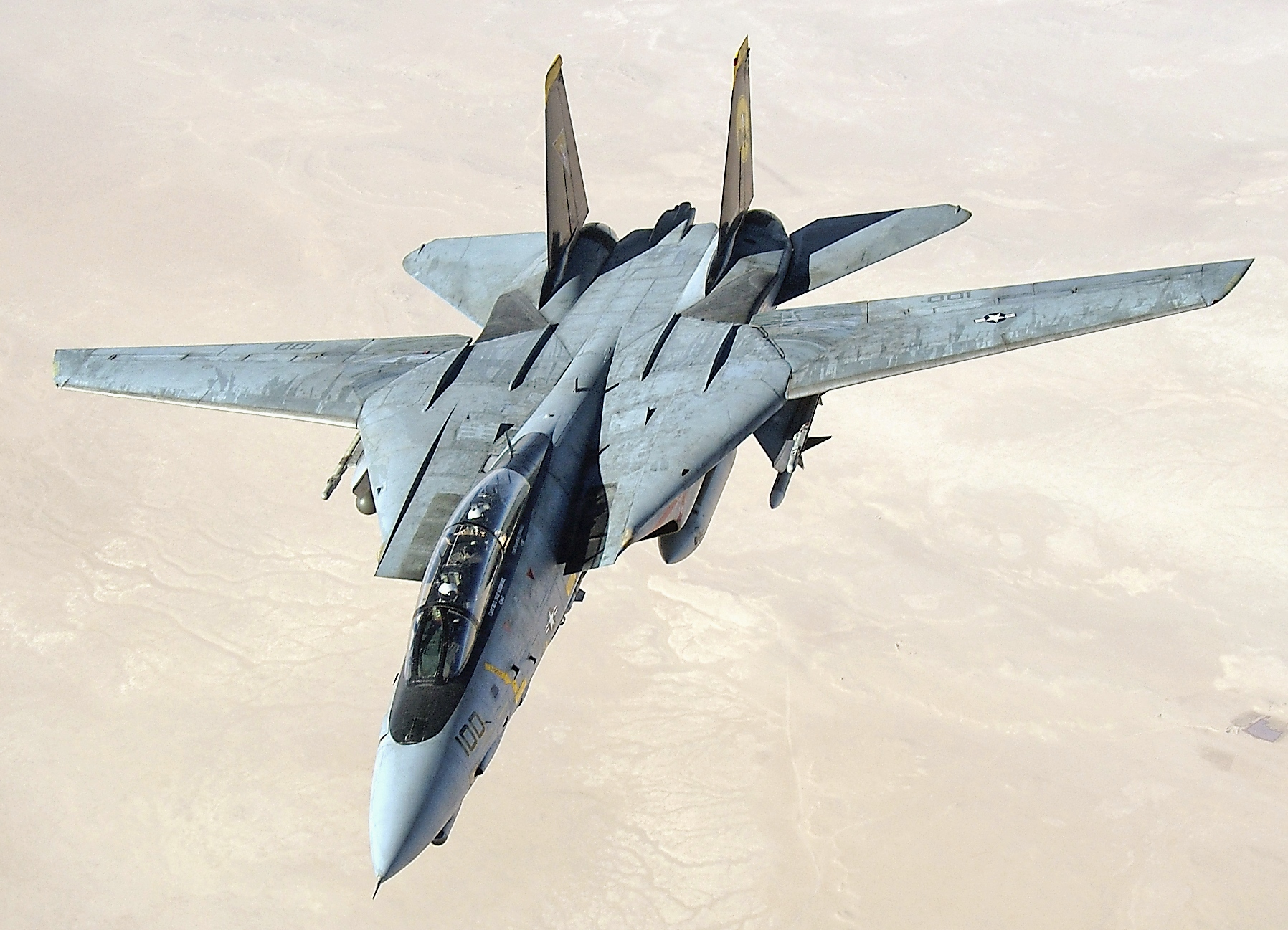
- A U.S. Navy F-14D conducts a mission over the Persian Gulf region in 2005

General information
- Type: Interceptor, air superiority, and multirole fighter
- National origin: United States
- Manufacturer: Grumman
- Status: In service with Iran
- Primary users: United States Navy (historical): Imperial Iranian Air Force (historical); Islamic Republic of Iran Air Force
- Number built: 712

History
- Manufactured: 1969–1991
- Introduction date: 22 September 1974; 52 years ago
- First flight: 21 December 1970; 55 years ago
- Retired: 22 September 2006; 20 years ago (United States Navy)

The Grumman F-14 Tomcat is an American carrier-capable supersonic, twin-engine, tandem two-seat, twin-tail, all-weather-capable variable-sweep wing fighter aircraft. The Tomcat was developed for the United States Navy's Naval Fighter Experimental (VFX) program after the collapse of the General Dynamics-Grumman F-111B project. A large and well-equipped fighter, the F-14 was the first of the American Teen Series fighters that were designed incorporating air combat experience against smaller, more maneuverable MiG fighters during the Vietnam War.

The F-14 first flew on 21 December 1970 and made its first deployment in 1974 with the U.S. Navy aboard the aircraft carrier USS Enterprise, replacing the McDonnell Douglas F-4 Phantom II. The F-14 served as the U.S. Navy's primary maritime air superiority fighter, fleet defense interceptor, and tactical aerial reconnaissance platform into the 2000s. The Low Altitude Navigation and Targeting Infrared for Night (LANTIRN) pod system was added in the 1990s and the Tomcat began performing precision ground-attack missions. The Tomcat was retired by the U.S. Navy on 22 September 2006, supplanted by the Boeing F/A-18E/F Super Hornet. Several retired F-14s have been put on display across the United States.

Having been exported to Pahlavi Iran under the Western-aligned Shah Mohammad Reza Pahlavi in 1976, F-14s were used as land-based interceptors by the Imperial Iranian Air Force. Following the Iranian Revolution in 1979, the Islamic Republic of Iran Air Force used them during the Iran–Iraq War. Iran claimed their F-14s shot down at least 160 Iraqi aircraft during the war (with 55 of these confirmed), while 16 Tomcats were lost, including seven losses to accidents.

== Development ==
=== Background ===
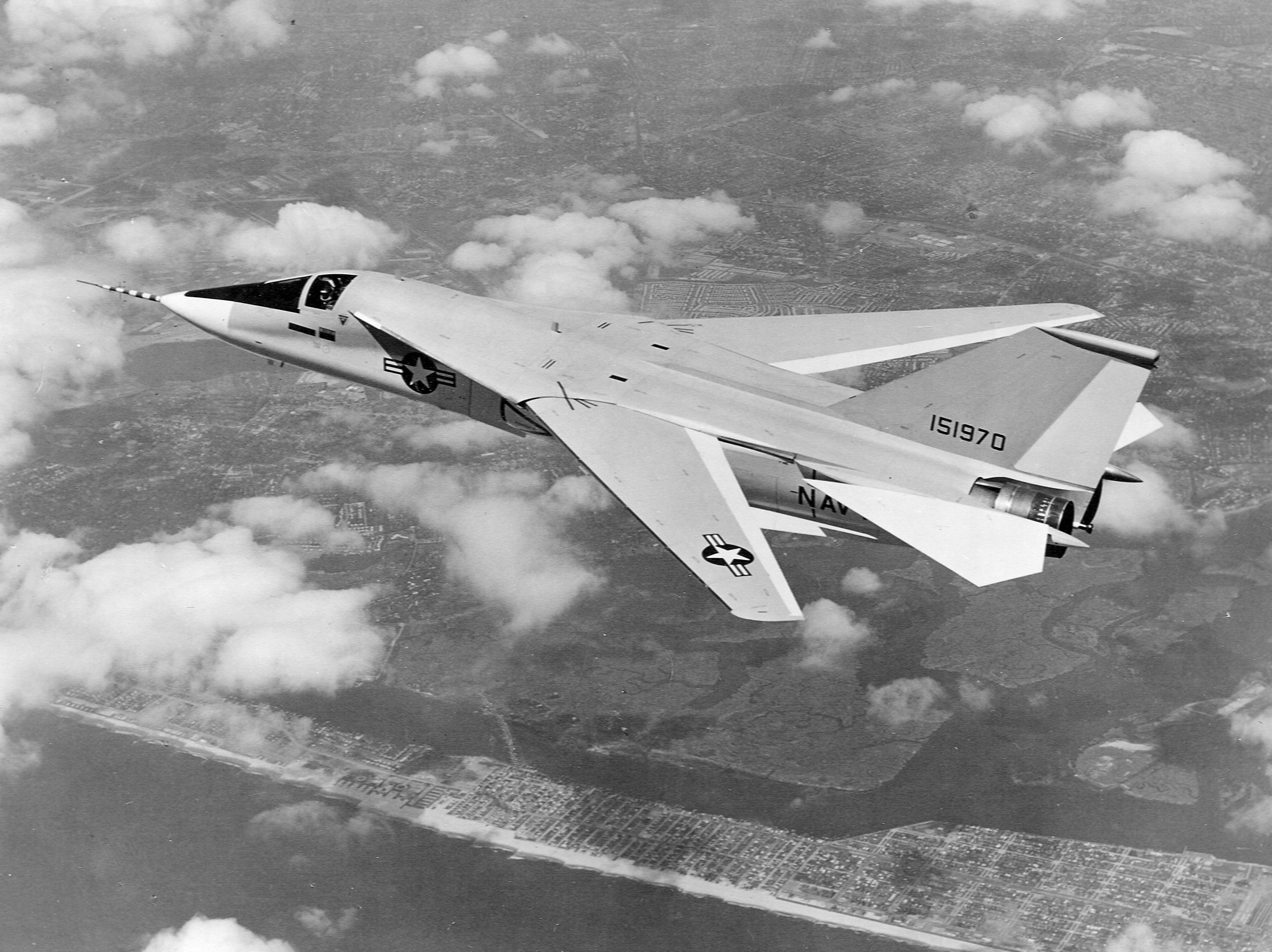
The F-111B was designed to fulfill the carrier-based interceptor role, but had weight and performance problems, and was not suited to the types of aerial combat that were predominant over Vietnam.

Beginning in the late 1950s, the U.S. Navy sought a long-range, high-endurance interceptor to defend its carrier battle groups against long-range anti-ship missiles launched from the jet bombers and submarines of the Soviet Union. They outlined the idea of a Fleet Air Defense (FAD) aircraft with a more powerful radar and longer range missiles than the F-4 Phantom II to intercept both enemy bombers and missiles at very long range. Studies into this concept led to the Douglas F6D Missileer project of 1959, but this large subsonic aircraft would have limited ability to evade supersonic fighters or defend itself once it fired its missiles, and the project was canceled in December 1961.

The Navy still sought long-range defensive aircraft, but with higher performance than the Missileer. The Navy was directed to participate in the Tactical Fighter Experimental (TFX) program with the U.S. Air Force (USAF) by Secretary of Defense Robert McNamara, who favored versatile aircraft that could be shared by both services, reducing procurement and development costs. To this end, he had already directed the USAF to buy the F-4 Phantom II—which was developed for the Navy and could serve both as a fighter-bomber and an interceptor aircraft—instead of buying more F-105 Thunderchief and F-106 Delta Dart aircraft to fill each respective role.

The TFX had adequate speed, range and payload for the FAD role, but was designed primarily as a fighter-bomber and interdictor that lacked the maneuverability and overall performance that the Navy expected. The Navy strenuously opposed the TFX as it feared compromises necessary for the Air Force's need for a low-level attack aircraft would adversely impact the aircraft's performance as a fighter. Their concerns were overridden, and the project went ahead as the F-111B. Lacking recent experience in naval fighters, the F-111's main contractor, General Dynamics, partnered with Grumman to provide the experience needed to develop a naval version. Weight and performance issues plagued the program, and with the F-111B in distress, Grumman began studying improvements and alternatives. In 1966, the Navy awarded Grumman a contract to begin studying advanced fighter designs. Grumman narrowed down these designs to its Model 303 design.

Through this same period, experience in Vietnam against the more agile MiG fighters demonstrated that the Phantom lacked the maneuverability needed to win in any engagement. This led to the VFAX program to study new fighter aircraft that would either replace or supplant the Phantom in the fighter and ground-attack roles while the TFX worked the long-range interception role. Grumman continued work on its 303 design and offered it to the Navy in 1967, which led to fighter studies by the Navy. The company continued to refine the design into 1968.

Around this time, Vice Admiral Thomas F. Connolly, Deputy Chief of Naval Operations for Air Warfare, flew the developmental F-111A variant on a flight and discovered that it had difficulty going supersonic and had poor carrier landing characteristics. He later testified before Congress about his concerns against the official Navy position and, in May 1968, Congress stopped funding for the F-111B, allowing the Navy to pursue an answer tailored to its requirements.

=== VFX ===
Free to choose their solution to the FAD requirement, VFAX ended in favor of a new design that would combine the two roles. In July 1968, the Naval Air Systems Command (NAVAIR) issued a request for proposals (RFP) for the Naval Fighter Experimental (VFX) program. VFX called for a tandem two-seat, twin-engine air-to-air fighter with a maximum speed of Mach 2.2. It would also have a built-in 20 mm M61 Vulcan cannon and a secondary close air support role. The VFX's air-to-air missiles would be either six AIM-54 Phoenix or a combination of six AIM-7 Sparrow and four AIM-9 Sidewinder missiles. Bids were received from General Dynamics, Grumman, Ling-Temco-Vought, McDonnell Douglas, and North American Rockwell; four bids incorporated variable-geometry wings. (Note: Admiral Thomas F. Connolly wrote the chapter, "The TFX – One Fighter For All".)

The name "Tomcat" was partially chosen to pay tribute to Connolly, as the nickname "Tom's Cat" had already been widely used within the program during development to reflect Connolly's involvement, and now the moniker was adapted into an official name in line with the Grumman tradition of giving its fighter aircraft feline names. Changing it to Tomcat associated the aircraft with the previous Grumman aircraft Wildcat, Hellcat, Tigercat, and Bearcat propeller fighters along with the Panther, Cougar, and Tiger jet fighters. Other names considered were Alley Cat (considered inappropriate due to sexual connotations) and Seacat.

=== Full-scale development ===
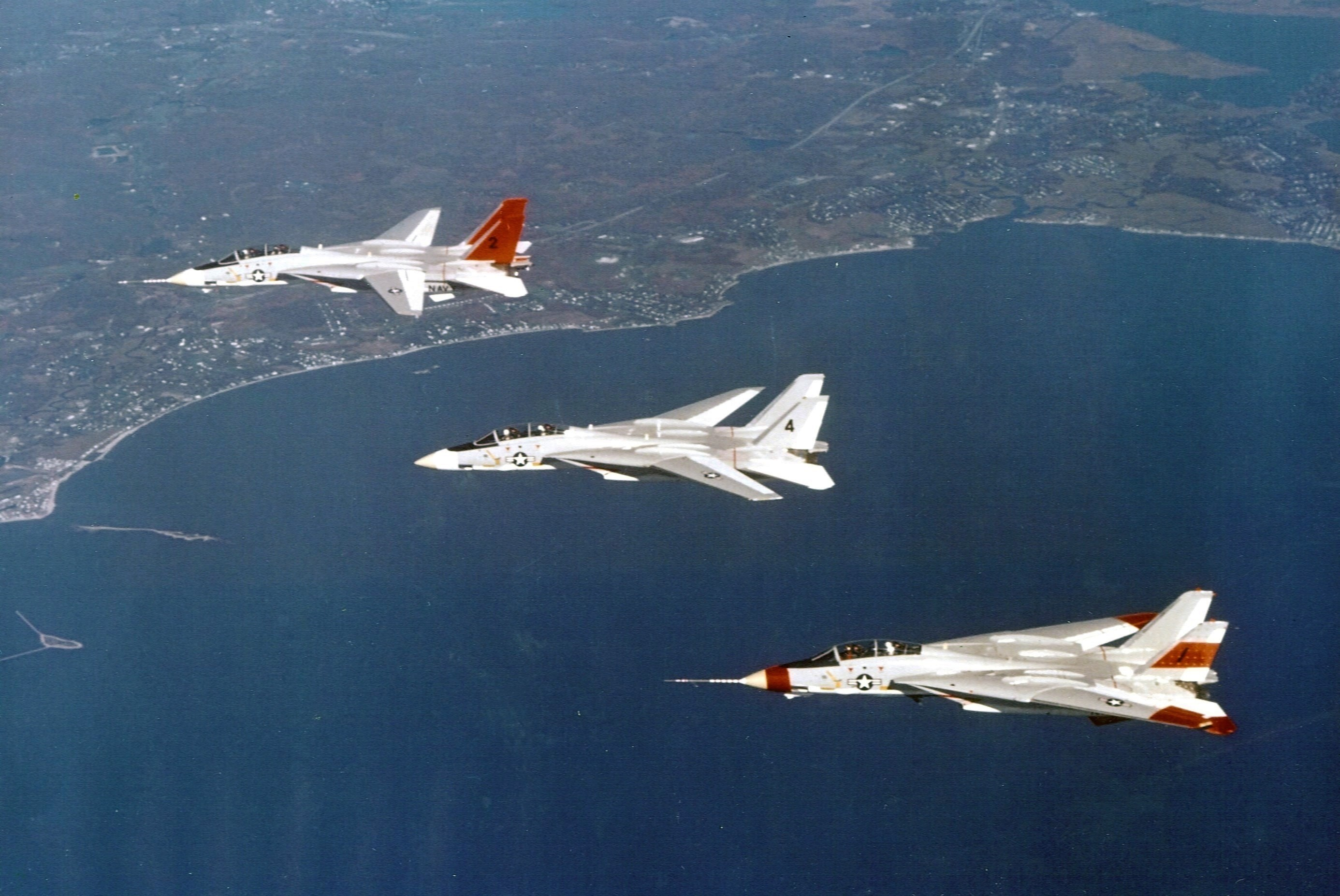
Grumman's VFX entry was designed around the TF30 engine, AWG-9 radar and AIM-54 missile intended for the F-111B; this eventually became the F-14A.

McDonnell Douglas and Grumman were selected as finalists in December 1968. Grumman's 303E design was selected for the contract award in January 1969. The design reused the TF30 engines from the F-111B, though the Navy planned on replacing them with the Pratt & Whitney F401-PW-400 engines under development for the Navy, along with the related Pratt & Whitney F100 for the USAF. Though lighter than the F-111B, it was still the largest and heaviest U.S. fighter to fly from an aircraft carrier, a consequence of the requirement to carry the large AWG-9 radar and AIM-54 Phoenix missiles (from the F-111B) and an internal fuel load of 16,000 lb (7,300 kg). The design service life was 6,000 flight hours, although this was later extended to 7,200 hours.

Upon winning the contract for the F-14, Grumman greatly expanded its Calverton, Long Island, New York facility for evaluating the aircraft. Much of the testing, including the first of many compressor stalls and multiple ejections, took place over Long Island Sound. To save time and avoid cancellation by the new presidential administration, the Navy skipped the prototype phase and jumped directly to full-scale development; the Air Force took a similar approach with its McDonnell Douglas F-15 Eagle. The F-14 first flew on 21 December 1970, just 22 months after Grumman was awarded the contract. The fighter reached initial operational capability (IOC) in 1973. The United States Marine Corps was initially interested in the F-14 as an F-4 Phantom II replacement, going so far as to send officers to Fighter Squadron One Twenty-Four (VF-124) to train as instructors. The Marine Corps pulled out of any procurement when the development of the stores' management system for ground attack munitions was not pursued and decided the upcoming F-18 fit their role better. An air-to-ground capability was not developed until the 1990s.

Firing trials involved launches against simulated targets of various types, from cruise missiles to high-flying bombers. AIM-54 Phoenix missile testing from the F-14 began in April 1972. The longest single Phoenix launch was successful against a target at a range of 110 nmi (200 km) in April 1973. Another unusual test was made on 22 November 1973, when six missiles were fired within 38 seconds at Mach 0.78 and 24,800 ft (7,600 m); four scored direct hits, one broke the lock and missed, and one was declared "no test" after the radar signature augmentation in the target drone (which increased the apparent radar signature of the tiny drone to the size of a MiG-21) failed, causing the missile to break track. This gave a tested success rate of 80% since effectively only 5 missiles were tested. This was the most expensive single test of air-to-air missiles ever performed at that time.

=== Improvements and changes ===
Throughout production, the F-14 underwent significant upgrades in missile armament, especially with the move to full solid-state electronics, primarily allowing for better Electronic counter-countermeasures (ECCM) and more space for the rocket motor. The AIM-54A Phoenix active-radar air-to-air missile was upgraded with the AIM-54B (1983, limited use) and AIM-54C (1986) versions. The initial AIM-7E-4 Sparrow semi-active radar homing was upgraded to the AIM-7F in 1976, and the M variant in 1982. The heat-seeking missile armament was upgraded from the AIM-9J/H to the joint Air Force/Navy missile, the AIM-9L in 1979, and then the AIM-9M in 1982.

The Tactical Airborne Reconnaissance Pod System (TARPS) was developed in the late 1970s for the F-14. Approximately 65 F-14As and all F-14Ds were modified to carry the pod. TARPS was primarily controlled by the Radar Intercept Officer (RIO) via an extra display for observing reconnaissance data. The "TARPS Digital (TARPS-DI)" was a 1996 upgrade featuring a digital camera. The digital camera was further updated beginning in 1998 with the "TARPS Completely Digital (TARPS-CD)" configuration that also provided real-time transmission of imagery.

In 1984, plans were announced to replace the existing TF30 engines of the Tomcat with General Electric F110-GE-400 turbofans. An initial, interim, version just replaced the TF30 with the new engine, retaining the original avionics. These aircraft were designated F-14A+, which was changed to F-14B in May 1991. 38 F-14Bs were newly built, with a further 43 converted from F-14As. The F-14D variant was developed at the same time; it included the F110 engines with newer digital avionics systems such as a glass cockpit and compatibility with the Link 16 secure datalink. 37 F-14Ds were new builds while another 18 were converted from F-14As. The Digital Flight Control System (DFCS) notably improved the F-14's handling qualities when flying at a high angle of attack or in air combat maneuvering.

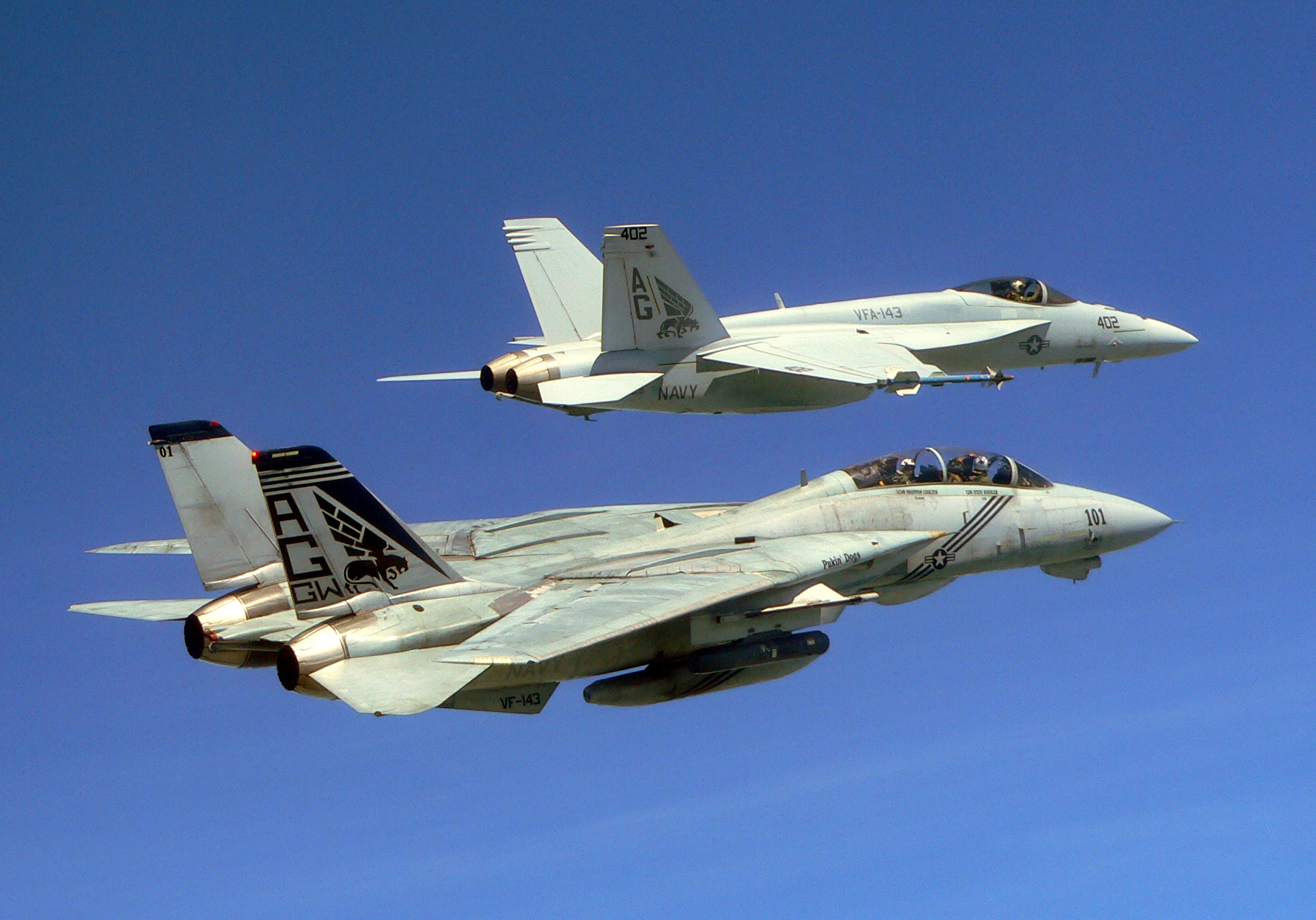
VFA-143 "Pukin Dogs" F-14B (in the foreground) and F/A-18E Super Hornet in 2005

While the F-14 had been developed as a lightweight alternative to the 80,000 lb (36,000 kg) F-111B, the F-14 was still the heaviest and most expensive fighter of its time. VFAX was revived in the 1970s as a lower cost solution to replacing the Navy and Marine Corps' fleets of F-4s, and A-7s. VFAX was directed to review the fighters in the USAF Light Weight Fighter competition, which led to the development of the McDonnell Douglas F/A-18 Hornet as roughly a midsize fighter and attack aircraft.

=== Ground attack upgrades ===
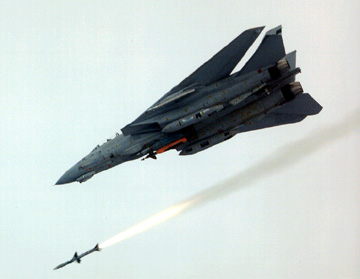
An F-14D launching an AIM-7 Sparrow; a GBU-10 Paveway II is also carried.

In the 1990s, with the pending retirement of the Grumman A-6 Intruder and the cancellation of the McDonnell Douglas A-12 Avenger II Advanced Tactical Aircraft (ATA), the F-14 air-to-ground program was resurrected. Trials with live bombs had been carried out in the 1980s; the F-14 was cleared to use basic iron bombs in 1992. During Operation Desert Storm of the Gulf War, most air-to-ground missions were left to LTV A-7 Corsair II, A-6 Intruder and F/A-18 Hornet squadrons, while the F-14s focused on air defense operations. Following Desert Storm, F-14As and F-14Bs underwent upgrades to avionics and cockpit displays to enable the use of precision munitions, enhance defensive systems, and apply structural improvements. The new avionics were comparable with the F-14D; these upgraded aircraft were designated F-14A (Upgrade) and F-14B (Upgrade) respectively.

By 1994, Grumman and the Navy were proposing ambitious plans for Tomcat upgrades beyond the D model (such as the Super Tomcat 21, the cheaper QuickStrike version, and the more advanced Attack Super Tomcat 21). However, the upgrades would have taken too long to implement to meet the gap, and were priced in the billions. The U.S. Congress considered this too expensive for an interim solution. A quick, inexpensive upgrade using the Low Altitude Navigation and Targeting Infrared for Night (LANTIRN) targeting pod was devised. The LANTIRN pod provided the F-14 with a forward-looking infrared (FLIR) camera for night operations and a laser target designator to direct laser-guided bombs (LGB). Although LANTIRN is traditionally a two-pod system, an AN/AAQ-13 navigation pod with terrain-following radar and a wide-angle FLIR, along with an AN/AAQ-14 targeting pod with a steerable FLIR and a laser target designator, the decision was made to only use the targeting pod. The Tomcat's LANTIRN pod was altered and improved over the baseline configuration, such as a Global Positioning System/Inertial Navigation System (GPS/INS) capability to allow an F-14 to accurately locate itself. The pod was carried on the right wing glove pylon.

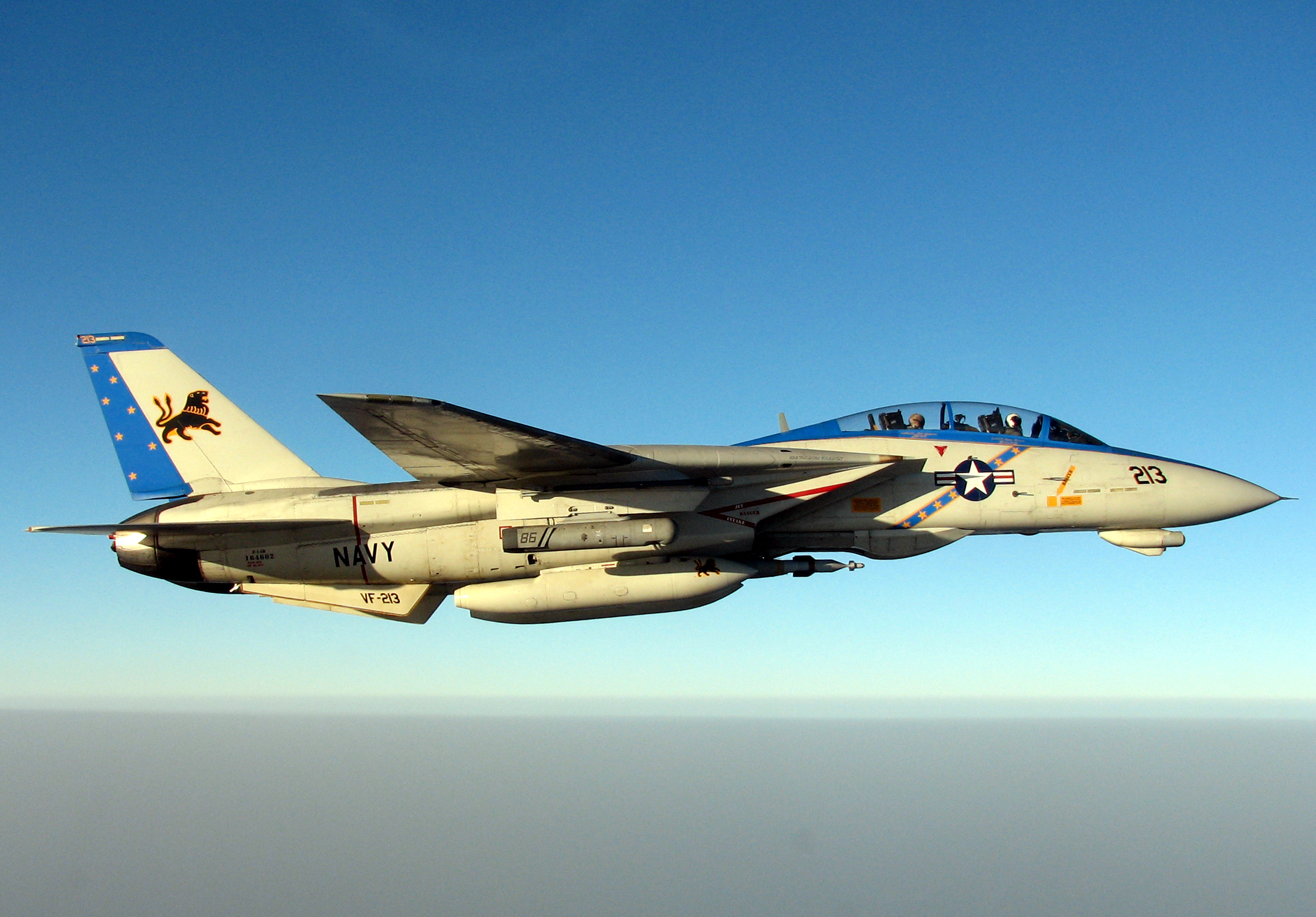
An F-14D(R) from VF-213 flying over Iraq on the last Tomcat deployment with a LANTIRN pod on the starboard wing glove station and a laser-guided bomb underneath the fuselage

The LANTIRN pod did not require changes to the F-14's own system software, but the pod was designed to operate on a MIL-STD-1553B bus not present on the F-14A or B. Consequently, Martin Marietta specially developed an interface card for LANTIRN. The Radar Intercept Officer (RIO) would receive pod imagery on a 10-inch Programmable Tactical Information Display (PTID) or another Multi-Function Display in the F-14 rear cockpit and guided LGBs using a new hand controller installed on the right side console. Initially, the hand controller replaced the RIO's TARPS control panel, meaning a Tomcat configured for LANTIRN could not carry TARPS and the reverse, but eventually a workaround was later developed to allow a Tomcat to carry LANTIRN or TARPS as needed.

An upgraded LANTIRN named "LANTIRN 40K" for operations up to 40,000 ft (12,000 m) was introduced in 2001, followed by Tomcat Tactical Targeting (T3) and Fast Tactical Imagery (FTI), to provide precise target coordinate determination and ability to transmit images in-flight. Tomcats also added the ability to carry the GBU-38 Joint Direct Attack Munition (JDAM) in 2003, giving it the option of a variety of LGB and GPS-guided weapons. Some F-14Ds were upgraded in 2005 with a ROVER III Full Motion Video (FMV) downlink, a system that transmits real-time images from the aircraft's sensors to the laptop of a forward air controller (FAC) on the ground.

=== Production termination ===
In the early 1980s, the Navy anticipated that an Advanced Carrier-Borne Multirole Fighter (VFMX) would eventually be the long term high-end replacement for both the F-14 and A-6, although this program was short-lived and was succeeded by separate efforts for fleet air defense and deep strike/attack; the latter would become the ATA program under which the A-12 Avenger II was being developed. In 1988, the service announced that it would procure a derivative of the Air Force's Advanced Tactical Fighter (ATF), named the Navy Advanced Tactical Fighter (NATF) that would eventually have been a navalized variant of the F-22, as the long term F-14 replacement. However, the collapse of the Soviet Union resulted in declining defense budgets and also in a steep increase in the unit cost of the ATF and NATF due to reduced production rates. With tightening budgets, the Navy chose to focus on its top aviation priority, the A-12, and canceled the NATF in 1991, believing that the F-14D with upgrades would be viable for fleet air defense until 2015. However, the A-12 was cancelled shortly afterwards due to cost overruns and technical problems. As a result, the Navy launched a new attack aircraft program, the Advanced-Attack (A-X), while the F-14 with LANTIRN and ground attack upgrades would provide some interim capabilities, with Grumman proposing even more F-14 upgrades in the 1990s.

From left to right, F-22, NATF, and Lockheed/Boeing A-X and A/F-X designs; the latter three were successive proposals for replacing the F-14.

Although the F-14D was to be the definitive version of the Tomcat, not all fleet units received the D variant. In 1989, Secretary of Defense Dick Cheney refused to approve the purchase of any more F-14D model aircraft, stopping production after 37 F-14Ds had been built, although 18 more were produced by conversion of F-14As, giving a total of 55 F-14Ds. An upgrade to the F-14D's computer software to allow AIM-120 AMRAAM missile capability was planned but was later terminated to free up funding for LANTIRN integration. While upgrades kept the F-14 competitive with other teen series fighters, Cheney stated that the F-14 was 1960s technology. Despite an appeal from the Secretary of the Navy for at least 132 F-14Ds and some aggressive proposals from Grumman for a replacement, Cheney planned to replace the F-14 with a fighter that was not manufactured by Grumman. According to Cheney, the F-14 was a "jobs program", and when the F-14 was canceled, an estimated 80,000 jobs of Grumman employees, subcontractors, or support personnel were affected. The Navy would end up procuring the F/A-18E/F Super Hornet as the interim strike fighter for the A-X, which had become A/F-X (Advanced Attack/Fighter) due to added fighter capabilities although A/F-X itself would be canceled in the 1993 Bottom-Up Review. Cheney's cancellation of the F-14D was controversial and contributed heavily to Grumman's decline and resulting acquisition by Northrop Corporation to form Northrop Grumman.

== Design ==
F-14 Tomcat flight demonstration video

The F-14 Tomcat was designed as both an air superiority fighter and a long-range naval interceptor, which enabled it to both serve as escort fighter aircraft when armed with Sparrow missiles and fleet air defense loitering interceptor role when armed with Phoenix missiles. The F-14 was designed with a two-seat cockpit with a bubble canopy which affords all-around visibility aiding aircrew in air-to-air combat. It features variable geometry wings that swing automatically during flight. For high-speed intercept, they are swept back and they swing forward for lower speed flight and increased endurance for loitering. It was designed to improve on the F-4 Phantom's air combat performance in most respects.

The F-14's fuselage and wings allow it to climb faster than the F-4, while the "twin-tail" empennage (dual vertical stabilizers with ventral fins on the engine nacelles) offers better stability. The F-14 is equipped with an internal 20 mm M61 Vulcan rotary cannon mounted on the left side (unlike the Phantom, which was not equipped with an internal gun in the US Navy), and can carry AIM-54 Phoenix, AIM-7 Sparrow, and AIM-9 Sidewinder anti-aircraft missiles. The twin engines are housed in widely spaced nacelles. The flat area of the fuselage between the nacelles is used to contain fuel and avionics systems, such as the wing-sweep mechanism and flight controls, as well as weaponry since the wings are not used for carrying ordnance. By itself, the fuselage provides approximately 40 to 60 percent of the F-14's aerodynamic lifting surface depending on the wing sweep position. The lifting body characteristics of the fuselage allowed one F-14 to safely land after suffering a mid-air collision that sheared off more than half of the plane's right wing in 1991.

The landing gear is very robust, in order to withstand catapult launches (takeoffs) and recoveries (landings) needed for carrier operations. It comprises a double nosewheel and widely spaced single main wheels. There are no hardpoints on the sweeping parts of the wings, and so all the armament is fitted on the belly between the air intake ramps and on pylons under the wing gloves. Internal fuel capacity is 2,400 US gal (9,100 L): 290 US gal (1,100 L) in each wing, 690 US gal (2,600 L) in a series of tanks aft of the cockpit, and a further 457 US gal (1,730 L) in two feeder tanks. It can carry two 267 US gal (1,010 L) external drop tanks under the engine intake ramps. There is also an air-to-air refueling probe, which folds into the starboard nose.

=== Variable-geometry wings and aerodynamic design ===
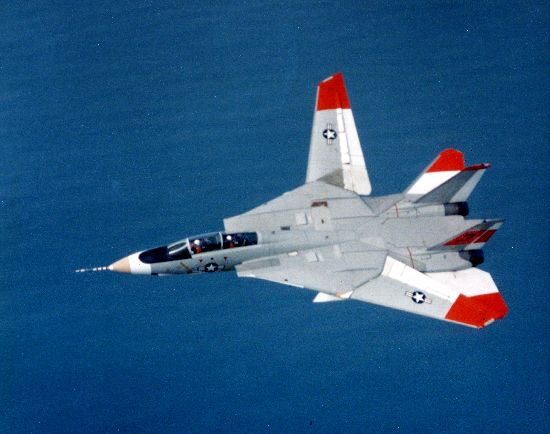
F-14 Tomcat with wings in asymmetric sweep during testing for this possible in-flight malfunction

The F-14's wing sweep can be varied between 20° and 68° in flight, and can be automatically controlled by its Central Air Data Computer (CADC), which maintains wing sweep at the optimum lift-to-drag ratio as the Mach number varies; pilots can manually override the system if desired. When parked, the wings can be "overswept" to 75° to overlap the horizontal stabilizers to save deck space aboard carriers. In an emergency, the F-14 can land with the wings fully swept to 68°, although this presents a significant safety hazard due to greatly increased stall speed. Such an aircraft would typically be diverted from an aircraft carrier to a land base if an incident did occur. The F-14 has flown safely with an asymmetrical wing-sweep during testing, and was deemed able to land aboard a carrier if needed in an emergency.

The wing pivot points are significantly spaced far apart. This has two benefits. The first is that weaponry can be fitted on a pylon on the fixed wing glove, liberating the wings from having swiveling pylons fitted, a feature which had proven to add significant drag on the F-111B. Since less of the total lifting area is variable, the center of lift moves less as the wings move, reducing trim drag at high speed. When the wing is swept back, its thickness-to-chord ratio decreases, which allows the aircraft to satisfy the Mach 2.4 top speed required by the U.S. Navy. The body of the aircraft contributes significantly to overall lift and so the Tomcat possesses a lower wing loading than its wing area would suggest. When carrying four Phoenix missiles or other heavy stores between the engines this advantage is lost and maneuverability is reduced in those configurations.

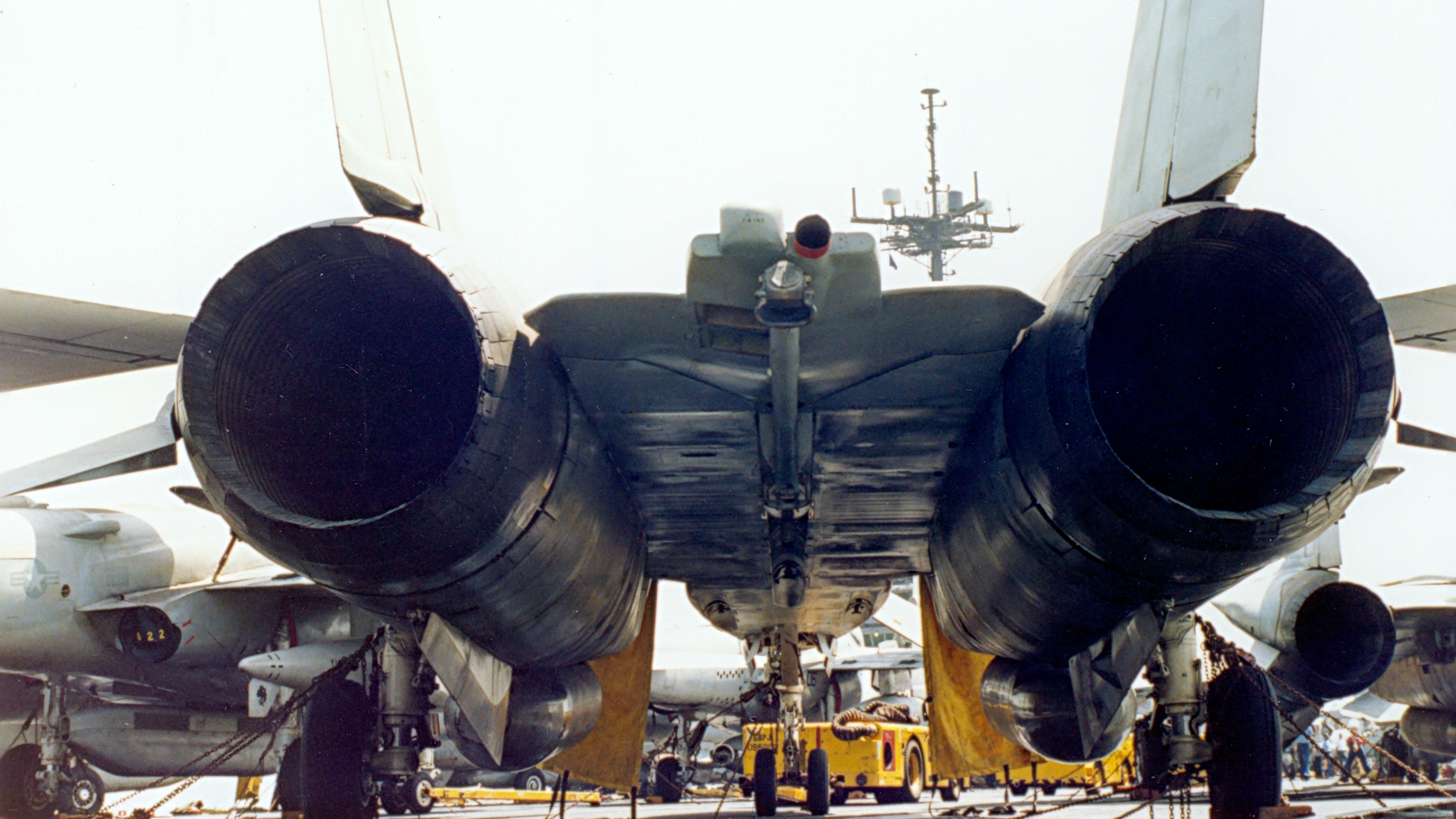
Rear view of the F-14 showing the area between the engine nacelles

Ailerons are not fitted, with roll control being provided by wing-mounted spoilers at low speed (which are disabled if the sweep angle exceeds 57°), and by differential operation of the all-moving tailerons at high speed. Full-span slats and flaps are used to increase lift both for landing and combat, with slats being set at 17° for landing and 7° for combat, while flaps are set at 35° for landing and 10° for combat. An air bag fills up the space occupied by the swept-back wing when the wing is in the forward position and a flexible fairing on top of the wing smooths out the shape transition between the fuselage and top wing area. The twin tail layout helps in maneuvers at high angle of attack (AoA) while reducing the height of the aircraft to fit within the limited roof clearance of hangars aboard aircraft carriers.

The wings have a two-spar structure with integral fuel tanks. Around 25% of the structure is made of titanium, including the wing box, wing pivots, and upper and lower wing skins; this is a light, rigid, and strong material. Electron beam welding was used in the construction of the titanium parts. The F-14 was designed for maneuver loads of 7.5 g, but this was usually limited to 6.5 g in the fleet to extend the aircraft's service life.

Two triangular shaped retractable surfaces, called glove vanes, were originally mounted in the forward part of the wing glove, and could be automatically extended by the flight control system at high Mach numbers. They were used to generate additional lift ahead of the aircraft's center of gravity, thus helping to compensate for mach tuck at supersonic speeds. Automatically deployed at above Mach 1.4, they allowed the F-14 to pull 7.5 g at Mach 2 and could be manually extended with wings swept full aft. They were later disabled, however, owing to their additional weight and complexity. The air brakes consist of top-and-bottom extendable surfaces at the rearmost portion of the fuselage, between the engine nacelles. The bottom surface is split into left and right halves; the tailhook hangs between the two-halves, an arrangement sometimes called the "castor tail".

=== Engines ===
The F-14A was initially equipped with two Pratt & Whitney TF30-P-412A (or JTF10A) augmented turbofan engines, each rated at 20,900 lb (93 kN) of static uninstalled thrust, which enabled the aircraft to attain a maximum speed of Mach 2.34. The F-14 would normally fly at a cruising speed for reduced fuel consumption, which was important for conducting lengthy patrol missions. The rectangular air inlets for the engines were equipped with movable ramps and bleed doors to meet the different airflow requirements of the engine from take-off to maximum supersonic speed. Variable nozzles were also fitted to the engine's exhaust. Late production F-14A had the improved TF30-P-414A engines. The Navy had originally planned to replace the TF30 with the Pratt & Whitney F401, the naval variant of the F-15's F100 engine and rated for 28,100 lbs (125 kN) of thrust, but this plan was ultimately canceled due to costs and reliability problems.

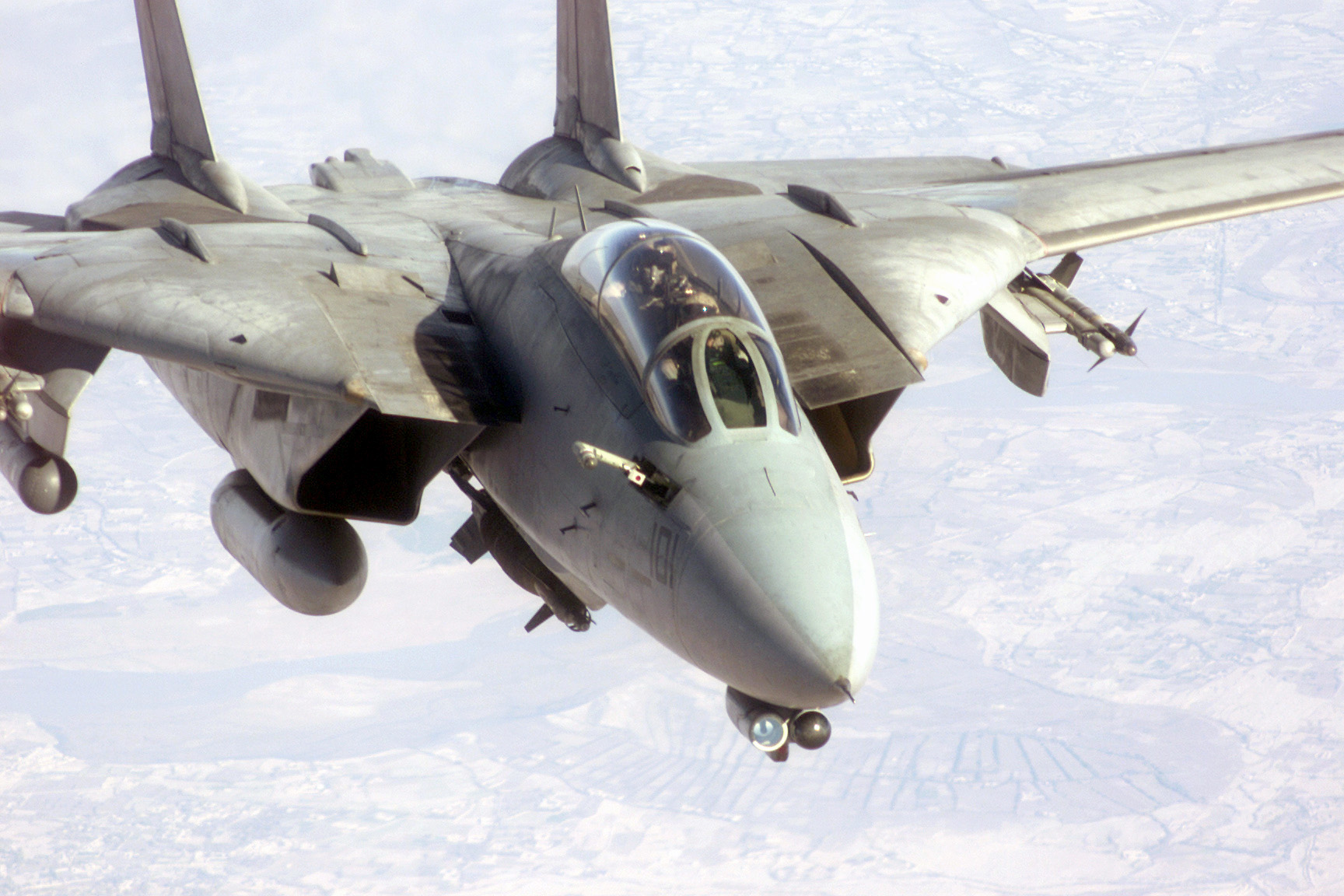
An F-14D prepares to refuel with probe extended

The performance of the TF30 engine became an object of criticism. John Lehman, Secretary of the Navy in the 1980s, told the U.S. Congress that the TF30/F-14 combination was "probably the worst engine/airframe mismatch we have had in years" and that the TF30 was "a terrible engine"; 28% of all F-14 accidents were attributed to the engine. The TF30 was originally designed for the flight envelope of bomber applications, so in air combat they proved extremely susceptible to compressor stalls especially at a high angle of attack and during rapid throttle transients or above 30,000 ft (9,100 m), which could easily result in loss of control, severe yaw oscillations, and could lead to an unrecoverable flat spin. A high frequency of turbine blade failures led to the reinforcement of the entire engine bay to limit damage from such failures. At specific altitudes, exhaust produced by missile launches could cause an engine compressor stall. This led to the development of a bleed system that temporarily blocks the frontal intake ramp and reduces engine power during missile launch.

The upgraded F-14A+, later redesignated F-14B, and F-14D were equipped with the General Electric F110-GE-400. The F110 provided a significant increase in thrust, with a static uninstalled thrust of 26,950 lbf (120 kN); installed thrust is 23,400 lbf (104 kN) with afterburner at sea level, which rose to 30,200 lbf (134 kN) at Mach 0.9. The increased thrust gave the Tomcat a better than 1:1 thrust-to-weight ratio at low fuel quantities, and the rate of climb was increased by 61%. The basic engine thrust without afterburner was powerful enough for carrier launches. While this did result in fuel savings, the main reason not to use afterburner during carrier launches was that if an engine failed the F110's thrust in full afterburner would produce a yawing moment too abruptly for the pilot to correct. Thus the launch of an F-14B or F-14D with afterburner was rare, while the F-14A required full afterburner unless very lightly loaded. The F110 was also more efficient, allowing the Tomcat to cruise comfortably above 30,000 ft (9,100 m), which increased its range and survivability as well as endurance for time on station. In the overland attack role, this gave the F-14B and F-14D 60% more striking range or one-third more time on station. The F-14B arrived in time to participate in Desert Storm.

With the TF30, the F-14's overall thrust-to-weight ratio at maximum takeoff weight is around 0.56, considerably less than the F-15A's ratio of 0.85; when fitted with the F110 engine, an improved thrust-to-weight ratio of 0.73 at maximum weight and 0.88 at normal takeoff weight was achieved. Despite having large differences in static thrust, the TF30-equipped F-14A and the F110-equipped F-14B and F-14D were rated at the same top speed. (Note: The F-14's maximum speed is limited by the scheduling of the inlet ramps, and the inlet ramp programming for the F110 was optimized more for transonic performance; at higher speeds, the installed dynamic thrust of the TF30 actually exceeds the F110's.)

In 1996, two F110-equipped Tomcats crashed after an afterburner failure. In the second crash, lighting the afterburner damaged the afterburner can's lining and led to an explosion. The Navy prohibited the use of afterburner on the F-14A+/B/D below 10,000 feet until GE could redesign the afterburners, a process that took over a year to complete.

=== Avionics and flight controls ===
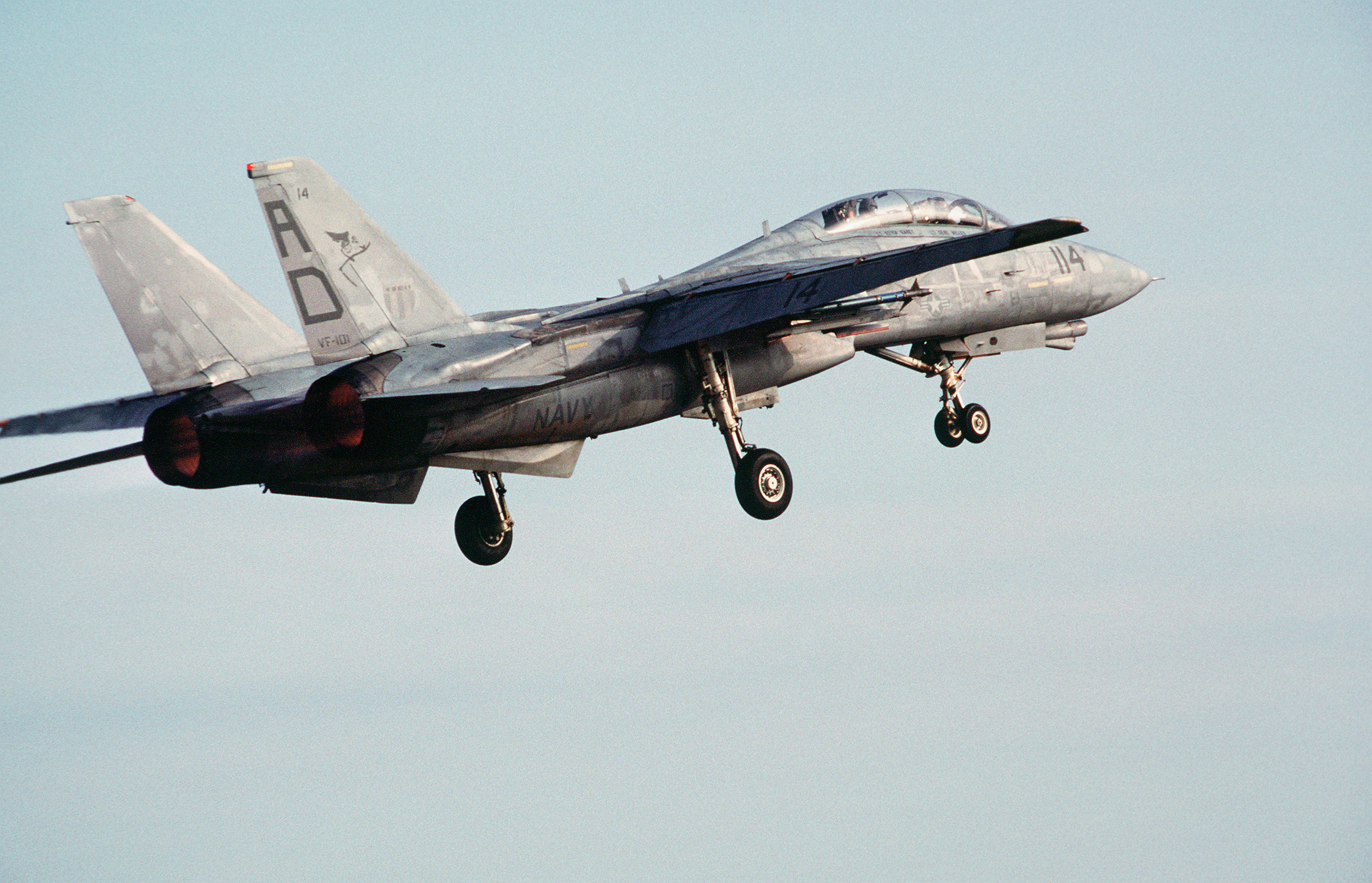
F-14 with landing gear deployed

The cockpit has two seats, arranged in tandem, outfitted with Martin-Baker GRU-7A rocket-propelled ejection seats, rated from zero altitude and zero airspeed up to 450 knots. The canopy is spacious, and fitted with four mirrors to effectively provide all-round visibility. Only the pilot has flight controls; the flight instruments themselves are of a hybrid analog-digital nature. The cockpit also features a head-up display (HUD) to show primarily navigational information; several other avionics systems such as communications and direction-finders are integrated into the AWG-9 radar's display. A feature of the F-14 is its Central Air Data Computer (CADC), designed by Garrett AiResearch, that forms the onboard integrated flight control system. It uses a MOSFET-based large-scale integration chipset, specifically the MP944 chip.

The aircraft's large nose contains a two-person crew and several bulky avionics systems. The main element is the Hughes AN/AWG-9 X band radar; the antenna is a 36 in (91 cm)-wide planar array, and has integrated Identification friend or foe antennas. The AWG-9 has several search and tracking modes, such as track while scan (TWS), range-while-search (RWS), pulse-Doppler single-target track (PDSTT), and jam angle track (JAT); a maximum of 24 targets can be tracked simultaneously, and six can be engaged in TWS mode up to around 60 mi (97 km). Cruise missiles are also possible targets with the AWG-9, which can lock onto and track small objects even at low altitude when in pulse-Doppler mode. For the F-14D, the AWG-9 was replaced by the upgraded APG-71 radar. The Joint Tactical Information Distribution System (JTIDS)/Link 16 for data communications was added later on.

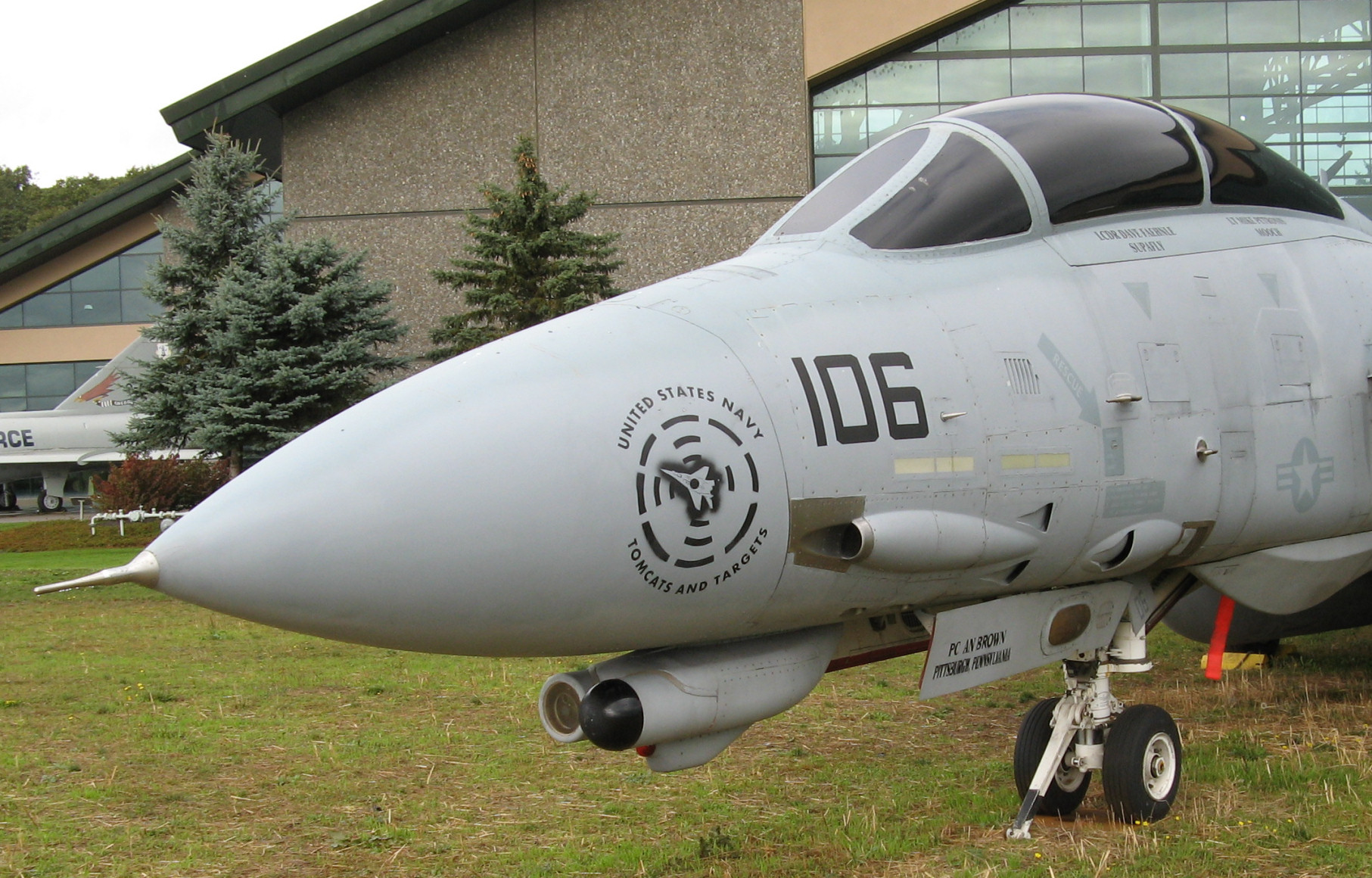
F-14D AN/AAS-42 IRST and the TCS camera placed side-by-side under the nose

The F-14 also features electronic countermeasures (ECM) and radar warning receiver (RWR) systems, chaff/flare dispensers, fighter-to-fighter data link, and a precise inertial navigation system. The early navigation system was inertial-based; point-of-origin coordinates were programmed into a navigation computer and gyroscopes would track the aircraft's every motion to calculate distance and direction from that starting point. Global Positioning System later was integrated to provide more precise navigation and redundancy in case either system failed. The chaff/flare dispensers are located on the underside of the fuselage and on the tail. The F-14 was initially equipped with the AN/ALR-45/50 RWR system, while later production aircraft were equipped with the AN/ALR-67; the RWR system consists of several antennas on the aircraft's fuselage, which can roughly calculate both direction and distance of enemy radar users; it can also differentiate between search radar, tracking radar, and missile-homing radar.

Featured in the sensor suite was the AN/ALR-23, an infrared search and track (IRST) sensor using indium antimonide detectors, mounted under the nose; however the system was unreliable and was replaced by an optical system, Northrop's AAX-1, also designated TCS (TV Set). The AAX-1 helps pilots visually identify and track aircraft, up to a range of 60 miles (97 km) for large aircraft. The radar and the AAX-1 are linked, allowing the one detector to follow the direction of the other. A dual infrared/optical detection system was adopted on the later F-14D, with the new AN/AAS-42 IRST and the TCS placed side-by-side.

=== Armament ===
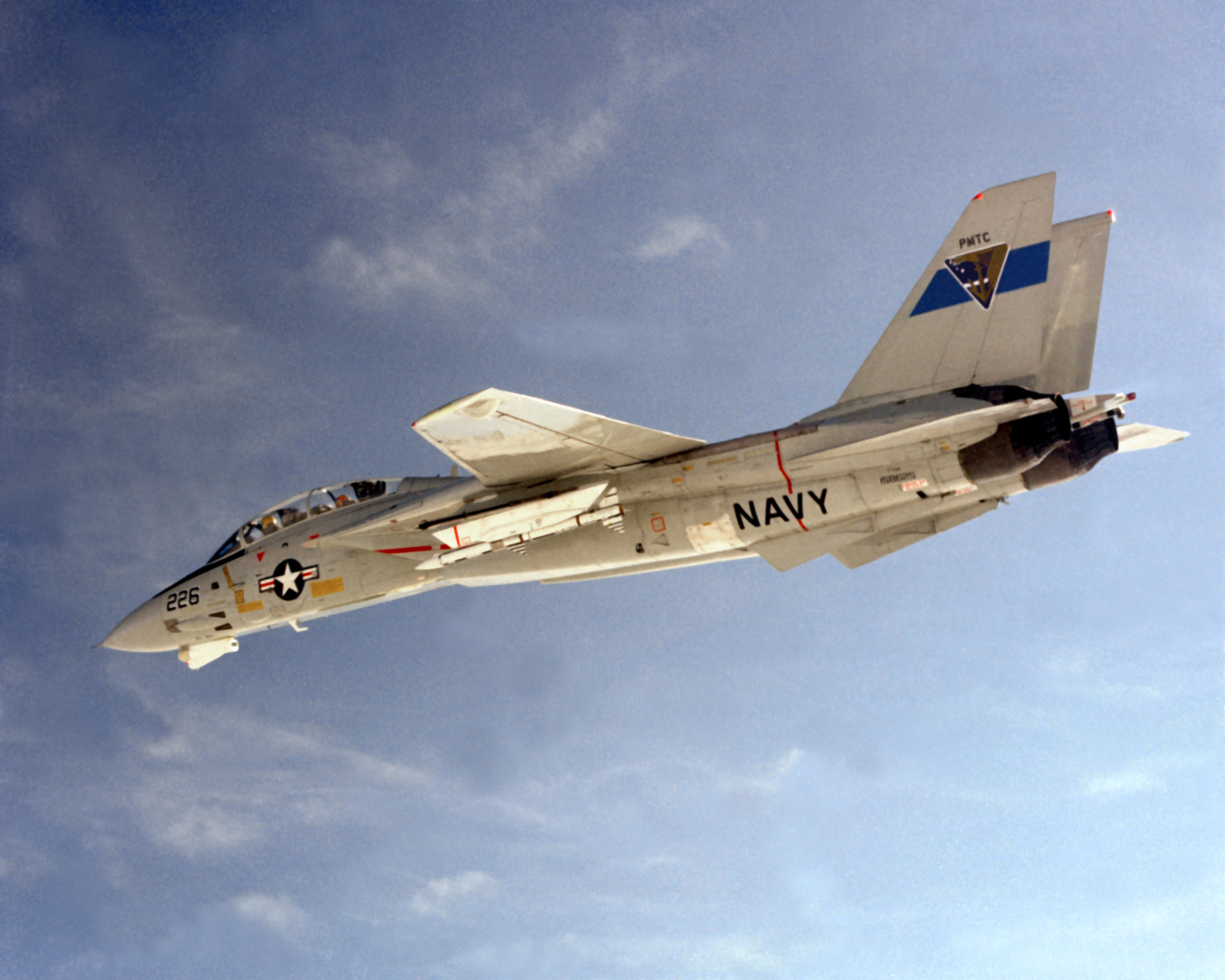
F-14 Tomcat carrying an AIM-120 AMRAAM during a 1982 test

The F-14 was designed to combat highly maneuverable aircraft as well as the Soviet anti-ship cruise missile and bomber (Tupolev Tu-16, Tupolev Tu-22, Tupolev Tu-22M) threats. The Tomcat was to be a platform for the AIM-54 Phoenix, but unlike the canceled F-111B, it could also engage medium- and short-range threats with other weapons. The F-14 is an air superiority fighter, not just a long-range interceptor aircraft. Over 6,700 kg (14,800 lb) of stores can be carried for combat missions on several hardpoints under the fuselage and under the wing gloves. Commonly, this means a maximum of four Phoenixes or Sparrows on the belly stations, two Phoenixes/Sparrows on the wing hardpoints, and two Sidewinders on the wing glove hardpoints. The F-14 is also fitted with an internal 20 mm M61 Vulcan rotary cannon. The Tomcat could also support MK-80 - MK-84 GBUs on its hardpoints. While in this configuration it was known to pilots as a "Bombcat".

Operationally, the capability to hold up to six Phoenix missiles was never used, although early testing was conducted; there was never a threat requirement to engage six hostile targets simultaneously and the load was too heavy to safely recover aboard an aircraft carrier in the event that the missiles were not fired. During the height of Cold War operations in the late 1970s and 1980s, the typical weapon loadout on carrier-deployed F-14s was usually two AIM-54 Phoenixes, augmented by two AIM-9 Sidewinders, three AIM-7 Sparrows, a full loadout of 20 mm ammunition and two drop tanks. The Phoenix missile was used twice in combat by the U.S. Navy, both over Iraq in 1999, but the missiles did not score any kills. According to retired RIO Dave Baranek, the first two launch failures, on January 5, 1999, occurred when two F-14D Super Tomcats, carrying AIM-54Cs, fired two Phoenix missiles at a pair of MiG-23 jets. The missiles' rocket motors did not ignite because they were improperly armed prior to launch from the carrier. However, as two F/A-18s chased the two MiG-23s, one MiG-23 ran out of fuel and crashed, killing the pilot. The US Navy did not claim a kill, but Captain James T. Knight, commander of CVW-11, said "Screw him...a kill is a kill." On 14 September 1999, an F-14D assigned to CVW-2 aboard the aircraft carrier USS Constellation fired an AIM-54C missile at a MiG-23 at very long range. The MiG-23 quickly turned and fled, and was able to outrun the missile. Lieutenant Commander Coby "Coach" Loessberg, the Super Tomcat's pilot, commented afterward that had the Tomcat been closer to the center of the envelope, at optimal speed and altitude, a kill would have been more likely.

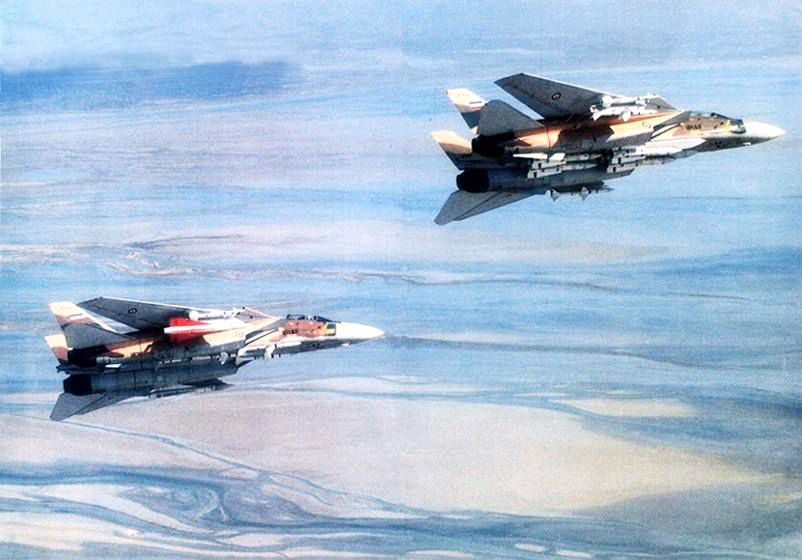
Two Iranian Tomcats equipped with multiple missiles, c. 1986, in the midst of a project to adapt I-Hawk surface-to-air missiles for F-14s

Iran made use of the Phoenix system, claiming dozens of kills with it during the 1980–1988 Iran–Iraq War. Due to the shortage of air-to-air missiles as a result of sanctions, Iran tried to use other missiles on the Tomcat. It attempted to integrate the Russian R-27R "Alamo" BVR missile, but was apparently unsuccessful. In 1985, Iran started Project Sky Hawk, attempting to adapt I-Hawk surface-to-air missiles, which Iran had in its inventory, for F-14s. The modified missiles were successfully tested in 1986 and one or two were used in combat, but the project was abandoned due to guidance problems.

== Operational history ==
=== United States ===
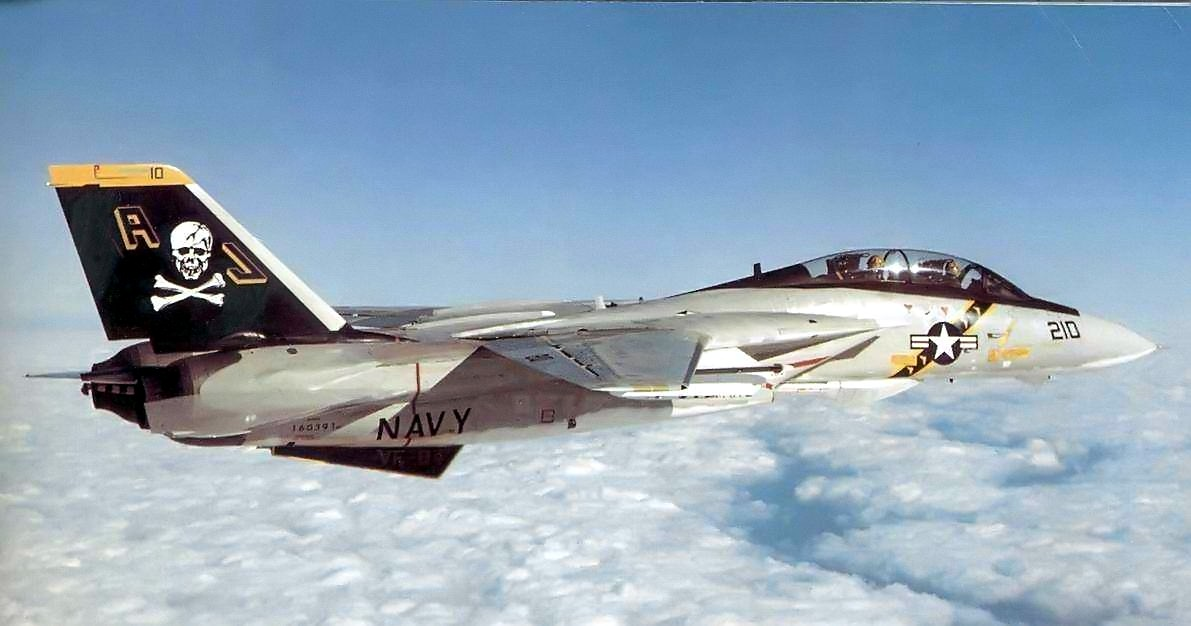
An F-14A of VF-84 Jolly Rogers, in a 1970s color scheme, circa 1978

The F-14 began replacing the F-4 Phantom II in U.S. Navy service starting in September 1974 with squadrons VF-1 "Wolfpack" and VF-2 "Bounty Hunters" aboard USS Enterprise and participated in the American withdrawal from Saigon. The F-14 had its first kills in U.S. Navy service on 19 August 1981 over the Gulf of Sidra in what is known as the Gulf of Sidra incident. In that engagement, two F-14s from VF-41 Black Aces were engaged by two Libyan Su-22 "Fitters". The F-14s evaded the Libyan missile and returned fire, downing both Libyan aircraft with AIM-9L Sidewinders. U.S. Navy F-14s once again were pitted against Libyan aircraft on 4 January 1989, when two F-14s from VF-32 shot down two Libyan MiG-23 "Floggers" over the Gulf of Sidra in a second Gulf of Sidra incident.

Its first sustained combat use was as a photo reconnaissance platform. The Tomcat was selected to inherit the reconnaissance mission upon the departure of the dedicated North American RA-5C Vigilante and Vought RF-8G Crusaders from the fleet. A large pod called the Tactical Airborne Reconnaissance Pod System (TARPS) was developed and fielded on the Tomcat in 1981. With the retirement of the last RF-8G Crusaders in 1982, TARPS F-14s became the U.S. Navy's primary tactical reconnaissance system. One of two Tomcat squadrons per airwing was designated as a TARPS unit and received 3 TARPS capable aircraft.

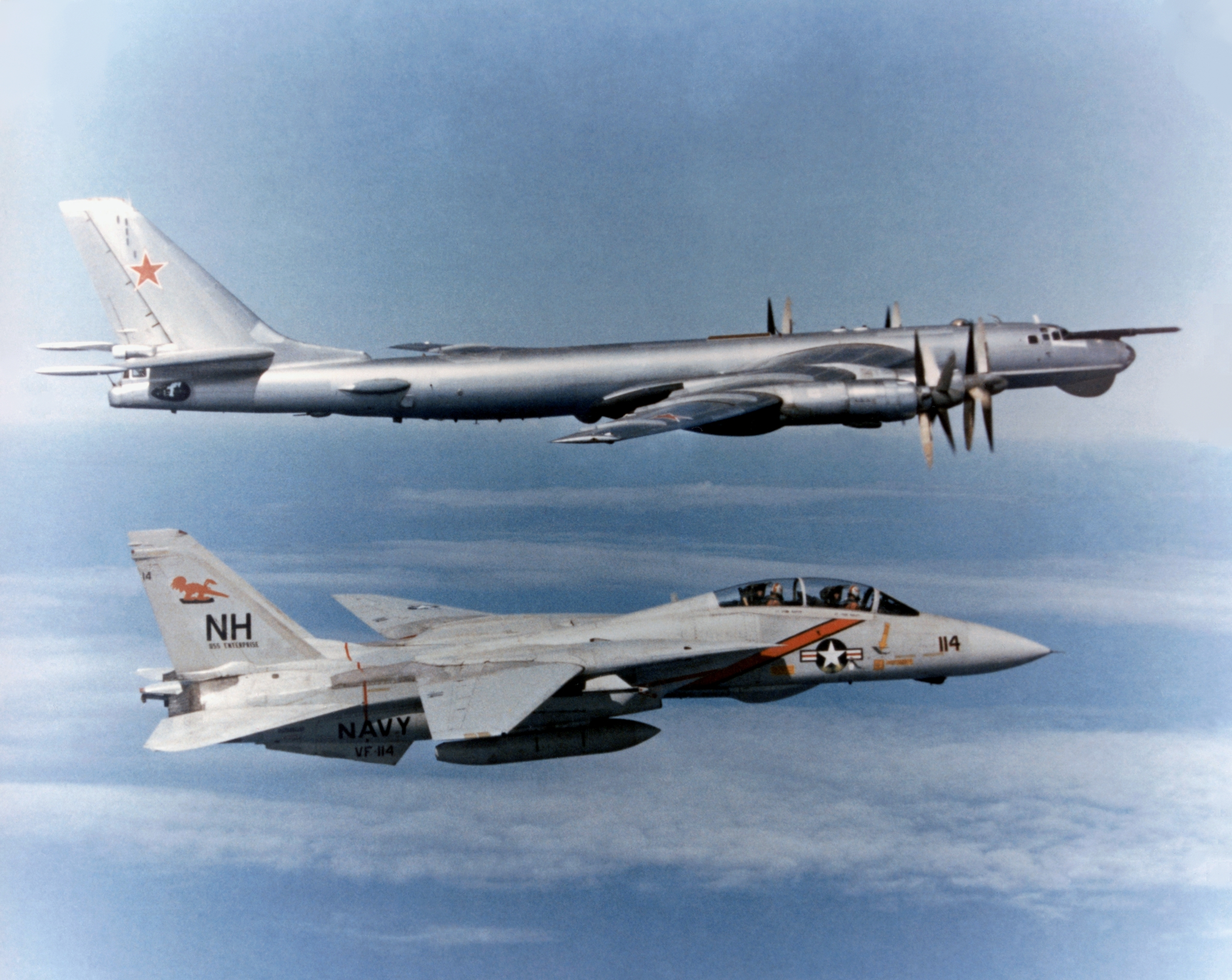
An F-14A from VF-114 intercepting a Soviet Tu-95RT "Bear-D" maritime reconnaissance aircraft

While the Tomcat was being used by Iran in combat against Iraq in its intended air superiority mission in the early 1980s, the U.S. Navy found itself flying regular daily combat missions over Lebanon to photograph activity in the Bekaa Valley. At the time, the Tomcat had been thought too large and vulnerable to be used over land, but the need for imagery was so great that Tomcat aircrews developed high-speed medium altitude tactics to deal with considerable AAA and SA-7 SAM threat in the Bekaa area. The first exposure of a Navy Tomcat to an SA-2 missile was over Somalia in April 1983 when a local battery was unaware of two Tomcats scheduled for a TARPS mission in a prelude to an upcoming international exercise in the vicinity of Berbera. An SA-2 was fired at the second Tomcat while conducting 10,000 ft (3,000 m) mapping profile at max conserve setting. The Tomcat aircrews spotted the missile launch and dove for the deck thereby evading it without damage. The unexpected demand for combat TARPS laid the way for high altitude sensors such as the KA-93 Long Range Optics (LOROP) to be rapidly procured for the Tomcat as well as an Expanded Chaff Adapter (ECA) to be incorporated in an AIM-54 Phoenix Rail. Commercial "fuzz buster" type radar detectors were also procured and mounted in pairs in the forward cockpit as a stop gap solution to detect SAM radars such as the SA-6. The ultimate solution was an upgrade to the ALR-67 then being developed, but it would not be ready until the advent of the F-14A+ later in the 1980s.

An F-14A of VF-32 during Operation Desert Storm with a KC-135 Stratotanker and two EA-6B Prowlers in the background

The participation of the F-14 in the 1991 Operation Desert Storm consisted of Combat Air Patrol (CAP) over the Red Sea and the Persian Gulf and overland missions consisting of strike escort and reconnaissance. Until the waning days of Desert Storm, in-country air superiority was tasked to USAF F-15 Eagles due to the way the Air Tasking Orders (ATO) delegated primary overland CAP stations to the F-15. The governing Rules of Engagement (ROE) also dictated a strict Identification Friend or Foe (IFF) requirement when employing Beyond Visual Range weapons such as the AIM-7 Sparrow and particularly the AIM-54 Phoenix. This hampered the Tomcat from using its most powerful weapon. Furthermore, the powerful emissions from the AWG-9 radar are detectable at great range with a radar warning receiver. Iraqi fighters routinely retreated as soon as the Tomcats "lit them up" with the AWG-9. The U.S. Navy suffered its only F-14 loss from enemy action on 21 January 1991 when BuNo 161430, an F-14A upgraded to an F-14A+, from VF-103 was shot down by an SA-2 surface-to-air missile while on an escort mission near Al Asad airbase in Iraq. Both crew members survived ejection with the pilot being rescued by USAF Special Operation Forces and the RIO being captured by Iraqi troops as a POW until the end of the war. An aircraft from VF-1 also achieved the F-14's final kill in US service, a Mi-8 "Hip" helicopter, with an AIM-9 Sidewinder.

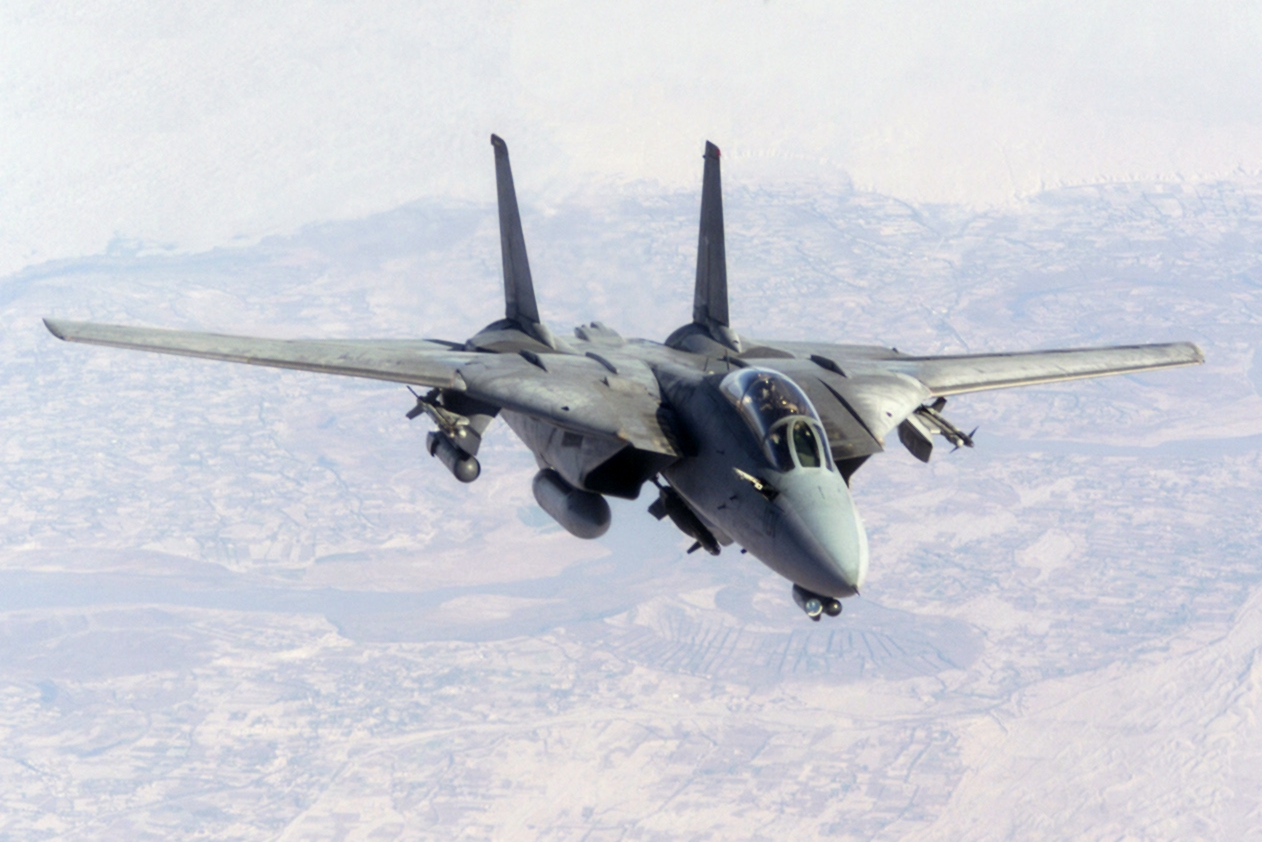
A Navy F-14D flying over the skies of Afghanistan on a precision bombing mission in November 2001

In 1995, F-14s from VF-14 and VF-41 participated in Operation Deliberate Force as well as Operation Allied Force in 1999, and in 1998, VF-32 and VF-213 participated in Operation Desert Fox. On 15 February 2001, the Joint Direct Attack Munition (JDAM) was added to the Tomcat's arsenal. On 7 October 2001, F-14s would lead some of the first strikes into Afghanistan marking the start of Operation Enduring Freedom and the first F-14 drop of a JDAM occurred on 11 March 2002. F-14s from VF-2, VF-31, VF-32, VF-154, and VF-213 would also participate in Operation Iraqi Freedom. The F-14Ds of VF-2, VF-31, and VF-213 obtained JDAM capability in March 2003. On 10 December 2005, the F-14Ds of VF-31 and VF-213 were upgraded with a ROVER III downlink for transmitting images to a ground Forward Air Controller (FAC). The Navy decided to retire the F-14 with the F/A-18E/F Super Hornet filling the roles of fleet defense and strike formerly filled by the F-14.

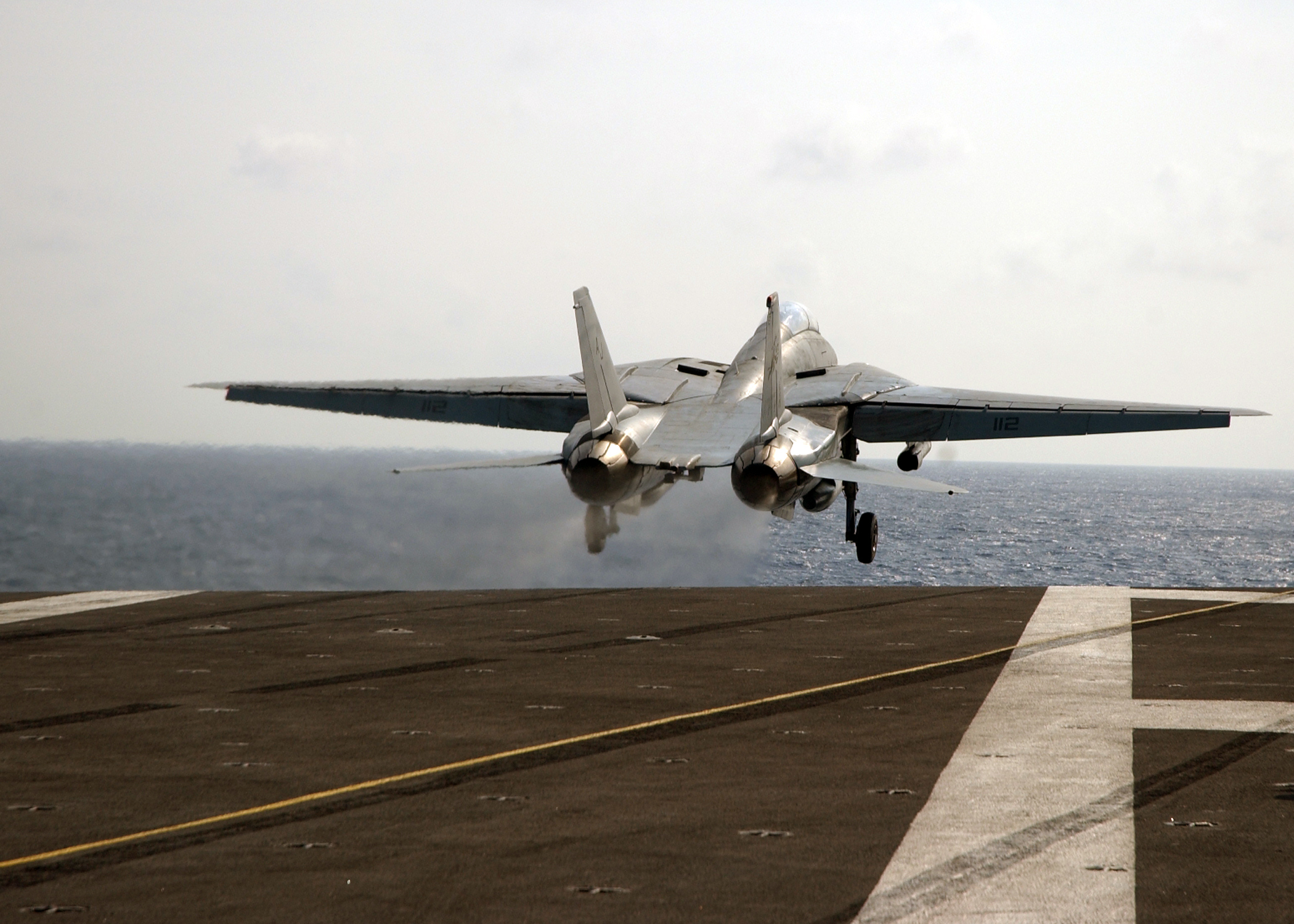
The last F-14 launch from a carrier, USS Theodore Roosevelt, on 28 July 2006

The last American F-14 combat mission was completed on 8 February 2006, when a pair of Tomcats landed aboard USS Theodore Roosevelt after one dropped a bomb over Iraq. During their final deployment with Theodore Roosevelt, VF-31 and VF-213 collectively completed 1,163 combat sorties totaling 6,876 flight hours, and dropped 9,500 lb (4,300 kg) of ordnance during reconnaissance, surveillance, and close air support missions in support of Operation Iraqi Freedom. USS Theodore Roosevelt launched an F-14D, of VF-31, for the last time on 28 July 2006; piloted by Lt. Blake Coleman and Lt. Cmdr Dave Lauderbaugh as RIO. The last two F-14 squadrons, the VF-31 Tomcatters and the VF-213 Black Lions conducted their last fly-in at Naval Air Station Oceana on 10 March 2006.

The official final flight retirement ceremony was on 22 September 2006 at Naval Air Station Oceana and was flown by Lt. Cmdr. Chris Richard and Lt. Mike Petronis as RIO in a backup F-14 after the primary aircraft experienced mechanical problems. The actual last flight of an F-14 in U.S. service took place 4 October 2006, when an F-14D of VF-31 was ferried from NAS Oceana to Republic Airport on Long Island, New York. The remaining intact F-14 aircraft in the U.S. were flown to and stored at the 309th Aerospace Maintenance and Regeneration Group "Boneyard", at Davis-Monthan Air Force Base, Arizona; in 2007 the U.S. Navy announced plans to shred the remaining F-14s to prevent any components from being acquired by Iran. In August 2009, the 309th AMARG stated that the last aircraft were taken to HVF West, Tucson, Arizona for shredding. At that time only 11 F-14s remained in desert storage.

On 28 April 2026, the U.S. Senate approved the "Maverick Act" bill, authored by U.S. Rep. Abraham Hamadeh and sponsored by Sen. Tim Sheehy. The bill proposes to authorize the secretary of the Navy (SECNAV) to transfer three F-14Ds currently in the Navy's inventory to the U.S. Space & Rocket Center in Huntsville, Alabama, for restoration to flyable status, enabling their usage in airshows. The bill has yet to be approved as a law as of May 2026.

=== Iran ===
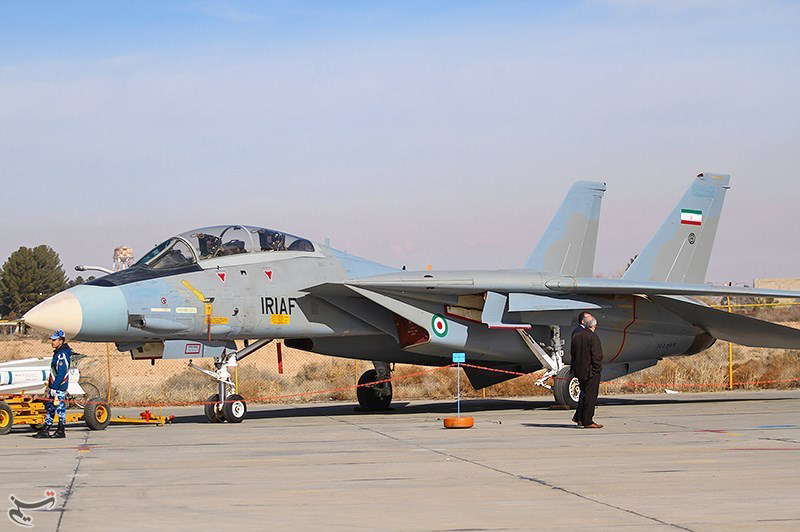
Iranian F-14 Tomcat

Although attempts had been made to sell the Tomcat to the air forces of Canada, Germany, and Japan, the Imperial Iranian Air Force (IIAF) would ultimately be the sole foreign customer for the Tomcat. During the reign of the last Shah of Iran, Mohammad Reza Pahlavi, in the early 1970s, the IIAF was searching for an advanced fighter, specifically one capable of intercepting Soviet MiG-25 reconnaissance flights. After a visit of U.S. President Richard Nixon to Pahlavi Iran in 1972, during which Iran was offered the latest in American military technology, the IIAF selected and initiated acquisition of the F-14 Tomcat, but offered McDonnell Douglas the chance to demonstrate its F-15 Eagle. The US Navy and Grumman Corporation arranged competitive demonstrations of the Eagle and the Tomcat at Andrews AFB for the Shah and high-ranking officers, and in January 1974 Iran placed an order for 30 F-14s and 424 AIM-54 Phoenix missiles, initiating Project Persian King, worth US$300 million. A few months later, this order was increased to a total of 80 Tomcats and 714 Phoenix missiles as well as spare parts and replacement engines for 10 years, complete armament package, and support infrastructure (including construction of the Khatami Air Base near Isfahan).

The first F-14 arrived in January 1976, modified only by the removal of classified avionics components, but fitted with the TF30-414 engines. The following year 12 more were delivered. Meanwhile, training of the first groups of Iranian crews by the U.S. Navy was underway in the US; one of these conducted a successful shoot-down with a Phoenix missile of a target drone flying at 50,000 ft (15 km).

Following the overthrow of the Shah in 1979, the air force was renamed the Islamic Republic of Iran Air Force (IRIAF) and the post-revolution Interim Government of Iran canceled most Western arms orders. In 1980, an Iranian F-14 shot down an Iraqi Mil Mi-25 helicopter for its first air-to-air kill during the Iran–Iraq War (1980–1988). According to research by Tom Cooper, Iranian F-14s scored at least 50 air-to-air victories in the first six months of the war against Iraqi MiG-21s, MiG-23s and some Su-20s/22s. During the same period, only one Iranian F-14 suffered damage after being hit by debris from a nearby MiG-21 that exploded.

Iranian Tomcats were originally used as an early-warning platform assisting other less-sophisticated aircraft with targeting and defense. They were also crucial to the defense of areas deemed vital by the Iranian government, such as oil terminals on Kharg Island and industrial infrastructure in the capital Tehran. Many of these patrols had the support of Boeing 707-3J9C and 747-131(SF) in-flight refueling tankers. As fighting escalated between 1982 and 1986, the F-14s gradually became more involved in the battle. They performed well, but their primary role was to intimidate the Iraqi Air Force and avoid heavy engagement to protect the fleet's numbers. Their presence was often enough to drive away opposing Iraqi fighters. The precision and effectiveness of the Tomcat's AWG-9 weapons system and AIM-54A Phoenix long-range air-to-air missiles enabled the F-14 to maintain air superiority. In December 1980, an Iraqi MiG-21bis accounted for the only confirmed kill of an F-14 by that type of aircraft. On 11 August 1984, a MiG-23ML shot down an F-14A using an R-60 missile. On 2 September 1986, a MiG-23ML using an R-24T missile mistakenly shot down an F-14 that was defecting to Iraq. On 17 January 1987, another Iranian F-14A was shot down; according to some sources it was shot down by a MiG-23ML. According to the latest data, the F-14A, which was shot down on 17 January, was destroyed by an R-40 missile fired by an Iraqi MiG-25PDS (pilot Captain Adnan Sae’ed), and the MiG-23 pilot did not claim any victory.

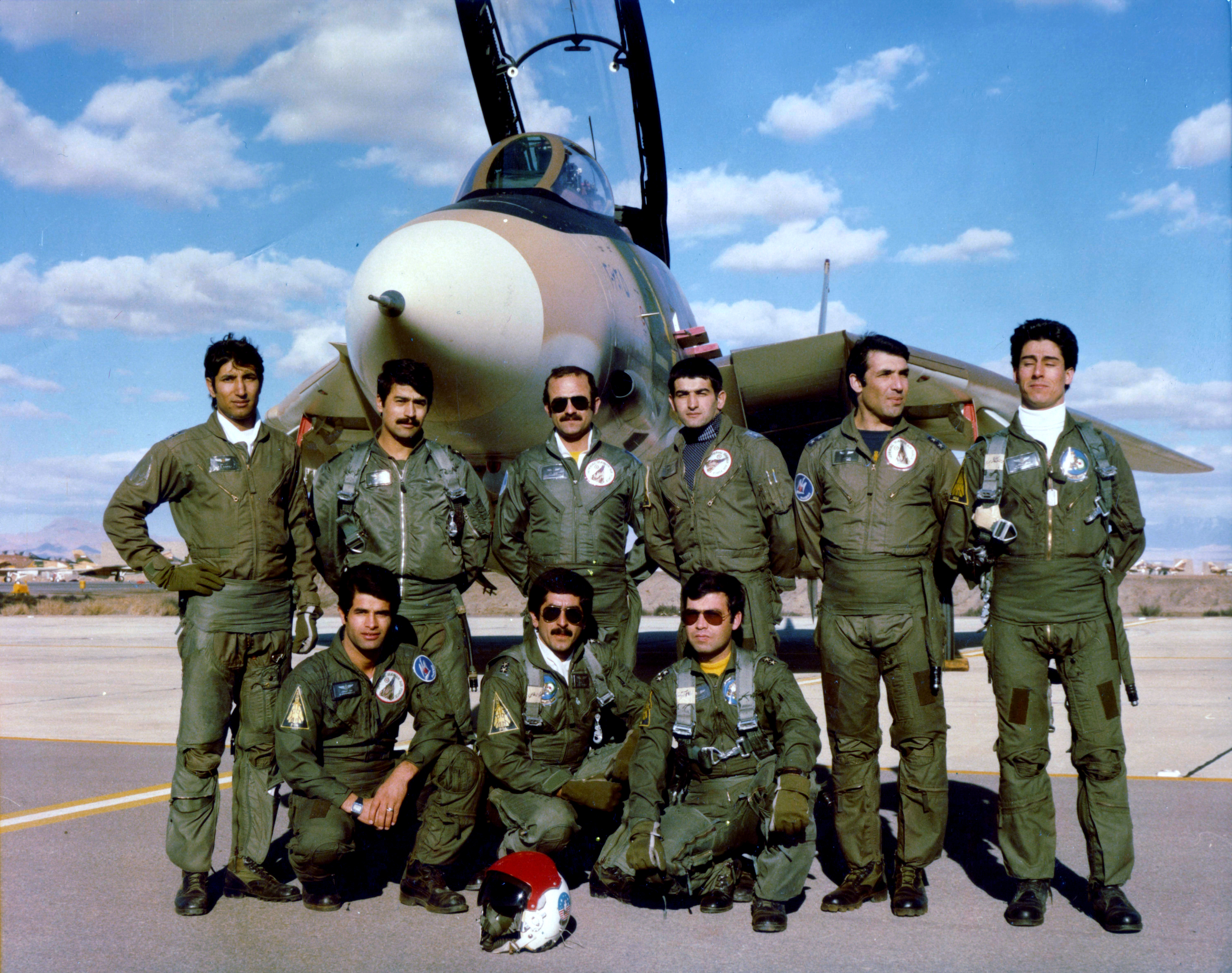
Iranian F-14 pilots standing in front of an Imperial Iranian Air Force F-14

Iraq also obtained Mirage F.1EQ fighters from France in 1981, armed with Super 530F and Magic Mk.2 air-to-air missiles. The Mirage F.1 fighters were eventually responsible for four confirmed F-14 kills. The IRIAF attempted to keep 60 F-14s operational throughout the war, but reports indicate this number was reduced to 30 by 1986 with only half fully mission-capable.

Based on research by Tom Cooper and Farzad Bishop, Iran claimed their F-14s shot down at least 160 Iraqi aircraft during the Iran–Iraq War, including 58 MiG-23s (15 of these are confirmed according to Cooper), 33 Mirage F1s, 23 MiG-21s, 23 Su-20s/22s, nine MiG-25s (one of these are confirmed according to Iraqi sources), five Tu-22s, two MiG-27s, one Mil Mi-24, one Dassault Mirage 5, one B-6D, one Aérospatiale Super Frelon, and two unidentified aircraft. Despite the circumstances the F-14s and their crews faced during the war against Iraq – lacking support from AWACS, AEW aircraft, and Ground Control Intercept (GCI) – the F-14 proved to be successful in combat. It achieved this in the midst of a confrontation with an enemy that was constantly upgrading its capabilities and receiving support from three major countries – France, the US, and the USSR. Part of the success is attributed to the resilient Iranian economy and IRIAF personnel.

While Iraq's army claimed it shot down more than 70 F-14s, the Foreign Broadcast Information System in Washington DC estimated that Iran lost 12 to 16 F-14s during the war. Cooper writes three F-14s were shot down by Iraqi pilots and four by Iranian surface-to-air missiles (SAM). Two more Tomcats were lost in unknown circumstances during the battle, and seven crashed due to technical failure or accidents. During the war, the Iranian Air Force F-14s suffered ten confirmed losses, one lost due to engine stall, one in unknown conditions, two by Iranian HAWK SAMs, two by MIG-23s and four were shot down by Mirage F-1s. There are also unconfirmed reports of the downing of 10 more Tomcats.

On 31 August 1986, an Iranian F-14A armed with at least one AIM-54A missile defected to Iraq. Then again on 2 September 1986 another Iranian F-14A defected to Iraq.

On 24 July 2002, an Iranian F-14A confronted two Azerbaijani MiG-25s that were threatening an Iranian P-3F, securing a radar lock on one of the MiGs, which then turned away, during tensions over attempts by Azerbaijan to survey for oil in Iranian waters in the Caspian Sea.

Iran had an estimated 44 F-14s in 2009 according to Combat Aircraft. Aviation Week estimated it had 19 operational F-14s in January 2013, and FlightGlobal estimated that 28 were in service in 2014.

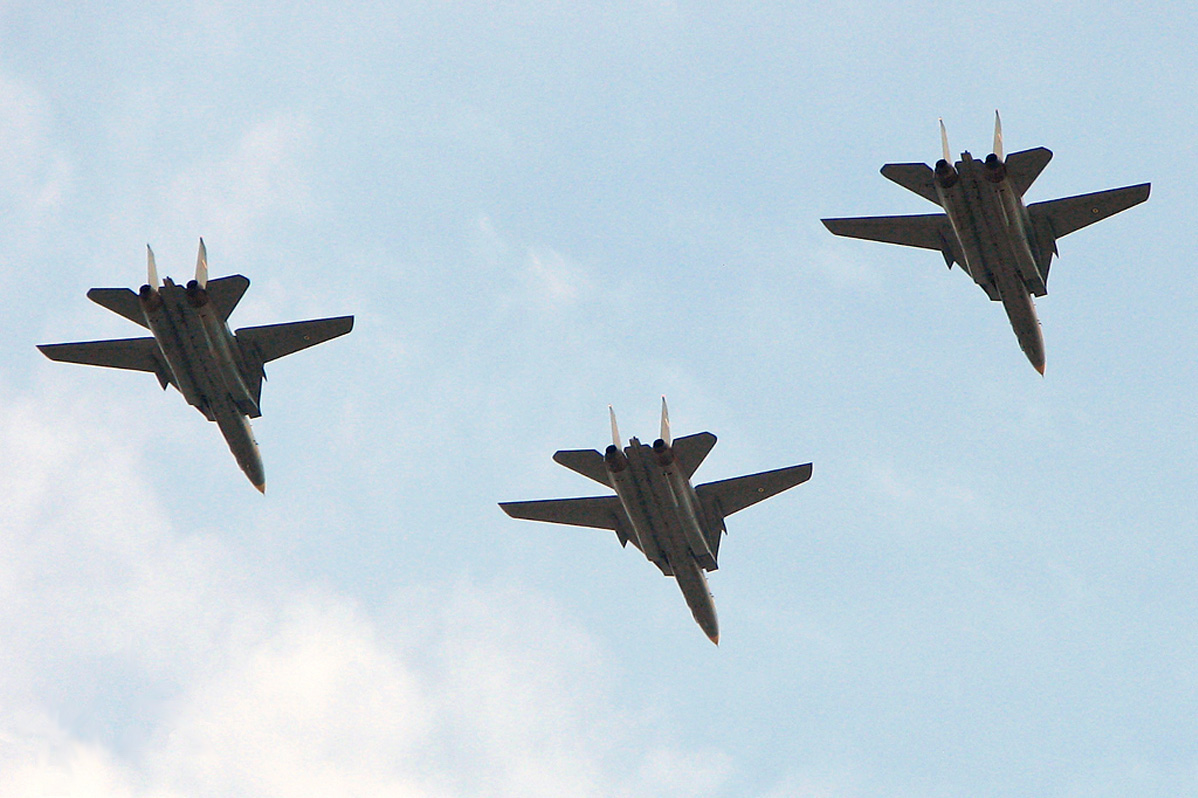
Formation flight of Iranian Tomcats, 2008

Following the US Navy's retirement of its Tomcats in 2006, Iran sought to purchase spare parts for its aircraft. In January 2007, the U.S. Department of Defense announced that sales of spare F-14 parts would be suspended over concerns of the parts ending up in Iran. In July 2007, the remaining American F-14s were shredded to ensure that any parts could not be acquired. Despite these measures, Iran managed to significantly increase its stocks of spare parts, increasing the number of airworthy Tomcats, although it did not manage to obtain spare parts for the aircraft's weapon systems, the number of combat ready Tomcats was still low (seven in 2008). In 2010, Iran requested that the U.S. deliver the 80th F-14 that it had purchased in 1974 but never received due to the Islamic Revolution. In October 2010, an Iranian Air Force commander claimed that the country overhauls and optimizes different types of military aircraft, mentioning their Air Force has installed Iran-made radar systems on the F-14. In 2012, the Iranian Air Force's Mehrabad Overhaul Center delivered an F-14 with upgraded weapon systems with locally sourced components, designated F-14AM. Shortages of Phoenix missiles led to attempts to integrate the Russian R-27 semi-active radar-guided missile, but these proved unsuccessful. An alternative was the use of modified MIM-23 Hawk missiles to replace the Tomcat's Phoenixes and Sparrows, but as the Tomcat could only carry two Hawks, this project was also abandoned, and the Fakour-90 missile, which used the guidance system of the Hawk packaged into the airframe of the Phoenix, launched. Pre-production Fakour-90s were delivered in 2017, and a production order for 100 missiles (now designated AIM-23B) was placed in 2018, intending to replace the F-14s AIM-7E Sparrow missiles.

On 26 January 2012, an Iranian F-14 scrambled to intercept an intruder flying towards the Bushehr nuclear power plant, but crashed three minutes after takeoff. Both crew members were killed. No cause for the incident has been determined.

In November 2015, Iranian F-14s were reported flying escort for Russian Tu-95, Tu-160 and Tu-22M bombers on air strikes in Syria against the Islamic State of Iraq and the Levant.

On 14 May 2019, an Iranian F-14 crashed during landing at Isfahan-Shahid Beheshti Airport. Both crew members ejected and survived.

On 16 June 2025, the Israel Defense Forces released video footage showing a pair of F-14s were destroyed in air strikes against Iran. On 21 June 2025, the IDF released video footage showing another three F-14s being destroyed by airstrikes.

According to Tom Cooper, prior to the 2026 Iran war the IRIAF had a total of 10 operational Tomcats. On 9 March 2026 satellite imagery showed at least 8 destroyed F-14s in Isfahan as a result of Israeli airstrikes; according to Cooper, some of these aircraft were actually wooden decoys. It is unknown if there are any flight-worthy F-14s as of September 2026.

=== Notable F-14 crew members ===
==== Iran ====
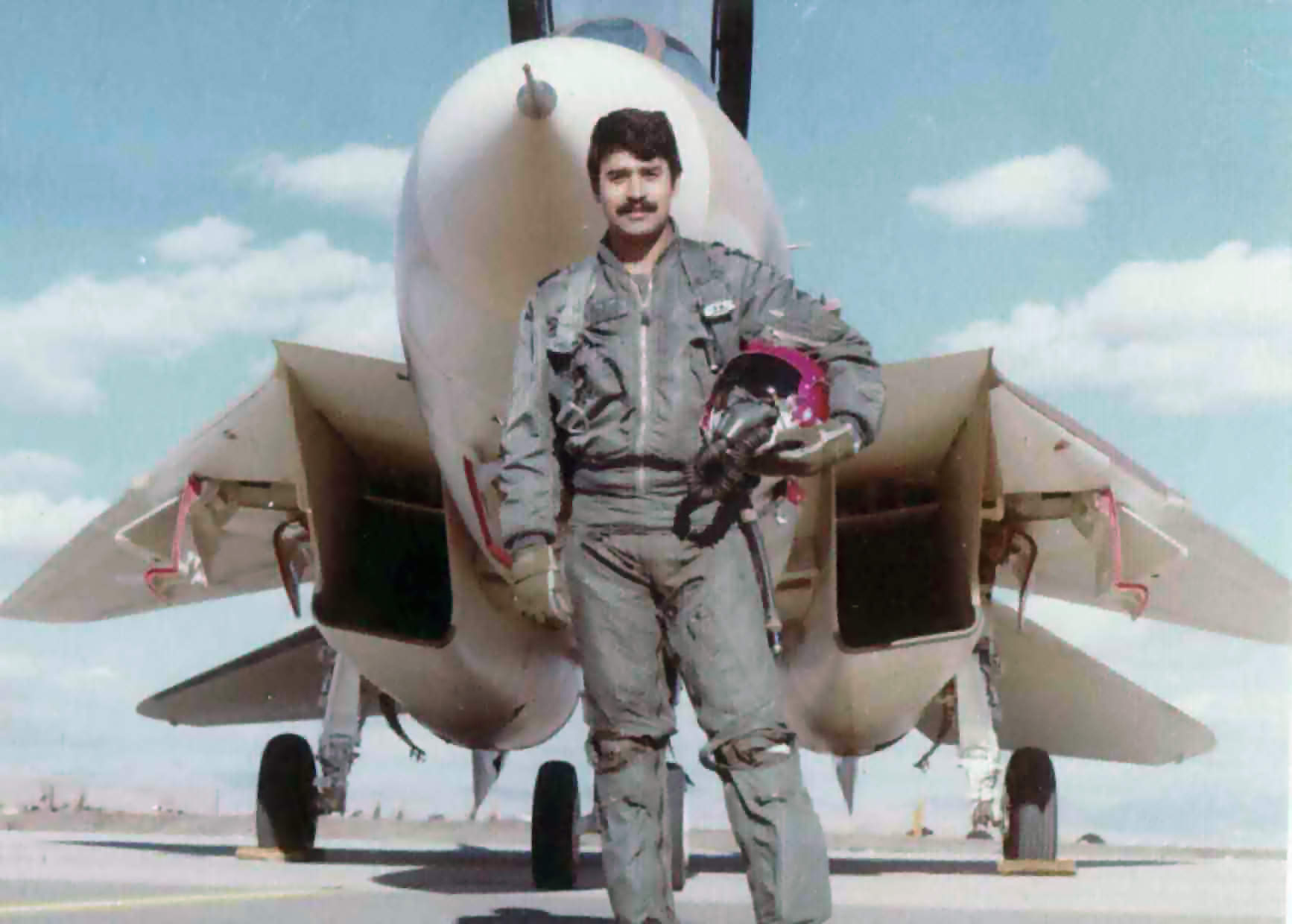
Iranian ace Jalil Zandi is credited with shooting down eleven Iraqi aircraft during the Iran–Iraq War, making him the highest-scoring F-14 pilot in history.

- Assadollah Adeli – IRIAF ace pilot credited with five aerial victories.
- Fereidoun Ali-Mazandarani – IRIAF ace pilot with an estimated nine to eleven victories.
- Fazlollah Javidnia – IRIAF ace pilot with eleven confirmed and two probable victories.
- Jalil Zandi – IRIAF ace pilot and highest-scoring F-14 pilot. Credited with eleven confirmed kills during the Iran–Iraq War.

==== United States ====
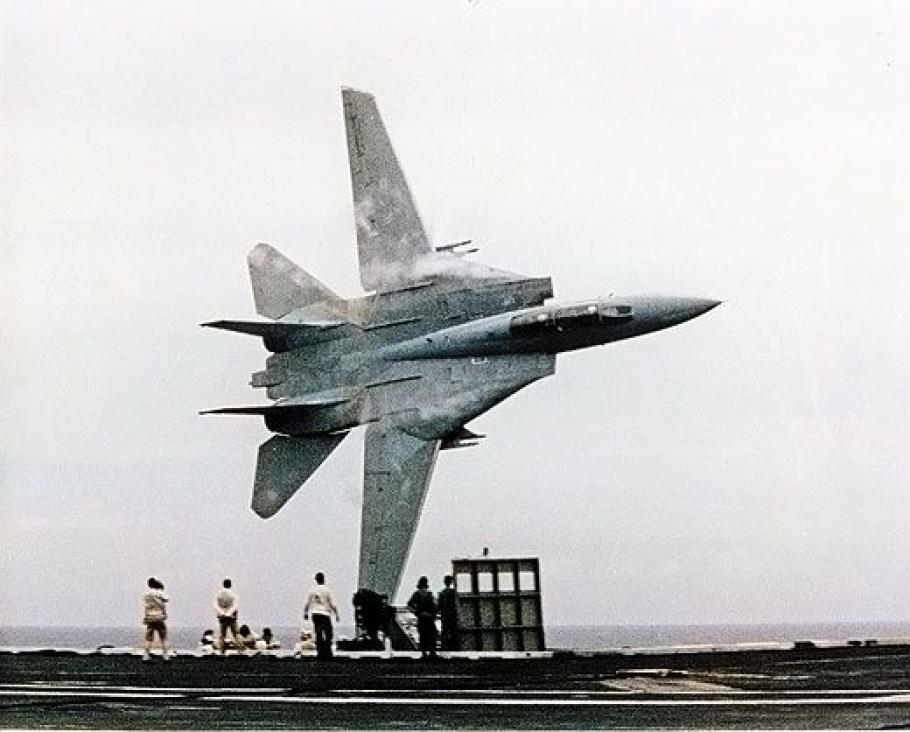
Dale "Snort" Snodgrass performing the "banana pass" stunt over the USS America in 1988

- Scott Altman – former NASA astronaut and commander of Space Shuttle missions STS-109 (2002) and STS-125 (2009). Altman deployed twice on the USS Carl Vinson as an F-14 pilot of VF-51 from 1984 to 1987 and worked as a test pilot for F-14 test programs, including the first deployment of the F-14D variant in 1992, before being selected for the NASA astronaut program. He also participated in the filming of Top Gun as a stunt pilot, most notably the tower flyby stunt.
- Walter E. Carter Jr. – retired Navy vice admiral, 62nd superintendent of the U.S. Naval Academy, and former president of the Ohio State University. Carter accumulated 6,150 flight hours and 2,016 carrier-arrested landings as a RIO on the F-4, F-14, and F/A-18. He transitioned to the F-14 in 1986 through VF-124 in NAS Miramar while simultaneously taking instructor duty and subsequently deployed with VF-21 on the USS Independence during the Gulf War. He later assumed command of VF-14 in 1998 and led the squadron in the completion of 550 combat missions during Operation Allied Force.
- Donnie Cochran – first African-American member of the Blue Angels flight demonstration squadron. Cochran made two deployments on the USS Enterprise as an F-14 pilot with VF-213. He later assumed command of VF-1 from 1991 until its disestablishment in 1993 and VF-111 from 1993 to 1994.
- Joe F. Edwards Jr. – former NASA astronaut. Edwards was awarded the Distinguished Flying Cross for landing a heavily damaged F-14 on the USS Dwight D. Eisenhower in 1991.
- Robert L. "Hoot" Gibson – former NASA Astronaut and commander of Space Shuttle missions STS-61-C (1986), STS-27 (1988), STS-47 (1992) and STS-71 (1995). Gibson was assigned to VF-1 during the introduction of the F-14 to fleet service between 1972 and 1975. He later became an F-14A instructor assigned to VF-124 in 1977.
- Kara Hultgreen – one of the first female carrier-based Naval aviators. Hultgreen deployed with VF-213 on the USS Abraham Lincoln and became the first female fighter pilot in the U.S. military to die in a crash when her F-14 crashed into the sea on approach to the Lincoln in 1994.
- James W. Huston – New York Times best-selling author. Huston flew as a RIO in many of the F-14 flight sequences in the 1980 movie The Final Countdown while touring with VF-84 on the USS Nimitz.
- Scott Kelly – former astronaut who commanded Expeditions 26, 45, and 46 of the International Space Station (ISS) and Space Shuttle mission STS-118 (2007). Kelly trained on the F-14 with VF-101 and deployed with VF-143 on the USS Dwight D. Eisenhower upon completion of his training in September 1990. He also proposed a digital flight control system designed to prevent accidents similar to that of Kara Hultgreen's.
- Carey Lohrenz – one of the first fully qualified female naval aviators to fly the F-14. Lohrenz deployed with VF-213 on the USS Abraham Lincoln in the mid-1990s before resigning from the Navy in 1999 and beginning a career as a leadership expert and professional speaker.
- Michael Manazir – retired rear admiral and former vice president of Boeing in Government Operations, Global Services, and Defense, Space and Security from 2017 to 2024. He first deployed in 1984 as a pilot and landing signal officer with VF-51 before assuming command of VF-31 from 1997 to 1998 and serving as the OPNAV Staff F-14 Requirements Officer from October 1998 to November 1999. He retired from the Navy after his tenure as Deputy Chief of Naval Operations for Warfare Systems (OPNAV N9) from June 2016 to July 2017.
- Winston E. Scott – mission specialist of Space Shuttle missions STS-72 (1996) and STS-87 (1997). Prior to his NASA career, Scott was a naval aviator who served a tour of duty with VF-84 after completing his flight training in the 1980s. He was later assigned as the Deputy Director of the Tactical Aircraft Systems Department at the Naval Air Development Center at Warminster, Pennsylvania, where he served as a research, test and evaluation (RDTE) project pilot flying the F-14, F/A-18, and A-7 aircraft.
- Dale "Snort" Snodgrass – "highest time Tomcat pilot" with more than 4,800 hours and 1,200 carrier landings with the type.
- Robert "Rat" Willard – former commander of the U.S. Pacific Fleet. As a Navy pilot, Willard frequently flew F-14s while deployed to the Western Pacific Ocean and North Arabian Sea before heading to the Navy Fighter Weapons School (TOPGUN) and serving as the operations officer and executive officer. He also worked on the movie Top Gun as an aerial coordinator and later assumed command of VF-51, the squadron that provided F-14s for the movie, in the late 1980s.
- James A. Winnefeld Jr. "Jaws" – former chair of the President's Intelligence Advisory Board. During his Navy career, Winnefeld deployed on the USS Constellation with VF-24 and the USS Ranger with VF-1 in the 1980s before becoming the commanding officer (CO) of VF-211. Later in his career, he became the CO of the USS Enterprise. During his time as a lieutenant, he worked on the movie Top Gun as a pilot.
- Reid Wiseman – NASA astronaut and flight engineer on the ISS as part of Expedition 40/41 (2014) and commander of the Artemis II lunar flyby mission (2026). Wiseman reported to VF-101 for training in 1999 and was subsequently assigned to VF-31 where he flew missions in support of Operations Southern Watch, Enduring Freedom, and Iraqi Freedom during two deployments in the early 2000s.

== Variants ==
A total of 712 F-14s were built from 1969 to 1991. F-14 assembly and test flights were performed at Grumman's plant in Calverton on Long Island, New York. Grumman facility at nearby Bethpage, New York was directly involved in F-14 manufacturing and was home to its engineers. The airframes were partially assembled in Bethpage and then shipped to Calverton for final assembly. Various tests were also performed at the Bethpage Plant.

=== F-14A ===
The F-14A was the initial two-seat, twin-engine, all-weather interceptor fighter variant for the U.S. Navy. It first flew on 21 December 1970. The first 12 F-14As were prototype versions (sometimes called YF-14As). Modifications late in its service life added precision strike munitions to its armament. The U.S. Navy received 558 F-14A aircraft and 79 were received by Iran.

Throughout its production run, the F-14A underwent numerous changes which were divided into assembly blocks labelled in multiples of 5:

- F-14A-60 (BuNo 158612 - 158619), F-14A-65 (BuNo 158620 - 158637), F-14A-70 (BuNo 158978 - 159006), F-14A-75 (BuNo 159007 - 159025)
  - early beaver tail with dielectric fairings, IRST chin pod with ALQ-100 antenna, 7-holed gun vent
- F-14A-75/80 (BuNo 159421 - 159429), F-14A-80 (BuNo 159430 - 159468)
  - dielectric fairings removed from beaver tail
- F-14A-85 (BuNo 159588 - 159637)
  - AN/ARC-159 UHF radio replaced AN/ARC-51A radio, 2-holed gun vent first installed during construction of airframe BuNos. 159612 - 159615
- F-14A-90/95 (BuNo 159825 - 159874, 160299 - 160414)
  - small angle of attack probe added to nose radome, automated maneuvering flaps. BuNos. 160299 to 160377 were delivered to the Imperial Iranian Air Force (IIAF).
- F-14A-100 (BuNo 160652 - 160696), F-14A-105 (BuNo 160887 - 160937)
  - slip clutch and coupler installation added to the flap/slat system, fuel system improvements, improved AN/AWG-9, anti-corrosion measures (i.e. seals, baffles, drain plugs)
- F-14A-110 (BuNo 161138 - 161168), F-14A-115 (BuNo 161270 - 161299)
  - AN/ALQ antenna added to the beaver tail and above and below wing gloves
- F-14A-120 (BuNo 161416 - 161445), F-14A-125 (BuNo 161597 - 161626), F-14A-130 (BuNo 161850 - 161873), F-14A-135 (BuNo 162588 - 162611)
  - ECM blisters under glove vanes and on the tip of the beavertail
- F-14A-140 (BuNo 162688 - 162711)
  - TCS chin pod with ALQ-100 antenna

=== F-14B ===
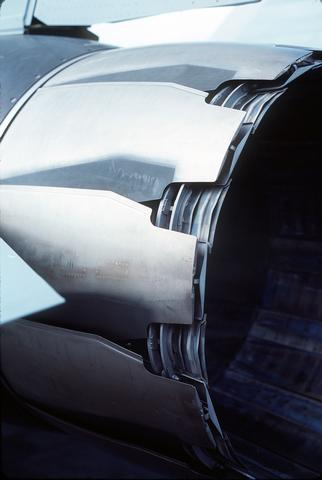
Close-up view of the distinctive afterburner petals of the GE F110 engine

The F-14 received its first of many major upgrades in March 1987 with the F-14A Plus (or F-14A+). The F-14A's TF30 engine was replaced with the improved F110-GE-400 engine. The F-14A+ also received the state-of-the-art ALR-67 Radar Homing and Warning (RHAW) system. Many of the avionics components, as well as the AWG-9 radar, were retained. The F-14A+ was later redesignated F-14B on 1 May 1991. A total of 38 new aircraft were manufactured and 43 F-14A were upgraded into B variants. In the late 1990s, 81 F-14Bs were upgraded to extend airframe life and improve offensive and defensive avionics systems. The modified aircraft became known as F-14B (Upgrade).

=== F-14D ===
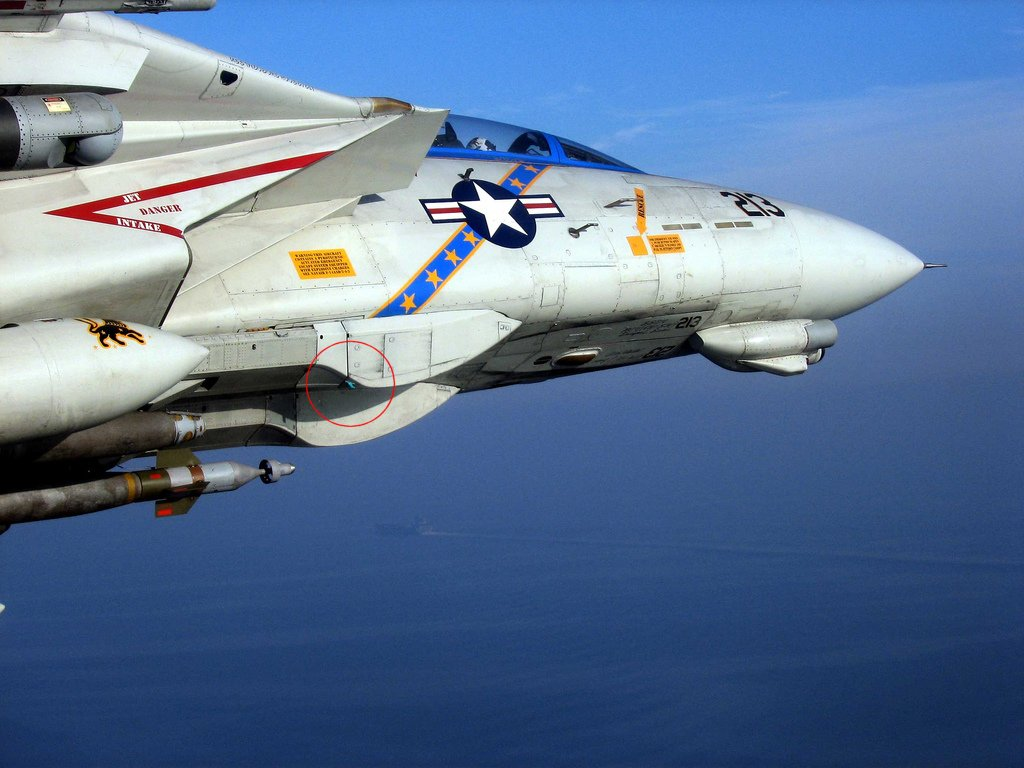
An upgraded F-14D(R) Tomcat with the ROVER transmit antenna circled with USS Theodore Roosevelt in the background

The final variant of the F-14 was the F-14D Super Tomcat, first delivered in 1991. As with the F-14B, the F-14D was equipped with the F110-GE-400 engines. It also included newer digital avionics systems including a glass cockpit and replaced the AWG-9 with the newer AN/APG-71 radar. Other systems included the Airborne Self Protection Jammer (ASPJ), Joint Tactical Information Distribution System (JTIDS), SJU-17(V) Naval Aircrew Common Ejection Seats (NACES), and Infrared search and track (IRST). A total of 37 new aircraft were completed, and 18 F-14A models were upgraded to D-models, designated F-14D(R) for a rebuild. Starting in 2005, some F-14Ds received the ROVER III upgrade.

=== Projected variants ===
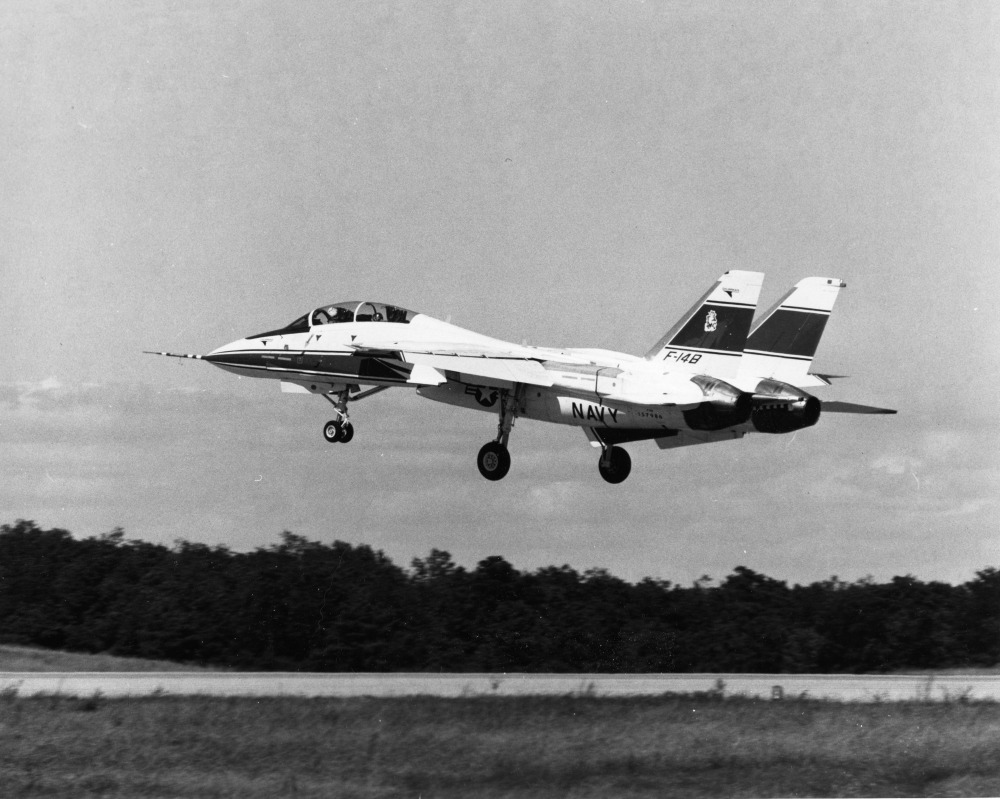
A prototype F-14B test aircraft with F401 engines installed

When the F-14 was still in development, Grumman had planned an upgrade path for the Tomcat's propulsion and avionics. The first F-14B was to be an improved version of the F-14A with more powerful Pratt & Whitney F401-400 turbofans; the F-14B prototype equipped with the F401 first flew in 1973. The F-14C was a projected variant of this initial F-14B with advanced multi-mission avionics. Grumman also offered an interceptor version of the F-14B in response to the U.S. Air Force's Improved Manned Interceptor Program as one of the contenders to replace the Convair F-106 Delta Dart as an Aerospace Defense Command interceptor in the 1970s. The F-14 ADC interceptor variant was to be armed with a GAU-7/A 25mm caseless cannon and powered by F100 turbofans. The F-14B program was terminated in April 1974. The actual F-14B and D upgrades that went into service did somewhat follow the initially projected B and C upgrade path in practice, although it was much more delayed and with fewer airframes.

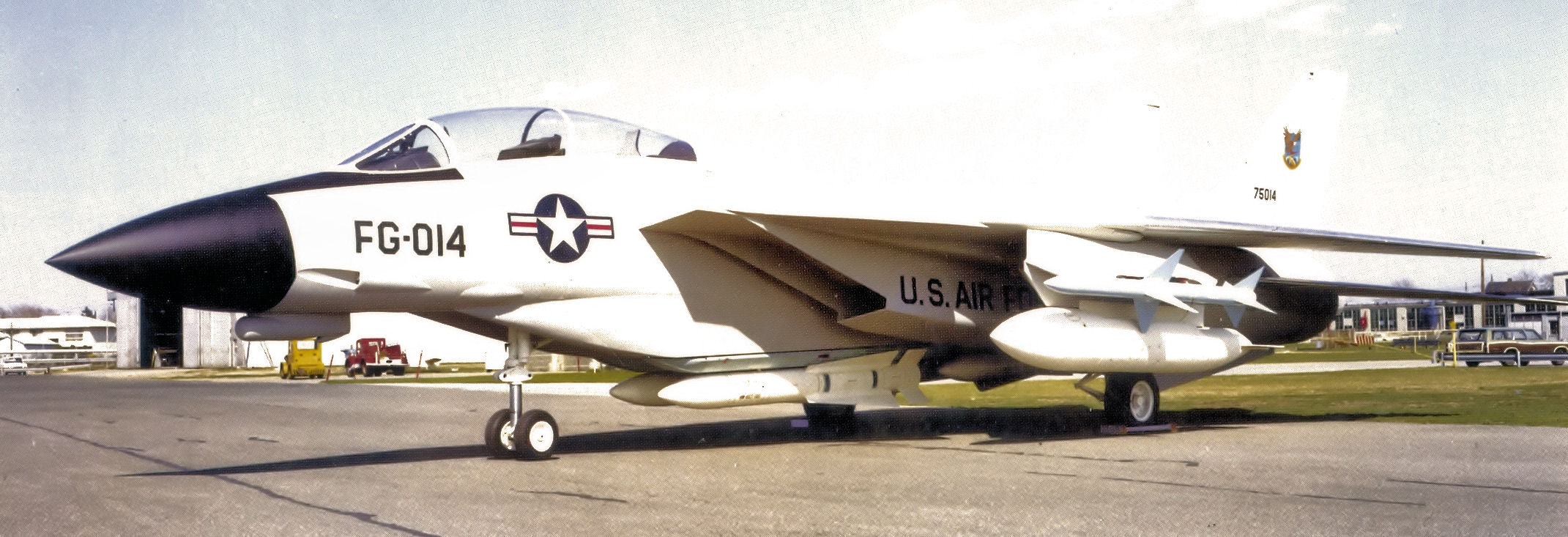
Grumman's proposed F-14 ADC Interceptor for USAF Aerospace Defense Command in 1972 with the simulated "Buzz Code" and Aerospace Defense Command livery and emblem on the tail

In the early 1990s, Grumman proposed a few improved Super Tomcat versions. The first was the Quickstrike (QS), which would have been an F-14D with navigational and targeting pods, additional attach points for weapons, and added ground attack capabilities to its radar, turning the Tomcat into a multirole strike fighter. The Quickstrike was to fill the role of the A-6 Intruder after it was retired. This was not considered enough of an improvement by Congress, so the company shifted to the Super Tomcat 21 (STC-21) proposed design. It was a proposed lower-cost alternative to the Navy Advanced Tactical Fighter (NATF), and later as a potential interim aircraft for the Advanced Attack (A-X) after the cancellation of the A-12 attack aircraft; the STC-21 would mostly have the same shape and body as the Tomcat, and an upgraded AN/APG-71 radar. The improved General Electric F110-GE-429 engines (Note: The F110-GE-429 is the designation of the proposed Navy version of the F110-GE-129.) were to provide a supercruise speed of Mach 1.3 and featured thrust vectoring nozzles. The version would have reshaped leading-edge gloves, increased fuel capacity and modified control surfaces for improved takeoffs and lower landing approach speed. The Attack Super Tomcat 21 (ATC-21) version was the last proposed Super Tomcat design and was meant to be a more attack-oriented version of the STC-21 with possibly an active electronically scanned array (AESA) radar from the canceled A-12. The STC/ATC-21 (Note: The STC-21 and ATC-21 are also sometimes informally referred to as ST-21 and AST-21 respectively.) was to be able to be rebuilt from existing F-14 airframes.

The last "Tomcat" variant was the ASF-14 (Advanced Strike Fighter-14), Grumman's replacement for the NATF concept. By all accounts, it would not be even remotely related to the previous Tomcats save in appearance, incorporating the new technology and design know-how from the Advanced Tactical Fighter (ATF) and Advanced Tactical Aircraft (ATA) programs. The ASF-14 would have been a new-build aircraft with considerably greater development costs; however, its projected capabilities were not that much better than that of the STC/ATC-21 variants. Even Grumman was not enthusiastic about it. In the end, the proposed Super Tomcat variants were considered too costly and also faced stiff political opposition from the Secretary of Defense Dick Cheney. The Navy decided to pursue the cheaper F/A-18E/F Super Hornet to fill the fighter-attack or strike fighter role.

== Operators ==
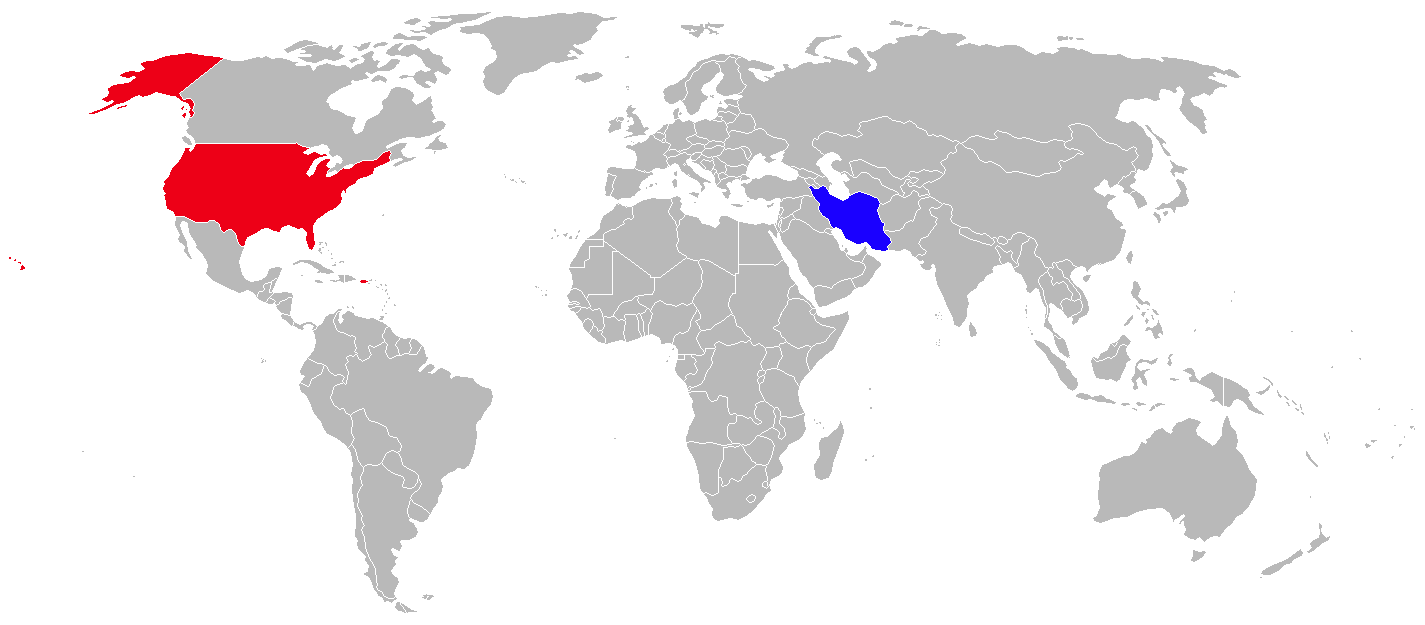
Operators As of 2010 Former

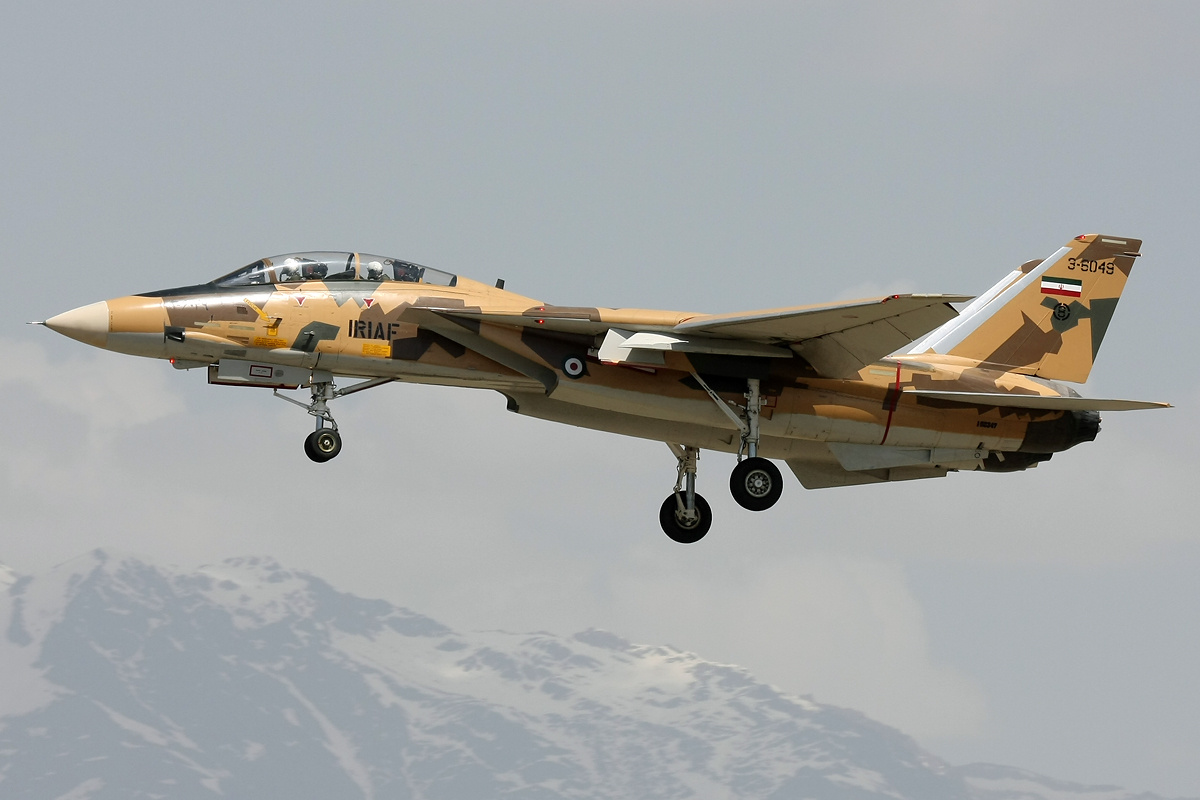
An IRIAF F-14 Tomcat landing at Mehrabad, Iran

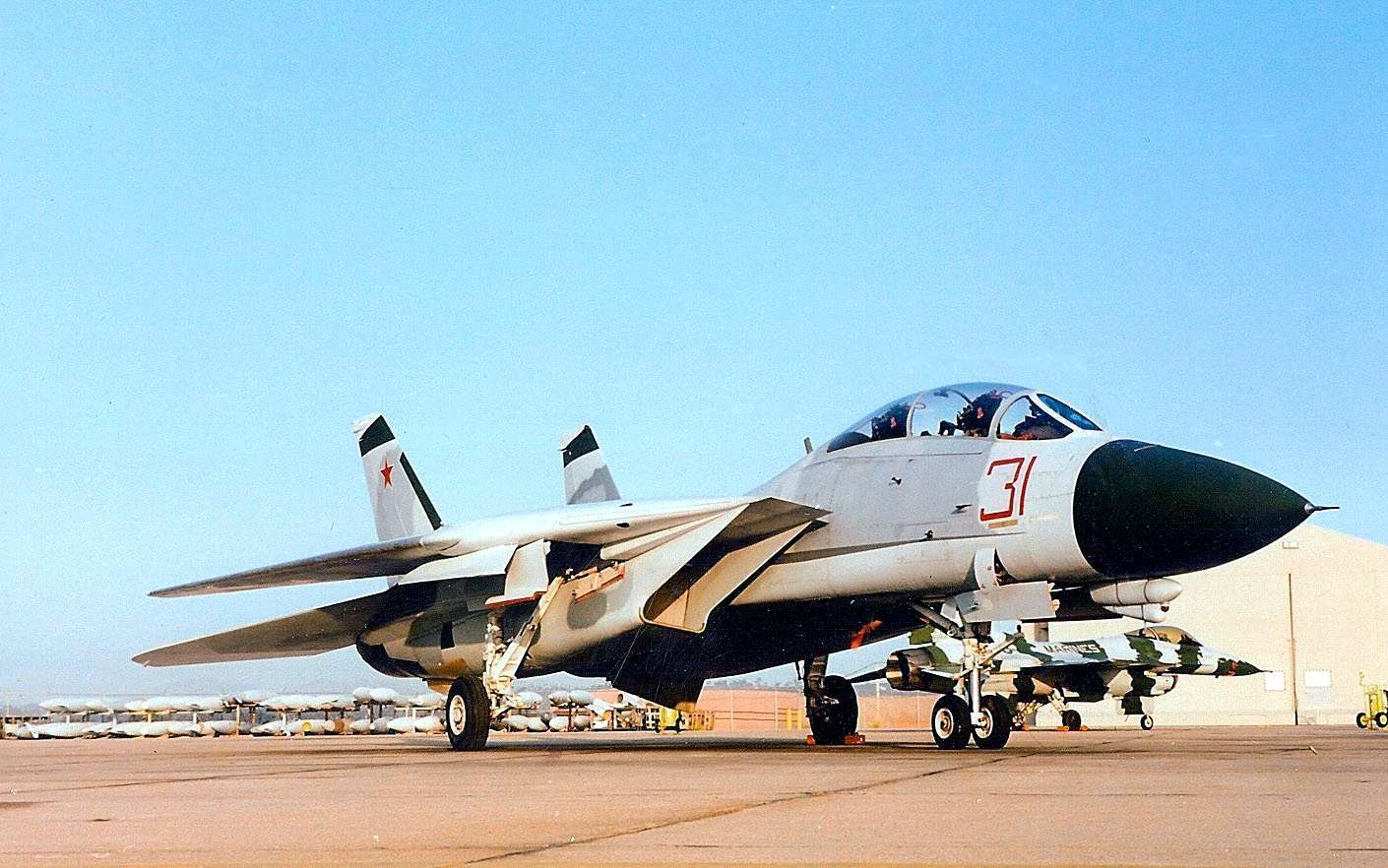
F-14A Tomcat of NFWS (TOPGUN) NAS Miramar c. 1993

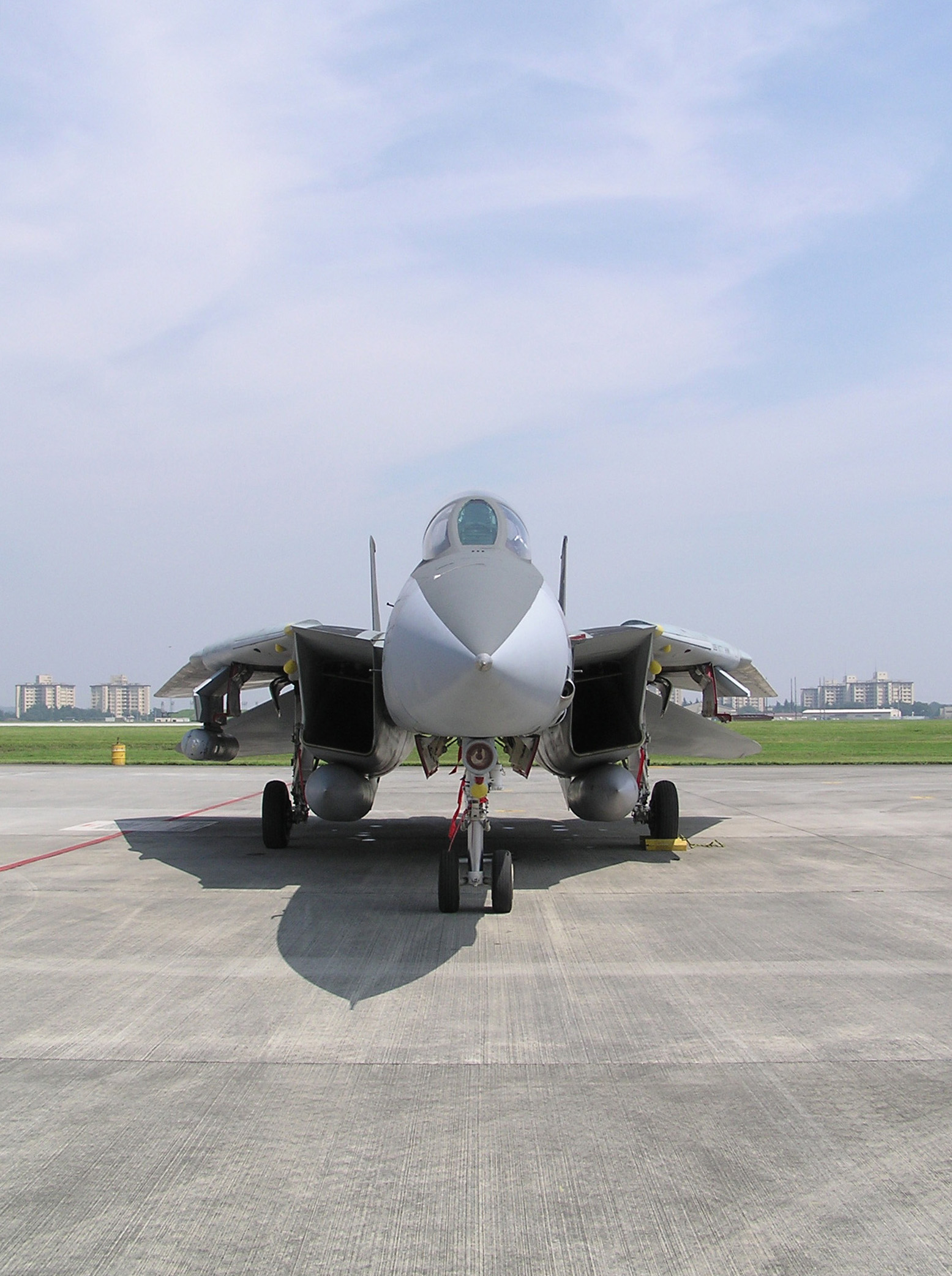
Front view of an F-14A at Yokota Air Base, Tokyo, Japan, 2003

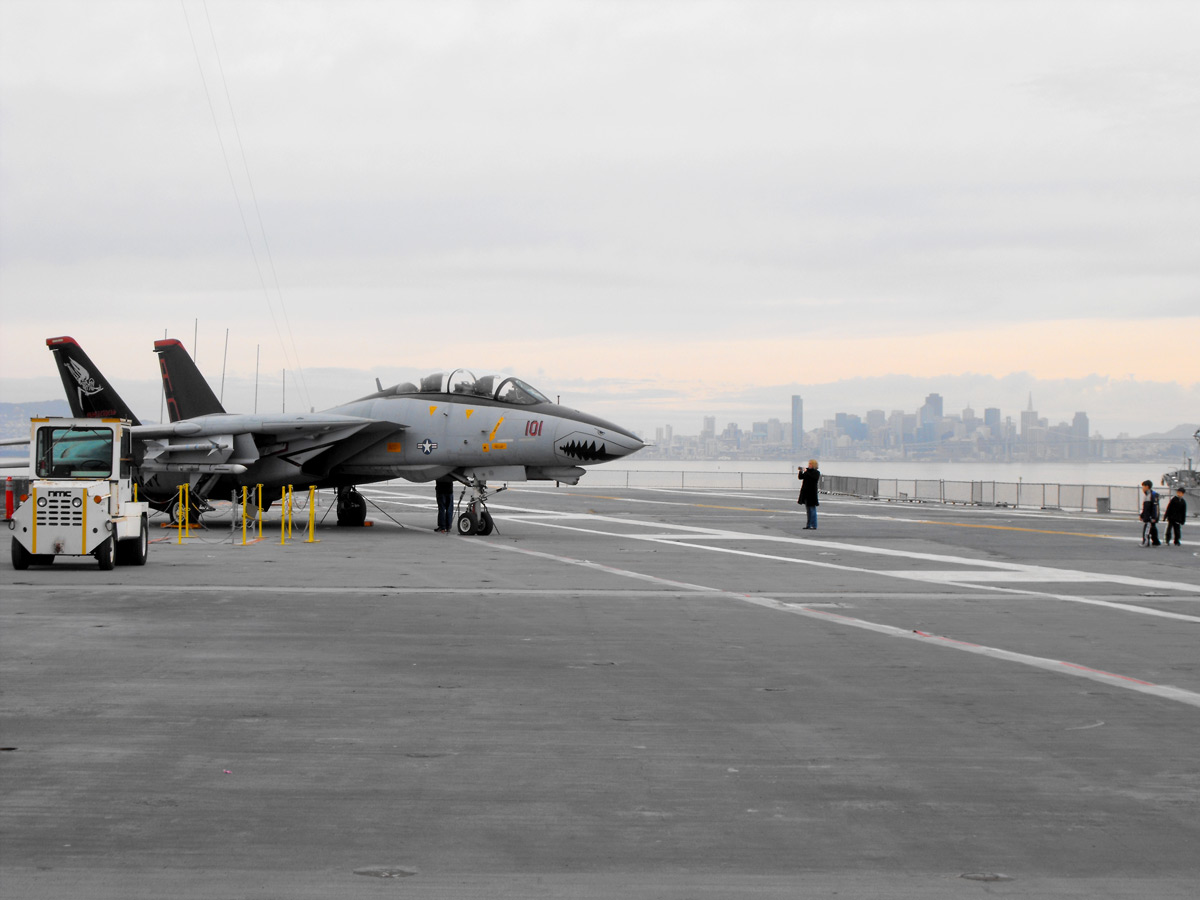
F-14A BuNo 162689 at the USS Hornet Museum in Alameda, California, 2009

Iran

- Islamic Republic of Iran Air Force − 10 operational prior to the 2026 Iran War, status unknown as of 24 March 2026
  - 72nd TFS: F-14A, 1979–1985
  - 73rd TFS: F-14A, 1979–1985
  - 81st TFS: F-14A, 1979–present
  - 82nd TFS: F-14A, 1979–present
  - 83rd TFS: F-14A, renamed former 62nd TFS

=== Former operators ===
Pahlavi Iran

- Imperial Iranian Air Force
  - 72nd TFS: F-14A, 1976–1979
  - 73rd TFS: F-14A, 1977–1979
  - 81st TFS: F-14A, 1977–1979
  - 82nd TFS: F-14A, 1978–1979
  - 83rd Tomcat Flight School: F-14A, 1978–1979

United States

- United States Navy − operated F-14 from 1974 to 2006
  - Navy Fighter Weapons School (TOPGUN) (Merged with Strike University (Strike U) to form Naval Strike and Air Warfare Center (NSAWC) 1996)
    - VF-126 Bandits (Disestablished 1 April 1994)
  - VF-1 Wolfpack (Disestablished 30 September 1993)
  - VF-2 Bounty Hunters (Pacific Fleet through 1996, Atlantic Fleet 1996–2003, Pacific Fleet 2003–present; redesignated VFA-2 with F/A-18F, 1 July 2003)
  - VF-11 Red Rippers (Redesignated to VFA-11 with F/A-18F, May 2005)
  - VF-14 Tophatters (Redesignated VFA-14 with F/A-18E, 1 December 2001, and transferred to Pacific Fleet, 2002)
  - VF-21 Freelancers (Disestablished 31 January 1996)
  - VF-24 Fighting Renegades (Disestablished 20 August 1996)
  - VF-31 Tomcatters (Redesignated VFA-31 with F/A-18E, October 2006)
  - VF-32 Swordsmen (Redesignated VFA-32 with F/A-18F, 1 October 2005)
  - VF-33 Starfighters (Disestablished 1 October 1993)
  - VF-41 Black Aces (Redesignated VFA-41 with F/A-18F, 1 December 2001)
  - VF-51 Screaming Eagles (Disestablished 31 March 1995)
  - VF-74 Bedevilers (Disestablished 30 April 1994)
  - VF-84 Jolly Rogers (Disestablished 1 October 1995; squadron heritage and nickname transferred to VF-103)
  - VF-102 Diamondbacks (Redesignated VFA-102 with F/A-18F, 1 May 2002, and transferred to Pacific Fleet)
  - VF-103 Sluggers/Jolly Rogers (Redesignated VFA-103 with F/A-18F, 1 May 2005)
  - VF-111 Sundowners (Disestablished 31 March 1995; squadron heritage and nickname adopted by VFC-111)
  - VF-114 Aardvarks (Disestablished 30 April 1993)
  - VF-142 Ghostriders (Disestablished 30 April 1995)
  - VF-143 Pukin' Dogs (Redesignated VFA-143 with F/A-18E, early 2005)
  - VF-154 Black Knights (Redesignated VFA-154 with F/A-18F, 1 October 2003)
  - VF-191 Satan's Kittens (Disestablished 30 April 1988)
  - VF-194 Red Lightnings (Disestablished 30 April 1988)
  - VF-211 Fighting Checkmates (Pacific Fleet through 1996, then transferred to Atlantic Fleet; redesignated VFA-211 with F/A-18F, 1 October 2004)
  - VF-213 Black Lions (Pacific Fleet through 1996, then transferred to Atlantic Fleet; redesignated VFA-213 with F/A-18F, May 2006)
- Naval Air Systems Command Test and Evaluation Squadrons
  - VX-4 Evaluators (Disestablished 30 September 1994 and merged into VX-5 to form VX-9)
  - VX-9 Vampires (Currently operates F/A-18C/D/E/F, EA-18G, F-35C, EA-6B, AV-8B, AH-1 and UH-1)
  - VX-23 Salty Dogs (Currently operates F/A-18A+/B/C/D/E/F, EA-6B, EA-18G, F-35C and T-45)
  - VX-30 Bloodhounds (Currently operates P-3, C-130, S-3)
- Fleet Replacement Squadrons
  - VF-101 Grim Reapers; Atlantic Fleet, then sole single-site, F-14 FRS (Disestablished 15 September 2005; squadron heritage and nickname adopted by VFA-101, an F-35C Fleet Replacement Squadron established in May 2012. VFA-101 itself would be disestablished 23 May 2019)
  - VF-124 Gunfighters; Pacific Fleet F-14 FRS (Disestablished 30 September 1994)
- Naval Air Force Reserve Squadrons
  - VF-201 Hunters (Redesignated VFA-201 and reequipped with F/A-18A+ on 1 January 1999; disestablished 30 June 2007)
  - VF-202 Superheats (Disestablished 31 December 1994)
  - VF-301 Devil's Disciples (Disestablished 11 September 1994)
  - VF-302 Stallions (Disestablished 11 September 1994)
- Naval Air Force Reserve Squadron Augmentation Units (SAUs)
  - VF-1285 Fighting Fubijars (Disestablished September 1994); augmented VF-301 and VF-302
  - VF-1485 Americans (Disestablished September 1994); augmented VF-124
  - VF-1486 Fighting Hobos (Disestablished September 2005); augmented VF-101
- Flight and weapons test units
  - Naval Air Test Center, NAS Patuxent River
  - Naval Missile Center, NAS Point Mugu
  - Pacific Missile Test Center, NAS Point Mugu
  - Naval Air Warfare Center-Weapons Division, NAS Point Mugu
  - Naval Weapons Test Squadron-Point Mugu, NAS Point Mugu
  - Naval Air Development Center, NADC Warminster
- NASA operated two F-14As. First F-14A #157991 was used High-Angle-of-Attack and Spin-Control-and-Recovery test program, between 1979 and 1985. Second F-14A #159834 at Dryden Flight Research Center in 1986 and 1987 in a program known as the Variable-Sweep Transition Flight Experiment (VSTFE). This program explored laminar flow on variable sweep aircraft at high subsonic speeds.

== Aircraft on display ==
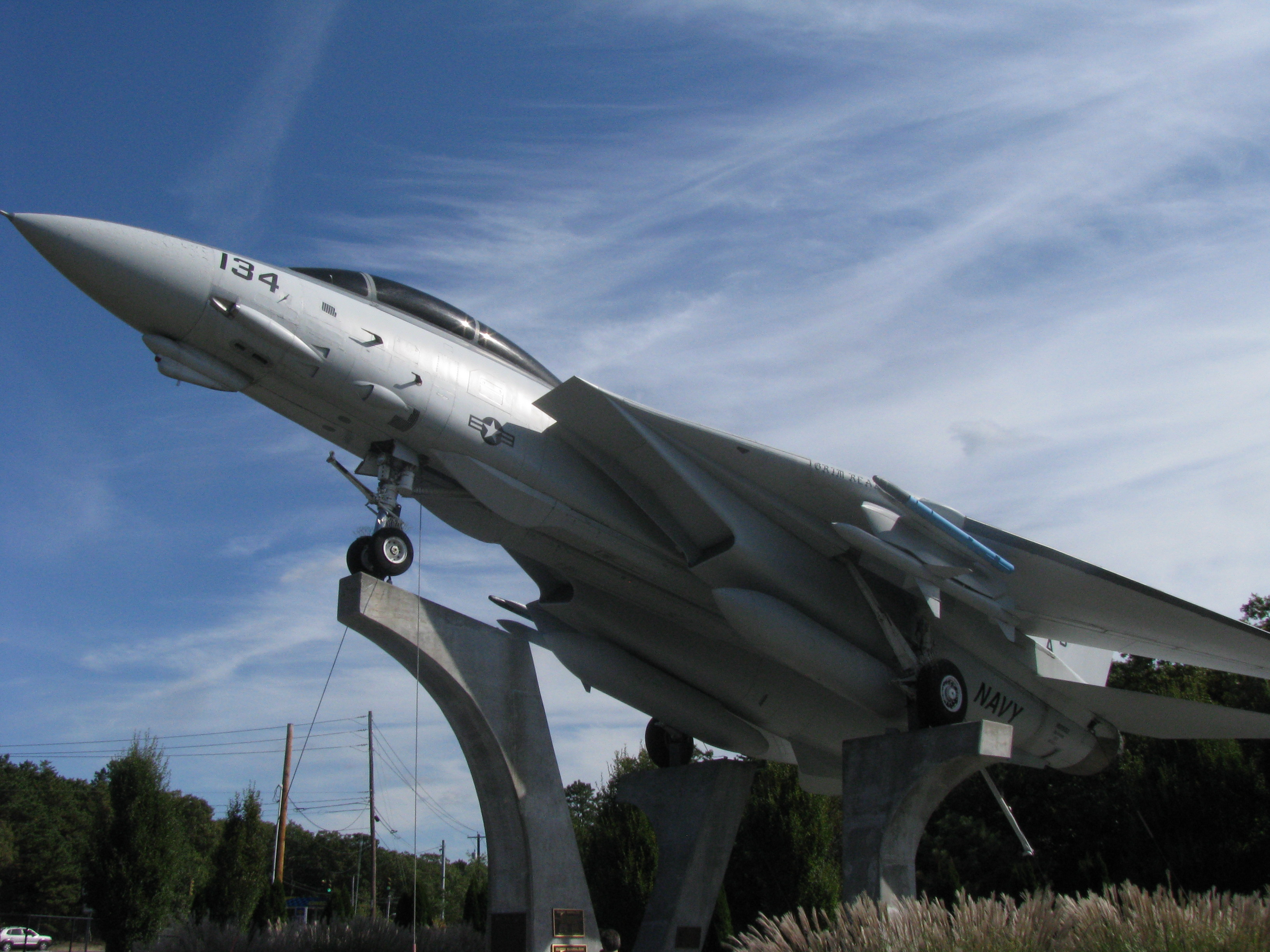
An F-14A on display at Grumman Memorial Park in New York

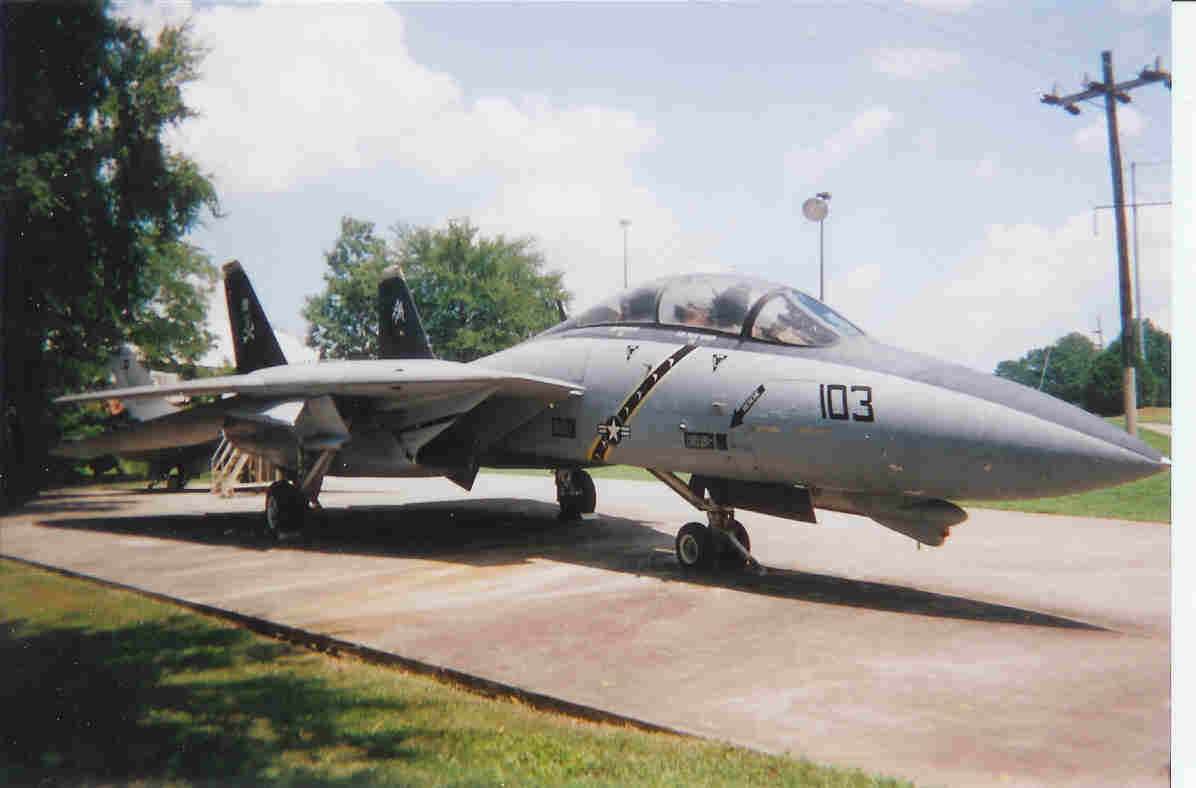
F-14A BuNo 160661 on display at the U.S. Space and Rocket Center's Aviation Challenge facility in Huntsville, Alabama, 2009

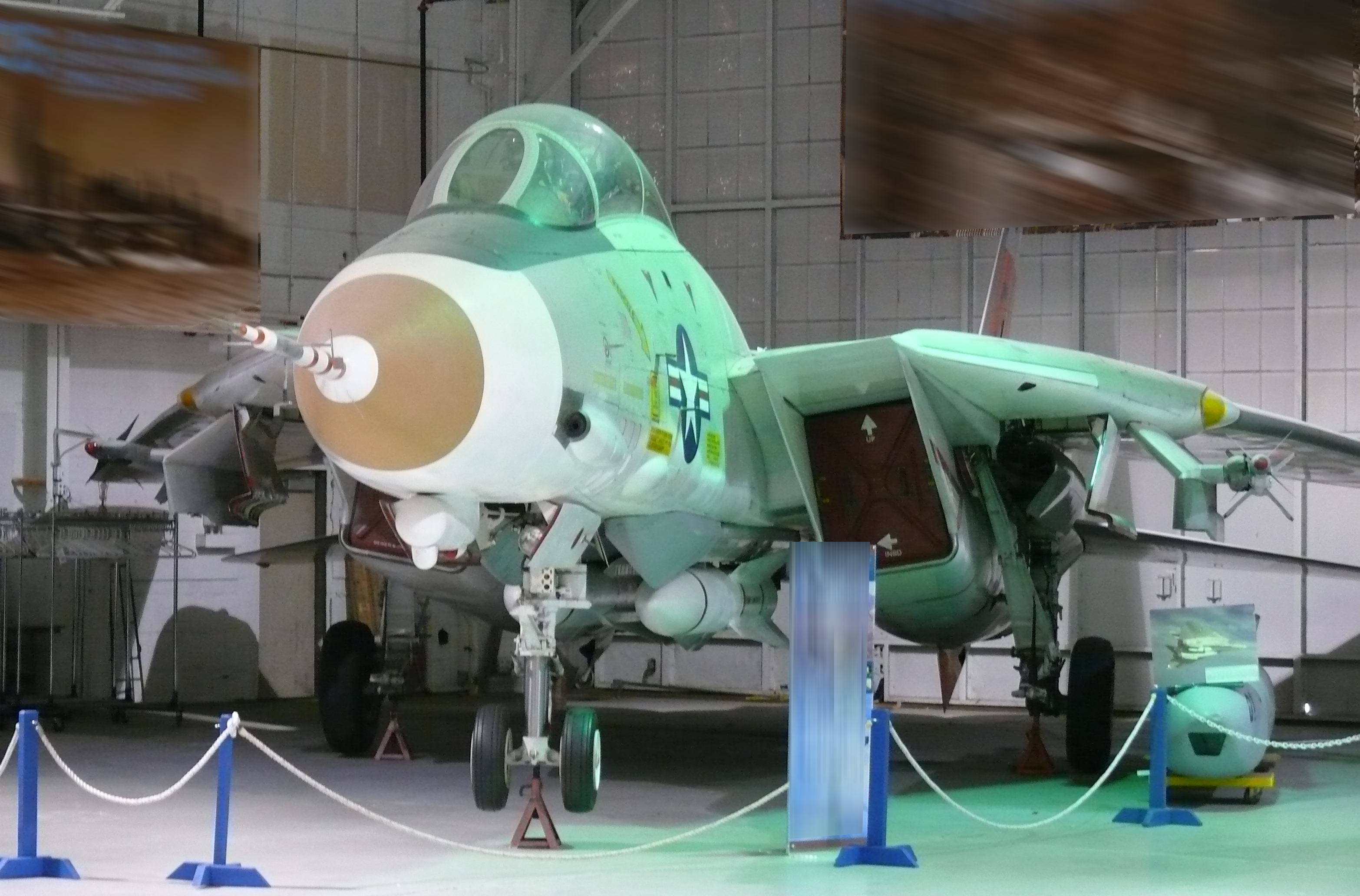
YF-14A at the Cradle of Aviation Museum

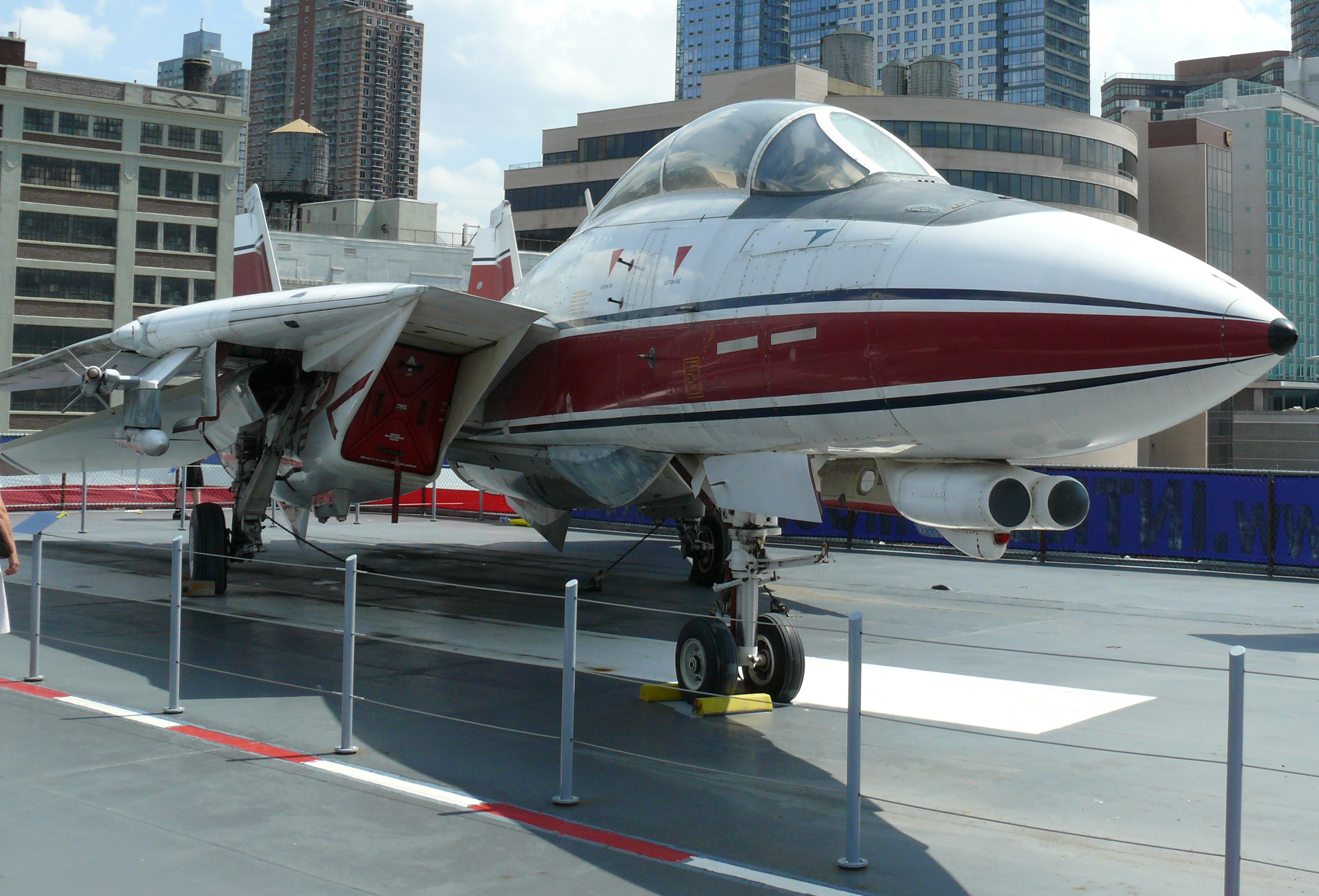
F-14D at the Intrepid Sea-Air-Space Museum

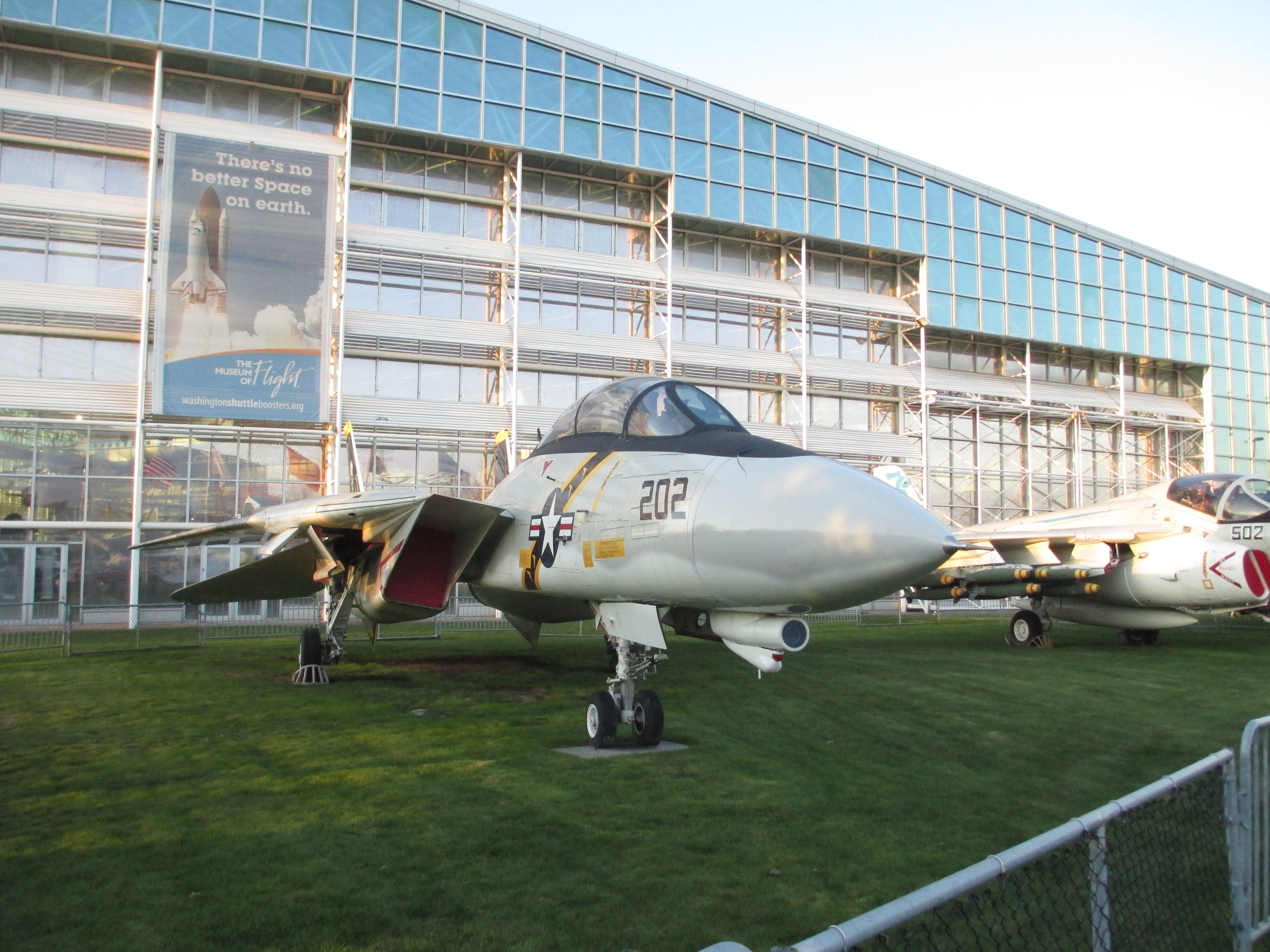
F-14A of VF-84 "Jolly Rogers" at the Museum of Flight

Notable F-14s preserved at museums and military installations include:

Bureau Number (BuNo) – Model – Location – Significance
F-14A

- 157982 – Cradle of Aviation Museum, Garden City, New York; Prototype No. 3 Nonstructural demonstration testbed
- 157984 – National Naval Aviation Museum, Naval Air Station Pensacola, Florida. Fifth F-14 manufactured and one of the prototypes used in flight testing. Mounted on pedestal at entrance to museum.
- 157988 – NAS Oceana Air Park, Virginia
- 157990 – March Field Air Museum, Riverside, California. Eleventh F-14 manufactured and one of the prototypes used in carrier suitability testing.
- 158617 – Veterans of Foreign Wars (VFW) Post 7293, Whitehall, Pennsylvania
- 158623 – Naval Base Ventura County, NAS Point Mugu, California; pedestal mount at Front Gate Airpark.
- 158627 – Hickory Aviation Museum, Hickory, NC.
- 158978 – USS Midway Museum, San Diego, California
- 158985 – Yanks Air Museum, Chino, California
- 158998 – Air Victory Museum, Lumberton, New Jersey
- 158999 – Naval Air Station Joint Reserve Base Fort Worth (former Carswell AFB), Fort Worth, Texas
- 159025 – Patriot's Point Naval and Maritime Museum, Charleston, South Carolina
- 159445 – Naval Station Norfolk (former Naval Air Station Norfolk) East Gate Airpark, Virginia
- 159448 – NAVSUP WEAPONS SYSTEMS SUPPORT, Philadelphia Pennsylvania
- 159455 – NAS Patuxent River, Lexington Park, Maryland; a former VX-23 flight test squadron aircraft
- 159620 – NAF El Centro, California
- 159626 – Naval Strike and Air Warfare Center, Naval Air Station Fallon, Nevada
- 159631 – San Diego Air & Space Museum, San Diego, California. Used in Top Gun: Maverick.
- 159829 – Wings Over the Rockies Air and Space Museum, former Lowry AFB, Denver, Colorado. From VF-211, later used for aircraft maintenance training by Naval Air Reserve Center Denver at Buckley AFB.
- 159830 – Western Museum of Flight, Torrance, California
- 159848 – Tillamook Air Museum, Tillamook, Oregon
- 159853 – Defense Supply Center Richmond, Richmond, Virginia
- 160382 – Museum of Flight, Tukwila, Washington. VF-84 "Jolly Rogers" AJ202. Stationed on the aircraft carrier USS Nimitz. This aircraft, as well as several other F-14As from the famous "Jolly Rogers" squadron, appear in the 1980 film The Final Countdown, which was filmed on board USS Nimitz. On loan from the National Museum of Naval Aviation at Pensacola, Florida.
- 160386 – Recruit Training Command, Naval Station Great Lakes, Chicago, Illinois

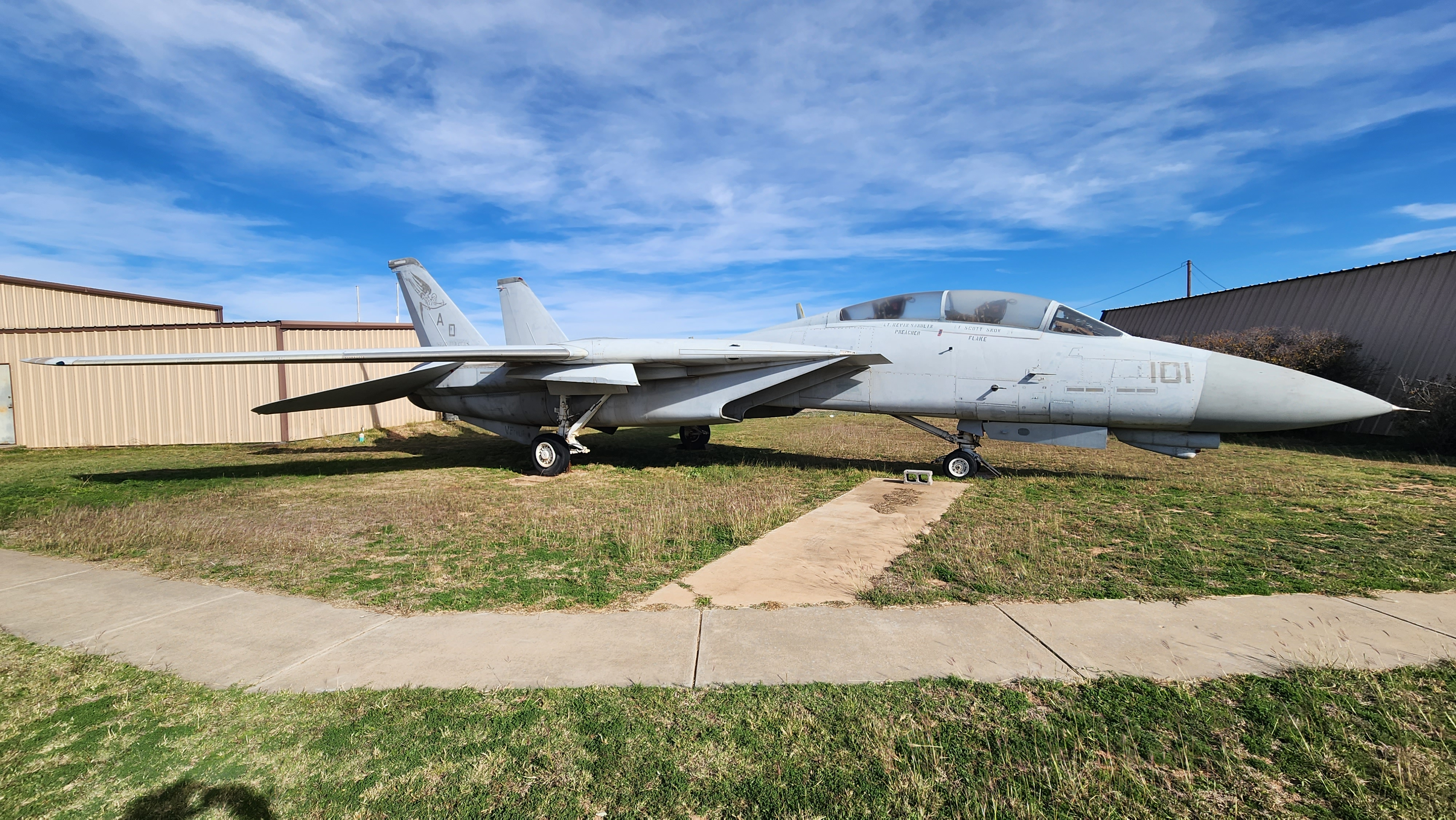
F-14 Tomcat at the Texas Air Museum in Slaton, Texas

- 160391 – Texas Air Museum, Slaton, Texas, on loan from the National Naval Aviation Museum, appeared in the films The Final Countdown and Executive Decision.
- 160395 – Air Zoo, Kalamazoo, Michigan
- 160401 – Fleet Area Control and Surveillance Facility Virginia Capes (FACSFAC VACAPES), Naval Air Station Oceana, Virginia
- 160402 - NAS Oceana Virginia Beach.
- 160403 – Midland Army Air Field Museum, Midland, Texas. Nicknamed "Fast Eagle 102", it is the sole surviving aircraft involved in the 1981 Gulf of Sidra incident.
- 160411 – Empire State Aerosciences Museum, Glenville, New York
- 160658 – NAES Lakehurst, New Jersey
- 160661 – U.S. Space and Rocket Center's Aviation Challenge facility in Huntsville, Alabama
- 160666 – Western Aerospace Museum, Oakland, California. Originally delivered to VF-111 in 1978, subsequently reassigned to NAVAIR test duties, permanently modified for development of follow-on avionics and weapons systems.
- 160684 – Pima Air and Space Museum, adjacent to Davis-Monthan AFB, Tucson, Arizona. Repainted in its original markings as "NL 211" of VF-111 aboard USS KITTY HAWK (CV-63), as this particular aircraft appeared in its initial operational squadron service, c. 1978–1981.
- 160694 – USS Lexington Museum, Corpus Christi, Texas. Former VF-51 aircraft used in the making of Top Gun. Currently painted in fictitious markings from the movie. Aircraft is on loan from the National Museum of Naval Aviation at NAS Pensacola, Florida.
- 160889 – Pacific Coast Air Museum at Charles M. Schulz Sonoma County Airport, Santa Rosa, California
- 160898 – Palm Springs Air Museum, Palm Springs, California
- 160902 – Grumman Memorial Park, Calverton, New York.
- 160903 – Mid-America Air Museum, Liberal Mid-America Regional Airport, Liberal, Kansas
- 160909 – Aviation History & Technology Center, Marietta, Georgia
- 160914 – Willmar Municipal Airport, Wilmar, Minnesota
- 160925 – Eisenhower Park, WaKeeney, Kansas
- 161134 – Valiant Air Command Warbird Museum, Space Coast Regional Airport, Titusville, Florida
- 161598 – Tulsa Air and Space Museum, Tulsa, Oklahoma. It has VF-41 "Black Aces" markings.
- 161605 –Wings of Eagles Discovery Center/National Warplane Museum, Horseheads, New York
- 161611 – Battleship Memorial Park, Mobile, Alabama
- 161615 – Combat Air Museum, Topeka, Kansas
- 161620 – Selfridge Military Air Museum, Selfridge Air National Guard Base, Mount Clemens, Michigan
- 161860 – Aviation Museum of Kentucky
- 162591 – United States Naval Academy, Annapolis, Maryland; transferred from Quonset Air Museum, North Kingstown, Rhode Island
- 162592 – Ronald Reagan Presidential Library, Simi Valley, California
- 162595 – Naval Test Wing Atlantic, Naval Air Station Patuxent River, Maryland
- 162607 – Yanks Air Museum, Chino Airport, Chino, California; partial cockpit section painted in fictitious markings from Top Gun movie.
- 162608 – Southern Museum of Flight, Birmingham, Alabama
- 162689 – USS Hornet (CV-12), USS Hornet Museum, former Naval Air Station Alameda, Alameda, California
- 162694 – MAPS Air Museum, North Canton, Ohio
- 162710 – National Naval Aviation Museum, Naval Air Station Pensacola, Florida

F-14B

- 161422 – Naval Air Station Wildwood Aviation Museum
- 161426 – DeLand Naval Air Station Museum, Florida
- 162912 – Grissom Air Museum, Grissom Air Reserve Base (former Grissom AFB), Indiana
- 162916 – Veterans of Foreign Wars (VFW) Post 8896 – Richard R. Gross Post, East Berlin, Pennsylvania
- 162926 – New England Air Museum, Windsor Locks, Connecticut (not on display in winter)
- 162911 – Estrella Warbird Museum, Paso Robles, California

F-14D(R)

- 159600 – Fort Worth Aviation Museum, Fort Worth, Texas. On loan from the National Naval Aviation Museum, Pensacola, Florida. Nicknamed "Christine", it was the longest-serving F-14 Tomcat in U.S. Navy. Remanufactured from F-14A to F-14D(R) configuration, it was originally built in 1976 and made the final combat deployment/cruise of the F-14 in 2006.
- 159610 – Smithsonian National Air and Space Museum, Steven F. Udvar-Hazy Center, Chantilly, Virginia. This F-14 was one of those involved in the second Gulf of Sidra incident.
- 159619 – Florida Air Museum at Sun 'n Fun, Lakeland Linder International Airport, Lakeland, Florida
- 159629 - Veterans Park, Kenner, Louisiana
- 161159 – National Naval Aviation Museum, Naval Air Station Pensacola, Florida. Completed the last combat flight and the last combat carrier arrested landing (trap) by a U.S. Navy F-14.
- 161163 – Prairie Aviation Museum, Bloomington, Illinois. Depot Level Conversion performed September 1991. Retired as MODEX 205 of Fighter Squadron 213 (VF-213), Black Lions.
- 161166 – Carolinas Aviation Museum, Charlotte, North Carolina

F-14D

- 157986 – USS Intrepid (CV-11), Intrepid Sea-Air-Space Museum, Manhattan, New York. 7th Tomcat built, retained as research and development airframe.
- 163893 – main gate, Arnold Engineering and Development Center, Arnold AFB, Tennessee
- 163897 – Aerospace Museum of California, McClellan Airfield (former McClellan AFB and current Coast Guard Air Station Sacramento), Sacramento, California.
- 163902 – Hickory Aviation Museum at Hickory Regional Airport, Hickory, North Carolina. VF-31 Tomcatters aircraft Modex number 107; flew the F-14 retirement ceremony with LCDR Chris Richard and LT Mike Petronis at the controls.
- 163904 – Pacific Aviation Museum, Ford Island, Joint Base Pearl Harbor–Hickam, Hawaii
- 164342 – Wings Over Miami, Miami, Florida.
- 164343 – Evergreen Aviation Museum, McMinnville, Oregon
- 164346 – Museum of Flight, Rome, Georgia. On loan from National Museum of Naval Aviation, Pensacola, Florida. Last Tomcat to operationally trap aboard a U.S. Navy aircraft carrier. It was previously displayed at Virginian Aviation Museum before being relocated to the current site upon the museum's closure.
- 164350 – Joe Davies Heritage Airpark at Palmdale Plant 42, Palmdale, California
- 164601 – Castle Air Museum at former Castle AFB, Atwater, California
- 164603 – Cradle of Aviation Museum, Garden City, New York. Felix 101 from VF-31 is the last Tomcat to fly in U.S. Navy service. Final flight was from NAS Oceana, Virginia to the American Airpower Museum at Republic Airport Long Island, New York on 4 October 2006 where it was displayed for a year and a half before being moved to Grumman Plant 25, and then to the Cradle of Aviation Museum after the Grumman facility was sold.
- 164604 – NAS Oceana Memorial Park, Naval Air Station Oceana, Virginia. Last F-14 manufactured, assigned to VX-4, later VX-9, at Naval Air Station Point Mugu, California during its operational service and used the callsign "Vandy 1".

NF-14D

- 161623 – Patuxent River Naval Air Museum, Naval Air Station Patuxent River, Lexington Park, Maryland. It is a former VX-23 flight test squadron aircraft.

== Specifications (F-14D) ==
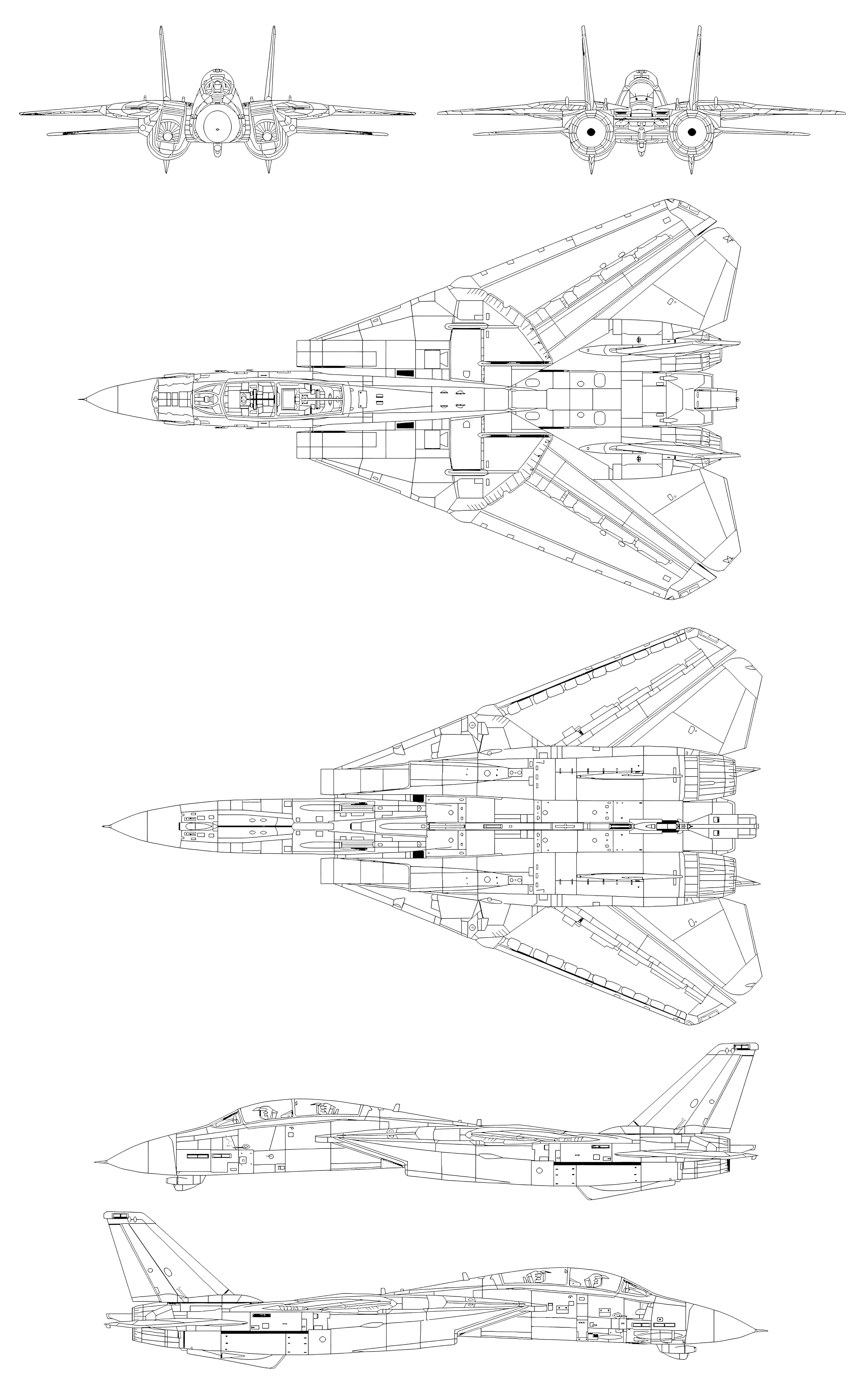
Schematic diagram (F-14D)

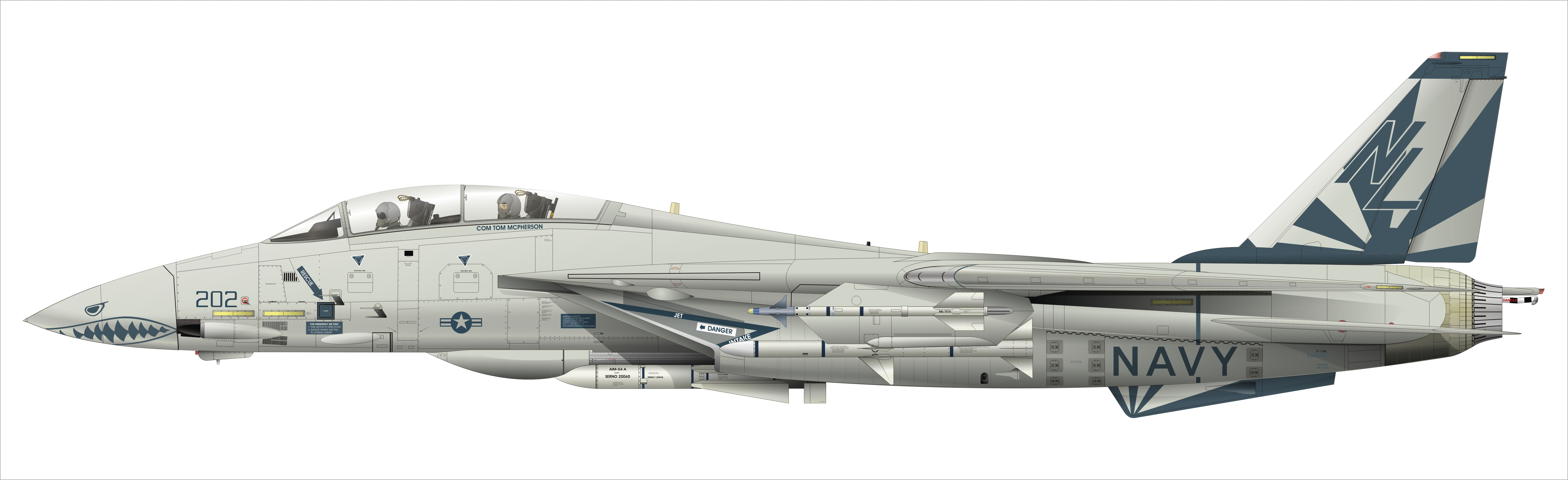
F-14A of VF 111 "Sundowners" (USS Carl Vinson)

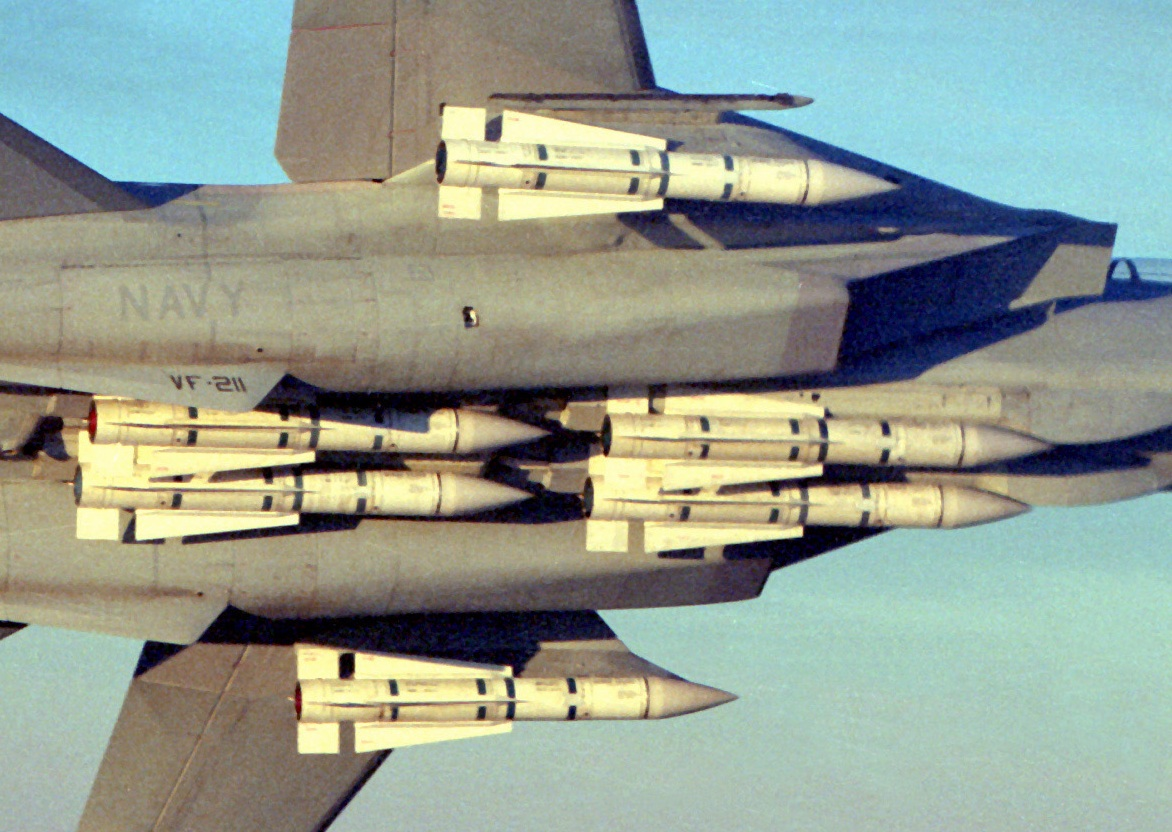
F-14B from the VF-211 Fighting Checkmates carrying six AIM-54 Phoenix missiles

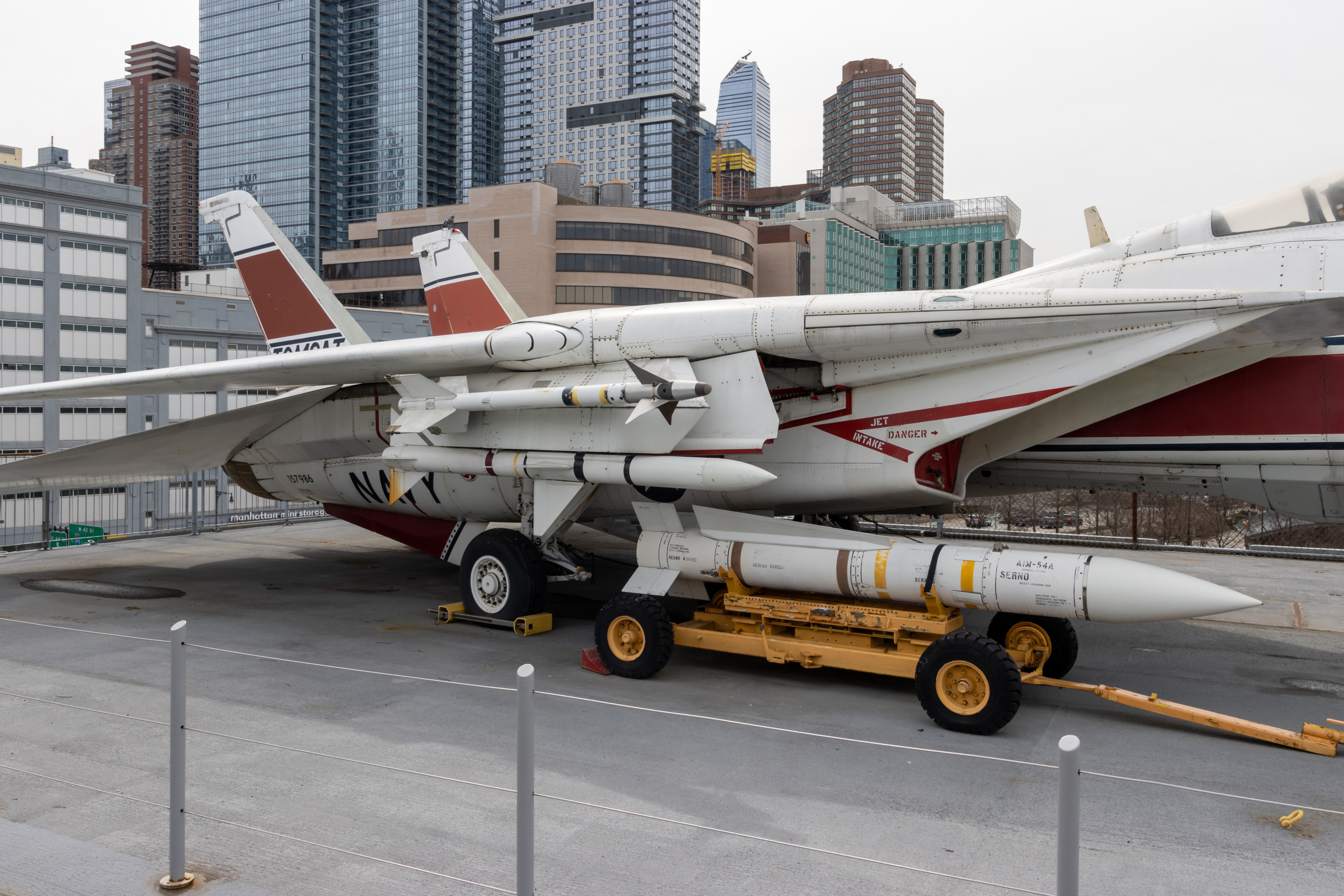
Intrepid Museum display showing Sidewinder (upper), Sparrow (middle) and Phoenix (bottom) missiles

Data from U.S. Navy file, Spick, Flight International March 1985

General characteristics

- Crew: 2 (pilot and radar intercept officer)
- Length: 62 ft 9 in (19.13 m)
- Wingspan: 64 ft 1.5 in (19.545 m)
- Swept wingspan: 38 ft 2.5 in (11.646 m) swept
- Height: 16 ft (4.9 m)
- Wing area: 565 sq ft (52.5 m^{2}) wings only
  - 1,008 sq ft (94 m^{2}) effective area including fuselage
- Airfoil:
  - Grumman (1.74)(35)(9.6)-(1.1)(30)(1.1) root
  - Grumman (1.27)(30)(9.0)-(1.1)(40)(1.1) tip
- Empty weight: 43,735 lb (19,838 kg)
- Gross weight: 61,000 lb (27,669 kg)
- Max takeoff weight: 74,350 lb (33,725 kg)
- Fuel capacity: 16,200 lb (7,348 kg) internal fuel; 2 × optional 267 US gal (222 imp gal; 1,010 L) / 1,756 lb (797 kg) external drop tanks
- Powerplant: 2 × General Electric F110-GE-400 afterburning turbofans, 16,333 lbf (72.65 kN) thrust each dry, 26,950 lbf (119.9 kN) with afterburner (Note: These figures are static, sea-level uninstalled thrust. Static, sea-level installed thrust is 13,800 lbf (61 kN) at military power and 23,600 lbf (105 kN) in full afterburner. At Mach 0.9 at sea-level, installed thrust is 30,200 lbf (134 kN) in full afterburner.)

Performance

- Maximum speed: Mach 2.34, 1,544 mph (1,342 kn; 2,485 km/h) at 40,000 ft (12,190 m)
  - Mach 1.2, 794 kn (914 mph; 1,470 km/h) at sea level
- Cruise speed: 420 kn (480 mph, 780 km/h)
- Stall speed: 118 kn (136 mph, 219 km/h) power-off
- Range: 1,600 nmi (1,800 mi, 3,000 km)
- Combat range: 503 nmi (579 mi, 932 km) fighter escort
  - 204 nmi (235 mi; 378 km) deck launched intercept
  - 150 nmi (170 mi; 280 km) fleet air defense with 1.91 hours of loiter (Note: All figures are for external stores loading of 2× AIM-54, 2× AIM-7, 2× AIM-9, 2× 267 U.S. gal fuel tanks.)
- Service ceiling: 53,000 ft (16,000 m) plus
- g limits: +7.5 g (+6.5 g operational limit) (Note: The g limit was operationally limited by the U.S. Navy to +6.5 g to increase service life.)
- Rate of climb: 45,000 ft/min (230 m/s) plus
- Wing loading: 96 lb/sq ft (470 kg/m^{2})
  - 48 lb/sq ft (230 kg/m^{2}) effective
- Thrust/weight: 0.88 at gross weight (1.02 with loaded weight & 50% internal fuel)
- Takeoff roll: 2,500 ft (760 m)
- Landing roll: 2,400 ft (730 m)

Armament

- Guns: 1× 20 mm (0.787 in) M61A1 Vulcan 6-barreled rotary cannon, with 675 rounds
- Hardpoints: 10 total: 6× under-fuselage, 2× under nacelles and 2× on wing gloves (Note: The hardpoints between nacelles include two on centerline plus four others next to nacelles. Points between nacelles can only carry a maximum of four missiles at one time. Each wing glove can carry one large pylon for larger missiles, with one rail on the outboard side of the pylon for a Sidewinder.) with a capacity of 14,500 lb (6,600 kg) of ordnance and fuel tanks, with provisions to carry combinations of:
  - Rockets: 7x LAU-10 rocket pods (for a total of 28 rockets)
  - Missiles: AIM-54 Phoenix, AIM-7 Sparrow, AIM-9 Sidewinder air-to-air missiles (Note: Loading configurations: 2× AIM-9 + 6× AIM-54 (Rarely used due to weight stress on airframe); 2× AIM-9 + 2× AIM-54 + 3× AIM-7 (Most common load during Cold War era); 2× AIM-9 + 4× AIM-54 + 2× AIM-7; 2× AIM-9 + 6× AIM-7; 4× AIM-9 + 4× AIM-54; 4× AIM-9 + 4× AIM-7)
  - Bombs:
    - JDAM precision-guided munition (PGMs)
    - Paveway series of laser-guided bombs
    - Mk 80 series of unguided iron bombs
    - Mk 20 Rockeye II cluster munition
  - Other:
    - Tactical Airborne Reconnaissance Pod System (TARPS)
    - LANTIRN Targeting System (LTS) pod (AN/AAQ-14)
    - 2× 267 US gal (1,010 L; 222 imp gal) drop tanks for extended range/loitering time

Avionics

- Hughes AN/APG-71 radar
- AN/ALR-67 radar warning receiver
- AN/AAS-42 infrared search and track, AAX-1 TCS
- AN/ASN-130 Inertial navigation system
- Remotely Operated Video Enhanced Receiver (ROVER) upgrade

== Tomcat logo ==
Tomcat logo

The Tomcat logo design came when Grumman's Director of Presentation Services, Dick Milligan, and one of his artists, Grumman employee Jim Rodriguez, were asked for a logo by Grumman's Director of Business Development and former Blue Angels No. 5 pilot, Norm Gandia. Per Rodriguez, "He asked me to draw a lifelike Tomcat wearing boxing gloves and trunks sporting a six-shooter on his left side, where the guns are located on the F-14, along with two tails." The cat was drawn up after a tabby cat was sourced, used for photographs, and named "Tom". The logo has gone through many variations, including one for the then–Imperial Iranian Air Force F-14, called "Ali-cat". The accompanying slogan, "Anytime Baby!" was developed by Norm Gandia as a challenge to the U.S. Air Force's McDonnell Douglas F-15 Eagle.

== Notable appearances in media ==
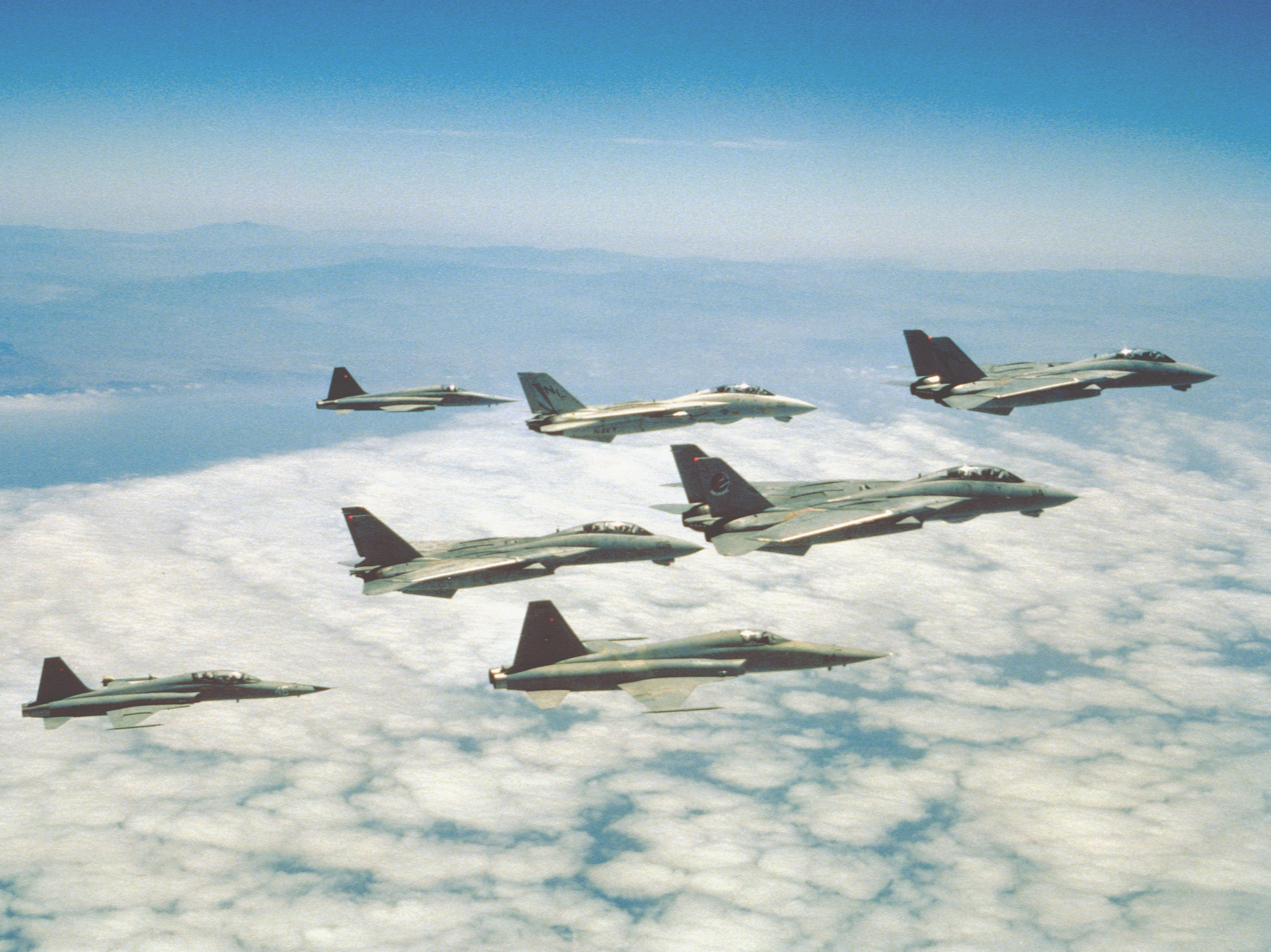
F-14A Tomcats of Fighter Squadrons VF-51 "Screaming Eagles" and VF-111 "Sundowners" in formation with F-5E/F Tiger IIs. The squadrons provided F-14s for filming aerial sequences in the movie Top Gun.

The Grumman F-14 Tomcat was central to the 1986 film Top Gun. The aviation-themed film was such a success in creating interest in naval aviation that the US Navy, which assisted with the film, set up recruitment desks outside some theaters. Producers paid the US Navy $886,000 (equivalent to $2,652,000 in 2025) as reimbursement for flight time of aircraft in the film with an F-14 billed at $7,600 (equivalent to $22,800 in 2025) per flight hour. The F-14 Tomcat was also featured in the sequel, Top Gun: Maverick (2022). Two F-14As of VF-84 from USS Nimitz were featured in the 1980 film The Final Countdown, with four from the squadron in the 1996 release Executive Decision. The television series JAG frequently used stock footage of the F-14 from other media, including Top Gun. Multiple F-14s are featured in the 2008 documentary Speed & Angels, featuring the story of two young Navy officers working to achieve their dream of becoming F-14 fighter pilots. The F-14 served as an inspiration for various fictional aircraft, most notably the Macross franchise's VF-1 Valkyrie and the Skystriker XP-14F from the G.I. Joe: A Real American Hero toyline. Actual F-14s were featured in the first episode of Macross Zero, the OVA prequel to Super Dimension Fortress Macross (adapted as Robotech in the US).

== See also ==
- Fourth-generation jet fighter
- Grumman XF10F Jaguar
- Teen Series

Related development

- General Dynamics–Grumman F-111B

Aircraft of comparable role, configuration, and era

- Dassault Mirage G8
- McDonnell Douglas F-15 Eagle
- Mikoyan MiG-31
- Mikoyan-Gurevich MiG-27
- Mikoyan-Gurevich MiG-23
- Panavia Tornado
- Sukhoi Su-27
- Sukhoi Su-33
- McDonnell Douglas F-4 Phantom II

Related lists

- List of fighter aircraft
- List of military aircraft of the United States
- List of military electronics of the United States
