= Nick Buckles =

British businessman

- Born: Nicholas Peter Buckles; 1 February 1961 (age 65)
- Education: Lanchester Polytechnic
- Occupation: Businessman
- Years active: 1983–2013
- Title: Former Chief Executive, G4S plc
- Term: 2005–2013
- Successor: Ashley Almanza

Nicholas Peter Buckles (born 1961) is a British businessman.

== Biography ==
=== Early career ===
He was born on 1 February 1961. At the age of sixteen, he had his first job as a Christmas postman in Essex. He then went on to study business at Lanchester Polytechnic.

=== Securicor and G4S ===
He joined Securicor in 1985 as a project accountant. He served as Deputy Chief Executive and Chief Operating Officer of G4S plc from May 2004 to July 2005. Later he served as the Chief Executive Officer of G4S from 2005 to 2013. In 2011 he announced, that G4S will acquire the danish ISS A/S in a deal worth £5.2 billion. The deal was later shelved, owing to shareholder unrest. He initially kept his job, despite the fiasco at the 2012 Summer Olympics, but stood down on 31 May 2013 and was succeeded by Ashley Almanza, formerly of BG Group. He was also Chairman of the Ligue Internationale des Sociétés de Surveillance, the international association of leading security companies.

He has said his hero is Margaret Thatcher because "she led the biggest economic turnaround in recent history."
