= Barrie Gane =

British spy (1935–2023)

Barrie Charles Gane CMG OBE (September 19, 1935 – December 10, 2023) was a British spy officer of the Secret Intelligence Service (SIS).

== Early life and education ==
Born in Birmingham, Gane attended King Edward VI School and later served as a midshipman in the Royal Navy during his national service. He was the first in his family to attend university, studying history at Corpus Christi College, Cambridge.

== Career ==
Gane joined the SIS in 1960 and had his first posting in Laos during a period of Laotian Civil War. His career included assignments in Sarawak, Uganda, Hong Kong, and Northern Ireland, where he focused on intelligence diplomacy and planning covert operations. Promoted to Controller Far East, he was involved in supporting the mujahideen in Afghanistan against the Soviet invasion in 1979. His subsequent roles included Controller Europe and director of operations, during which he oversaw a reevaluation of SIS operations following the end of the Cold War.

After retiring in 1992, Gane worked for G4S.

== Personal life ==
Gane was married twice; his first marriage, to Elizabeth Higlett, ended in divorce. He is survived by two daughters from his first marriage and his second wife, Jenny Pitt, with whom he had a lengthy marriage. Gane died of a stroke in 2023.
