= Carlton Bolling =

Location
- Undercliffe Lane; Bradford, West Yorkshire, BD3 0DU; England; 53.80208°N 1.73867°W

Information
- Type: Academy
- Motto: Excellence for all
- Established: 1977
- Local authority: City of Bradford
- Trust: Carlton Academy Trust
- Department for Education URN: 147100 Tables
- Ofsted: Reports
- Head of School: Mohammed Azum
- Age: 11 to 16
- Enrolment: 1482
- Website: http://www.carltonbolling.co.uk/

Carlton Bolling is a co-educational secondary school, located in Bradford, West Yorkshire, England. It has more than 1,400 pupils.

== History ==
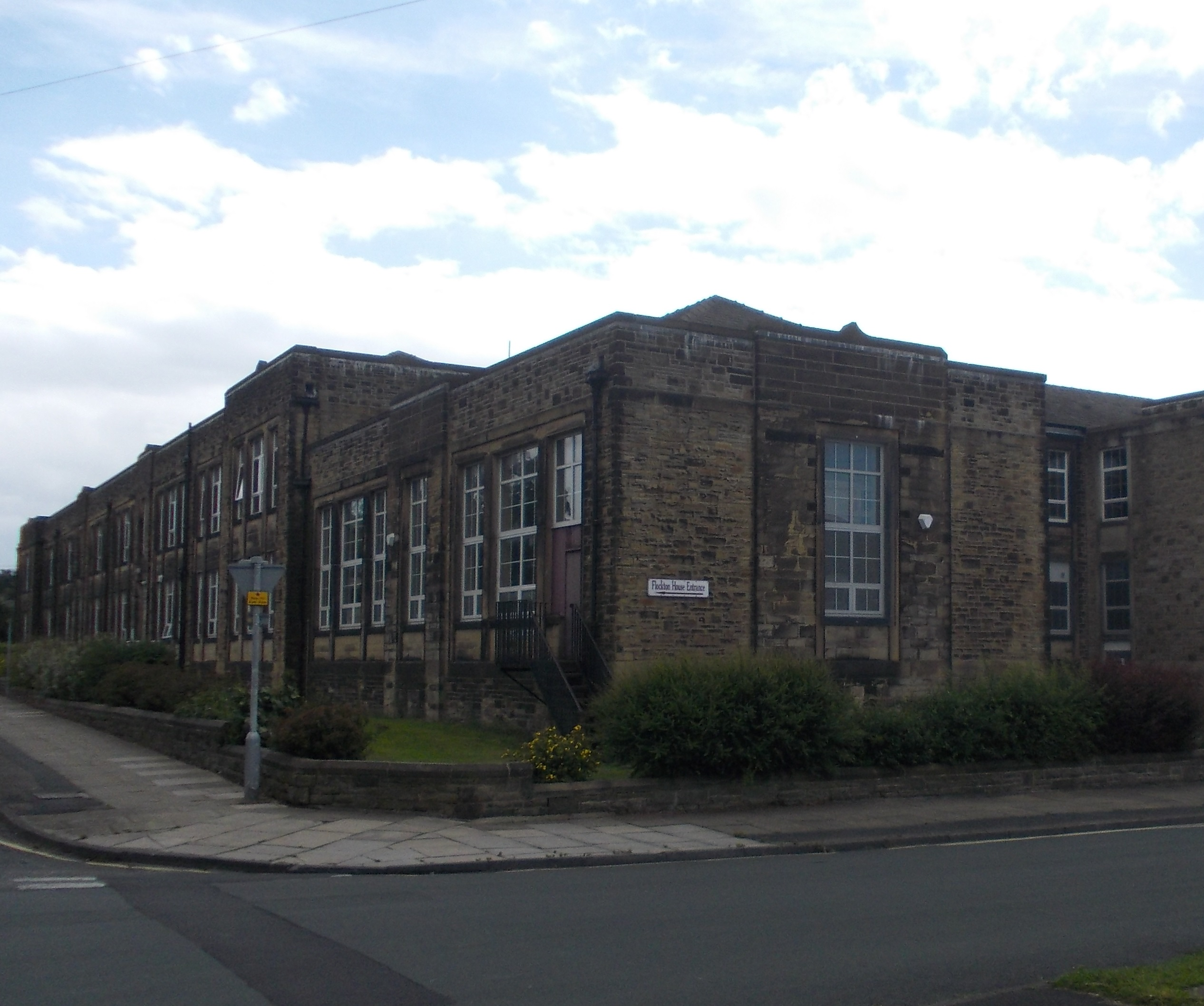
Flockton House, 2014

There were originally two single-sex grammar schools. Carlton Grammar School (for boys) was on Manor Row in Carlton House. The former school site was destroyed in a fire in 1949. Bolling Girls' Grammar School opened in 1931 on Sheridan Street next to Bolling Hall, although the address later became Flockton Road in East Bowling. By the early 1970s, the girls' school had 650 girls, with 100 in the sixth form; the boys' school had 500 boys with 60 in the sixth form. They merged in 1977 to become Carlton Bolling School. The former girls' school became Bolling College, an adult education college, and Flockton House, which was demolished in 2015 to make way for housing.

Bolling Girls' Grammar School had a student choir which was widely known and highly regarded around Bradford. The choir continued after the merger with Carlton Grammar School with membership open to female students. The choir was in high demand for performances at venues around the local area particularly during the Christmas period. It also performed at the annual Festival of Remembrance at St George's Hall. The repertoire consisted mostly of show tunes with a particular show being chosen each academic year e.g. South Pacific. Traditional Christmas songs and carols were also performed as well as a special arrangement of Jingle Bells. More challenging musical pieces such as César Franck's Panis angelicus were also included. In 1979, the choir participated in a student exchange with students from Bradford's German Twin City Mönchengladbach. The choir ceased to exist following the retirement of the music teacher responsible for it.

In the 1980s, under the leadership of Dr Mervyn Flecknoe, its modular curriculum, elected student councils, and three-session day with an emphasis on tutorial contact and continuity were picked out by HMI for praise and the school was included as a model case study by Mortimore and Mortimore (1991) "The Secondary Head: Roles, Responsibilities and Reflections". The name changed from Carlton Bolling Upper School to Carlton-Bolling College (for ages 13–19) and offered free places on post-16 courses to unemployed adults, with a free crèche, to improve education in the Undercliffe area of Bradford. The intake of the school became overwhelmingly Muslim with many heritage languages during the late 1980s and early 1990s as the roll rose to 1400 students with a sixth form of 300. The college formed part of a consortium at sixth form level with Hanson Upper School and Eccleshill Upper School; a minibus took students to the location of post-16 courses which were planned across the three establishments.

On 15 March 1993, the school featured in a Panorama documentary called A Class Apart about the emergence of an underclass in Asian communities in Britain, narrated by Martin Bashir. The headteacher complained to the Broadcasting Complaints Commission that the college was statistically misrepresented in a negative light. The BCC upheld three of his complaints.

In September 2006, Carlton Bolling College acquired specialist college status for mathematics and computing.

In 2014 BBC Radio Four implicated the school's involvement in the Trojan Horse Scandal which enforces Islamist views through the board of governors.

In 2017, the new campus was built at the same location and features a 3-floor building for mainstream education with a dedicated sports centre. The college then became a secondary school, with its name changing from Carlton Bolling College to Carlton Bolling. Now, the Carlton Bolling campus features an on-site boxing academy where students who have trouble learning at the main building are sent. A dedicated "Technical Studies Centre", situated on Undercliffe Lane, off Newlands Place, is dedicated to subjects such as creative studies, health and social care/child development and construction. The sports centre features a sports hall and 2 small PE rooms, as well as boy/girl changing rooms. The school is also equipped with a 3G multi-purpose pitch as well as a tennis court.

Previously a community school administered by City of Bradford Metropolitan District Council, in June 2019 Carlton Bolling converted to academy status with the academy now being run by its own Carlton Academy Trust. Carlton Bolling, in recent years, has received many awards/status' such as the "World Class" school status and OFSTED's "Outstanding" rating numerous times.

== Academic performance ==
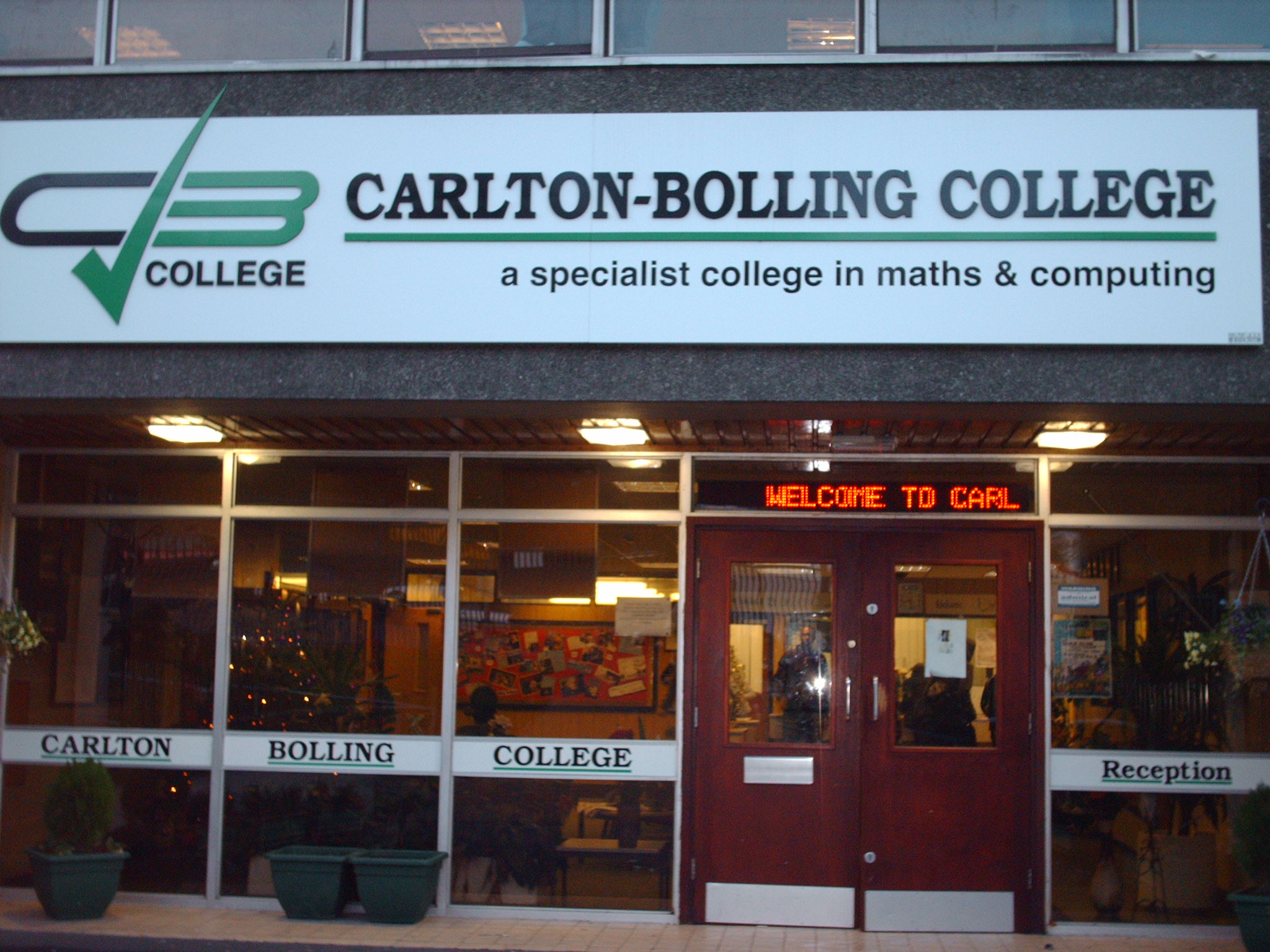
Carlton Bolling College Entrance circa 2006

In March 2007, Carlton Bolling College was inspected by Ofsted and were ranked the first school in Bradford to get an outstanding result.

In 2008, 47.6% of students achieved 5 or more A*-C grades at GCSE levels and 26% including English & Maths. Its average A/AS-Level points per students score was 442.1.

From 29% 5A*-C with English and Mathematics in summer of 2009, the results from summer of 2010 were at 36%. This significant uplift continued to summer of 2011 to 43%. This is a 14% improvement over 2 years. Summer 2010 student A Levels average = C,C,C. Summer 2011 student A Levels average = B,B,C. Many students moved on to a variety of university courses such as law, medicine, engineering, business, ICT, health related studies, teaching and many more.

In the summer of 2014 Ofsted placed the school in 'special measures'.

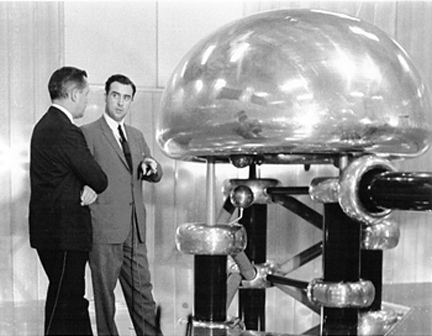
Albert Crewe (right) at the Zero Gradient Synchrotron (ZGS), inventor of the scanning electron microscope in the late 1960s, winning the Duddell Medal and Prize in 1980

== Notable former pupils ==
- Colin Brazier, news presenter for The Live Desk (Sky)
- Steve Rhodes, cricketer (wicket keeper) who played for England
- Tony Wright (musician), lead singer of Terrorvision

=== Bolling Girls' Grammar School ===
- Mollie Hillam, potter
- Prof Phyllis Hodgson, Professor of English Language and Mediæval Literature from 1955 to 1972 at Bedford College (London), winner of the Sir Israel Gollancz Prize in 1971
- Brenda Jagger, author

=== Carlton Grammar School ===
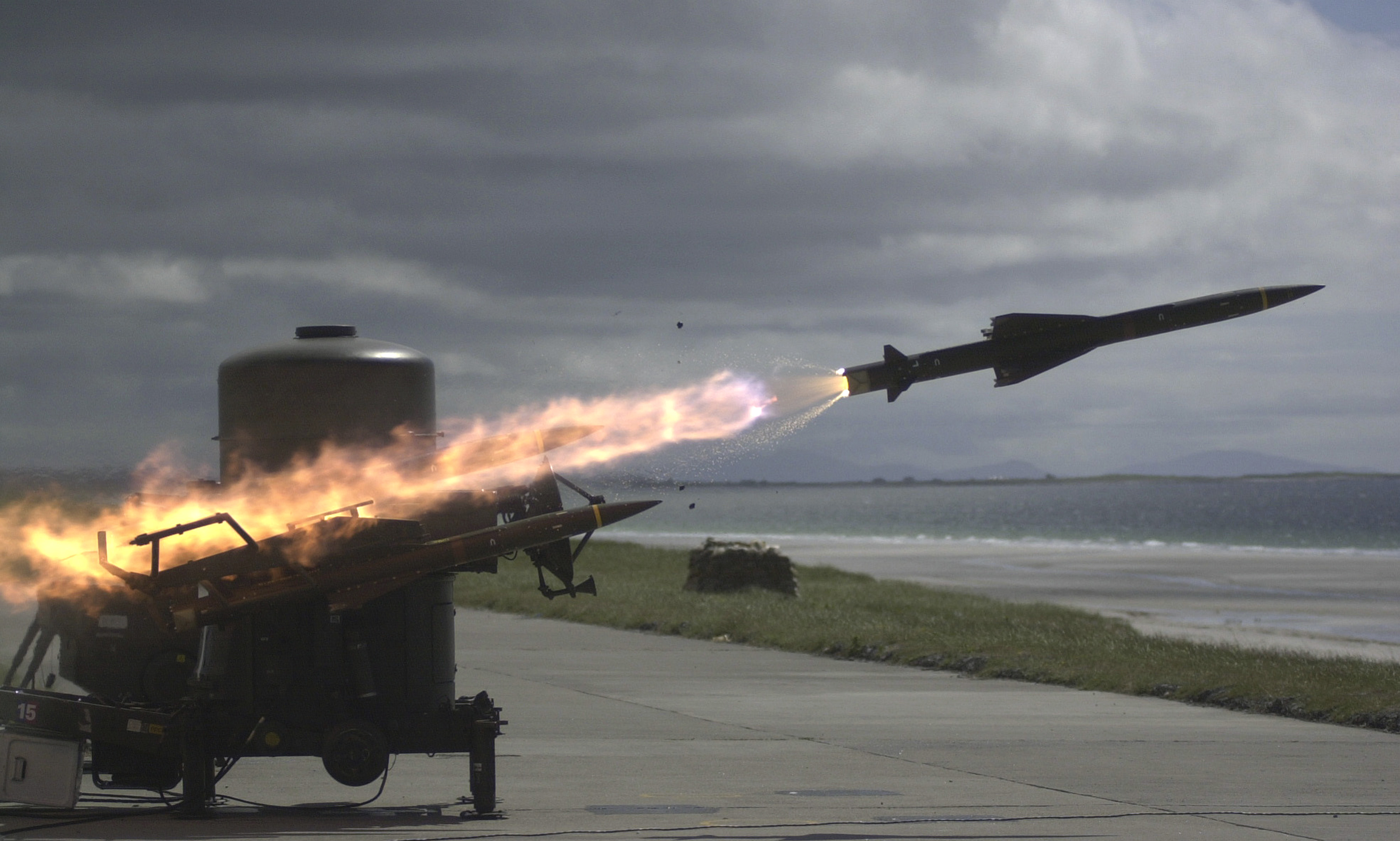
Rapier missile developed by Colin Baron, at BAC's Guided Weapons Division in Stevenage in the late 1960s

- Colin Baron, Director-General of Weapons Research at the MoD from 1976 to 1981, and who with John Twinn invented and developed the (cheap but not so effective) Rapier missile system, used in the Falklands War by the 12th Regiment Royal Artillery
- Jeff Bland, Michelin-starred chef at the Balmoral Hotel in Edinburgh
- Dave Brady, folk musician
- Willie Brooke, Labour MP from 1929 to 1931 for Dunbartonshire, and from 1935 to 1939 for Batley and Morley
- Harry Corbett OBE, puppeteer, inventor of Sooty (the longest running children's TV show in the UK)
- Prof Albert Crewe, Professor of Physics from 1963 to 1996 at the University of Chicago and Enrico Fermi Institute, and Director from 1961 to 1967 of the famous Argonne National Laboratory (became a US citizen in 1961)
- Sir Fred Haigh, clothier
- Len Shackleton, footballer
- Bernard Worsnop FInstP, physicist and expert on X-rays, who worked with Edward Appleton at King's College London, and was later headmaster from 1937 to 1958 of Quintin School
