= John C. Wooley =

American scientist

John Culver Wooley
- Born: July 27, 1945
- Died: April 20, 2015 (aged 69)
- Education: Michigan State University (BS); University of Chicago (PhD)
- Scientific career
- Fields: Biophysics; Computational biology; Bioinformatics
- Workplaces: University of California, San Diego; National Science Foundation; U.S. Department of Energy
- Doctoral advisor: Albert V. Crewe

John Culver Wooley (July 27, 1945 – April 20, 2015) was an American biophysicist and research administrator whose work was pivotal in establishing bioinformatics and computational biology as recognized scientific fields in the United States. He served as associate vice chancellor for research at the University of California, San Diego (UC San Diego), and co-founded and was the managing editor of one of the first bioinformatics journals, the Journal of Bioinformatics and Computational Biology (JBCB).

== Early life and education ==
Wooley earned a bachelor's degree in physics, chemistry, and biochemistry from Michigan State University. He completed a Ph.D. in biophysics at the University of Chicago in 1975, working with physicist Albert V. Crewe on high-resolution scanning transmission electron microscopy for studying chromatin structure. Wooley was the son of Jean (née Culver) Wooley and Chalmers Wooley of Illinois.

== Career ==
After a faculty appointment at Princeton University, Wooley joined the National Science Foundation (NSF) in 1984. He became the founding director (1988) of NSF's new Division of Infrastructure and Resources—now the Division of Biological Infrastructure (DBI)—overseeing cross-cutting biology research infrastructure and training programs and advancing the integration of computing with biology. He was the Director for the NSF's Division of Instrumentation and Resources and helped lead NSF's contributions to the Human Genome Program's early years.

He created the first U.S. federal programs to fund research in bioinformatics and computational biology, explicitly aimed at strengthening the interface between computing and biology. During this period, he also sponsored workshops that brought structural and computational scientists together to plan modernization of the Protein Data Bank (PDB)—moving from flat files to a searchable resource. At NSF, for his role in advocating, establishing, and leading the Biological Instrumentation Facilities and the Biological Research Centers, Wooley received NSF's top performance award, the "NSF Superior Accomplishment."

Wooley subsequently served in the U.S. Department of Energy (DOE) as Deputy Associate Director in the Office of Health and Environmental Research (OHER), within the Office of Energy Research (later the Office of Science), by 1993. He later served as Chief of Staff and Deputy Associate Director in the DOE Office of Science, coordinating major aspects of the Human Genome Project (including bioinformatics) and leading efforts in microbial genomes and computational structural biology.

In addition to leading agency roles important for the Human Genome Project, Wooley chaired the National Research Council committee that produced Catalyzing Inquiry at the Interface of Computing and Biology (2005), a widely cited study on research and education at the computing–biology interface. He also served as a working-group leader at the CRA–NIH Computing Research Challenges in Biomedicine Workshop (Bethesda, 2006), a meeting that produced recommendations for NIH, NSF, and DOE collaborations at the computing–biomedicine interface. Later, he was appointed as a Special Government Employee to the federal Biomass Research and Development Technical Advisory Committee (BIOAC) (DOE/USDA) from 2004 to 2010.

== Research and leadership ==
Wooley's research spanned structural genomics, bioinformatics, and metagenomics, often emphasizing infrastructure and education. At UC San Diego, he helped build cross-disciplinary initiatives linking advanced computing and the life sciences and was associated with projects such as the Joint Center for Structural Genomics (JCSG) and the CAMERA metagenomics cyberinfrastructure effort.

== Personal life and death ==
Wooley died on April 20, 2015, at age 69, after a long battle with cancer. He was survived by his wife, Su-Yun (Su) Chung, and their son.

== Selected publications ==
- Wooley, John C.; Godzik, Adam; Friedberg, Iddo (2010-02-26). "A Primer on Metagenomics". PLOS Computational Biology. 6 (2) e1000667. Bibcode:2010PLSCB...6E0667W. doi:10.1371/journal.pcbi.1000667. PMC 2829047. PMID 20195499.
- Zhang, Y.; Thiele, I.; Weekes, D.; Li, Z.; Jaroszewski, L.; Ginalski, K.; Deacon, A. M.; Wooley, J.; Lesley, S. A.; Wilson, I. A.; Palsson, B.; Osterman, A.; Godzik, A. (2009). "Three-dimensional structural view of the central metabolic network of Thermotoga maritima". Science. 325 (5947): 1544–1549. Bibcode:2009Sci...325.1544Z. doi:10.1126/science.1174671. PMC 2833182. PMID 19762644.
- Sun, S.; Chen, J.; Li, W.; Altintas, I.; Lin, A.; Peltier, S.; Stocks, K.; Allen, E. E.; Ellisman, M.; Grethe, J.; Wooley, J. (2011). "Community cyberinfrastructure for Advanced Microbial Ecology Research and Analysis: the CAMERA resource". Nucleic Acids Research. 39 (Suppl_1): D546–D551. doi:10.1093/nar/gkq1102. PMC 3013694. PMID 21045053.
- Li, Weizhong; Wooley, John C.; Godzik, Adam (2008-10-15). "Probing Metagenomics by Rapid Cluster Analysis of Very Large Datasets". PLOS ONE. 3 (10) e3375. Bibcode:2008PLoSO...3.3375L. doi:10.1371/journal.pone.0003375. PMC 2557142. PMID 18846219.
