= Rocksteady (disambiguation) =

Rocksteady is a musical genre, a predecessor of reggae, that was most popular in Jamaica in the 1960s.

Rocksteady or Rock Steady may also refer to:

== Music ==
=== Albums ===
- Rock Steady (album), or the title song, by No Doubt, 2001
- Rock Steady with Flo & Eddie, by Flo & Eddie, 1981
- Rocksteady (Big Head Todd and the Monsters album), or the title song, 2010

=== Songs ===
- "Rock Steady" (All Saints song), 2006
- "Rock Steady" (Aretha Franklin song), 1971
- "Rock Steady" (Bonnie Raitt and Bryan Adams song), 1995
- "Rock Steady" (The Whispers song), 1987
- "Rock Steady", by Alton Ellis
- "Rock Steady", by Bad Company from Bad Company
- "Rocksteady", by The Bloody Beetroots
- "Rocksteady", by Marc Broussard from Carencro
- "Rock Steady", by Namie Amuro from 60s 70s 80s
- "Rocksteady", by Remy Shand from The Way I Feel
- "Rock Steady", by Sting from ...Nothing Like the Sun
- "Rock Steady (I'm Rough and Ready)", by Steppenwolf from Rock & Roll Rebels
- "Rock Steady, Pt. 2", by Pete Rock from Soul Survivor

== Other uses ==
- Rocksteady Studios, a British video game developer
- Rock Steady Group, a British event security company based in Edinburgh
- Rock Steady (film), a 2002 film starring Victor Rasuk
- Rocksteady, a character from Teenage Mutant Ninja Turtles; see Bebop and Rocksteady

== See also ==
- Rocksteddy, a Filipino alternative rock band
