= G4S Secure Solutions d.o.o. =

Serbian security company

G4S Secure Solutions
- Native name: Г4С Безбедносна Решења
- Company type: d.o.o.
- Industry: Security services
- Predecessor: Progard Securitas
- Founded: 20 July 1992; 33 years ago
- Headquarters: Bulevar Peka Dapčevića 32, Belgrade, Serbia
- Area served: Serbia
- Key people: Aleksander Dawid Sold (Director)
- Services: Guarding, Monitoring, Cash handling, Analyzing-Consulting, Security education, Sale of Security systems
- Revenue: ▲€27.74 million (2017)
- Net income: ▼€0.27 million (2017)
- Total assets: ▲€11.30 million (2017)
- Total equity: ▲€4.71 million (2017)
- Owner: G4S
- Number of employees: 3,510 (2017)
- Parent: G4S
- Subsidiaries: G4S Securuty Services Crna Gora
- Website: www.g4s.rs

G4S Secure Solutions (Društvo za privatno obezbeđenje G4S Secure Solutions d.o.o) is a Serbian security company specialized in guarding, monitoring, cash handling, analyzing-consulting, security education and in sale of security systems.

== History ==
It was founded under the name Progard Securitas in 1992 by former Deputy Chief of Belgrade Police Department, Miroslav Gojković.

In May 2008, G4S acquired an 85% shareholding in the company.
