= Ashley Almanza =

South African businessman (born 1963)

- Born: Ashley Martin Almanza; 27 March 1963 (age 63)
- Education: University of Natal; London Business School
- Occupation: CEO of G4S

Ashley Martin Almanza (born 27 March 1963) is a South African businessman, who has been the chief executive officer (CEO) of G4S plc since 1 June 2013.

== Education ==
Almanza has a degree in Commerce and a postgraduate diploma in Accounting, both from the University of Natal, South Africa. He later received an MBA from London Business School.

== Career ==
Almanza trained as a chartered accountant.

In 1993, Almanza joined British Gas PLC (now demerged as BG Group and Centrica) as Finance Manager in their Exploration and Production division. After serving in a variety of role, including Group Finance Director of BG Group from August 2002, until he left on 31 March 2011.

On 1 June 2013, he became CEO of G4S plc, replacing Nick Buckles. He faced a pay revolt in 2019 over a £239,638 cash payment he was due to receive to bolster his retirement. The Investment Association, which represents British institutional shareholders, is understood to have given the payment an “amber top” rating, alerting members that it raises potential concerns. According to the Financial Times, Almanza "was paid £1.46m in 2013 – a 23 per cent rise from his predecessor Nick Buckles in 2012".

Almanza is also a director of Schroders and Noble Corporation.
