= Argenbright Security =

American airport security company

Argenbright Security is an Atlanta-based subsidiary of Securicor that has operated security at airports across the United States, including Philadelphia International Airport and Chicago's O'Hare International Airport.

Through a contract with United Airlines, Argenbright operated passenger security checkpoints at Dulles International Airport, where five hijackers passed through before boarding American Airlines Flight 77 on September 11, 2001. United Airlines also contracted with Argenbright to manage its security operations at Newark Liberty International Airport, where the hijackers on United Airlines Flight 93 passed through.

Argenbright managed some security operations at Boston's Logan International Airport for US Airways, Delta Air Lines, Delta Shuttle and America West. However, Argenbright did not manage the specific checkpoints the hijackers passed through before boarding American Airlines Flight 11. American Airlines contracted its security operations at Logan to Globe Aviation Services. United Airlines contracted with Huntleigh USA to manage its security operations at Logan, including the checkpoint where hijackers on United Airlines Flight 175 passed through. In November 2001, the Massachusetts Port Authority decided not to renew Argenbright's license to operate security at Logan.

Argenbright, founded in 1979 by Frank Argenbright, was sold to the British firm, Securicor, in December 2000 for an initial cash payment of $185 million.
