= Colin Baron =

British engineer

Colin Baron (20 May 1921 – 7 November 1987) was a British engineer from Yorkshire who designed weapon systems, namely anti-aircraft missiles (surface-to-air missiles), for the Ministry of Defence (UK).

== Early life ==
He was the son of John Baron and Dorothy Crumpler. He was born in Nottingham. He attended a boys' grammar school (Carlton Bolling College since 1977) in the south-east of Bradford, then in the West Riding. From the University of Leeds he gained a BSc in Physics 1941 and an MSc in 1947.

== Career ==
=== Royal Radar Establishment ===
At the RRE he did research on microwaves, which led to him becoming a division leader on guided weapons.

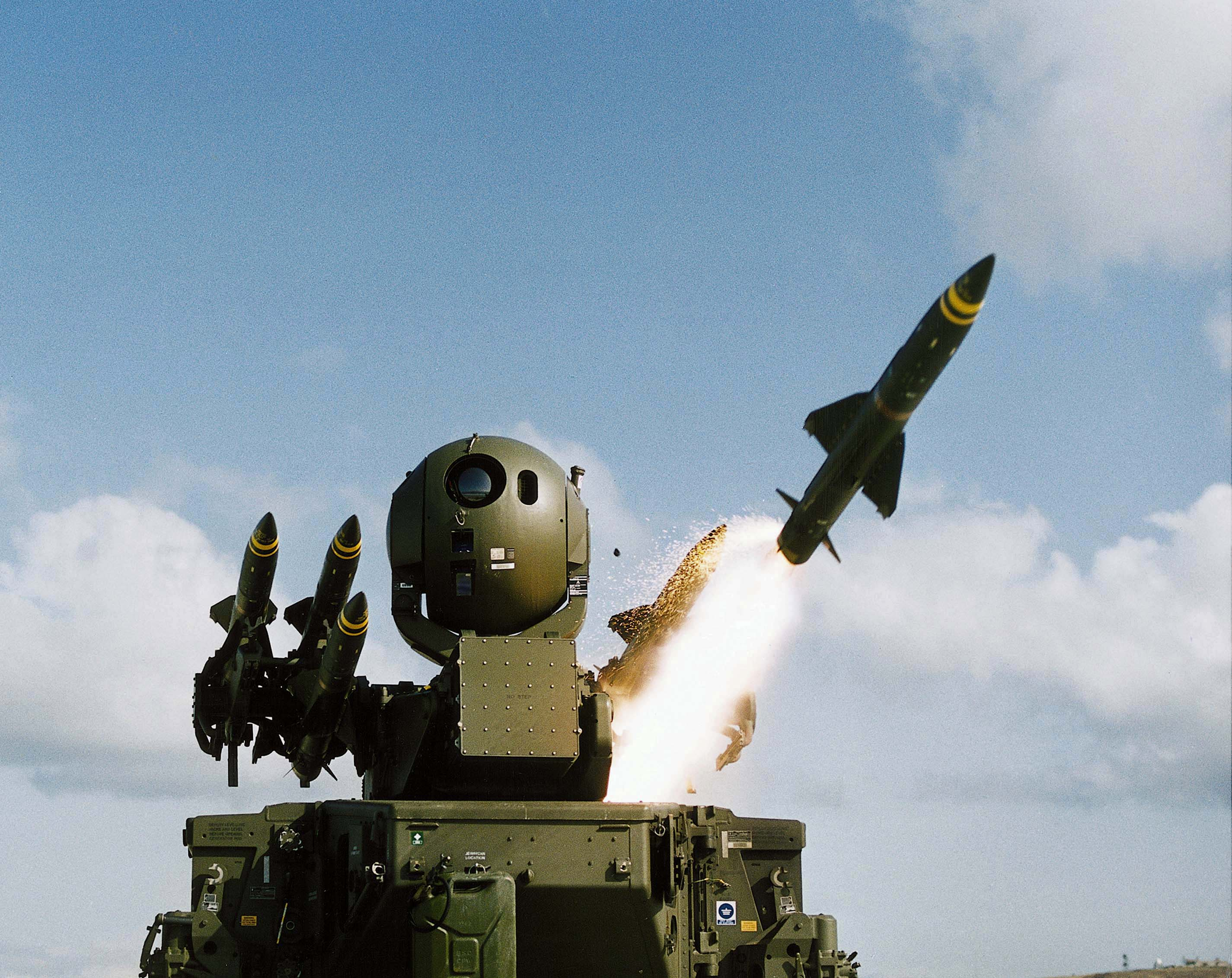
Rapier missile in 2001

=== Royal Aircraft Establishment ===
At the RAE he became Head of the Guided Weapons Assessment Research Group in 1966. He later became Head of Avionics in 1970, then Flight Systems in 1974.

=== Rapier missile ===
From 1958 he had worked with Cambridge-educated John Twinn in developing an affordable guided missile that could knock out low-flying aircraft. The Army was more interested in artillery with proximity fuses. The cost of providing a missile with radar guidance was an expensive solution. The solution was to employ a Command to Line of Sight Guidance System (CLOS), whereby the missile contained no radar. The missile system had a system that optically tracked the aircraft and missile.

It was given to BAC who developed it further as the Rapier missile; it entered service in 1971.

== Personal life ==
He married Margaret Whalley in 1942 in Bradford; they had a son (born 1944) and daughter (born 1943). He lived in Upton-upon-Severn. He married Anita Hale in 1961 in Worcester; he had a step-son. In his later life he lived in Farnham, Surrey. He died at the age of 66.

== See also ==
- Category:Cold War surface-to-air missiles of the United Kingdom
- Category:Missile guidance

Government offices
Preceded by	Director General of Research at the Ministry of Defence; 1977–1981	Succeeded by
Preceded by	Director General of Weapons Research at the Ministry of Defence (United Kingdom); 1976–1977	Succeeded by
