= Hashmira =

Israeli security technologies company

Hashmira is an Israeli security technologies company established in 1937. It offers guard services, operational training, electronic security, surveillance, financial services, cleaning and maintenance services, and personnel services. Hashmira is a subsidiary of the international security services company G4S. Hashmira is the largest private security company in Israel, with 15,000 employees and 50 company branches.

== History ==
Hashmira was founded by Moshe Shermister, who immigrated to Palestine from Lithuania. Shermister worked as a policeman for the British Mandate. In 1937, he left the police and established Hashmira to protect Jewish businesses in Tel Aviv for a monthly fee. In 1942, the demand for protection increased in the wake of drunken brawls involving Polish and Austrian soldiers stationed in Palestine. After the establishment of the state of Israel, when the country went through an austerity period, the Ministry of Commerce and Industry hired Hashmira to protect food depots. Following the Six-Day War, the company grew from 500 employees to 2,500 when it was hired to protect facilities and workers across the Green Line.

== New technologies ==
In 2005, Hashmira began operating an electronic surveillance program for convicts and detainees in collaboration with Dmatek, a manufacturer of supervision equipment and control rooms. The program allows the police and courts to monitor a convict's moves by electronic surveillance, thereby reducing the number of convicts in prison.

== Criticism ==
In 2004, an investigative program on Israeli television discovered that the company has been violating Labour law and had failed to pay its employees travel expenses, overtime and dismissal compensation. In 2005, 350 Hashmira security guards sued the company for violations of their legal rights.

In June 2006, the Knesset Internal Affairs Committee discussed the company's labour law violations. In October 2006, a committee of the Ministry of Justice discussed the renewal of its operating license due to the allegations that the company has been violating the rights of thousands of security guards. The committee made the renewal of the license in 2008 conditional on modifications of the company's firing and pension payment policies.
