= Albert Crewe =

American physicist (1927–2009)

Albert Victor Crewe
- Born: February 18, 1927; Bradford, England
- Died: November 18, 2009 (aged 82); Chesterton, Indiana, United States
- Citizenship: American
- Education: University of Liverpool
- Known for: Scanning transmission electron microscopy
- Scientific career
- Fields: Physics
- Workplaces: University of Chicago, Argonne National Laboratory

Albert Victor Crewe (February 18, 1927 – November 18, 2009) was a British-born American physicist and inventor of the modern scanning transmission electron microscope capable of taking still and motion pictures of atoms, a technology that provided new insights into atomic interaction and enabled significant advances in and had wide-reaching implications for the biomedical, semiconductor, and computing industries.

== Early life and education ==
Crewe was born in Bradford, England, in 1927 and grew up during World War II in a blue collar community still recovering from the worldwide depression. The family was poor and expectations were limited. He had average grades in school but passed two nationwide examinations, the first of which enabled him to become the first in his family to attend high school and the second of which allowed him to attend college. He attended Carlton Grammar School, in the south-east of Bradford, since 1977 called Carlton Bolling College. He won a military scholarship to the University of Liverpool to pursue an undergraduate degree in physics, which he received in 1947. He received a first class degree with high honors, which allowed him a scholarship to continue on at Liverpool for his Ph.D. At the age of 24 he was hired by the university as an instructor in physics and received his degree one year later, in 1951.

== Synchrocyclotron research ==
At the University of Liverpool, Crewe worked with Professor Skinner, the Lyon Jones Chair of Physics. Skinner and his team were in the process of building a synchrocyclotron accelerator and wanted to improve on existing technology by extracting the circulating beam to produce an external one, a feat which had never been accomplished. Skinner gave Crewe the responsibility for extracting the beam and he proved successful, using an innovative peeler-regenerator system. A few years later a team of physicists from the University of Chicago, sent by Enrico Fermi, went to Liverpool for help in solving a similar problem with the Chicago synchrocyclotron. That visit led to an invitation for Crewe to go to the University of Chicago as a visiting research associate in 1955. A year later, after he and a theoretical physicist succeeded in getting the cyclotron to work, the University of Chicago hired Crewe as an assistant professor.

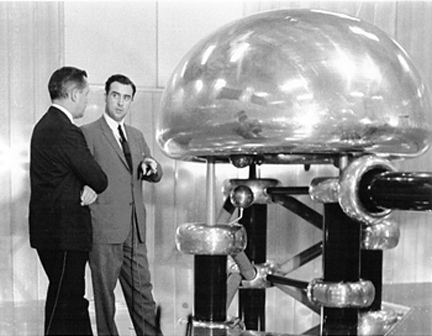
Crewe (right, facing camera) explains the ZGS's Cockroft-Walton preaccelerator.

In 1958 Crewe moved to the Argonne National Laboratory, in DuPage County, Illinois. One of the U.S. government's oldest and largest science and engineering research laboratories, Argonne is managed for the U.S. Department of Energy by the University of Chicago. After the war, Argonne was given the mission of developing nuclear reactors for peaceful purposes. A large accelerator was being planned at Argonne, and Crewe was part of a team recruited to make sure that the machine would be state of the art. After Congress approved the machine Crewe was made director of the Particle Accelerator Division at Argonne. When Norman Hilberry, the director of Argonne, retired in 1961, Crewe was asked to become the third director of the 5000 employee facility.

== Electron microscopy ==
While at Argonne Crewe became interested in electron microscopy, an interest stimulated by the major biology program there. Crewe saw ways in which it would be possible to improve the images important to that work. He came up with a design for a scanning electron microscope and set up a group at Argonne to build it, getting it to function in 1963. This work became so interesting to Crewe that in 1967 he decided to leave Argonne and return to the university's physics faculty, which had granted him a full professorship in 1963.

In 1964 Crewe developed the first field emission electron gun in collaboration with Hitachi, a new type of electron source that enabled much higher optical quality than had previously been possible. This gun, combined with inventions in electron lenses and detection, led to the development of the highest resolution microscope at that time. In 1970 his field emission scanning transmission electron microscope succeeded in taking images individual atom (though not the first, this achievement usually being credited to Erwin Muller). In 1975 he was successful in obtaining the first motion pictures of atoms, providing new insight into atomic interaction and material formation.

There followed, during the 1980s, a series of important refining techniques. In 1980 he invented a method for the correction of spherical aberration in electron optical systems using sextupoles and, in 1996, Crewe invented a new type of focusing lens for low voltage scanning microscopes. He held 19 patents for his inventions, and had more than 275 publications, most of them concerned with electron optics and electron microscopes.

Beginning in the 1970s and continuing to the present day commercial electron microscopes were developed based on Crewe's innovations. These systems enabled significant advances in the biomedical, pharmaceutical, and semiconductor industries. Hitachi Corporation produced the first successful commercial version of the field emission scanning electron microscope in 1970 which received an IEEE Milestone award in 2012. Crewe was a consultant to Hitachi in this effort. Since that time Hitachi has produced over 5300 cold field emission scanning electron microscopes and over 4000 (Schottky) thermal field emission scanning electron microscopes. They are considered the highest resolution instruments available and cost over one million USD each to build. Today there are over 5000 field emission microscopes operational in semiconductor fabrication facilities worldwide, enabling companies like Intel and IBM to produce the latest and fastest microprocessors.

Crewe served as Dean of Physical Sciences at the University of Chicago from 1971 to 1981. In 1977 was named the William E. Wrather Distinguished Service Professor, and from 2002 he was the Wrather Distinguished Service Professor Emeritus. He continued to explore new methods of obtaining high resolution, and in 2003 developed a low voltage electron microscope using a dipole permanent magnet as a lens.

== Honors ==
Crewe's distinguished scientific career and his contribution to the use of technologies for wider applications have been recognized by numerous awards. The Chicago Citizenship Council nominated him Outstanding New Citizen in 1962, and in the same year he received the Immigrants Service League's Annual Award for Outstanding Achievement in the Field of Science, and was named Chicago Man of the Year in Science. He won the Man of the Year Award for Industrial Research in 1970 and was awarded the Albert A. Michelson Medal from the Franklin Institute in 1977 and the Distinguished Service Award of the Electron Microscope Society of America in 1976. He became a member of the National Academy of Sciences in 1972. In 1979 he received the Ernst Abbe Award of the New York Microscope society. In the U.K. he received the Duddell Medal of the Institute of Physics in 1980 and he held honorary fellowships in America, Great Britain, and China, as well as honorary degrees from several universities in America as well as from the University of Liverpool.
