= Rock Steady Group =

Rocksteady
- Industry: Security, Public Safety
- Founded: 1980
- Defunct: 2008
- Fate: Merged with Group 4 Securicor
- Successor: G4S
- Headquarters: Edinburgh, Scotland, UK
- Key people: Mark Hamilton, (Managing Director)

Rock Steady Group was a group of companies that was involved in stewarding and security at many major events in the United Kingdom. The three companies were Rock Steady Event Services, Rock Steady Sport Event Services and Rock Steady Security. The Group had a head office and operations office in Edinburgh with additional operations offices at Glasgow, Sheffield & Manchester.

== History ==
In 2004 the company bought out the FPC Security company, thus gaining the Carling Academy, The Barrowlands, the Arches and the ABC in Glasgow.

In March 2008 it was announced that the group had been bought by G4S and was to be re-branded as G4S Events.

== Services ==
Rock Steady Events teams were used in stewarding capacity at major music events in Scotland, including T in the Park, the SECC and the Carling Academy Glasgow. In England they were responsible for Stewarding at the V Festival in Staffordshire, Lancashire County Cricket Club, Manchester and Don Valley Stadium and Sheffield Arena both in Sheffield.

Rock Steady Security provided security staff for mainly the bar and restaurant trade. In England and Wales (and since 1 November 2007 also in Scotland) Rock Steady security personnel were licensed by the Security Industry Authority, allowing them to conduct licensable activities as defined by the Private Security Industry Act 2001.

Rock Steady Sports Events provided stewarding and hospitality services for many major footballing clubs. In Scotland, Rock Steady provided all stewarding services to Rangers F.C., Kilmarnock FC, Heart of Midlothian FC, Hibernian FC, St Johnstone FC, Dunfermline Athletic F.C. and were used in tandem with other companies at other stadiums in the Scottish Premier League. Six Nations rugby at Murrayfield, Scotland national football matches at Hampden Park and other sporting events, such as the Glasgow Marathon were also stewarded by Rock Steady. In England the Group was responsible for stewarding at Old Trafford Cricket Ground, Burnley FC & Rochdale FC working in tandem with others at Leeds United and Huddersfield Town.
