= Rapier (missile) =

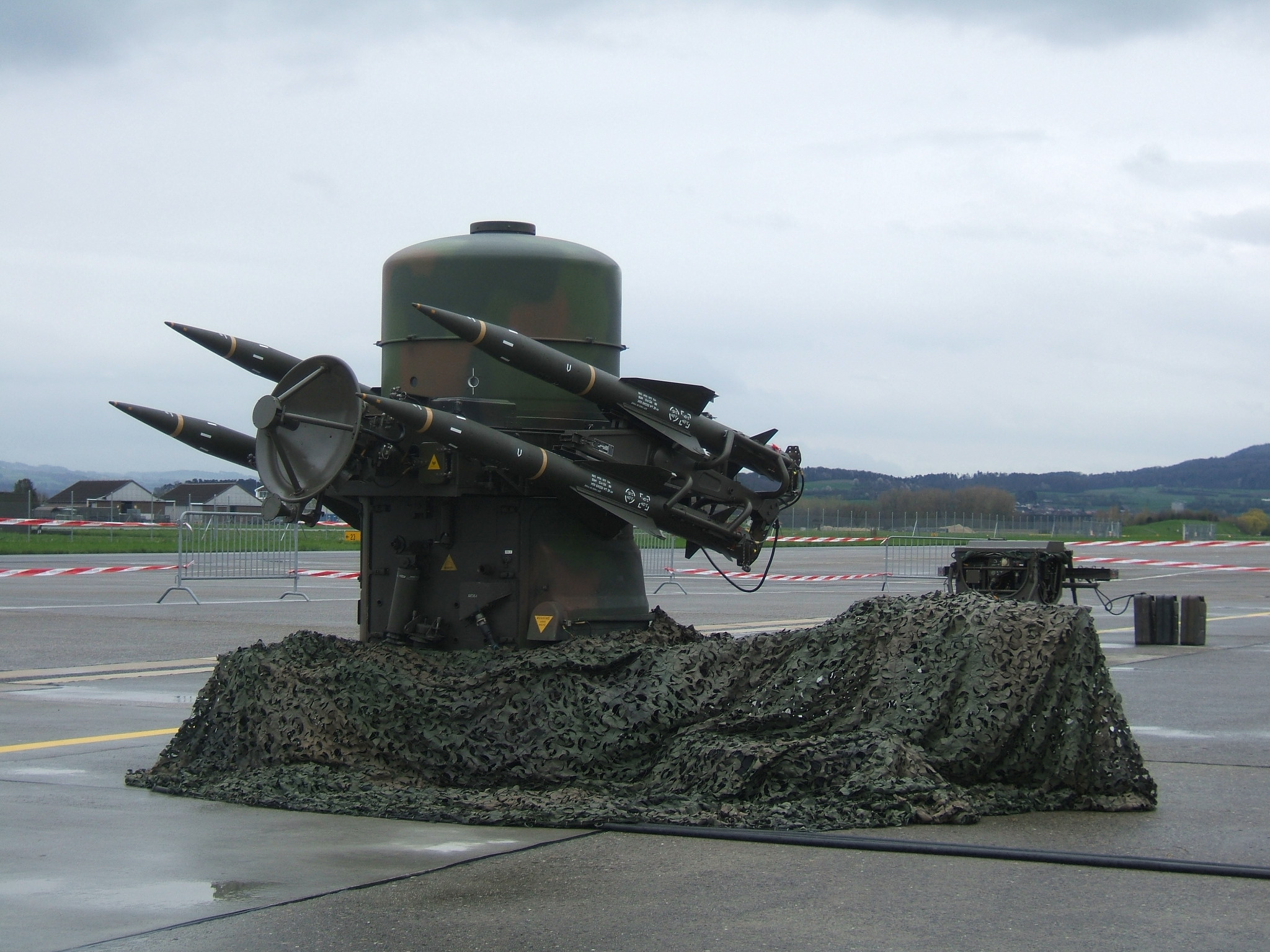
- A Swiss Air Force Rapier SAM installation with the detached generator set sited approximately 20 metres from the launcher. Fuel is being supplied to the generator from one of the three jerrycans grouped adjacent to it (one in use and two spare).
- Type: Surface-to-air missile
- Place of origin: United Kingdom

Service history
- In service: 1971–present
- Used by: See operators
- Wars: Falklands War; Iran–Iraq War; Gulf War

Production history
- Designer: British Aircraft Corporation
- Designed: 1963
- Manufacturer: British Aircraft Corporation (1963–1977); BAe Dynamics (1977–1999); MBDA UK (since 1999)
- Produced: 1969–1990s
- No. built: ≈25,000 missiles, 600 launchers and 350 radars
- Variants: Mk1 ("Hittile"), Mk2B (Missile)

Specifications
- Mass: 45 kg (99 lb)
- Length: 2.235 m (88.0 in)
- Diameter: 0.133 m (5.2 in)
- Wingspan: 0.138 m (5.4 in)
- Warhead: Blast fragmentation
- Detonation mechanism: Proximity triggered
- Engine: solid-fuel rocket
- Operational range: 400–8,200 m (1,300–26,900 ft)
- Flight ceiling: 3,000 m (9,800 ft) (Mk1 missile), 5,000 m (16,000 ft) (Mk2)
- Maximum speed: Mach 3 (3,700 km/h; 2,300 mph)
- Guidance system: Semi-automatic command to line of sight
- Steering system: flight control surface
- Launch platform: vehicle or trailer

Rapier is a surface-to-air missile developed for the British Army to replace their towed Bofors 40/L70 anti-aircraft guns. The system is unusual as it uses a manual optical guidance system, sending guidance commands to the missile in flight over a radio link. This results in a high level of accuracy, therefore a large warhead is not required.

Entering service in 1971, it eventually replaced all other anti-aircraft weapons in British Army service; both the Bofors guns used against low-altitude targets and the Thunderbird missile used against longer-range and higher-altitude targets. As the expected air threat moved from medium-altitude strategic missions to low-altitude strikes, the fast reaction time and high manoeuvrability of the Rapier made it more effective than either of these weapons, replacing most of them by 1977.

Rapier was later selected by the RAF Regiment to replace their Bofors guns and Tigercat missiles. It also saw international sales. In October 2021, it was replaced as one of the UK's primary air-defence weapons by Sky Sabre.

== History ==
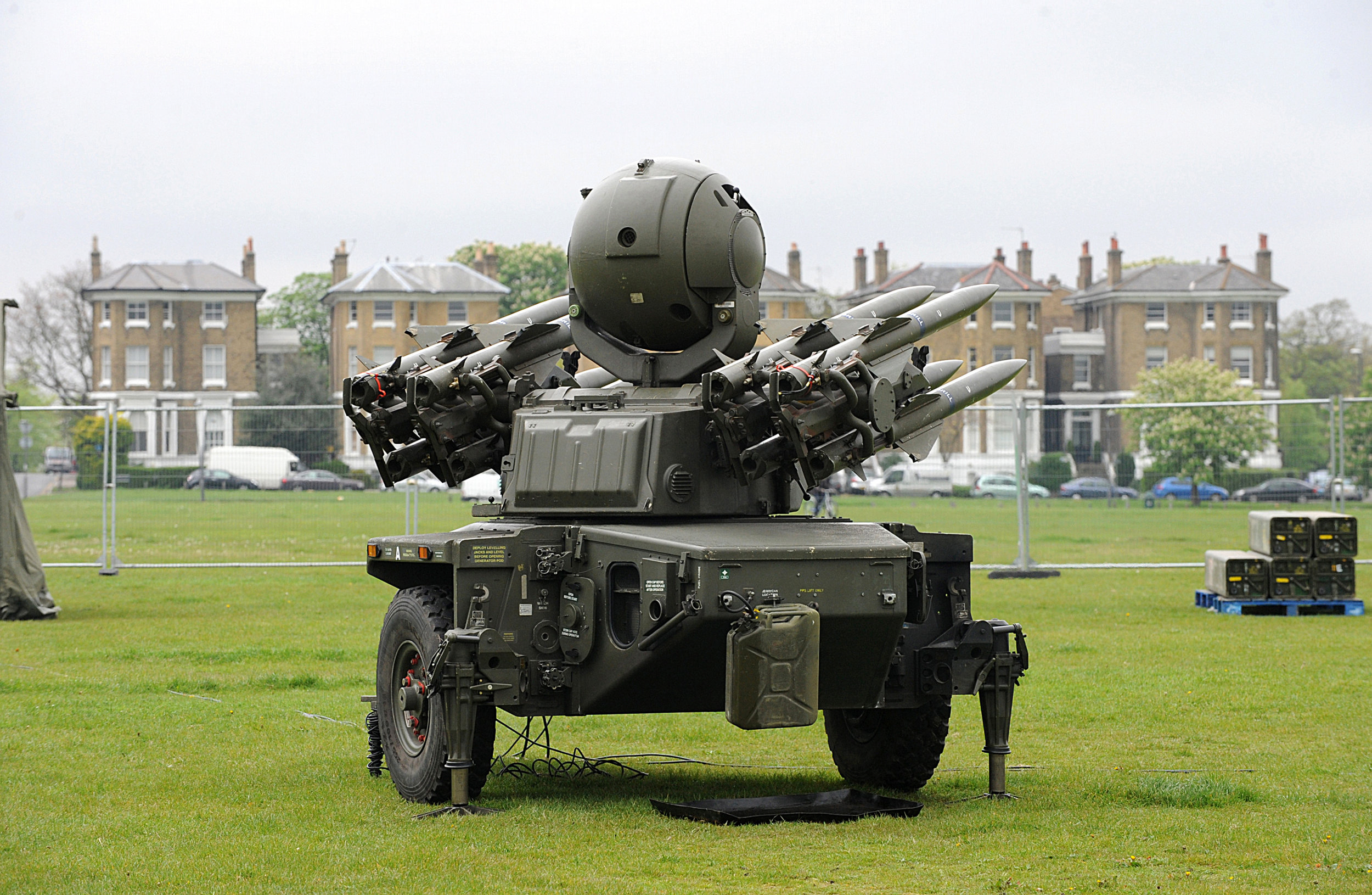
A Rapier FSC Ground Based Air Defence (GBAD) system at Blackheath, London on 2 May 2012

=== Earlier systems ===
The introduction of medium-range surface-to-air missiles, or surface-to-air guided weapons (SAGW) as they are known in the UK, had made flying at medium or high altitudes anywhere near the front line near suicidal. In response, air forces began introducing aircraft and weapons meant to be used at low altitudes, in nap-of-the-earth flying that used landforms to block the view of the aircraft from the radar systems on the missiles.

By the late 1950s, the British Army considered this threat considerable as new aircraft like the Sukhoi Su-7 became common and higher performance designs were in the pipeline. Against low-flying aircraft, only anti-aircraft guns were suitable, as they could be quickly swung and fired in seconds. However, the relatively short range of their Bofors 40/L56 guns meant they had only a very short period of time in which the aircraft was close enough to fire on.

To improve this, the Army began the development of a massively improved weapon known as "Red Queen". This used a large 42 mm (1.7 in) revolver cannon for high rates of fire. Despite making progress, in 1959, the General Staff concluded that guns were no longer useful against modern aircraft. For their immediate needs they purchased the updated Bofors 40/L70, and for the longer term began a new missile development for a short-range, rapid-reaction weapon, known as the Light Anti-Aircraft (LAA) system.

=== PT.428 ===
The initial design contest for the LAA was won by British Aircraft Corporation (BAC) in 1960, and given the development name PT.428. This called for a system that could be carried on a single 4-ton Bedford TK truck. The firing unit was a single piece that would normally be placed on the ground during operation, but could be fired from the truck in an emergency. The system was deliberately designed to fit, when taken apart, as a single load in the Fairey Rotodyne. The system was quite advanced, including automated search and track radars, a separate television camera for target identification, and eighteen missiles in two nine-round boxes.

As budget pressures escalated in the early 1960s, the Army was given the choice of picking either PT.428 or their Blue Water nuclear missile. They chose the latter, a decision Solly Zuckerman found rather questionable. The Army officially replaced PT.428 with the similar but slightly less advanced MIM-46 Mauler from the United States. Mauler combined a search radar and nine missiles using either radar or infrared guidance on a single M113-derived vehicle. The concept was similar to PT.428, but larger and with fewer missiles.

=== Sightline ===
During the development of PT.428, BAC had also considered a lightweight version of the system which mounted six of the PT.428 missiles on a trailer that could be towed by a pickup version of the Land Rover. An early warning radar would be mounted on a framework above the roof of the truck, and initial tracking would be manual using a pair of binoculars mounted on a gimbal system in the truck bed. A small antenna on the launcher trailer would communicate with the missile to bring it into alignment with the binoculars and then follow semi-active radar homing (SARH) from that point.

When PT.428 ended in 1961, BAC began considering less-expensive options based on the same general concept. During this time, Colin Baron and John Twinn at the Royal Aircraft Establishment were developing an optical semi-automatic command to line of sight (SACLOS) system. Using this with the PT.428 missile produced the Sightline concept, which would be much less expensive than the original radar-guided version.

The next year, Mauler was downgraded on its way to being cancelled, leaving both the US and British Army with no modern short-range anti-aircraft systems. The General Staff and Air Staff responded by issuing the combined GASR.3132 requirement for a clear-weather daytime SAM for both the Army and the RAF Regiment. Whether GASR.3132 was designed for Sightline, or Sightline for GASR.3132, is not clear in existing references. The new concept was given the name "Defoe". An even smaller and cheaper system lacking an early warning radar was also considered under GASR.3134.

=== Rapier ===
In 1963, Defoe was made official, given the development target ET.316. BAC management initially gave it the name "Mongoose", but during a board meeting the issue arose that no one knew what more than one mongoose was called; mongooses? mongeese? The name "Rapier" was suggested and made official.

As development continued, it became increasingly clear that the Rapier was far more a formidable weapon than initially expected. The optical tracking system was so accurate that the missile almost always hit the target aircraft, so despite its small warhead and lack of a proximity fuze it almost guaranteed a kill. BAC joked that the system was a "hit-ile", as opposed to a "miss-ile". It also became clear that the warning radar system would be invaluable in the field, and the radar-less GASR.3134 was dropped.

The first test firings of the missile took place in 1966. The system was extensively tested at Woomera, considerably supported by the Australian Army, an early user of the Rapier system.

In 1965, some Australian staff at Woomera began to develop a simulator system to understand and tune the manual guidance system. This consisted of a joystick from the Rapier optical tracker which caused the projected image of the missile to move about. Models of the missile and various target aircraft were constructed and filmed using stop motion techniques to make a selection of films of various target attack sequences across the Woomera sky. The system was completed in 1968. In initial testing, tracking was seen to be a serious problem, and the British Army was concerned the system would be beyond the capabilities of the average gunner. Some problems were solved by adjusting the joystick's mechanical feedback to more closely match the missile's difficulty responding to various inputs. Many of the remaining issues were subsequently solved via a massive simulation run and data processing using an IBM 7090. Complete systems were tested in 1968, with a subsequent production contract in 1969.

On a parallel track, the RAF Regiment had been looking for a short-range weapon for airfield defense. Eventually, this led to the development of the Tigercat system in 1967, an adaptation of the Seacat naval surface-to-air missile system. Tigercat was similar to Rapier in basic concept, but based on older technologies and thus somewhat larger and heavier while offering less range and much slower speeds. Tigercat was introduced into service with No 48 Squadron RAF Regiment in 1968, giving the RAF Regiment the UK's first effective fully air portable low-level SAM system and valuable experience in operating systems of this type. In 1972 a trials unit known as the Rapier Pilot Battery was formed jointly by No 63 Squadron RAF Regiment and 9 (Plassey) Light Air Defence Battery Royal Artillery. Comprehensive trials ended in 1973 and the first Rapier unit in British service, No. 63 Squadron, deployed to its operational station in Germany in mid-1974.

In the 1980s, a new training simulator system was constructed in Stevenage. This consisted of a 10-metre (33 ft) radius hemispherical dome whose inside surface was used as a movie screen onto which terrain images were projected. A copper vapor laser projected images of targets and the missiles in-flight on top of the background imagery, while a smaller helium-neon laser simulated the Rapier's tracking flare. A complete Rapier targeting unit was placed in the center of the dome, and its guidance signals were captured and sent to the simulator to update the position of the missile. The projected laser imagery was bright enough that it could be tracked by IR imagers and seekers, allowing it to be used with the updated Darkfire versions of the Rapier with their IR cameras, or other IR seeking missiles like the Stinger. This system was sold separately for use with other missile systems under the name British Aerospace Microdome.

== Variants ==
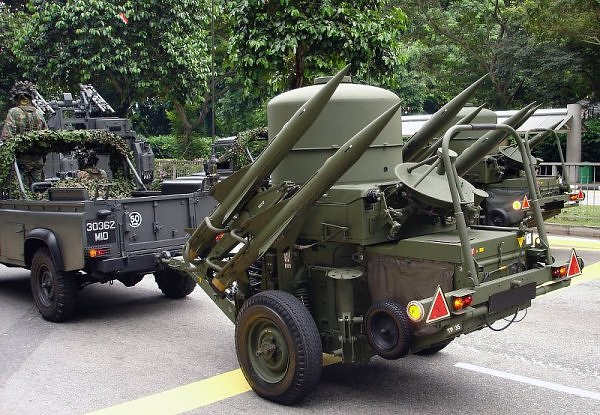
A Republic of Singapore Air Force Rapier SAM system

The original Rapier took the form of a two-wheeled launcher carrying four missiles, an optical tracker unit, a generator, and a trailer of reserve missiles. The launcher consists of a vertical cylindrical unit carrying two missiles on each side, the surveillance radar dish and "Identification Friend or Foe" (IFF) system under a radome on top, the guidance computer and radar electronics at the bottom, and a prominent parabolic antenna for sending guidance commands to the missiles on the front.

The search radar, of the pulsed Doppler type, has a range of about 15 kilometres (9 mi). The aerial, located at the top of the launcher, rotates about once a second, looking for moving targets through their Doppler shift. Upon detecting a target, a lamp lights up on the Selector Engagement Zone (SEZ) — a box containing 32 orange lamps arranged in a circle about the size of an automobile steering wheel. The radar operator can use switches to blank out returns from other directions, providing jamming resistance.

The optical tracker unit comprises a stationary lower section housing the operator controls and a rotating upper section containing the tracking optics. The operator's optical system is a modified telescope containing a Dove prism to prevent the image 'toppling' as the optics rotate in azimuth. Using this system means that, unlike a periscope, the operator does not have to move to track the target. The upper section also contains a separate missile tracking system that follows the operator's optics, based on a television camera optimized for the IR band.

Upon detection of a target, the optical tracking system is slewed to target the azimuth supplied by the SEZ; the operator then searches for the target in elevation. The operator's field of view is selected based on the target's range: "wide" at about 20 degrees or "track" at about 4.8 degrees. When the target is found, the operator switches to "track" and uses a joystick to keep the target centred in the telescope. Once a steady track is established, the missile is fired. The TV camera on the tracker is tuned to track four flares on the missile's tail. Like the operator's telescope, the TV system has two views: about 11 degrees wide for the initial "capture", and 0.55 degrees for mid-course tracking.

The location of the missile relative to the line of sight is measured using a system identical to the "chopper" system used in early infrared homing missiles. The chopper is inside the launcher, rather than on the missile, and feeds an image from the tracking camera which passes through the light from the flares. The chopper generates signals that encode the angle of the missile relative to "up" and the angle out from the centre, or "error off". The simple computer in the base then calculates the control inputs needed to bring the missile into the line of sight and sends them to the missile via the transmitter on the launcher platform, to the small receiver antennas on the rear of the mid-body fins. The operator simply keeps the telescope's crosshairs on the target using the joystick, and the missile automatically flies into the line of sight. The basic concept is similar to that used by most anti-tank missiles, except that those normally use small wires — rather than a radio link — to send guidance information to the missile.

The missile contains a 1.4-kilogram (3.1 lb) warhead with a contact fuze and a single-stage solid-rocket motor that accelerates the missile to about 650 metres per second (2,100 ft/s), about Mach 2. Engagement time to the maximum effective range is about 13 seconds. Response time from initial target detection to missile launch is about six seconds, repeatedly confirmed in live firing.

The whole system and its crew are delivered by two Land Rovers designated the Fire Unit Truck (FUT) and the Detachment Support Vehicle (DSV). Royal Artillery batteries comprised three troops each of four fire units, while RAF Regiment squadrons had eight fire units. By 1980, each Royal Artillery fire unit consisted of a 24-volt, 101 FC 1 tonne Land Rover towing the Rapier Launcher and carrying four missiles on board, a 2.8 m (109 in), 3/4 ton, 24 V FFR (Fitted For Radio) Land Rover towing a 1-ton Missile Supply Trailer (MST) containing up to 10 further missiles. Blindfire radar (see below) was only provided for a third of fire units in British Army service, but for all fire units in the RAF Regiment.

=== Blindfire radar, FSA ===
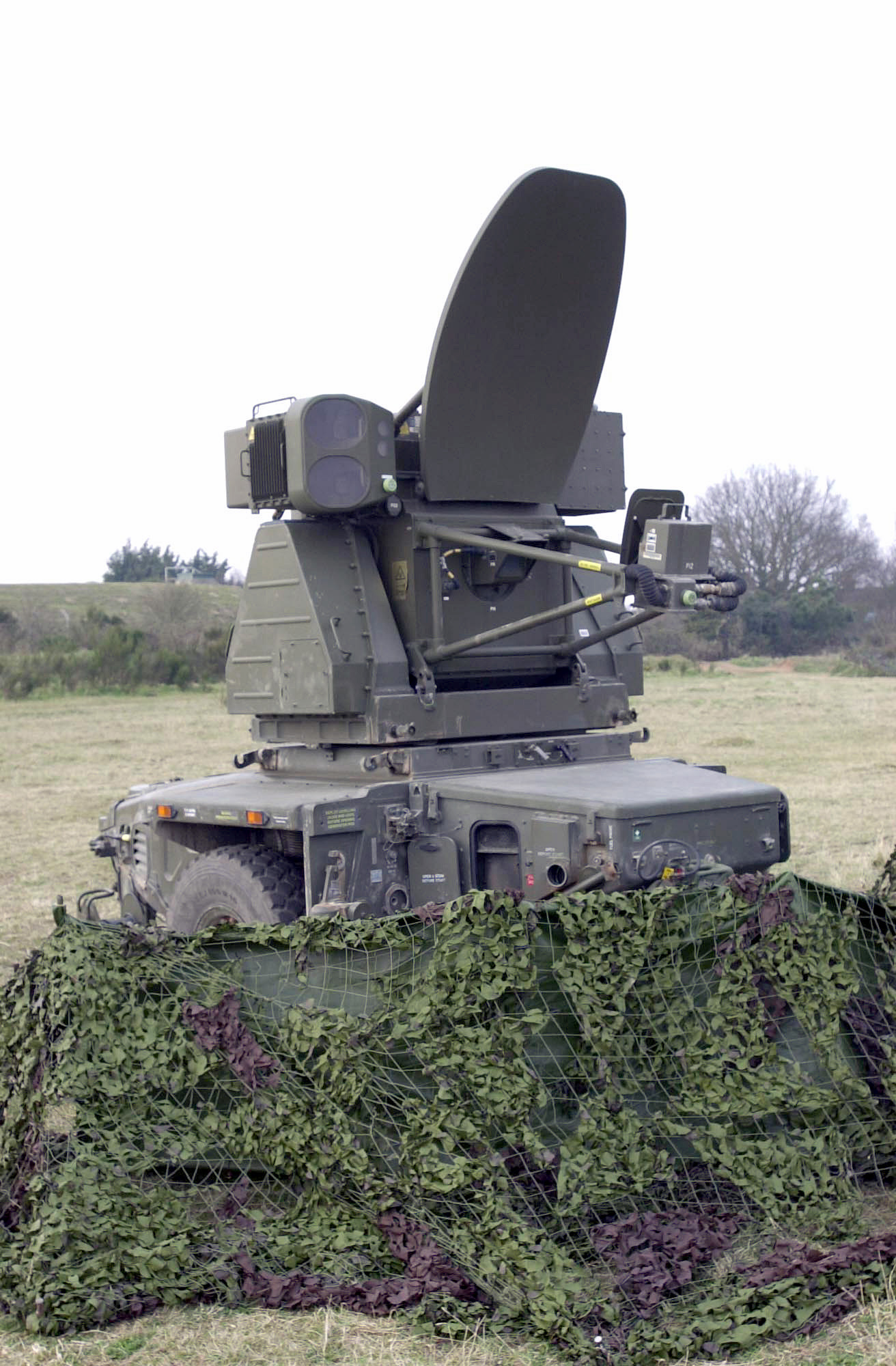
Blindfire radar unit

Although accurate and simple to use, the original Rapier system clearly suffered from a lack of all-weather capability. To address this need, BAC started work on a separate radar guidance unit, primarily to improve foreign sales. This led to the introduction of the Marconi DN 181 "Blindfire" radar in 1970, the first examples being sold to the Iranian Army in 1973.

The British Army did not purchase the Blindfire system until 1979, entering service with Rapier "Field Standard A" (FSA). The RAF Regiment had 27 Squadron operational with Blindfire at RAF Leuchars by 1979, and was in the process of bringing all the RAF Regiment GBAD (Ground Based Air Defence) Squadrons into line. By 1997 more than 350 Blindfire radars had been produced.

To ensure accuracy, Blindfire uses a very narrow "pencil" beam and tracks both the target and missile. To allow the operator to monitor the Blindfire system when it tracks the target, the existing optical tracker follows the Blindfire radar, although it is possible for the optical tracker to be manually "laid on" a second target whilst the Blindfire engages the first. The Blindfire trailer carries its own generator unit, and is towed by a third Land Rover (a 12 V winch-equipped 101 FC) with the designation Tracking Radar Tractor (TRT).

=== Tracked Rapier ===
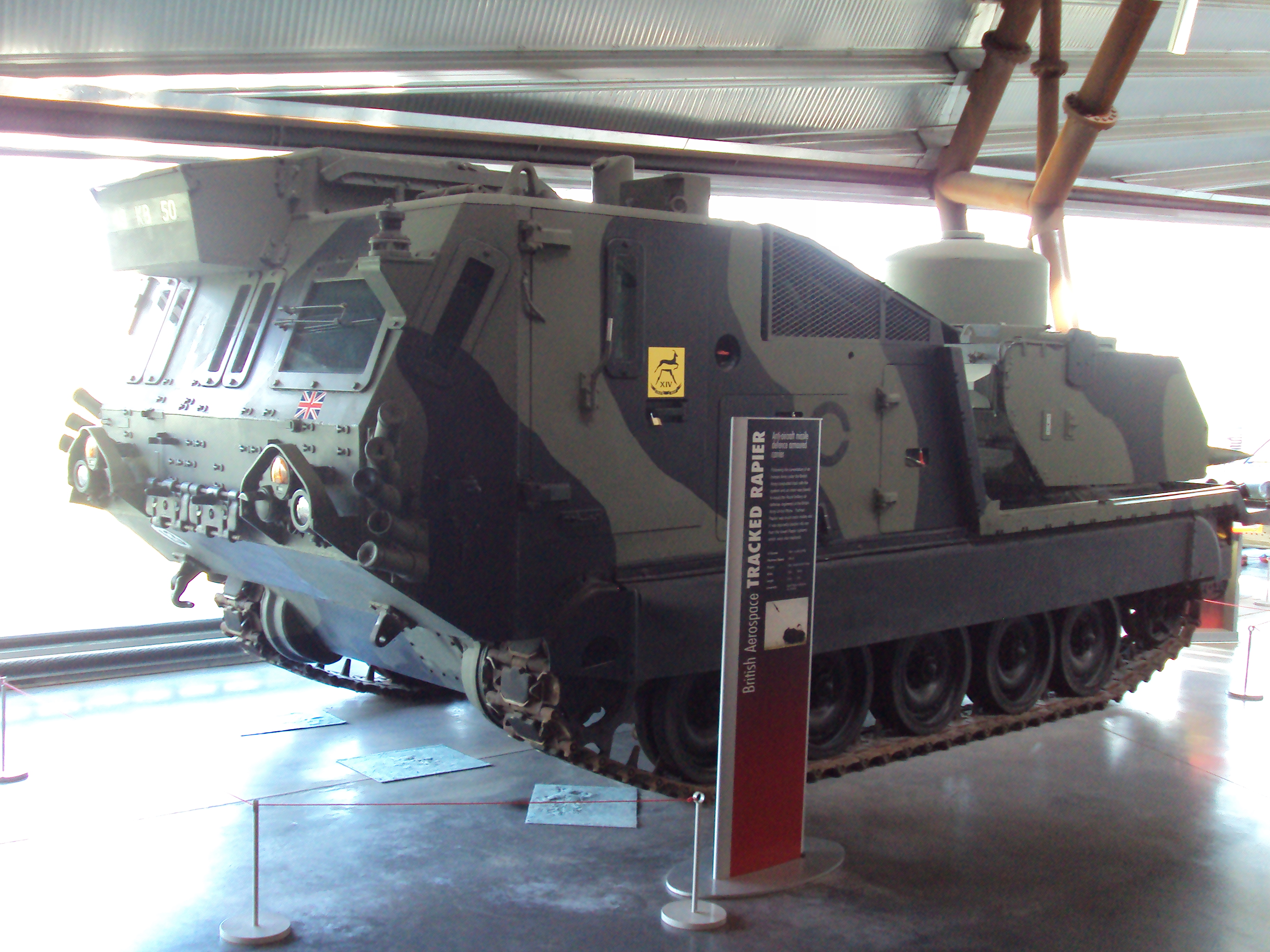
Tracked Rapier at Royal Air Force Museum Midlands

With sales to Iran came the additional requirement for a fully-mobile version of Rapier to protect the Chieftain tanks being supplied on a UK MOD contract. BAC responded by adapting the Rapier system to fit on the M548, a cargo-carrier version of the ubiquitous M113. Development started in 1974 as "Tracked Rapier", with the first public showing at the 1977 Paris Air Show as a static display unit.

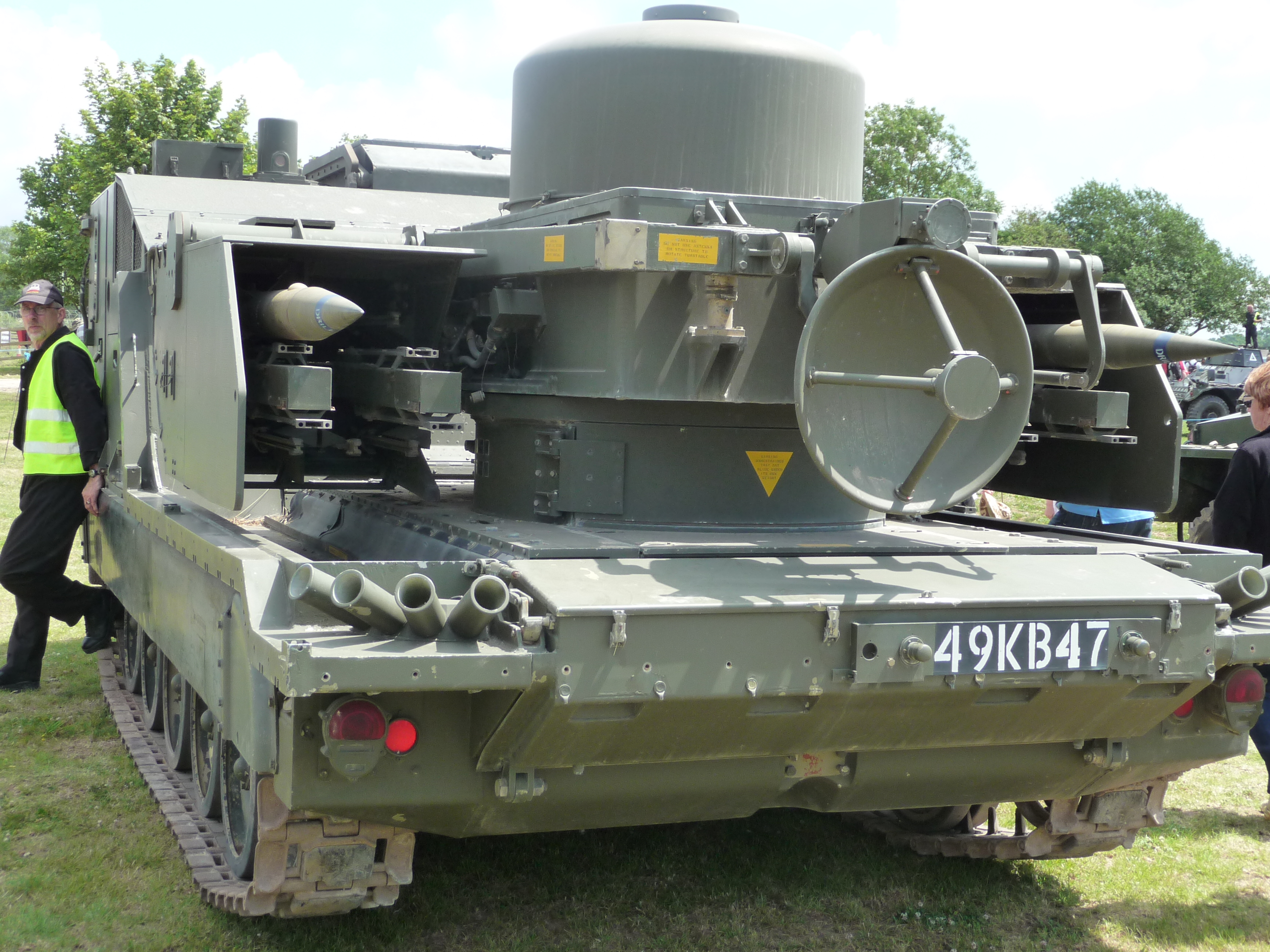
Tracked Rapier (rear view)

The initial proposal for the system was to simply mount the towed launcher, including its petrol generator set but minus its running gear, on the flatbed of the M548 carrier. When this was shown to Mr. G.R. Jefferson, the GW Managing Director, he was not very impressed. Aware of the amount of money available, he required a much more extensive change. Greville Beale and Adrian Pollicutt led the development of a significantly different arrangement which was produced in a short period.

This included significant changes to armour the M548 vehicle, now designated RCM 748, and to incorporate the diesel-powered Coventry Climax H 30 engine to run the new generator set, and also as the auxiliary power unit. The majority of the electronic equipment in the launcher was not changed significantly from the towed version. However, a completely redesigned armoured launcher with the capability of loading eight missiles was produced, mounted via anti-vibration mounts to the flatbed of the vehicle. The armoured cab was provided with pan-climatic heating/cooling and NBC protection.

The optical tracker was placed inside the armoured cab of the vehicle, elevating through the roof for operation. The tracker was operated from the right side of the crew cabin, while on the left were the driver and tactical controller who also had a helmet-mounted sight, allowing him to lay the tracker onto a visual target.

From moving to firing took only 30 seconds, a tremendous improvement over Towed Rapier, which required at least 15 minutes to unlimber, cable-up and align. A further difference between Towed and Tracked Rapier was that the Tracked Rapier launcher had eight (protected) missile rails compared with four in the towed system, enhancing firepower and reducing re-supply requirements. It was also air-portable, ready to deploy on landing, in C-130 aircraft.

There was no room for Blindfire on a single RCM748 vehicle, so this was instead towed or was to be carried on a separate modified M548/RCM748. Feeding data to the control system in the firing unit again required setup time to connect the two pieces of equipment.

The system had not yet been fully developed when the Iranian Shah fell from power in 1978. The vehicles were later purchased by the British Army as part of a Fixed-price Develop and Supply contract. The first production Tracked Rapier was accepted on time and to cost at Wellington Barracks in early 1981, and entered service with 11 (Sphinx) Air Defence Battery, of 22 Air Defence Regiment, Royal Artillery in 1983 in Napier Barracks near Dortmund.

After initially entering service at Towed FSB1 standard, with planar array radar and the 'Pointing Stick', the Tracked Rapiers were upgraded, with the latest version included a thermal-imaging enhanced tracker which enabled single vehicle 24-hour operation without the need for the Blindfire unit.

A modified M548 Missile Resupply Vehicle carried replacement missiles, a relief crew, and additional field kits, rations and water. A further M548 was configured as a REME Forward Area Support team with test facilities and spares.

During the Gulf War, 12 and 16 Regiment Royal Artillery tracked batteries, quickly fitted with sat-nav for desert use, combined to provide Tracked Rapier support to deployed armoured regiments.

Tracked Rapier was retired in the early 1990s, due to manning limitations when the Towed FSC version entered service. It has since been replaced by Starstreak missile launchers mounted on the Alvis Stormer.

=== FSB ===
Shortly after introducing FSA, "Field Standard B" (FSB) added a number of basic upgrades. Additionally, the search radar was upgraded to be easily shut down in case of an anti-radiation missile attack. FSB included lessons from the Falklands campaign, notable the 'pointing stick' that enabled the detachment commander of a fire unit to point the aiming unit at a target.

=== Laserfire ===
With the range of upgrades and new components, the original low-cost Rapier system was gone. In order to address international market requirements for a lower-cost system, BAC started development of the "Rapier Laserfire" in 1982. Laserfire replaced the original optical tracker unit with a new lidar (laser radar) illuminating system that is considerably smaller, allowing the entire system to be mounted on a single pallet that could itself be mounted on a truck or other flatbed vehicle.

Laserfire used a millimetric Doppler radar. Due to its very high frequency of operation and ability to transform its beamshape from narrow azimuth and high elevation to wide azimuth and narrow elevation, Laserfire was able to detect helicopters hovering or travelling at low altitude and in areas of high clutter by detecting the movement of the helicopter's rotor blades.

Initial engagement is similar to the original Rapier, but the target was illuminated and automatically tracked by a high power YAG:Nd laser. After the missile was launched the laser alternately illuminated the target and missile to determine their locations, and guidance was sent to the missile as normal (see laser guidance). Laserfire thus represented a fairly major upgrade to the original optical system, allowing semi-automatic engagements, and greatly reducing operator skill and training requirements.

On the downside, Laserfire no longer has the optical system of the original, which served an important second duty by allowing the aircraft to be visually identified at long range. Additionally, while the Laserfire tracking system was capable of being operated at night, target acquisition was optical, like the original Rapier.

=== Darkfire ===
In 1985 development started on a new tracker that replaced the original optical system with a new IR thermal imager system to improve its abilities, especially at night. This version was known as "Rapier Darkfire" for this reason. Trials of the new system started in 1987, and were deployed operationally in 1990 as "Field Standard B2" (FSB2), the earlier upgrades retroactively becoming FSB1. This system was also known as "Rapier 90". Cooling for the imager was provided by bottles of compressed gas.

FSB2 also introduced a number of improvements that greatly improved Rapier capabilities. First and foremost was the Tactical Control Console that allowed four Rapier launchers to be controlled from a central location. The launchers themselves were upgraded to carry six missiles instead of four, improving battery capacity. Finally, the search radar was updated to use a new planar array radar, although its capabilities remained generally the same as the earlier model.

=== Missile upgrades ===
In 1988 tests started on an improved warhead using a proximity fuze, in order to give Rapier capability against smaller targets that would be difficult to hit directly, notably high-speed remotely piloted vehicles. Serial production of Mk. 1E began in 1989.

In 1992 the Army signed a contract to upgrade all Rapier systems to an enhanced version. A Mark 2 missile variant commenced development in 1986 culminating in a complete re-design which entered service in the mid-1990s. Along with a further upgrade of the proximity fuze, the new missile incorporated (then) state-of-art technologies including:

Von Karman supersonic aerodynamic profile; composite propellant, with a two-stage shaped burn and laminated body solid rocket motor; ceramic substrate surface mount PCBs; completely new electronic systems and software; both analogue and digital proprietary ASICs; highly ECM resistant front end and command link with redundant encoding; fully Digital Autopilot incorporating Kalman state filtering; inertial navigation comprising ring-laser roll and rate gyroscope; Kapton ribbon cabling.

The missile warhead is available in two versions, the Mk. 2A for the normal anti-aircraft role, and the Mk. 2B, which includes a shaped charge warhead and dual fuzes, and which is useful against light armour as well.

=== Rapier 2000 ===
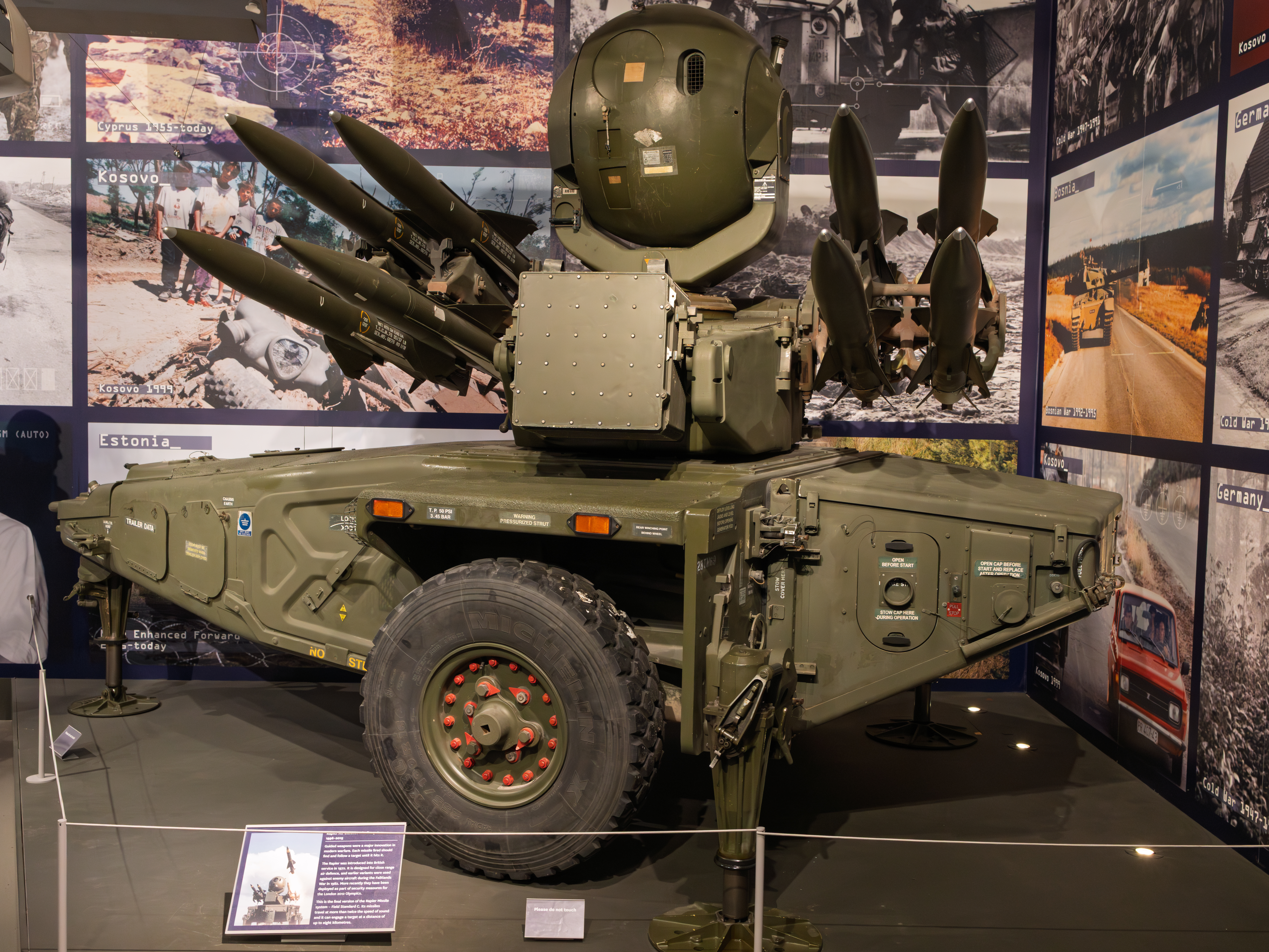
Rapier Field Standard C unit in the National Army Museum, London

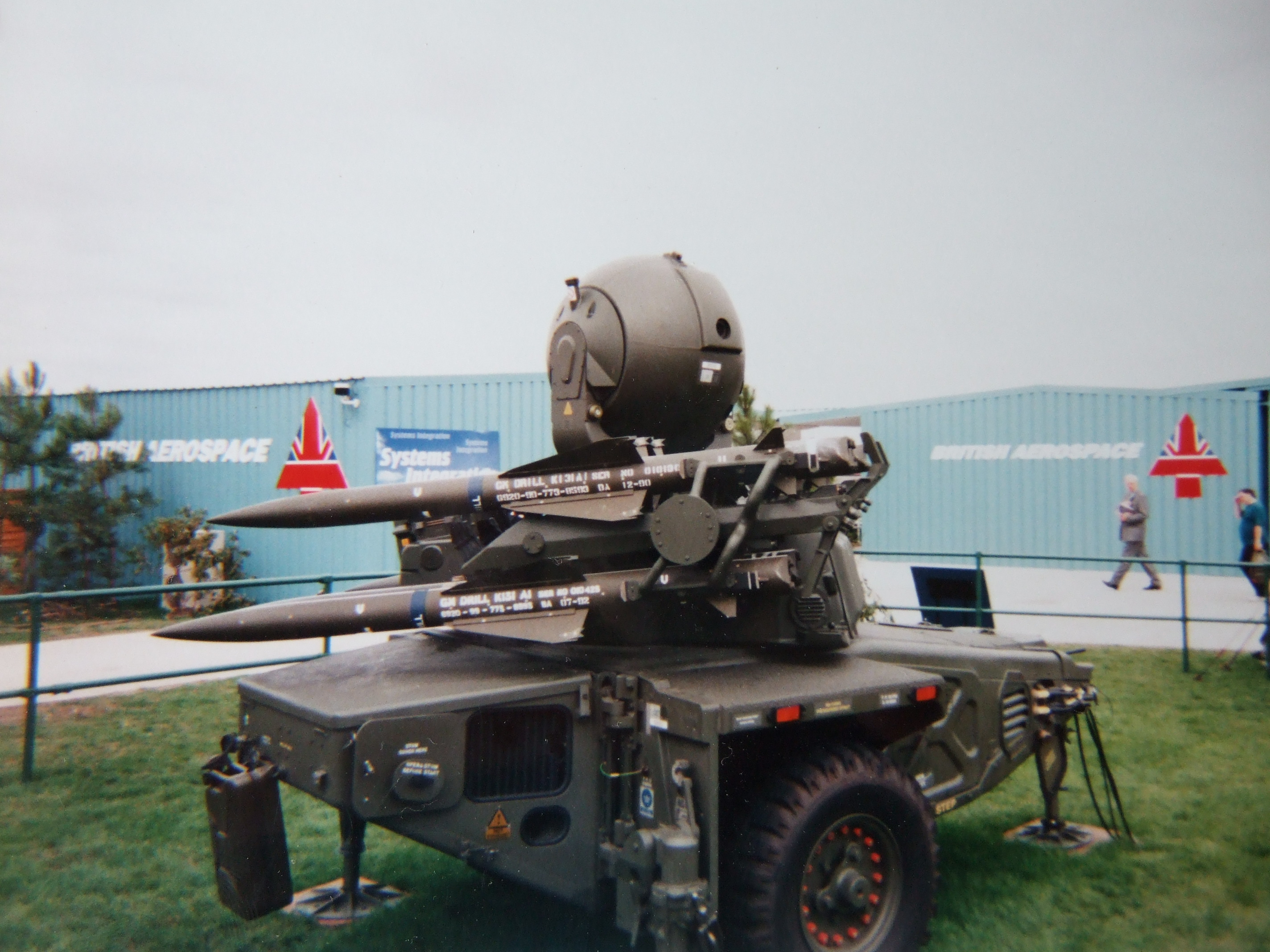
Jernas launcher unit. The optical tracker is on top, there is an integrated generator, and the overall height is greatly reduced.

In 1992, shortly after the introduction of Rapier 90, another major upgrade series started at MBDA (previously Matra BAe Dynamics). Emerging as "Rapier 2000", or "Field Standard C" (FSC) in British service, the system reached its ultimate form. Development of the FSC system began in 1983 and the systems first entered service in 1996. By this time the Cold War was over and British air defence capabilities were significantly reduced, with fewer and smaller batteries, albeit every fire unit with Blindfire. There is also an export version of this version, known as Jernas. Malaysia is the first export customer for Jernas.

FSC was effectively a new system, although Blindfire was little changed and it could fire both Mk 1 and Mk 2 missiles. The Surveillance radar was removed from the launcher and became a separate element and each launcher now carried eight missiles.

With the missiles increasingly relying on radar guidance since the introduction of Blindfire, it made sense to upgrade the original search radar to something much more modern. This was supplied by the Alenia Marconi "Dagger", a 3D pulse doppler radar with an integrated Cossor IFF Mark 10 system. Dagger is mounted on its own trailer, so the radome on top of the launcher unit was no longer needed. In its place, a much more modern optical tracking system was added. The new tracker used a Stirling-cycle cooler instead of compressed gas bottles. The use of much smaller electronics greatly reduced stack height of the whole launcher, allowing an additional two missiles to be added, for a total of eight.

In operation, the Rapier 2000 is similar to earlier Blindfire-equipped systems. Targets are acquired visually or through the Dagger radar, and then the Blindfire and optical tracker are slewed onto the target. The optical system can be used solely to track the missile, or it can be used for all guidance, like the original Rapier. In either case the engagement is entirely automatic, with no operator guidance needed. The optical system can also be used as a search system, seeking out IR sources, allowing radar-quiet operation.

In 2006 a Ministry of Defence study in Ground Based Air Defence recommended further reductions, based on a reduced air threat and the improved air defence capabilities afforded by the Typhoon fighter. These included removing the role from the RAF Regiment as a measure to preserve Royal Artillery units in the face of significant cuts to the Army. Nevertheless, the Royal Artillery units were placed under command of the HQ 1 Group RAF (within HQ Air Command) and the Joint Ground Based Air Defence Headquarters was formed.

== Combat history ==
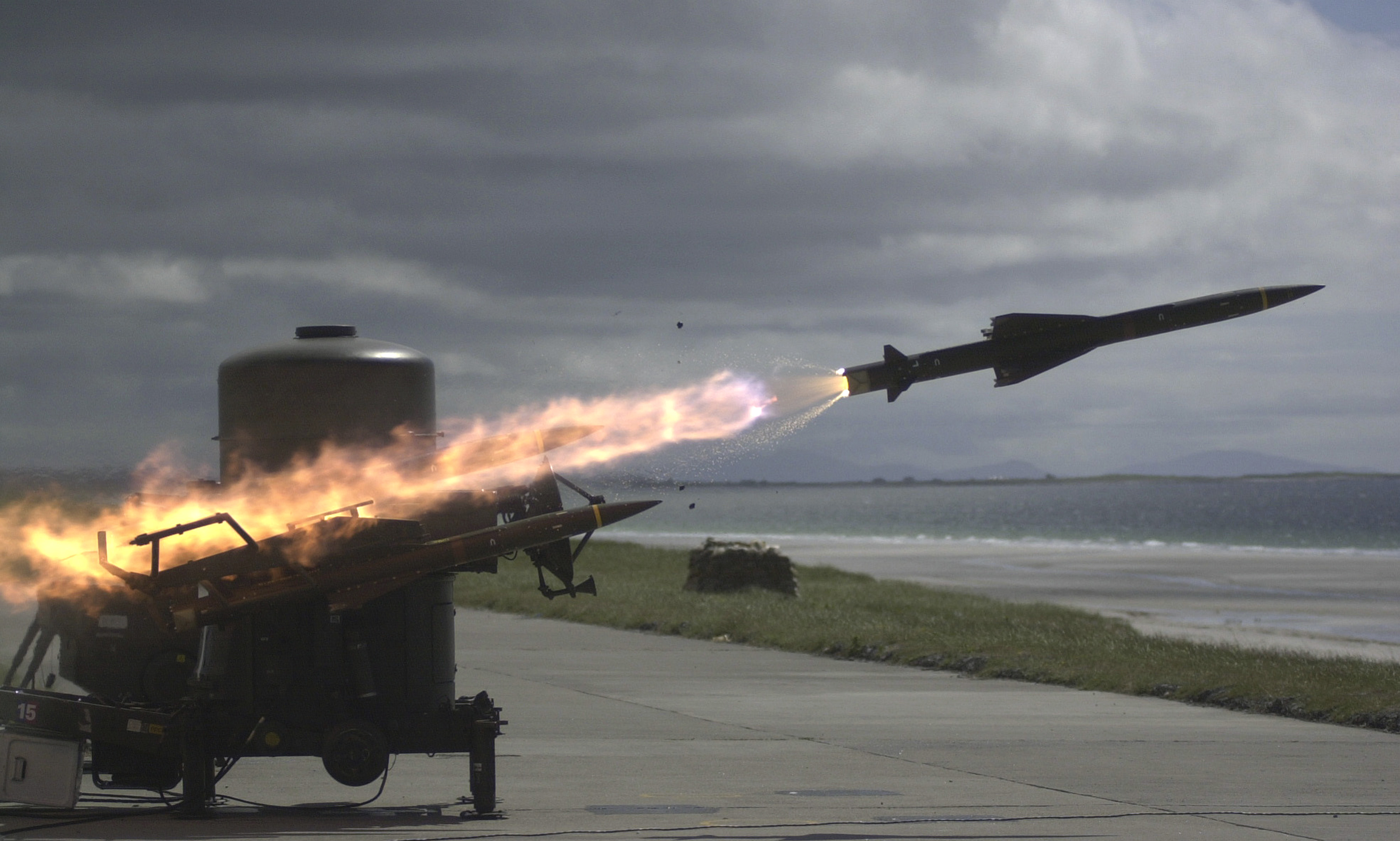
A Rapier missile speeds towards its target during a live firing exercise by 20 Commando Battery Royal Artillery at Benbecula in Scotland.

The first known use of a Rapier in combat was in December 1974 during the Second Iraqi–Kurdish War when it shot down an Ilyushin Il-76MD belonging to the Iraqi Air Force. The missile belonged to the Iranian army, but it was stationed inside Iraq to protect the Kurdish military headquarters. It was fired by a British crew, which seems to have been under contract to either the Iranian government or possibly the missile's manufacturer, BAC. A number of years after the Shah was deposed in 1978, during informal contact with senior members of the Iranian army they indicated to a UK support organisation that they had continued to operate the initial batch of 30 launchers that had been delivered prior to the Shah's removal and that they had intercepted and destroyed a number of invading aircraft, significantly more than were engaged in the Falkland activities.

In April 1982, the original Rapier system was deployed during the Falklands War, when T Battery of the 12th Regiment Royal Artillery joined 3 Commando Brigade as part of the Falklands Task Force. The unit landed at San Carlos on 21 May, tasked with providing air defence cover for a Harrier landing and refuelling pad constructed on the outskirts of Port San Carlos. T Battery's sister unit, 9 (Plassey) Battery, was not deployed to the islands until after the end of hostilities.

63 Squadron RAF Regiment, which had been the first unit equipped with the Rapier system, was deployed to San Carlos Bay on 1 June. It was later repositioned around Stanley.

There were numerous problems that prevented the Rapier system from operating efficiently, limiting its effectiveness in terms of confirmed kills, although it may have served as a deterrent. From an engineering standpoint, the fragile nature of the launchers was already known prior to the conflict, and the situation was worsened by the loss of spare missiles when the MV Atlantic Conveyor was sunk. The unserviceability of Fire Unit 32 Alpha at Fitzroy was one of several factors that contributed to the success of the bombing of RFA Sir Galahad.

Post-war claims credited T Battery with 14 confirmed kills and between four and six probable's.

In reality only one aircraft, a Dagger A of FAA Grupo 6, shot down on 29 May, can be definitively attributed to a Rapier missile. The remaining three; an A-4B Skyhawk of FAA Grupo 5 on 23 May, and two A-4C Skyhawks of FAA Grupo 4 on 24 May and 25 May, were engaged by the full range of San Carlos air defences. Responsibility for those kills has been variously attributed to the Sea Wolf, Sea Cat, Blowpipe and small arms, as well as T Battery.

Similar discrepancies were observed with other weapon systems, notably the Blowpipe missile, which achieved one confirmed kill against nine claimed, and the Sea Cat missile, with between zero and one confirmed kill against eight claimed and two probable kills. The Ministry of Defence was later found to have overstated the capabilities of the Rapier missile system, albeit perhaps unintentionally. This assessment was politically sensitive, as public acknowledgment of Rapier’s limitations risked damaging sales prospects for the system, which was a key revenue generator for British Aerospace’s Dynamic Group.

The main problems were a lack of range, and the decision to omit a proximity fuze, an attribute which required the operator to strike the target aircraft directly with the missile. Rapier also suffered from problems with the IFF system and suffered from interference with Royal Navy radar.

Rapiers were used during the 2012 Summer Olympics to provide air-defence security for the games. Rapier systems were placed at four sites: (Blackheath Common; William Girling Reservoir in Enfield; Oxleas Meadow, Shooter's Hill; and Barn Hill in Epping Forest), with Starstreak missiles at two other sites.

== Operators ==
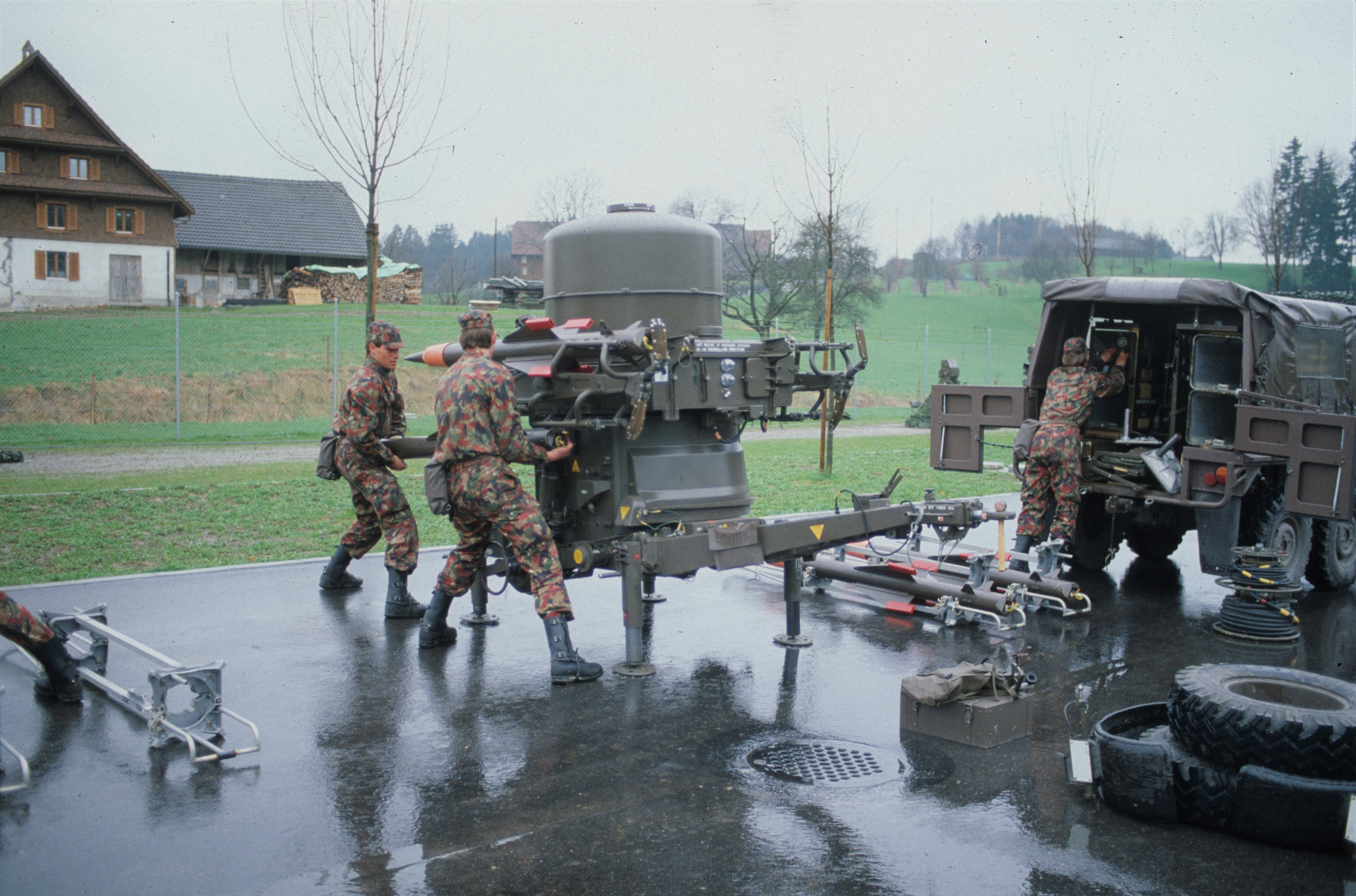
Swiss troops erect the Rapier missile system in 1986.

=== Current operators ===
Iran
Islamic Republic of Iran Army
Kenya
Kenyan Air Force
Malaysia
Malaysian Army – ordered 3 batteries in April 2002
- 3 radars
- 3 dagger
- 15 launchers
- 150 Rapier-2 missiles
Oman
Royal Air Force of Oman – Rapier systems entered service in 1976
- 28 launchers ordered in 1974
- 600 Rapier-1 missiles ordered in 1974
- 12 Blindfire radars ordered in 1980
- 800 Rapier-2 missiles
Switzerland
Swiss Air Force – ordered in 1980
- 60 Blindfire radars
- 60 launchers
- 1,200 Rapier-1 missiles
- 2,000 Rapier-2 missiles
Turkey
Turkish Air Force – 86 launchers, modernized in Turkey. To be replaced by HISAR-A in 2021.
- 12 Blindfire radars ordered in 1983
- 36 launchers ordered in 1983
- 750 Rapier-1 missiles ordered in 1983
- 12 Blindfire radars ordered in 1985
- 36 launchers ordered in 1985
- 750 Rapier-1 missiles ordered in 1985
- 72 rebuilt to standard Rapier-2000 in 1997-2002
- 840 Rapier-2 missiles ordered in 1999
United Arab Emirates
United Arab Emirates Army – Rapier systems ordered in 1974
- 12 launchers
- 250 Rapier-1 missiles
Zambia
Zambian Air Force – Rapier systems ordered in 1971
- 12 launchers
- 250 Rapier-1 missiles

=== Former operators ===
Australia
Australian Army
- 20 SAM systems ordered in 1975
- 570 Rapier-1 missiles ordered in 1975
- (20 purchased second hand from the UK, 'Project Land-140')
Brunei
Royal Brunei Air Force – Rapier systems FSB1 ordered in 1979, latterly operated by No. 233 Squadron (formerly 33 Squadron) at Penanjong Garrison. However, the system was decommissioned in 2010 and the No. 233 Squadron became a supporting to No. 238 Squadron(Equipped with Mistral VSHORAD) whilst prepared for its new air defence system.
- 4 radars Blindfire
- 12 launchers
- 250 Rapier-1 missiles
Indonesia
Indonesian Army – Rapier systems ordered in 1984-1986
- 21 launchers ordered in 1984
- 9 launchers ordered in 1986
- 820 Rapiers-1 missiles (300 in 1984, 400 in 1985, 120 in 1986)
Iran
Imperial Iranian Air Force and Imperial Iranian Army – Rapier systems entered service in 1972
- 45 launchers ordered in 1970
- 36 launchers ordered in 1974
- 1250 Rapiers-1 missiles ordered in 1970
- 950 Rapiers-1 missiles ordered in 1973
Iraq
Iraqi Armed Forces – captured from Iran during the Iran–Iraq War, phased out after 2003
Libya
Libyan Air Force
Qatar
Qatar Armed Forces – Rapier systems entered service in 1983
- 6 Blindfire radars ordered in 1981
- 12 launchers ordered in 1981
- 250 Rapiers-1 missiles ordered in 1981
Singapore
Republic of Singapore Air Force – Rapier systems entered service in 1981, replaced by SPYDER missile system from 2011.
- 6 Blindfire radars ordered in 1981
- 12 launchers ordered in 1981, systems modernised from 1998 to 1999 to the standard Rapier-2000
- 250 Rapiers-1 missiles ordered in 1981, modernised to standard Rapier-2 in 1998-99
United Kingdom
British Army – 124 launchers, operated by the Royal Artillery
United States
The United States ordered 32 Rapier launchers with Blindfire radars in 1981 for air defence of USAFE airbases in the UK. The launchers were operated by the RAF Regiment. A further 14 launchers were ordered in 1985 for protection of USAFE airbases in Turkey.

== Replacement ==
At the DSEI conference in September 2007 it was announced the UK MoD was funding a study by MBDA UK to investigate a replacement for Rapier which was scheduled to leave service about 2020. The Common Anti-Air Modular Missile (CAMM), would share components with the ASRAAM missile in service with the RAF. In July 2021 it was reported that Sky Sabre had started acceptance trials and training with the 7th Air Defence Group of the Royal Artillery. It was planned to deploy the system in the Falkland Islands in "late summer/early autumn".

== Museums ==
Rapier launcher in IWM Duxford

An example is on display under cover in a hangar in IWM Duxford.

Another example is on display at the City of Norwich Aviation Museum.

An FSB standard Launcher, Tracker and S.E.Z. is on display in the Aerospace Bristol museum at Filton Bristol.

A Rapier 2000 is on display at the National Army Museum London

An example of a Rapier system at the Heugh Battery
