= Securicor =

British security consulting company

- Type: Public
- Industry: Security
- Founded: 1935
- Defunct: 2004
- Fate: Merged with Group 4 Falck
- Successor: G4S
- Headquarters: London, England, UK
- Key people: Lord Sharman (chairman)

Securicor plc was one of the United Kingdom's largest security businesses. It was once a constituent of the FTSE 100 Index but merged with Group 4 Falck in 2004.

== History ==
The company was founded by Edward Shortt, a former Liberal Cabinet Minister, in 1935 as Nightwatch Services: its guards rode bicycles and wore old police uniforms. In 1939 it was taken over by Lord Willingdon and Henry Tiarks who developed it into a leading security business. It changed its name to Security Corps in 1951, which was shortened to Securicor in 1953.

In 1960, it was acquired by Associated Hotels which itself dated back to 1923.

In 1984, one of its security guards, John James McWilliams, was murdered while working in London.

Securicor, along with co-founder British Telecom, was involved with the creation of mobile phone operator Cellnet in 1985. Securicor sold its share in the company to British Telecom in 1999, resulting in the formation of BT Cellnet, which was later spun off as O2.

In June 1994, Securicor became responsible for transporting prisoners around London.

In 2004, Securicor merged with Group 4 Falck to become Group 4 Securicor.
