= G4S =

British multinational private security services company

G4S Limited
- Type: Subsidiary
- Industry: Security
- Predecessors: Group 4 Falck; Securicor
- Founded: July 2004
- Headquarters: London, England, UK
- Area served: Worldwide
- Key people: John Connolly (Chairman); Ashley Almanza (CEO)
- Services: Manned security services, cash handling services, justice services and outsourced business processes related to security and safety risks
- Revenue: £7,758 million (2019)
- Operating income: £145 million (2019)
- Net income: £(80) million (2019)
- Number of employees: 533,000 (2021)
- Parent: Allied Universal
- Subsidiaries: G4S Secure Solutions, Hashmira, Argenbright Security, Securicor, Ronco Consulting Corp., AMAG Technology, Wackenhut, Total Security Services
- Website: g4s.com

G4S is a British multinational private security company headquartered in London, England, and a subsidiary of Allied Universal. The company was set up in July 2004 when London-based Securicor amalgamated with Danish firm Group 4 Falck (itself the result of a merger between Group 4 and the former security division of Falck a few years prior).

The company offers a range of services, including the supply of security personnel, monitoring equipment, response units and secure prisoner transportation. G4S also works with governments overseas to deliver security services.

G4S was the world's largest security company measured by revenues before Allied Universal acquired it. It has operations in more than 90 countries. With over 533,000 employees, by 2012 it was the largest European and African private employer.

The company has been criticised and involved in numerous controversies. Formerly a dual-listed company with listings on the Copenhagen and London stock exchanges, G4S was purchased by Allied Universal in April 2021.

== History ==
=== Origins ===
G4S has its origins in a guarding business founded in Copenhagen in 1901 by Marius Hogrefe, originally known as København Frederiksberg Nattevagt ('Copenhagen and Frederiksberg Night Watch') and subsequently renamed Falck.

In 2000, Group 4, a security firm formed in the 1960s, merged with Falck to form Group 4 Falck and by 2000 the company was described as "the world's largest private security systems company". In 2002 Group 4 Falck went on to buy The Wackenhut Corporation in the United States.

=== 2004 to 2010 ===
G4S was formed in July 2004, when Group 4 Falck's security business merged with Securicor to create Group 4 Securicor and began trading on both the Copenhagen and London Stock Exchanges. In 2005, Lars Nørby Johansen was succeeded as chief executive by Nick Buckles and, in 2006, the new G4S brand identity, designed by Russell Johnson of UK design agency Stylus, was rolled out across its business worldwide. In the same year, Alf Duch-Pedersen succeeded Jørgen Philip-Sørensen to become the non-executive chairman of the business.

In 2006, 2007 and 2008, G4S was the subject of a global campaign by union workers alleging that its subsidiaries undermine labour and human rights standards. Some of these groups were organised under the banner of the SEIU-funded Focus on Group 4 Securicor. This group supported protests at Group 4 Securicor's annual general meeting in London in 2005.

The 2006, US State Department Report on Human Rights in Indonesia, released in March 2006, featured the ongoing dispute in Jakarta with Group4/Securicor. In July 2006, the Indonesian Securicor workers had a substantial win – but the campaigners continue to support other Group 4 Securicor workers. The company disputed these claims and pointed to its strong relationships with unions around the world, including the GMB in Britain. In March 2008, it was announced that G4S were taking over Scottish Rock Steady Group – who steward at major sporting and music events mostly in the UK. Rock Steady events have included Live8 concerts in London, Scottish Cup Final and the Download Festival. In April 2008, G4S acquired RONCO Consulting Corporation, one of the world's premier humanitarian and commercial mine action, ordnance disposal and security companies.

In May 2008, G4S acquired ArmorGroup International. GSL, a provider of outsourced justice services, was also acquired by G4S in May 2008. Also, in the same month, G4S acquired Serbian company Progard Securitas. In 2008, G4S also acquired Touchcom, Inc. for US$23 million. Touchcom, Inc. is located in the Burlington/Bedford, Massachusetts, area. The rebranding of Touchcom, Inc. to G4S was completed by 1 January 2012. In December 2008, G4S and UNI Global Union, announced the launch of an Ethical Employment Partnership, which will drive improvements in standards across the global security industry. Simultaneous to this, G4S and the SEIU reached an agreement to end their long dispute and establish a framework to work together in the interest of employees.

In 2009, G4S continued to acquire companies: Secura Monde International and Shiremoor International Engineering, together, the UK's leading specialist banknote and high security technical and commercial advisory companies; All Star International for $60 million, one of the premier facilities management and base operations support companies providing services to the US government; Adesta, US-based provider of integrated security systems and communication systems; and Hill & Associates Consultants Limited, Asia's leading provider of specialist risk-mitigation consulting services. The Västberga helicopter robbery occurred on 23 September 2009 at 05:15 CET when a G4S cash service depot was robbed in Västberga in southern Stockholm, Sweden. In the autumn of 2009, G4S personnel in Australia went on strike, arguing that the company had subjected them to low pay and poor working conditions. The strike imperiled the operations of the court system in the state of Victoria. The guards provided entry-point screening for weapons and bombs in both the County Court and Magistrates Court, as well as additional security in the court rooms themselves.

=== Since 2010 ===
G4S acquired the South African cash in transit company Skycom in September 2010. Then in April 2011, it bought the Cotswold Group, a surveillance and investigations company.

==== Acquisitions of Guidance Monitoring and Chubb ====
In April 2011, G4S acquired Guidance Monitoring, an international designer and manufacturer of electronic monitoring technologies, including hardware and software used for offender monitoring and tracking. In December 2011, G4S acquired the assets of Chubb Emergency Response, a large key holding company in the UK. The deal was finalised on 17 December 2011. The business has now been integrated into their existing key holding and response service.

==== Aborted acquisition of ISS ====
On 17 October 2011, G4S announced it would purchase the Denmark-based facilities management group ISS for £5.2 billion. The acquisition would have created the world's largest facilities management company. Within two weeks, the deal was dropped due to lack of shareholder support. G4S's chief, Nick Buckles, recounted the events of the failed acquisition, which cost the company tens of millions of dollars, as "...one of the most bruising experiences of my life". A combination of institutional investors who led the response and the minority shareholders who followed, objected to a variety of factors, not the least of which was the additional leverage and debt the deal would introduce to G4S's balance sheet. General consensus is that lack of planning for shareholder response on the G4S side doomed the deal. Furthermore, many investors and analysts questioned why the company would want to purchase a firm so far removed from its area of expertise. Alf Duch-Pedersen resigned as G4S chairman after the failure of this acquisition and was replaced by John Connolly.

==== Management and other changes ====
In March 2012, G4S announced that it would sell the "struggling" G4S Government Solutions business (the former Wackenhut (WSI) and All Star business) to exit the US government services. In May 2013, Buckles resigned as chief executive of G4S with £1.2 million payoff and was replaced by Ashley Almanza.

==== Failure to meet London 2012 Security Contract ====
On 12 July 2012, it was announced that 3,500 British troops would be deployed at the 2012 Summer Olympics due to a shortage of adequately trained G4S security staff, with Labour MP Keith Vaz claiming that, "G4S has let the country down and we have literally had to send in the troops". Shares in G4S later dropped nine percent after the firm claimed it faced a possible £50 million loss as a result of failing to provide sufficient trained staff for the 2012 Olympic Games. On 17 July, the company's chief executive, Nick Buckles, appeared before the Home Affairs Select Committee, where he apologised for the organisational failings, expressed regret at having taken on the Olympic security contract, and agreed in principle to pay bonuses to soldiers drafted at the last moment as replacement security staff. Pressed by Labour MP David Winnick, he was forced to admit that organisational situation had become a "humiliating shambles".

In Newcastle, G4S was replaced by 500 staff from local security firms for Olympic events. In Scotland, G4S was stripped of the security role with it passing to Strathclyde Police. At Dorney Lake, the Olympic rowing and canoeing venue, a G4S manager reported G4S radios were not working, so staff were relying on personal mobile phones to communicate; G4S confirmed the venue was being manned by military personnel after 66 percent of rostered G4S staff were failing to show. The venue manager reported parts of the CCTV system had already been replaced by Army patrols and a complete army takeover was "on the cards".

On 22 July 2012, a contractor reported that a third of his expected staff had not turned up; instead, he was sent a group of mainly female, teenage students with minimal training, whom he turned away as he did not feel comfortable leaving them for night duties. On 8 August 2012, G4S announced that it had finally contracted enough employees to fully fulfil its contract for the Olympic games. Although missing its initial target of 10,000, G4S announced the sending of 7,000 personnel each day to Olympic venues, in a way they felt would allow them to fully secure each venue. Subsequent to the Olympics contract failures, the chief constables of Bedfordshire, Cambridgeshire and Hertfordshire were to recommend abandoning outsourcing work to G4S. They were backed by Jim Paice, the agriculture minister and Conservative MP for South East Cambridgeshire. Following the Olympic Games, G4S provided a donation of £2.5 million to military charities as a goodwill gesture.

==== Sale of Wackenhut Pakistan ====
G4S announced in late August 2012 that it would be selling its Pakistan division, Wackenhut Pakistan Limited, to its chairman Ikram Sehgal for a figure of around $10 million, according to the Financial Times. Sehgal disputed this figure, calling it "speculative", according to the Express Tribune.

==== Public Eye Award ====
G4S was one of the nominees for the 2013 Public Eye Award, a counter-event created by NGOs, which awards the worst company of the year.

==== Employee Omar Mateen and Orlando massacre connection ====
G4S was in the news in June 2016 because of employee Omar Mateen, the gunman behind one of the worst mass-shooting incidents in United States history (where 49 were killed), who was employed as a security guard by the company. In October 2006, Mateen had begun working as a recruit for the Florida Department of Corrections, being assigned to the Martin Correctional Institution. In a letter explaining his juvenile record as part of his successful application, Mateen explained the incident of when he was arrested at school when he was fourteen. Following the Virginia Tech shooting in April 2007, Mateen suggested in a corrections officer training class that he would bring a gun to class. P.H. Skipper, who was the warden at institution, wrote that "in light of the tragic events at Virginia Tech officer Mateen's inquiry about bringing a weapon to class is at best extremely disturbing". Days later on 27 April 2007, Mateen "was involuntarily dismissed" from the program and never became a certified corrections officer.

Mateen then worked for British-based security firm G4S Secure Solutions in Jupiter, Florida, from September 2007 until his death. The company said two screenings of Mateen—one conducted upon hiring and the other in 2013—had raised no red flags. Nonetheless, G4S removed Mateen from his job post at a courthouse because of threats he made towards coworkers, including one threat where he claimed he would have al-Qaeda kill a deputy's family. Mateen had claimed that his coworkers and courthouse deputies were making racist comments towards him. Despite this, G4S "kept Mateen as an employee" but moved him "to a kiosk at a gated community in Palm Beach County." They never informed the community or its property management company about why he was transferred there.

Mateen held an active concealed carry permit and an armed security guard licence. He was said to have passed a psychological test and medical exam performed by Dr. Syed Shafeeq Rahman, who had close ties with Mateen's family. It was also noted that Mateen had no criminal record. According to licensing records, he was a proficient shooter who scored in the 98th percentile with a 9mm semiautomatic pistol.

After the shooting, a psychologist, who was said to have evaluated and cleared Mateen for his firearms licence in 2007, according to the records of the security company G4S, denied ever meeting him or having lived in Florida at the time, and said she had stopped her practice in Florida in January 2006. G4S admitted Mateen's form had a "clerical error", and clarified that he had instead been cleared by Rahman, who was from the same firm that bought the wrongly-named doctor's practice. Rahman had not interviewed Mateen, but evaluated the results of a standard test used in the screening he undertook before being hired.

==== Birmingham Prison ====
On 16 December 2016, some 600 prisoners took part in a riot at HM Prison Birmingham, a prison in Birmingham, England, operated by G4S. The disturbance was described as the worst in Britain since the 1990 Strangeways riot. The national chairman of the Prison Officers Association said more than 30 officers at the prison had quit in the weeks before the riot and that further prison convulsions were inevitable.

In a statement to Parliament, Secretary of State for Justice Liz Truss said that insufficient staffing lay at the root of the twelve-hour Birmingham riot and that G4S would have to pay the costs of deploying ten highly trained public sector Tornado elite teams, who were sent to quell the riot. John Thornhill, the president of the independent monitoring board, agreed that insufficient staff had caused rising levels of violence in prisons in England and Wales, leading to "unrestrained violence" and the transfer of a "large number of prisoners ... to other prisons that are already stretched with their own problems and staffing issues."

In August 2018 its contract to run Birmingham Prison was revoked, after Peter Clarke, the Government's Chief Inspector of Prisons reported that it was the worst he had ever visited.

==== Profit margins ====
Ben Saunders, the head of two British immigrant centres that have been the focus of abuse of detainees was put on leave in September 2017. A parliamentary committee chair and the Opposition Labour shadow home secretary complained that G4S's contract with the Home Office limited it to a 6.8% profit on operations, but instead the pre-tax profit margins appear to have ranged from 20% to 30%. Saunders had previously directed the Medway Secure Training Centre where juveniles had been found to have been abused before G4S had divested itself of its youth detention component.

==== Acquisition by Allied Universal ====
In late 2020, the North American companies GardaWorld and Allied Universal made takeover offers for the company. In February 2021 the Allied Universal offer was accepted with G4S delisted from the Copenhagen and London Stock Exchanges. In April 2021, the acquisition was completed.

== Operations ==
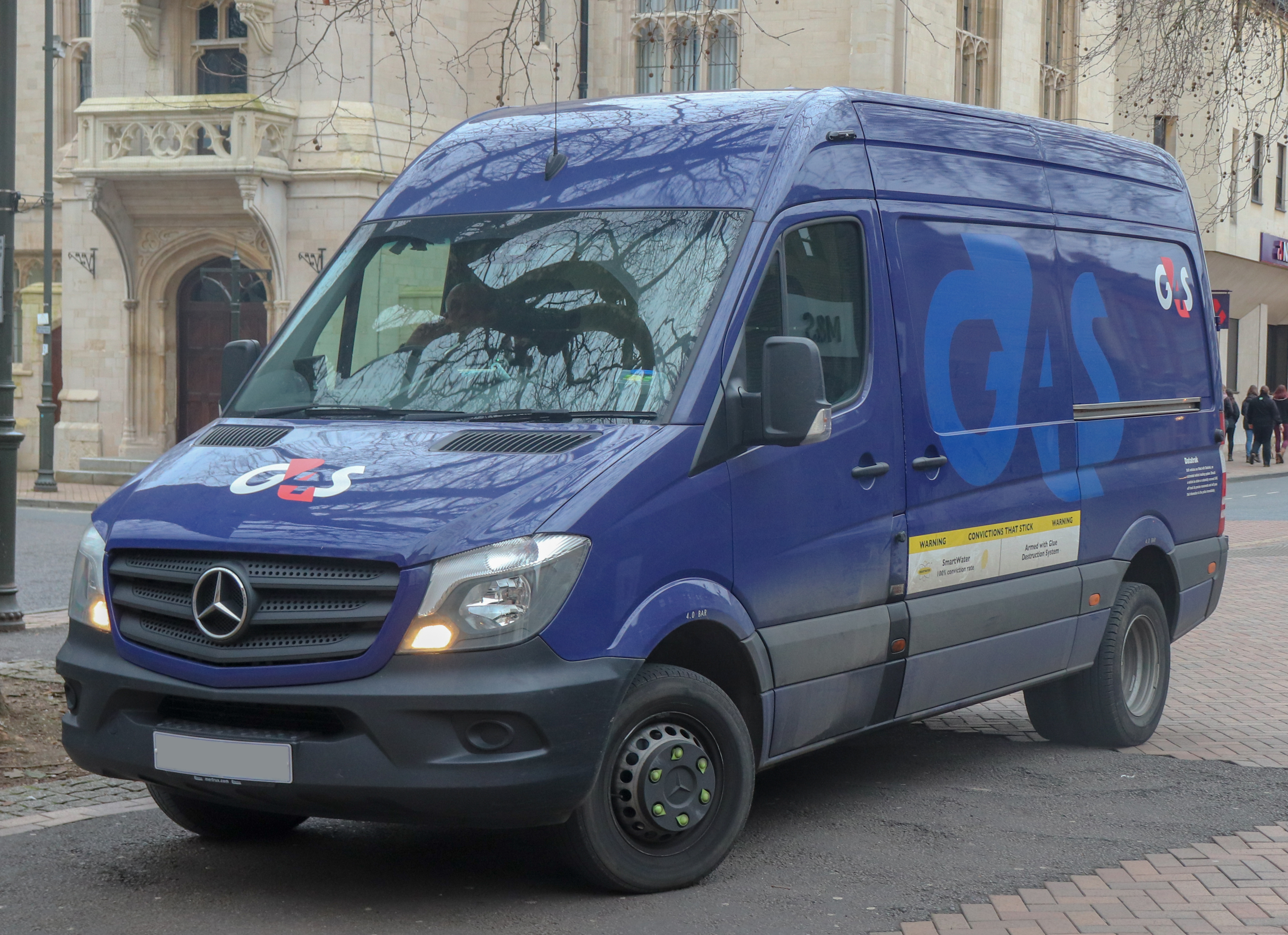
A G4S Mercedes-Benz Sprinter.

=== Activities ===
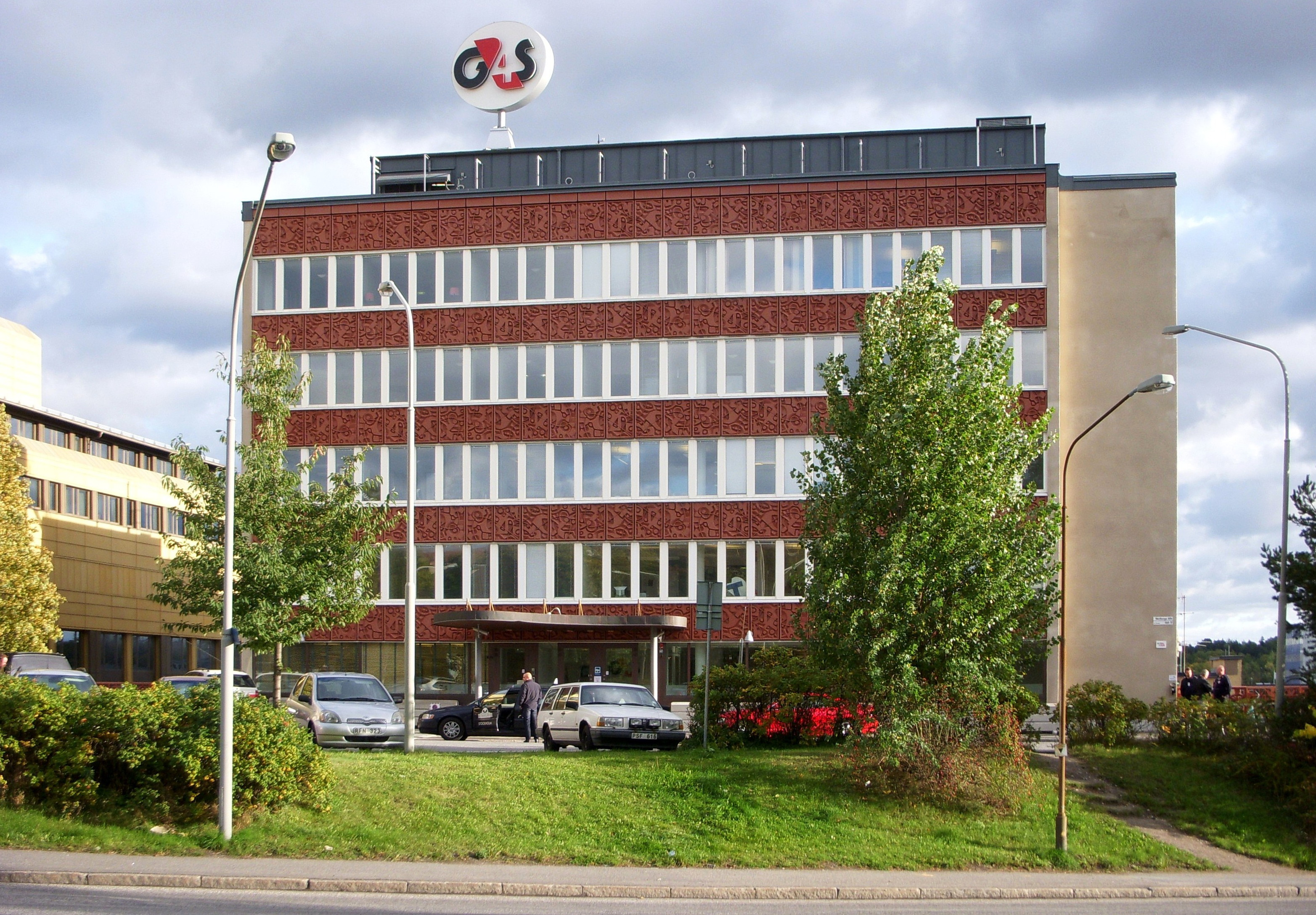
The former G4S offices in Västberga, Stockholm

G4S's core services include 'manned security services' – where it provides trained and screened security officers. The company also provides 'security systems' such as access control, CCTV, intruder alarms, fire detection, video analytics and security and building systems integration technology. 'Monitoring and response services' is another core service, where G4S provides key holding, mobile security patrol and response services and alarm receiving and monitoring facilities. G4S also provides 'secure facilities services' which includes integrated facilities services for entire sites or estates for commercial customers and governments. The business provides 'risk management and consultancy services' which also includes mine detection and clearance services. G4S also provides electronic tagging and monitoring of offenders at home or in the community. The company provides back-office support functions for police forces, support for front-line policing, including the provision of custody suite services and forensic medical services. It also manages juvenile and adult custody centres. This includes the management of all aspects of a facility and those held within the facility – similar centres are also used for the detention of asylum applicants. Prisoner escorting is another core service. G4S transports prisoners and asylum applicants between courts, police stations and custody centres.

In the early 2000s, the company (then still known as Group 4 Falck) bid unsuccessfully for the right to operate several railway franchises in the United Kingdom.

In 2013, G4S Forensic and Medical Services were awarded a three-year contract to run services providing medical examinations and counselling for victims of rape and sexual assault in the West Midlands. It has been working in this area since 2005. The firm provides patient transport services for NHS Trusts including Barking, Havering and Redbridge University Hospitals NHS Trust; Surrey and Sussex Healthcare NHS Trust; St George's Healthcare NHS Trust (£2.7 million a year), and Epsom and St Helier University Hospitals NHS Trust (£3.5 million a year).

In 2014, the Austrian Ministry of the Interior awarded G4S a contract to run a detention center in Vordernberg; this was the first privately operated prison in Austria.

One of G4S' more interesting contracts may be securing the perimeter of Homey Airport, more commonly known as Area 51, the secret United States Air Force base in Nevada. The base is guarded by civilians forces referred to by those who watch the base as Camo Dudes.

As of 2018, G4S operates two private prisons in Australia: Mount Gambier Prison and Port Phillip Prison.

=== Operating structure ===
G4S segments its business into two areas:

- Secure Solutions which includes services for commercial and government organisations in areas such as risk consulting, manned security, and security systems.
- Cash Solutions which is the outsourcing of cash-cycle management for banks, financial institutions and retailers – making up 18 percent of G4S's turnover.

== Corporate social responsibility ==
In 2011, G4S became a signatory to the UN Global Compact, the international standard to promote socially responsible business behaviour including human rights, labour, environment and anti-corruption. In 2013, G4S launched a Human Rights Policy, co-authored by human rights expert Dr Hugo Slim, aiming to align the company's practices with the United Nations Guiding Principles on Business and Human Rights and to introduce additional global guidelines for areas not currently covered by existing standards.

G4S is a founder signatory of the International Code of Conduct for Private Security Service Providers (ICoC), a multi-stakeholder initiative convened by the Swiss government.

== Sponsorships ==
In 2007, G4S began the G4S 4teen, an award-winning program to support 14 young athletes around the world. G4S provided financial, social and logistical support to a number of athletes taking part in London 2012, including Colombian cyclist and 2012 and 2016 Olympic gold medallist Mariana Pajón, Kenyan long-distance runner Pauline Korikwiang, and Estonia's former discus thrower and shot-putter, now-Indianapolis Colts defensive end Margus Hunt.

== Controversies ==
Controversies involving the company have included use of immigrant-detainee labour in prisons, extreme misconduct in child custodial institutions in the UK and the US, allegations of police telephone data manipulation, its troubled nine-year employment of Orlando, Florida terrorist Omar Mateen, the escape of Thabo Bester from Mangaung Prison in South Africa, and the 2016 riot at Birmingham Prison in Birmingham, England.

G4S has also been a target of the Boycott, Divestment, Sanctions movement for its involvement in Israel. In June 2023, it was reported that G4S would be divesting completely from Israel in response to years of campaigning pressure and "reputational damage". G4S' parent company, Allied Universal, was also said to have divested from Israel.
