= Jimmy Dell =

British test pilot

- Born: James Leonard Dell; 23 August 1924; Liverpool, United Kingdom
- Died: 25 March 2008 (aged 83)
- Known for: The BAC TSR-2 test programme
- Aviation career
- Air force: Royal Air Force
- Rank: Wing Commander

Wing Commander James Leonard Dell OBE (23 August 1924 – 25 March 2008) was a British test pilot. He is best remembered for his involvement in the BAC TSR-2 test programme, being one of only three test pilots to fly the aircraft before the project was scrapped in 1965.

James Dell (known as Jimmy Dell) was born in Liverpool in 1924 and joined the Royal Air Force in 1942. After pilot training in Rhodesia he became a flight instructor. Dell remained in the RAF until 1959, retiring with the rank of wing commander, to join English Electric as their deputy chief test pilot.

Dell appeared in a 1962 episode of "Look at Life", in which his work as a test pilot is portrayed.

Dell, along with chief test pilot Roland Beamont, was responsible for the TSR-2 test programme until it was controversially cancelled by the then Labour Government in 1965. Following Beamont's retirement in 1965, Dell became BAC's chief test pilot, and was later involved in the Jaguar and Panavia Tornado projects. He retired as director of flight operations for British Aerospace in 1989.

Jimmy Dell died on 25 March 2008.
