= Martin-Baker Mk.7 =

British ejection seat

Mk.7
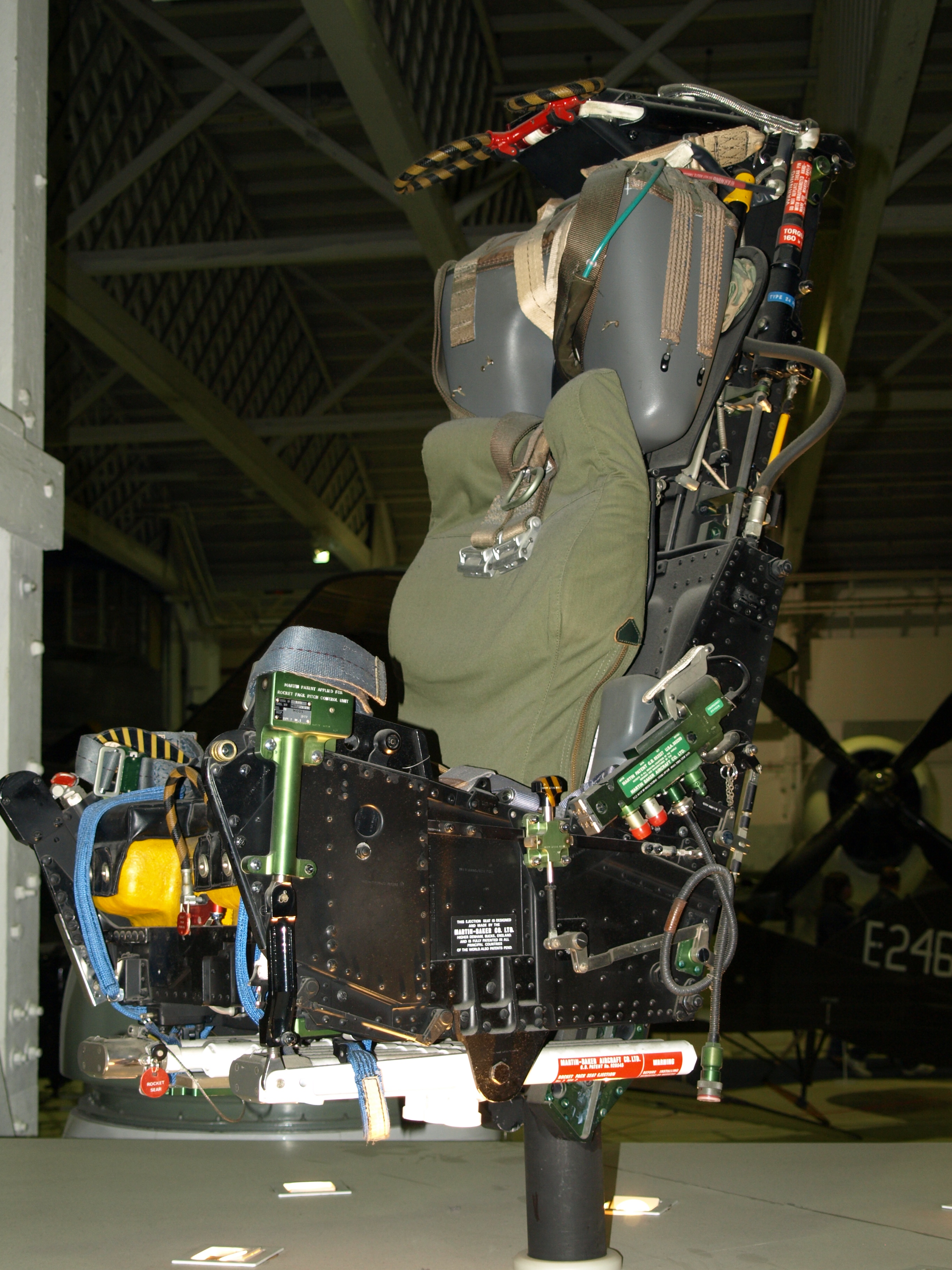
- Martin-Baker Mk.7A on display at the Royal Air Force Museum London

The Martin-Baker Mk.7 is a British rocket-assisted ejection seat designed and built by Martin-Baker. Introduced in the mid-1960s, the Mk.7 has been installed in combat aircraft worldwide.

== History ==
The Mk.7 seat was developed from the earlier Mk.5 design by the addition of a rocket pack to enable zero-zero capability. In late 1967, the German Air Force began a program under Inspector of the Air Force Johannes Steinhoff to replace the seats in Lockheed F-104 Starfighter with the Mk.7. This improved the type's safety record; several other European nations that operated the Starfighter followed Germany's lead. (Note: Belgium and the Netherlands retained original equipment seats.)

== Operation sequence ==
Ejection is triggered by pulling either a seat-pan or face-blind firing handles. This jettisons the canopy, removing an interlock that allows the firing of the main gun: a telescopic tube behind the seat with two explosive charges that fire in sequence. As the seat moves up its guide rails, an emergency oxygen supply is activated, personal equipment tubing and communication leads are disconnected, and leg restraints tighten.

As the seat moves out of the aircraft, the rocket pack is fired by a lanyard attached to the cockpit floor.

A steel rod, known as the drogue gun, is fired and extracts two small parachutes to stabilise the seat's descent. A barostatic mechanism prevents the main parachute from opening above an altitude of 10,000 ft (3,000 m). A time-delay mechanism operates the main parachute below this altitude with another device to prevent the parachute opening at high speed. The seat then separates from the occupant for a normal parachute descent; a manual separation handle is provided should the automatic system fail.

== Applications ==
The Mk.7 ejection seat has been installed in the following aircraft types, either as original equipment or by modification:
List from Martin-Baker.

- EWR VJ 101
- Grumman A-6 Intruder
- Grumman F-9 Cougar
- Grumman F-14 Tomcat
- Lockheed F-104 Starfighter
- McDonnell Douglas F-4 Phantom II
- Northrop F-5
- Northrop Grumman EA-6B Prowler
- Vought F-8 Crusader

== Seats on display ==
A Martin-Baker Mk.7A is on static display at the Royal Air Force Museum London with another Mk.7A at the Royal Air Force Museum Cosford.

== Specifications (Mk.7) ==
- Maximum operating height: 50,000 ft (15,000 m)
- Minimum operating height: Ground level
- Minimum operating speed: Zero
- Maximum operating speed: 600 knots (1,100 km/h; 690 mph) indicated airspeed
