= Tom Smith (engineer) =

British aerospace engineer (1927–2012)

Thomas William Smith (27 March 1927 – 3 October 2012) was a British aerospace engineer, and the team leader of the proposed BAC MUSTARD (Multi-Unit Space Transport And Recovery Device) reusable spacecraft design.

== Early life ==
He was born in Old Clee, Grimsby. He attended the Grimsby Wintringham Boys' Grammar School, since 2007 the Oasis Academy Wintringham. He studied Aeronautical Engineering at Queen Mary College in east London.

== Career ==
After graduation in 1948 he worked for a year for the Gloster Aircraft Company.

=== BAC ===
He joined English Electric in 1949. Working under Sir Frederick Page, he worked on the English Electric Lightning. Later he was one of the leaders of the team that developed the BAC TSR-2, which was cancelled in April 1965. He became Chief of the Aerospace Department at BAC (Preston Division) at Warton.

The MUSTARD hypersonic design had begun life as the English Electric MUSTARD at Warton in Lancashire. It would be powered by LOx (liquid oxygen) and LH2 (liquid hydrogen).

After MUSTARD he worked on the SEPECAT Jaguar and Panavia Tornado, both largely BAC designs.

== Personal life ==
He retired in 1990 and moved to Tetford in East Lindsey. He played table tennis competitively until the age of 50. He married Winifred McCormick in 1948 in Grimsby. They had a daughter and four sons. His wife died in 2000, and he married again in 2000, moving to East Keal. His second wife had died in 2009.
