= Triamese =

The Triamese was a 1965 design for an orbital launch system from General Dynamics. This vehicle was composed of three similar winged vehicles. The fuel of each vehicle was used in sequence to feed all of the motors via a manifold. After the vehicle was empty it separated from the remaining active vehicles and returned to earth for a Horizontal recovery. The final stage held the cargo.

The overall concept was very similar to the 1964 BAC Mustard design and suffered the same fate.

== See also ==
- Douglas Astro
- Boeing X-20 Dyna-Soar
- Rockwell X-30
