= Douglas Astro =

The Douglas Astro was a design concept for a fully reusable space launch system from the Douglas Aircraft Company. It combined two crewed lifting bodies, with only one of them achieving orbit. The system was designed around much existing hardware from the Apollo and other US space programs.

== See also ==
- BAC Mustard
- Triamese
