= BAC Two-Eleven and BAC Three-Eleven =

Proposed airliner

Two-Eleven / Three-Eleven

General information
- Type: Narrow-body/Wide-body airliner
- National origin: United Kingdom
- Manufacturer: British Aircraft Corporation
- Status: Cancelled

History
- Manufactured: 0

The BAC Two-Eleven and BAC Three-Eleven were a pair of proposals for British airliners that were produced by the British Aircraft Corporation (BAC) during the late 1960s. The projects had emerged from design studies which had been aimed at competing first with the Boeing 727-200 and then with the proposed European Airbus.

During the 1960s, BAC, having become interested in the prospects for developing successors to its existing airliners, such as the Vickers VC10, embarked upon a series of studies, initially centring on an enlarged double-decker version of the VC10, commonly referred to as the Super VC10. After this concept failed to gain favour and the British Overseas Airways Corporation (BOAC) selected the American Boeing 747 instead, the company decided to refocus its efforts on a smaller aircraft partially based upon its successful One-Eleven airliner instead. The resulting proposed 191 to 208-seat airliner, known as the Two-Eleven, was viewed as an alternative to the multinational collaborative effort with other European nations to produce an airliner, referred to then as an Airbus. However, the Two-Eleven study ultimately failed to attract much attention within the industry while the British government favoured the co-operative Airbus initiative and thus was shelved in 1968.

Following the British decision to withdraw from the Airbus programme in 1969, BAC quickly revisited its designs for the Two-Eleven and refreshed them to produce an updated proposal, known as the Three-Eleven. It was a wide-body airliner, in a similar class in terms of size, weight, and range, to the original Airbus design. During August 1970, BEA's chairman, Sir Anthony Milward, publicly declared his optimism for the Three-Eleven programme. Spurred on, during November 1969, BAC approached the Ministry of Technology, seeing to acquire financial support for the Three-Eleven programme. However, support was not forthcoming for several reasons, chiefly the foreign policy implications of competing head to head with the Airbus and thus Britain's own European partners, as well as the tendency of previous British airliners to be uncompetitive and to incur higher than predicted development costs. On 2 December 1970, Frederick Corfield, the Minister for Aviation Supply, announced in the House of Commons that there would be no official backing from the government for the Three-Eleven. BAC quietly shelved its plans for the type during the following year.

== Development ==
=== Two-Eleven ===
During the 1960s, there was considered interest in the development of a new generation of airliners to replace those of the first generation, such as the British de Havilland Comet and Bristol Britannia, the French Sud Aviation Caravelle and the American Boeing 707, amongst European aircraft manufacturers. In Britain, the British Aircraft Corporation (BAC) was no exception, showing significant interest in the requirements of both civil and military operators, to which it considered various measures and approaches to respond with.

During 1964, both BAC and its principal domestic rival, Hawker Siddeley, conducted detailed studies on the prospects of producing stretched versions of their existing airliners, the Vickers VC10 and the Hawker Siddeley Trident. In the first half of the following year, BAC submitted its proposals for the production of two separate double-decker versions of the VC10, which was commonly referred to as the Super VC10; however, it was quickly recognised that substantial support from the British government would be required for the initiative to succeed, involving "several tens of millions of pounds". According to aviation author Derek Wood, the enlarged double-decker, which was to be equipped with the proposed Rolls-Royce RB178 turbofan engine, would have had good commercial prospects, yet financing for the programme was not forthcoming, and the British Overseas Airways Corporation (BOAC) ultimately opted to procure the rival Boeing 747 instead.

While the Super VC10 proposal was being studied, other alternatives were also being examined by BAC, BOAC and the British government. The idea of European co-operation had become increasingly palatable from a political standpoint; the British government was keen to pursue some of the joint development opportunities being promoted, including that of a 'European Airbus'. Observing the interest being expressed in the Airbus concept, BAC decided to prepare its own alternative proposals for a similar airliner, this time basing it around the smaller and more successful BAC One-Eleven regional jet.

Accordingly, during 1966, BAC formally issued their latest proposal for a new airliner in the form of the Two-Eleven. It was a 191 to 208-seat airliner, being sized relatively similarly to the existing American Boeing 727-200, while resembling the basic configuration of the future McDonnell Douglas MD-80 in terms of its size and layout. As proposed, the Two-Eleven would have been powered by a pair of the in-development Rolls-Royce RB211 high-bypass turbofan engines, producing 30,000 lb of thrust each. Reportedly, to proceed with development of the Two-Eleven would have required an estimated £50 million. According to Wood, the proposal attracted the support of British European Airways, but not of the British government, which by this time was already favouring the option presented by Airbus and lacked the resources to fund multiple competing efforts at the same time.

BAC sought to improve the Two-Eleven to increase its attractiveness to operators, hoping to garner greater support from the industry. As such, by August 1967, the company was stating the proposed airliner would now be provided with superior airfield performance via the availability of greater thrust, which had been increased by 20 per cent over the initial design. The study ultimately failed to attract much attention; consequently, by 1968, the proposal was shelved with little fanfare.

=== Three-Eleven ===
During 1968, the British government decided to back out of the Airbus venture, citing a belief in its poor prospects in terms of both its economics and market. BAC was speculated to have welcomed such news and seen it as encouraging, not being part of the European Airbus programme (as distinct from rival Hawker Siddeley) and having little airliner work for the future as the One-Eleven project wound down. Perhaps sensing this event as an opportunity, BAC decided to revisit its designs for the Two-Eleven and to extensively refresh them, resulting in its proposal for the Three-Eleven.

The Three-Eleven was publicly introduced at the 1967 and 1969 Paris Air Shows. It was a widebody airliner, in a similar class in terms of size, weight, and range, to the original and somewhat smaller European Airbus which was then in the early stages of development. At the time, the Three-Eleven was widely assumed to have emerged with encouragement from some British government circles and individuals that were close to Rolls-Royce, who were anxious to have a fall-back option in case the European Airbus failed.

As presented in drawings, artists' impressions, models, and a partial timber mock-up, the Three-Eleven, resembled a One-Eleven which had been doubled in size. According to Wood, as proposed, the Three-Eleven was to be furnished with twin RB.211 engines, rated at 43,000 lb of thrust (later raised to 50,000 lb); these would have been mounted near the rear of the airliner, fixed to either side of the tail cone beneath a T-formation empennage. Possessing a take-off weight of 267,000 lb (which was subsequently revised upwards to 302,000 lb), the airliner could accommodate up to 245 passengers seated in an eight abreast configuration at a 34-inch pitch (or up to 300 passengers at a 30-inch pitch). Such a payload could be carried across a distance of at least 1,500 nm.

During November 1969, BAC approached the Ministry of Technology, seeing to acquire financial support for the Three-Eleven programme. In its application, the company claimed that it had an established order book for between 40 and 50 options to procure the tentative airliner, while the development costs were estimated to be £140 million, half of which was being sought from the British government. BAC forecast the Three-Eleven to receive type certification during late 1974. The company had high hopes of receiving support as the Minister of Technology, the Labour politician Tony Benn, was known to be sympathetic toward the Three-Eleven. While the government deliberated on its response to BAC's submission, the company decided to expend £4 million of its own money on the programme in order to continue to refine its proposal.

=== Lack of support and abandonment ===
In order to proceed, the Three-Eleven programme would have required what was commonly termed at the time as "government launch aid." Following its withdrawal from the Airbus venture, the British government was theoretically free to support the Three-Eleven. During 1969 and 1970, the British government-owned airline British European Airways (BEA) expressed willingness to operate the proposed airliner and its preference for the type over the rival Airbus proposal. During August 1970, BEA's chairman, Sir Anthony Milward, publicly declared his optimism for the Three-Eleven, noting that, unless the airliner was ordered, BEA would be forced to spend £180 million procuring foreign-built airliners to satisfy its needs instead.

In addition to BEA, several other airlines declared their support for the Three-Eleven proposal, such as the privately owned Court Line Aviation airline (however, the operator had also declared itself to be equally willing to operate the European Airbus). No orders were placed: the design had not been finalised and the programme itself has not been actually launched. By this stage, the Three-Eleven had become involved in several controversies:

- The foremost controversy addressed the Three-Eleven's technical aspects, with claims that, inherent to the design's aerodynamic properties, it would be prone to encountered the deep stall phenomenon, along with other unfavourable conditions, such as loadability and centre of gravity issues when used in real-life airline service, as well as there being a high likelihood of the type being overweight. It was suggested that the aeroplane would make a poor freight and mixed passenger/freight carrier due to configurational shortcomings. (Indeed, the layout failed to make its way into production on any widebody aircraft, the Ilyushin Il-86 project reverting to a conventional layout before it reached the hardware stage.);
- Another controversy addressed Britain's foreign policy and was double-sided. On the one hand, in nascent complaints at European governments' finance for aircraft which competed with American products, private US aircraft makers cautioned that such support may ultimately impact trade and political relations across the Atlantic. On the other, Britain's potential Common Market partners warned that since the Three-Eleven project would directly compete against the European Airbus, around which they had largely coalesced; according, to proceed with the programme effectively threw doubt over British loyalty to the EEC which, at this point, the British government had submitted an application to become a member of.
- A third controversy addressed the British government's backing for its aviation industry. Specifically, there were concerned claims that several of the airliner projects which had been sponsored by the government had tended to be uncompetitive, furthermore, in some cases, the aircraft had been unwanted by the airlines whose needs they purported to meet. In particular, it was claimed that Vickers VC10 and Trident experience showed that initial finance was understated deliberately so as to entice backing from the government, which would effective lock it into providing further support later as and when the need for additional financing became apparent. Specifically, rival Hawker Siddeley had publicly scorned BAC's development cost figures for the Three-Eleven, rubbishing them as have been understated and making its own suggestions of much higher figures to be likely.

Considerations of these multiple issues were a factor in the delaying of any government launch aid. Since a general election was approaching, the Labour cabinet of Harold Wilson had decided to halt any progress on the issue until a new government with a fresh mandate had been elected to power. The election resulted in a Conservative government. As opposed to Labour, this party was enthusiastically intent on taking Britain into the EEC; the party was also ideologically opposed to state intervention in industry. In short order, however, the new Edward Heath cabinet had to involve itself in such an intervention in order to rescue Rolls-Royce from bankruptcy, resulting in the firm's nationalising. Since launch aid for the Three-Eleven would have been a further very significant instance of state intervention, and would also have given an anti-EEC signal, it was quietly omitted from the political agenda.

By that time, the Airbus A300 design had been finalised and had attracted modest but sufficient orders, while the first A300 aeroplane was progressing to completion. There was also growing pressure from the Heath government for BEA and private British airlines (particularly Court Line) to buy another airliner, the American Lockheed L-1011 TriStar: since TriStars were powered by Rolls-Royce engines, this would help recovery in a sector of the British aviation industry which had recently attracted large state support. Wood speculated that, if the British government had provided financial backing for the Three-Eleven, the consequent investment by BAC in Rolls-Royce via the RB.211 engine would have been a considerable boon to the ailing firm, and might have averted Rolls-Royce's bankruptcy entirely, but he also notes that this is conjecture on his own part.

On 2 December 1970, Frederick Corfield, the Minister for Aviation Supply, announced in the House of Commons that there would be no official backing from the government for the Three-Eleven programme. This was effectively the death knell for the initiative, as other parties that might have been interested were dissuaded by the government's decision to turn its back on the Three-Eleven. In the circumstances, few sales could be foreseen for the Three-Eleven. Simultaneously, it was also apparent that no commercial sources were likely to fund its development. By 1971, BAC had decided to quietly abandon the Three-Eleven venture.

== See also ==
Related development

- BAC One-Eleven

Aircraft of comparable role, configuration, and era

- Airbus A300
- Lockheed L-1011 TriStar
- McDonnell Douglas DC-10

Related lists

- List of civil aircraft
