= Roland Beamont =

British fighter pilot

Roland Prosper Beamont
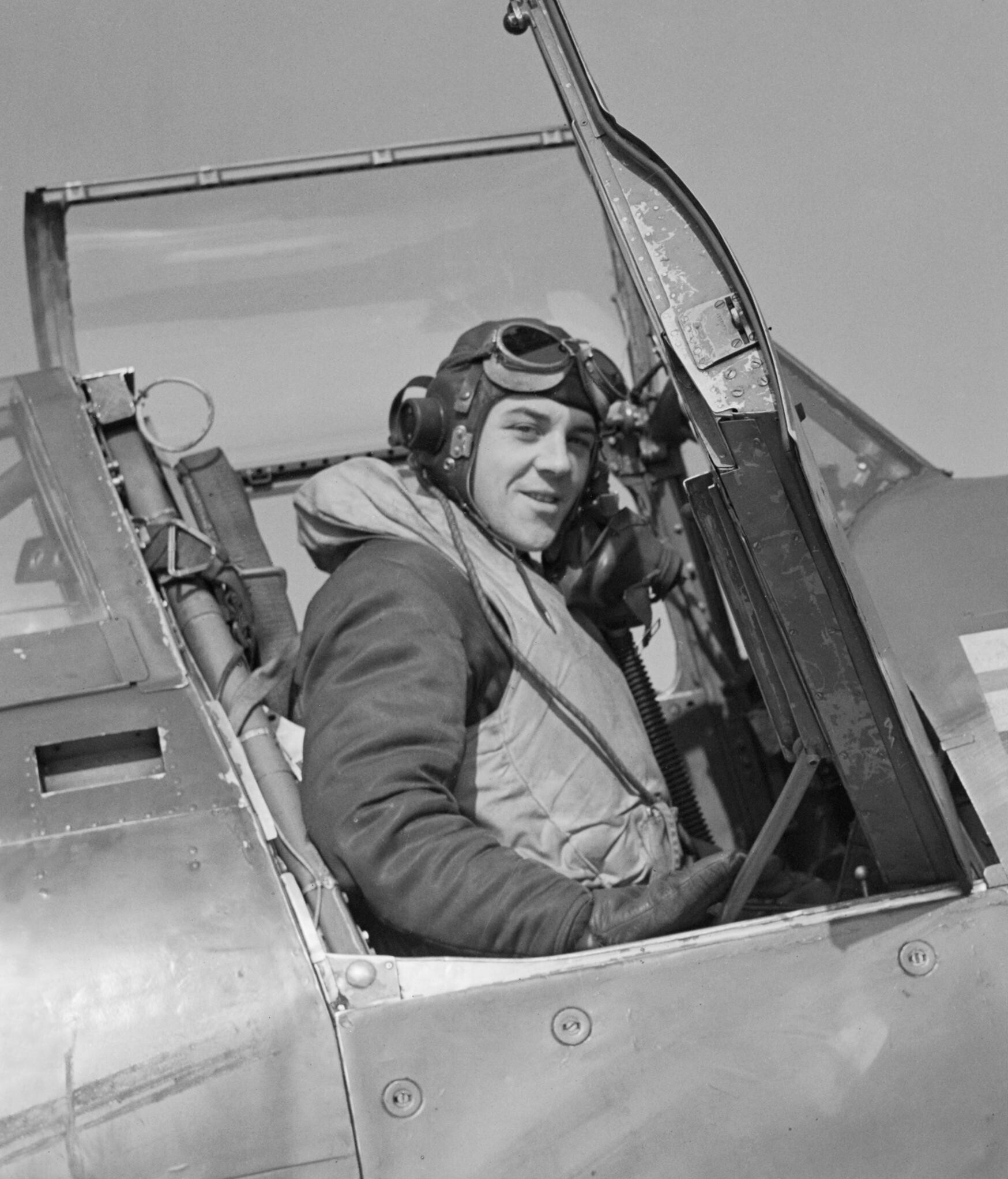
- Squadron Leader R P Beamont of No. 609 Squadron RAF, in his Hawker Typhoon Mark IB
- Born: 10 August 1920; Enfield, Middlesex
- Died: 19 November 2001 (aged 81); Hampshire
- Military career
- Allegiance: United Kingdom
- Branch: Royal Air Force
- Service years: 1939–1979
- Rank: Wing commander
- Nickname: Bee
- Units: No. 87 Squadron RAF; No. 79 Squadron RAF; No. 150 Wing RAF
- Commands: No. 609 Squadron RAF (1942–43)
- Conflicts: Second World War: Battle of France; Battle of Britain
- Awards: Commander of the Order of the British Empire; Distinguished Service Order & Bar; Distinguished Flying Cross & Bar; Distinguished Flying Cross (United States); Croix de guerre (Belgium)
- Other work: Test pilot Author

Wing Commander Roland Prosper "Bee" Beamont, CBE, DSO & Bar, DFC & Bar (10 August 1920 – 19 November 2001) was a British fighter pilot for the Royal Air Force (RAF) and an experimental test pilot during and after the Second World War. He was the first British pilot to exceed Mach 1 in a British aircraft in level flight (P.1A), (Note: John Derry was the first British Pilot to exceed Mach 1 but did so in a shallow dive in the de Havilland DH 108) and the first to fly a British aircraft at Mach 2 (P.1B).

During the Second World War, he flew more than five hundred operational sorties. He also spent several months as a Hawker Aircraft experimental test pilot developing the Hawker Typhoon and Tempest, and was responsible for introducing these types into operational squadron service. He pioneered the ground attack capabilities of the Typhoon and led the air-to-air campaign against the V-1 flying bomb.

In 1945 he commanded the Air Fighting Development Squadron at RAF Central Fighter Establishment, before leaving the service in 1947. During his subsequent career as English Electric Aviation chief test pilot (and later for BAC), he directed the flight test programmes of the Canberra, the Lightning and TSR-2, making the maiden flight of each type.

When he retired from test flying in 1968, he had flown 167 different types during a total of 5,100hr and 8,000 flights—of which more than 1,100 were supersonic. He set three Atlantic records in the Canberra, including the first double Atlantic flight within 24 hours for which he was awarded the Britannia Trophy. In 1971, he became Panavia flight operations director, responsible for the testing of the Tornado, retiring in August 1979 following the maiden flight of the first production Tornado. After retirement he contributed to aviation journals and wrote a number of books about his experiences.

During Beaumont’s aviation career, he never crashed an aircraft, bailed out, or ejected. One example was when his Hawker Tempest was shot down and he successfully force landed the aircraft and avoided any serious injury.

== Early life ==
Roland Prosper Beamont was born on 10 August 1920 at 8 Private Road, Enfield, Middlesex, the son of Lieutenant Colonel Ernest Clement Beamont, a trade officer with the Foreign Office, and Dorothy Mary, née Haynes. He grew up in Chichester, Sussex, and from an early age was fascinated by aviation. His first flight was in 1926; a barnstormer in an Avro 504 landed near his home and took Beamont (aged 6) and his father up for 5 Shillings. Thereafter, Beamont saved all his pocket money to spend it on flying books and model aeroplanes His second fight was in 1932 in a Fox Moth piloted by C.W.A. Scott.

He spent his school holidays, cycling to nearby RAF Tangmere to watch the RAF Hawker Furies fly. His parents supported his interest in aviation and had him educated at Eastbourne College from 1934 to 1937 with the aim of admission into the RAF College Cranwell In addition, his father organised two air experience flights (under the RAF's schools assistance scheme) the first at Tangmere, with No. 1 Squadron, the second at RAF Halton in which Beamont (aged 16) was allowed to take the controls in an Avro Tutor.

Beamont was not academic and failed his school certificate in 1938. He retook it after private tuition, and scraped enough passes to apply for a short service commission. On 2 September 1939 he reported to No. 13 Elementary and Reserve Training School at White Waltham Airfield for ab initio flying training as a civilian. His subsequent commission was dependent on passing the course (i.e. going solo after 15 hours tuition), which he only just managed. He was posted to No. 13 Advanced Flying Training School, Drem, flying Hawker Harts and then Hurricanes. He passed out as a pilot officer, graded exceptional, on 21 October, and in November 1939, he was sent to France to join No. 87 Squadron.

== RAF career ==
=== Hurricane ===
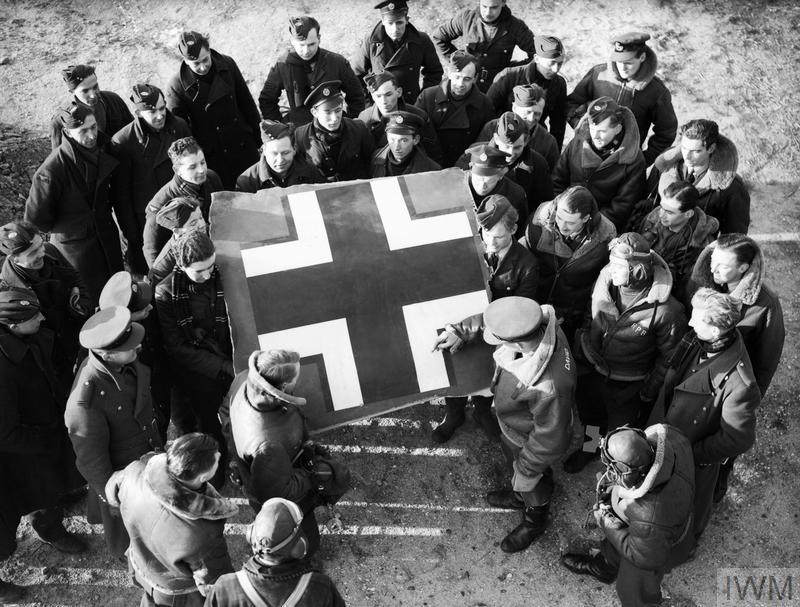
Pilots and ground crew gather around the fuselage Balkenkreuz from No 87 Squadron's first kill, a Heinkel He 111 on 2 November 1939. Watching on the right is Pilot Officer Roland Beamont (in flying helmet, with initials on his flying jacket)

Beamont arrived at British Expeditionary Force (BEF) in France with 15 hours experience flying Hurricanes. During the winter of 1939, there was little opportunity for the inexperienced pilots to fly and Beamont was assigned to the operations room. As a result of a high fever, he was sent to a hospital in Dieppe, but after two weeks absence he risked being removed from squadron strength and put into the pilots pool. To avoid this, he persuaded his father, who was also stationed in France, to provide a car to drive him back to the squadron. The spring of 1940 provided more opportunity for action. In March he took part in an interception of a Heinkel He 111 bomber, on 8 May he shot down a Dornier Do 17.

When No. 87 Squadron returned from France they were initially stationed at RAF Church Fenton, before relocating to RAF Exeter, as part of 10 Group, defending South Western England. During the Battle of Britain, Beamont claimed a Junkers Ju 88 on 24 July, two Messerschmitt Bf 110 on 15 August, a Dornier Do 17 and a Messerschmitt Bf 109 on 25 August.

Beamont described the period:

...I used to fly often to Portsmouth and look down upon my home, where my family was, in Chichester. Tangmere was being bombed ten miles away. It was all a very personal thing. When you got into your aeroplane, you felt the fears that everybody fears when going off to fight but overpowering all that was this feeling that if you and all your chaps didn't do your damnedest on every operation then all these Germans were going to be flooding over your country, your homes and destroying everything that was worth preserving. That was what it was all about.

During the air raids of The Blitz, No. 87 Squadron was assigned night fighter duties defending Bristol. Directing the Hurricanes by searchlight was largely ineffective. In frustration, Beamont suggested that on moonlit nights they should cross the channel and strafe the Luftwaffe aerodromes. This tactic was adopted by Group and proved successful, with Beamont taking part in the destruction of several aircraft.

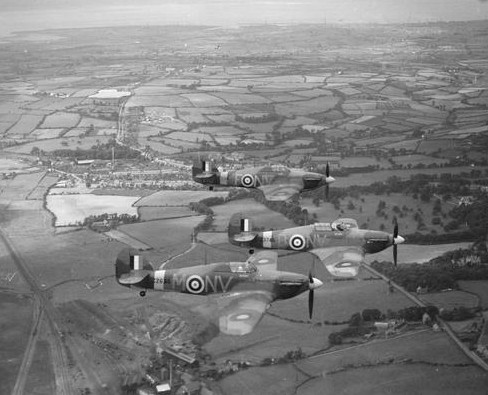
Three Hawker Hurricane Mark IIBs of No. 79 Squadron RAF. The pilots were, Sqn Ldr G D Haysom (NV-B), Flt Lt R P Beamont (nearest aircraft,'NV-M'), and Flt Lt L T Bryant-Fenn (NV-F).

In May 1941 he was transferred to No. 79 Squadron RAF as flight commander, and in June he was awarded the Distinguished Flying Cross. Beamont set about raising the morale of his new flight by engaging them in night flying and formation aerobatics. In September he transported a Women's Auxiliary Air Force (WAAF) cipher officer to a dance at RAF Pembrey in his single-seat Hurricane because the squadron's de Havilland Tiger Moth was unavailable. This action would lead to his court martial in December 1941 (and his marriage in October 1942). The court found him guilty and he was severely reprimanded by Group Captain Richard Atcherley.

When his tour of duty ended in December 1941, he was offered the position of Leigh-Mallory's personal aide. Instead, he chose to keep flying and to accept a position as a production test pilot at Hawker's. While he had 800 hours flying Hurricanes he was by his own admission, ignorant of the problems of aircraft stability, trim and control balance. To remedy this, Hawker's civilian test pilots, Bill Humble, Hubert Broad and particularly Philip Lucas mentored him in the art and science of test flying.

At Hawker's, while most of his flying was production test flights of Hurricanes, he did take part in some of the development flying of the early production Typhoons. On his first cross country flight in a Typhoon, while delivering it to Gloster's, (Note: Typhoon production was to be by Gloster, a company within the Hawker Siddeley group) its main oil pipe failed. He managed an emergency landing in a small field being used as a flying school, attracting a rebuke from the chief flying instructor. In February 1942 he took over the vibration programme of the Typhoon, flying aircraft fitted with vibrographs to determine the effectiveness of propeller balancing improvements and the sprung seat mounts· (Note: The engineering work to reduce cockpit vibration in the Typhoon was led by Frederick Page, who would later lead the Lightning and TSR2 development)

=== Typhoon ===
Beamont was keen to resume operational flying in one of the two Typhoon squadrons. He was initially posted to No. 56 Squadron, as a supernumerary flight commander in July 1942, followed by a permanent posting to No. 609 Squadron RAF in October. When its commanding officer Paul Richey left in January 1943, Beamont was promoted to squadron leader.

Fighter Command had concerns about the Typhoon's safety and serviceability because during the first nine months of its introduction, the losses due to structural and engine failure were greater than caused by enemy action. As commanding officer of the few Typhoon squadrons, Beamont was instrumental in arguing for keeping the aircraft in RAF service against increasing establishment resistance. He was called to meetings with Air Chief Marshal Trafford Leigh Mallory and AOC Hugh Saunders to discuss the future of the Typhoon. Beamont argued that he had faith in the manufacturers to correct its faults and that the basic design of the aircraft was sound: it was easy to fly, a stable firing platform, it was both faster and more manoeuvrable than contemporary Luftwaffe fighters. Leigh Mallory was in agreement and the Typhoon was saved. However, it was Beamont and his squadron's actions over the winter of 1942/43 that would start to establish the Typhoon's reputation.

From March 1942 the Southern coast of England had been under attack from Luftwaffe fighter bombers. No 609 squadron was relocated to RAF Manston and in November standing patrols were set up from dawn till dusk to intercept raiding Focke-Wulf Fw 190 fighter bombers (Jagdbombers). At the same time Beamont was developing the use of the Typhoon as a night intruder. To repeat his earlier initiative with the Hurricane, he had the illumination of his displays and reflector sight modified to be compatible with night flying. Starting on the night of 17 November, he flew a series of solo sorties; attacking trains on the Calais-Amiens-Paris line to demonstrate that the Typhoon was both safe to fly at night and an effective ground attack aircraft.

No. 91 Squadron's Spitfire XII were also deployed to intercept the raiders. Inevitably, amid inter-squadron rivalry, the question of the fastest fighter arose. Beamont challenged the CO of No. 91 Squadron to an air race, with Beamont's Typhoon being the clear victor over the Spitfire XII. (Note: In a speed trial, held at Farnborough in July 1942, the Griffon-engined Spifire Mk XII prototype (DP845) piloted by Jeffrey Quill was demonstrated to be faster than a contemporary Hawker Typhoon and a captured Focke-Wulf Fw 190.)

He was awarded a bar to his DSO in June 1943, his destruction of 13 trains and numerous lorries being noted.

=== Tempest ===
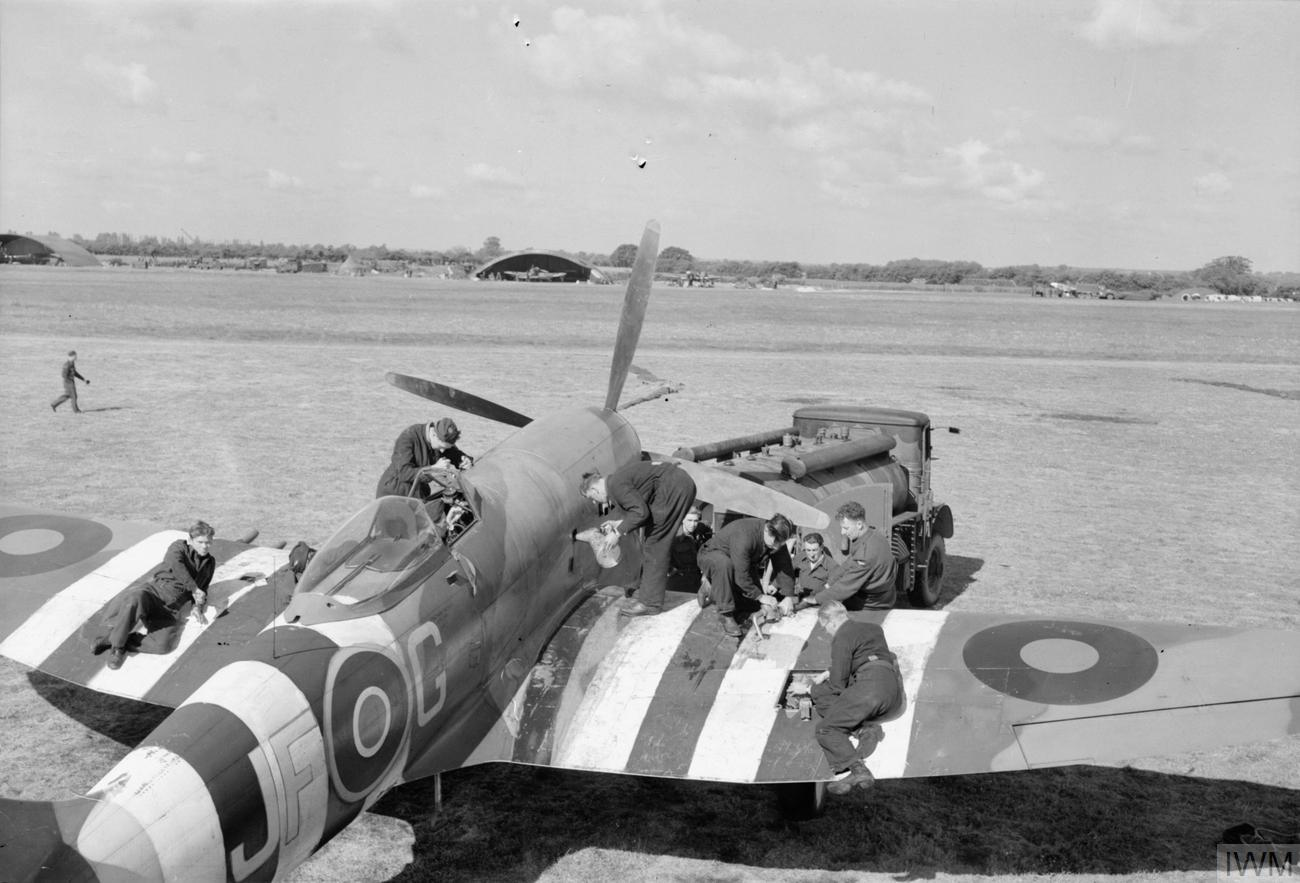
Hawker Tempest of Beamont's Wing at RAF Newchurch, 1944.

In mid-May 1943 he returned to Hawker as a test pilot, performing experimental testing of both the Typhoon and new Tempest. In February 1944 AOC Hugh Saunders invited Beamont to form the first Tempest wing (No. 150), with the rank of acting wing commander. At this time the available Tempests were dispersed around maintenance units; Beamont had to fly between the units to locate them. By May 1944 his wing had become operational with two Tempest squadrons (No 3 and No 486) and one with Spitfire IX. Their first operations were ground attack sorties against trains or airfields. On D-Day+2 (8 June) the wing shot down three Bf 109s over the invasion beaches without loss, the first one credited to Beamont and the first to a Tempest.

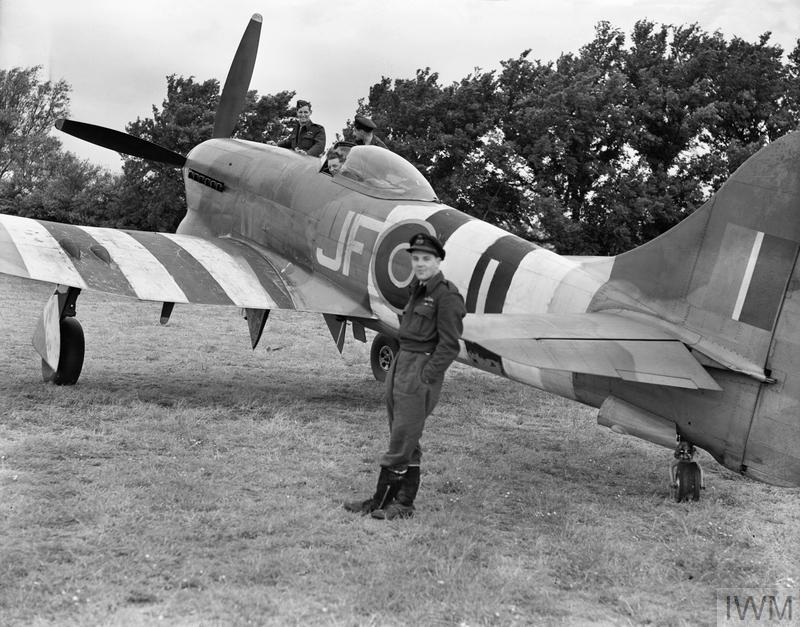
Wg Cdr R. P. Beamont, leaning against a Hawker Tempest V Series II of No. 3 Squadron RAF at Newchurch Advanced Landing Ground, Kent.

From his airfield at Newchurch, Beamont witnessed the first intrusion by V-1 flying bombs as they flew towards London at dawn on 14 June; two days later (16 June) his wing was switched to intercepting them. In the following days, he and his pilots would trial attack tactics by day and discuss their effectiveness in the evening. For instance, Beamont discovered first hand that attacking a V-1 at close range could result in a hazardous explosion. He established that the best attack was to approach from astern at an acute angle with the cannons synchronised to 200yds (180m). On at least one occasion Beamont defeated a V-1 by carefully sliding his wing-tip under that of the V-1 and flipping it. His fifth V-1 kill on the evening of 19 June made him the first V-1. ace. By the end of the V-1 campaign, 150 Wing had shot down 638, with Beamont accounting for 32. Around this time Beamont met Ernest Hemingway, who had flown over from America to report on the D-Day invasion and spent time in 150 Wing's officer's mess.

On 2 October 1944, now based on the continent at Volkel, the Netherlands, he achieved his ninth and final kill of the war when he shot down a Fw 190 near Nijmegen. On 12 October, on his 492nd operational mission, while attacking a heavily defended troop-train near Bocholt his Tempest's radiator was hit by flak. He crash landed without injury and became a prisoner of war (PoW). Confined firstly to Stalag Luft III at Żagań in Lower Silesia, then to Stalag III-A at Luckenwalde, Brandenburg, he remained a PoW until the end of the war in Europe (May 1945). Beamont and other POWs were detained for a few weeks by Soviet forces, and repatriated in late May.

At RAF Chilbolton Beamont formed the first wing of Hawker Tempest IIs in preparation for planned invasion of Japan. The Tempests were to escort bombers of Tiger Force over Japan. The operation was cancelled following the bombing of Hiroshima and Nagasaki. In May 1946 he was awarded the American Distinguished Flying Cross.

== Test pilot ==
=== Meteor and Vampire ===
At the end of the war Beamont was faced with a choice: a career as a test pilot or a permanent commission in the RAF. In October 1944 Philip Lucas had flown in to Vokel and invited him to become Hawker's deputy experimental test pilot after his tour. Unfortunately, during Beamont's period of captivity this position had been filled, but through Lucas he obtained an offer as a test pilot with Gloster. At the same time, he was appointed to the RAF's Air Fighting Development Unit, and applied for a permanent commission. The decision was made during a meeting with Sir James Robb, who indicated that the next phase of his RAF career was likely to be seven years behind a desk.

At Gloster, Beamont took the Meteor F4 through its early experimental test flight programme, culminating in a flight at 632 mph on 9 July 1946 in preparation for the official air speed record by the RAF. In August 1946 he moved to de Havilland as a demonstration pilot, with the aim of moving to experimental flying (particularly the DH 108 Swallow), however apart from demonstrations in the DH Vampire at air shows, the work was not challenging.

=== Canberra ===
The lack of opportunity to transfer to experimental flying at de Havilland caused him to look for more a demanding role. In October 1946 he was interviewed by Teddy Petter and Freddie Page for chief test pilot at English Electric, who at that time were designing Britain's first jet bomber. Petter was concerned about Beamont's lack of engineering qualifications, but Page pointed out they would "have plenty of good engineers but what was needed was a test pilot with operational experience". Beamont moved to English Electric in May 1947.

At this time English Electric were manufacturing D.H Vampires under licence but had no original aircraft to conduct research, particularly to explore the effects of compressibility. From his experience at Glosters, Beamont suggested to Petter that they borrow a Meteor F.4 to carry out high altitude research. Beamont made the first experimental test flight from the Warton Aerodrome in a Meteor on 28 August 1947.

To get Beamont experience of flying big jets the Ministry of Supply organised a visit to the United States to fly the North American B-45 Tornado, the Boeing B-47 Stratojet and the Martin XB-48. When he arrived in May 1948 only the B-45 was airworthy. Through William.G.A Perring (the director of the RAE) he was able to persuade the US authorities to give him permission to fly one of the only two XP-86 Sabres then built, based at Muroc Field. Briefed by test pilot George Welch, Beamont flew the XP-86 in May of that year, exceeding an indicated Mach 1 on his one and only flight in the aircraft, the third person to do so in the XP-86. (Note: It is likely that these flights were not supersonic. Investigations would later prove that the pitot tube on the XP-86 was affected by shock waves and the true Mach number was closer to 0.98. Beamont also noted that there was no sonic bang as there was in his later supersonic flights)

On 13 May 1949 he made the first flight of the Canberra prototype (VN799). Due to its reserves of power and low wing-loading the Canberra was highly manoeuvrable at any altitude, and Beamont would use this to advantage in his flying.On 13 September 1949 he demonstrated it at the Farnborough air show. Flight magazine described Beamont's display as "exhilarating", stating that "A new aircraft has never been more convincingly demonstrated" . This display was only marred by the inadvertent jettison of the 'automatic-observer' when Beamont opened the bomb bay doors to slow the aircraft, necessary because the prototype had no air-brakes. On 23 February 1951 he presented it to US Department of Defense officials contributing to the decision in the April for Canberras to be built under licence by the Glenn L. Martin Company as the B-57.

Beamont set two transatlantic records in the Canberra. Taking advantage of a delivery flight to Glenn Martin, he set a new record of 4 hr 18 min 29.4 sec, from Aldergrove, Northern Ireland, to Gander, Newfoundland, on 31 August 1951. The following year, Beamont had the distinction of being the first pilot to make a double-Atlantic crossing by jet, when on 26 August 1952, flying Canberra B.5 VX185, he again flew from Aldergrove to Gander and then back again to Aldergove, in 10 hours 3 minutes.

=== Lightning ===
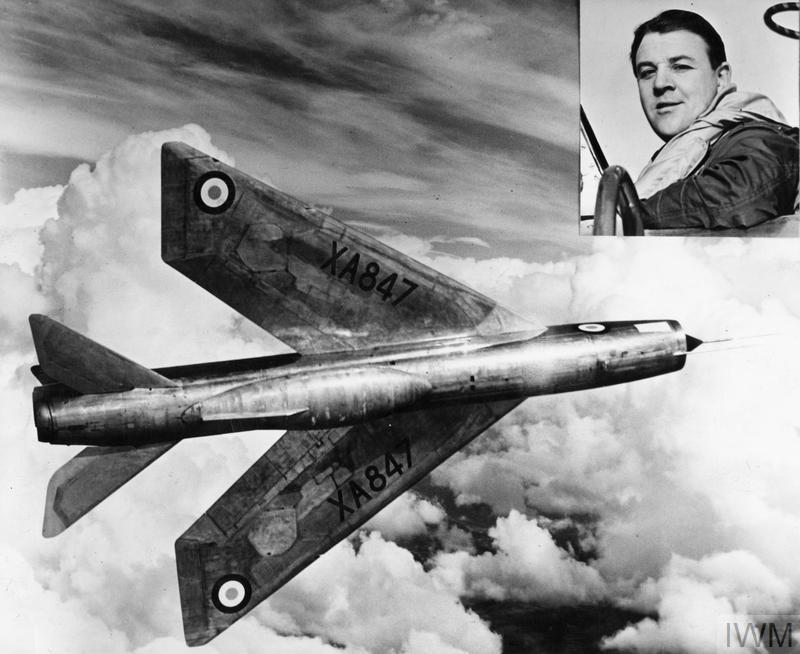
English Electric Lightning P1.B XA847 during trials in November 1958

The English Electric P.1 was to be the RAF's first Mach 2 interceptor and to achieve that speed it was a radical design with a 60° wing sweep. To gain relevant experience, Beamont flew the Short SB.5 fitted with the 60° sweep wing and Hunter II (WB202) (with the AS Sapphire Engines) (Note: The P.1A prototypes were fitted with two Armstrong Siddeley Sapphire engines, instead of the Avon engines of the P.1B) in April 1953. He made 23 test flights in the SB.5 up to May 1954. In July, Beamont was put in overall charge of flight test work at Boscombe Down when the P.1 was moved there prior to its first flight. He made a number of short hops in the P.1A during taxi runs between July and August. The first flight had been originally scheduled for 3 August, but Beamont accidentally triggered the engine bay fire extinguishers while reviewing the check lists, causing a delay while the engine bays were cleaned. On 4 August 1954 he made the first flight, which he described this as "classic technical success", albeit with a complete breakdown in radio communication between the pilots and ATC. One week later during its third flight, WG760 achieved Mach 1 in level flight for the first time. He followed this with a period of development flying in which he explored the envelope of the P1 culminating in a flight to Mach 1.5 in February 1956. (Note: The P.1A was limited to Mach 1.5 because of a lack of directional stability due to insufficient fin area. The original Air Ministry specification to which the P.1A had been designed had only called for a speed of Mach 1.5.) In 1955 Beamont was appointed flight operations manager.

On 4 April 1957 Beamont made the first flight of the P.1B (XA847, fitted with Avon engines) exceeding Mach 1 during this flight. On 25 November he reached Mach 2, the first time in a British aircraft. (Note: During the early flight trials of the P1.B speeds in excess of 1000 mph were achieved daily; during this period the Fairey FD2 delta held the world speed record (1132 mph achieved on 10 March 1956 and held till December 1957). While the P.1B was potentially faster than the FD2, it lacked the fuel capacity to provide one run in each direction at maximum speed to claim the record in accordance with international rules, see Beamont 1985 page 59)

=== TSR-2 ===
TSR-2 was conceived as a low-level supersonic interdictor aircraft. By September 1964 the flight test programme was 18 months behind schedule, the undercarriage was complex and unreliable; the engine development (Bristol Olympus Mk.320) had been delayed by a series of catastrophic failures. When the first airframe (XR219) was ready for flight, the cause of the engine failures had not been rectified. On 26 September 1964 a meeting was held at which the airworthiness of the engine was debated. As the test pilot, Beamont was allowed to decide if it should be flown the next day. He stated that "...in view of the mounting political pressures on the programme, it might be acceptable to take this level of risk for one flight only. But if we did then ... we do not fly again until we have fully adequately modified engines for the programme". Beamont made the first flight from Boscombe Down the next day (27 September 1964). The initial 15-minute test flight was with the undercarriage down and engine power strictly controlled. Despite this, Beamont noted that it was an impressively precise and controllable aeroplane.

Over the following three months the engines were modified and the undercarriage cleared for retraction, allowing the second flight to take place on 31 December 1964. Running short of day light, Beamont took off at 2:40 pm. Once airborne he noted poor forward vision, which he initially thought was due to glare from the low sun until he realised that his instrument panel also appeared blurred. Realising this was due to high frequency vibration affecting his eyes he throttled back No. 1 engine, determining the engine speed range over which this vibration was a problem. This problem forced Beamont to land XR219 with asymmetric thrust. (Note: The problem was traced to a malfunctioning fuel pump that was out-of-balance.)

Beamont was unable to retract the undercarriage satisfactorily on the third and fourth flights. On the fifth flight the undercarriage bogies jammed in a vertical orientation. He understood that this could cause a catastrophe on landing and offered the project navigator, Don Bowen, the opportunity to "use the Martin-Baker Mk.5 ejection seat". Don Bowen declined. Beamont was confident in the XR219's precise flying, so made a long approach at low descent rate (0.12 m/s) and successfully rotated the bogies by using the weight of the aircraft on landing. (Note: The tandem-wheel main wheel bogies on the TSR 2 rotated longitudinally 180 degrees around a horizontal pivot point at the bottom of the leg during retraction so that the two-wheel truck was upside down when stowed. The bogies were rotated by electric motors and the problem was traced to incorrect electrical sequencing of the retraction/extension procedure caused by excessive clearances on the actuating microswitches.) On the tenth flight Beamont successfully retracted the undercarriage, he cycled it twice and took XR219 out to 500 knots in stages. (Note: At that stage in the programme, XR219 had a flight resonance clearance of 500 kts) As TSR-2 was designed to follow contours at high speed, Beamont decided to fly it down Boscombe's runway at 100 ft and 450 knots, commenting later that it had "beautiful control".

On Flight 14 (22 February 1965) Beamont returned XR219 to BAC Warton. During the flight, he achieved exceeded Mach 1 for the first time, using dry power only. Following this, Beamont lit a single reheat unit (Note: Beamont lit a single reheat unit because of problems with the other engine's reheat fuel pump) with the result that the aircraft accelerated away from the chase Lightning.

== Directorship ==
In 1960 Beamont was appointed a special director of English Electric Aviation. In May 1965 he retired from prototype flying and was appointed as BAC Warton's flight operations director. He did however continue production test flying of Lightnings until 1968 when he retired from test flying altogether, by then he had flown 167 different types during a total of 5,100hr and 8,000 flights, of which more than 1,100 were supersonic.

In 1971, he became Panavia flight operations director, responsible for the testing of the Panavia Tornado, retiring in August 1979 following the maiden flight of the first production Tornado. After retirement he devoted himself to writing; contributing to various aeronautical publications and writing number of books about his experiences. He died on 19 November 2001 at the age of 81.

In 2002 he was posthumously awarded the Belgian Croix de guerre.

== Personal life ==
Beamont was a keen dinghy sailor and ornithologist

On 13 October 1942, he married Shirley Dagmar Adams, the WAAF officer he had transported to the dance in his Hurricane and the daughter of the artist Bernard Robert Adams, for which he was "quite properly court-martialled". They had a daughter Carol, born in 1943. Sadly, Shirley died in May 1945, two weeks before Roland was liberated from Luckenwalde.

On 14 March 1947 he married Patricia Whitehead, the daughter of Richard Galpine Raworth, solicitor. With Patricia he had two daughters and raised her son from her previous marriage. The grave of Patricia and Bea is in the churchyard of Pentridge village, SW of Salisbury.

== In popular culture ==
An AI companion based on Roland Beamont appears in several installments of the military science fiction franchise Halo.

== Books ==
- Phoenix into Ashes – Roland Beamont – William Kimber – 1968 – ISBN 0-7183-0121-8
- Typhoon and Tempest at War – Arthur Reed & Roland Beamont – Ian Allan – 1977 – ISBN 0-7110-0542-7
- Testing Years – Roland Beamont – Ian Allan – 1980 – ISBN 0-7110-1072-2
- English Electric Canberra – Roland Beamont & Arthur Reed – Ian Allan – 1984 – ISBN 0-7110-1343-8
- English Electric P1 Lightning – Roland Beamont – Ian Allan – 1985 – ISBN 0-7110-1471-X
- Fighter Test Pilot: From Hurricane to Tornado – Roland Beamont – HarperCollins – 1986 – ISBN 0-85059-850-8
- My Part of the Sky – Roland Beamont – Patrick Stephens – 1989 – ISBN 1-85260-079-9
- Testing Early Jets – Roland Beamont – Airlife – 1990 – ISBN 1-85310-158-3
- Tempest over Europe – Roland Beamont – Airlife – 1994 – ISBN 1-85310-452-3
- Flying to the Limit: Reminiscences of Air Combat, Test Flying and the Aircraft Industry – Roland Beamont – Patrick Stephens – 1996 – ISBN 1-85260-553-7
- The Years Flew Past: 40 Years at the Leading Edge of Aviation – Roland "Bee" Beamont – Crowood Press – 2001 – ISBN 1-84037-299-0
