= British Aircraft Corporation =

British aircraft manufacturer

- British Aircraft Corporation logo. The logo was adopted by British Aerospace, the successor to BAC.
- Founded: 1960; 66 years ago
- Defunct: 29 April 1977; 49 years ago
- Fate: Merged with Hawker Siddeley and Scottish Aviation
- Successor: British Aerospace
- Headquarters: London, England, UK

The British Aircraft Corporation (BAC) was a British aircraft manufacturer formed from the government-pressured merger of English Electric Aviation Ltd., Vickers-Armstrongs (Aircraft), the Bristol Aeroplane Company and Hunting Aircraft in 1960. Bristol, English Electric and Vickers became "parents" of BAC with shareholdings of 20%, 40% and 40% respectively. BAC in turn acquired the share capital of their aviation interests and 70% of Hunting Aircraft several months later.

== History ==
=== Formation ===
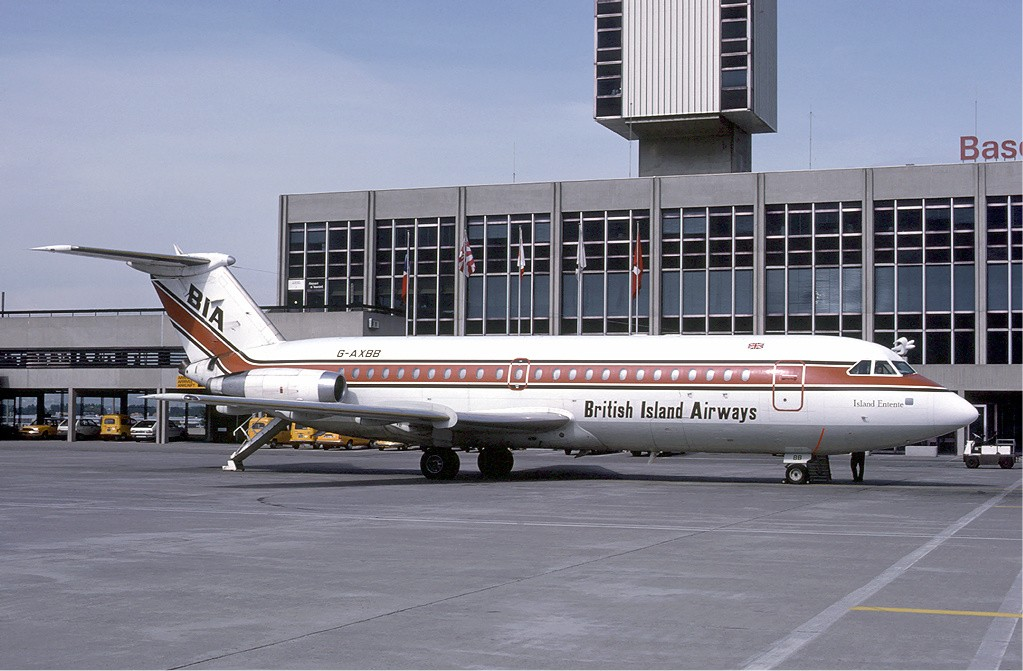
A BAC 1-11 passenger airliner

BAC's origins can be traced to a statement issued by the British government that it expected the various companies involved in the aircraft, guided weapons and engine industries to consolidate and merge with one another. Furthermore, the government also promised incentives to motivate such restructuring; the maintenance of government research and development spending and the guarantee of aid in launching "promising new types of civil aircraft". One particularly high-profile incentive was the contract for a new large supersonic strike aircraft, which would become the BAC TSR-2.

Accordingly, during 1960, BAC was created as a jointly owned corporation by Vickers, English Electric and Bristol. Internally, the business had two divisions – the Aircraft Division under Sir George Edwards and the Guided Weapons Division under Viscount Caldecote. The aircraft operations of the three parents were now subsidiaries of BAC; "Bristol Aircraft Ltd", "English Electric Aviation Ltd" (with Viscount Caldecote as general manager) and "Vickers-Armstrongs (Aircraft) Ltd" (under Sir George Edwards). BAC also had a controlling interest in Hunting Aircraft. The parents still had significant aviation interests outside BAC. English Electric had Napier & Son aero-engines, Bristol had 50% of Bristol Aerojet and Bristol Siddeley engines and smaller investments in Westland and Short Brothers & Harland.

Upon the formation of BAC, the Bristol Aeroplane Company (Car Division) was not included in the consolidation. Instead, it was carved off by Sir George White, 3rd Baronet, whose family had founded the British and Colonial Aeroplane Company in 1910 (later the Bristol Aeroplane Company).

BAC's head office was on the top floors of the 100 Pall Mall building in the City of Westminster, London.

=== Early endeavours ===
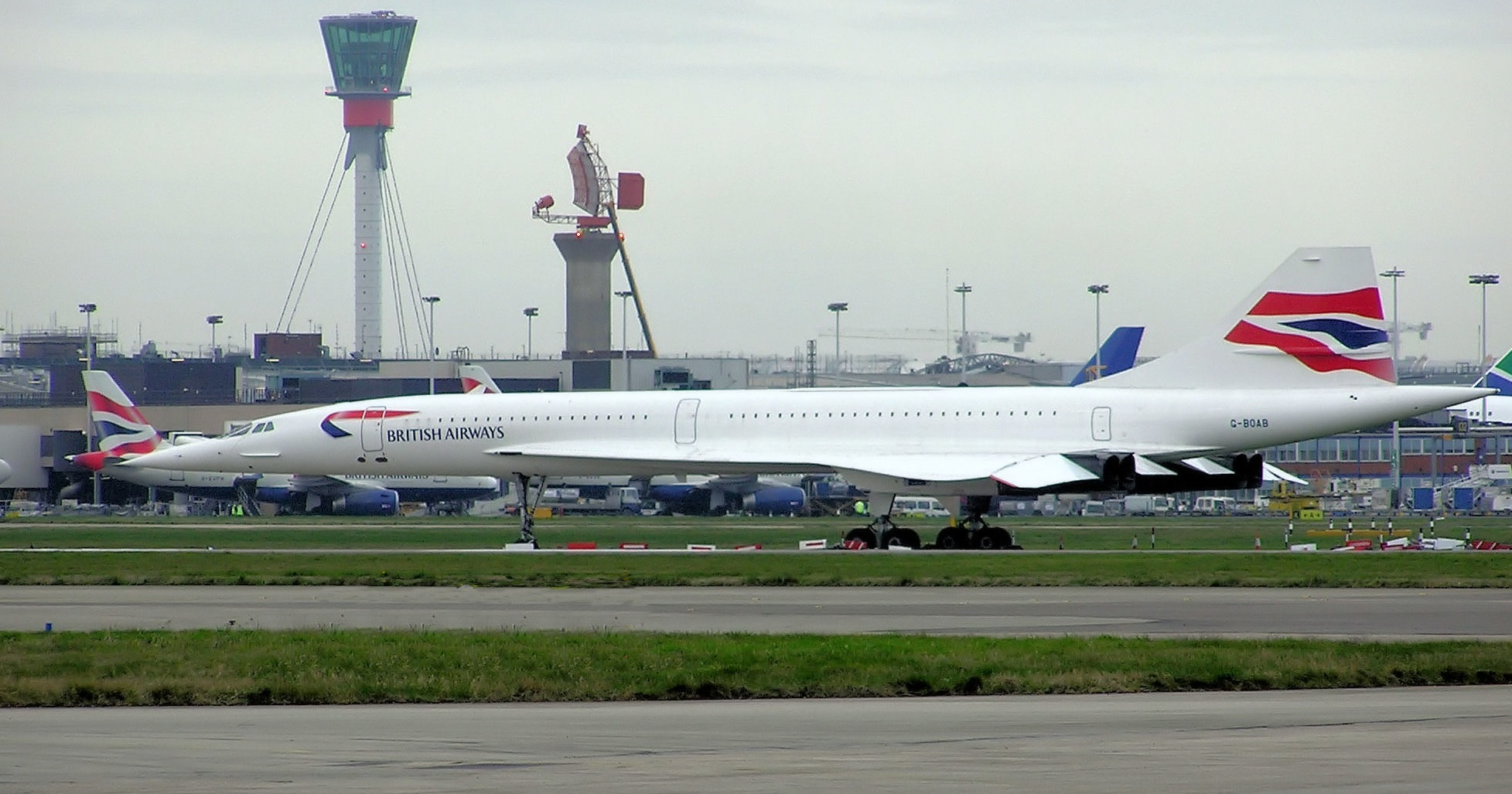
BAC Aérospatiale Concorde G-BOAB in storage at London Heathrow Airport following Concorde's grounding in 2000. This aircraft flew for 22,296 hours between its first flight in 1976 and its grounding.

The majority of BAC's aircraft designs had been inherited from the individual companies that formed it. BAC did not apply its new identity retrospectively, hence the VC10 remained the Vickers VC10. Instead the company applied its name to marketing initiatives, the VC10 advertising carried the name "Vickers-Armstrongs (Aircraft) Limited, a member company of the British Aircraft Corporation". The first model to bear the BAC name was the BAC One-Eleven (BAC 1–11), a Hunting Aircraft study, in 1961. Given the numerous government contract cancellations during the 1960s, the BAC 1–11, which had been launched as a private venture, probably saved the company.

Prior to the merger, Bristol had eschewed the subsonic airliner market in favour of working on the Bristol 223 supersonic transport, The effort continued under BAC and was eventually merged with similar efforts underway at the French aircraft company Sud Aviation, resulting in the Anglo-French Concorde. Described by Flight International as an "aviation icon" and "one of aerospace's most ambitious but commercially flawed projects", sales of the type were lackluster against conventional subsonic airliners, primarily due to the emergence of wide-body aircraft, such as the Boeing 747, which made subsonic airliners significantly more efficient. While by March 1969, the consortium had arrangements totalling 74 options from 16 airlines, only two airlines, Air France and the British Overseas Airways Corporation, would proceed with their orders. Scheduled services commenced on 21 January 1976 on both the London–Bahrain and Paris–Rio de Janeiro routes.

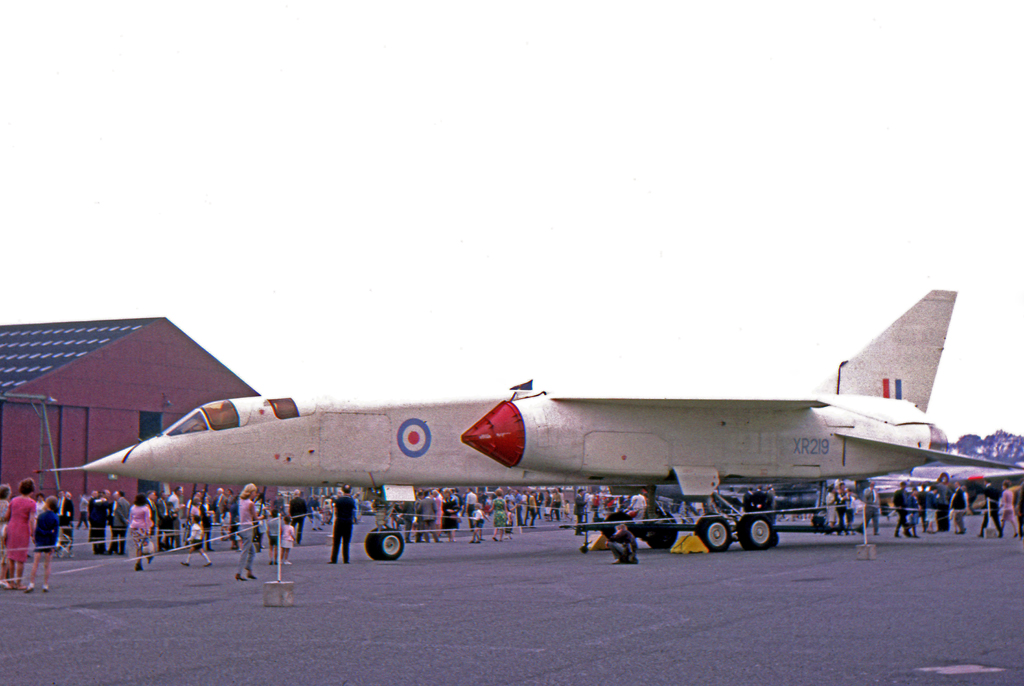
The prototype BAC TSR-2 at the Warton factory in 1966

In 1963, BAC acquired the previously autonomous guided weapons divisions of English Electric and Bristol to form a new subsidiary, British Aircraft Corporation (Guided Weapons). The company enjoyed some success, including development of the Rapier, Sea Skua and Sea Wolf missiles. BAC eventually expanded this division to include electronics and space systems and, in 1966, started what was to become a fruitful relationship with Hughes Aircraft. Hughes awarded major contracts to BAC, including sub-systems for Intelsat satellites.

BAC had inherited the aerospace activities of several companies via its formation, and research into various space-related ventures continued at the new entity. One of BAC's research teams, headed by engineer Tom Smith, Chief of the Aerospace Department at BAC, that was initially investigating supersonic and hypersonic flight problems, became interested in the application of such a vehicle for space-related activities, leading to the BAC Mustard, a reusable launch system that comprised several near-identical winged vehicles. In the most detailed design, Mustard was to have weighed roughly 420 tonnes prior to launch, and been capable of delivering a three tonne payload to a geostationary earth orbit (GEO). According to author Nigel Henbest, Britain was likely unable to pursue Mustard's development alone, but suggested organising a multinational European venture, similar to the conventional Europa and Ariane launchers. The knowledge and expertise developed on this project was subsequently harnessed on later efforts, most prominently the re-usable HOTOL spaceplane project of the 1980s.

Development of the TSR-2 was one of the company's most high-profile projects. However, as the programme proceeded, continuous cost rises were incurred, while inter-service rivalry led to frequent challenges of its necessity. During April 1965, the British government announced that it had decided to withdraw its order for the TSR-2, leaving it without an established customer. By this point, the programme was already in the prototype phase and the aircraft had already flown, but political pressure forced development work to cease, leading to the remaining airframes and most supporting equipment and documentation to be destroyed. The TSR-2's last minute termination has been widely viewed as a major blow not only to BAC but the wider British aircraft industry.

=== New ventures ===
On 17 May 1965, the British and French governments announced the signing of a pair of agreements to cover two joint projects; one based on the French aircraft company Breguet Aviation Br.121 ECAT ("Tactical Combat Support Trainer") proposal; this would evolve into the SEPECAT Jaguar. The other was the BAC/Dassault AFVG (Anglo-French Variable Geometry), a larger, variable geometry carrier-capable fighter aircraft for the French Navy (Aéronavale) as well as fulfilling interceptor, tactical strike and reconnaissance roles for the RAF. The AFVG was to be jointly developed by BAC and Dassault Aviation, while the proposed M45G turbofan engine to power the aircraft was to also be jointly developed by SNECMA and Bristol Siddeley. However, during June 1967, the French government announced its withdrawal from the AFVG effort ostensibly on the grounds of cost. (Note: According to aviation publication Flight International, Dassault had gained valuable data on variable-geometry configurations from the AFVG programme and may have used the excuse of cost issues in order to divert funds and data to their own VG projects.)

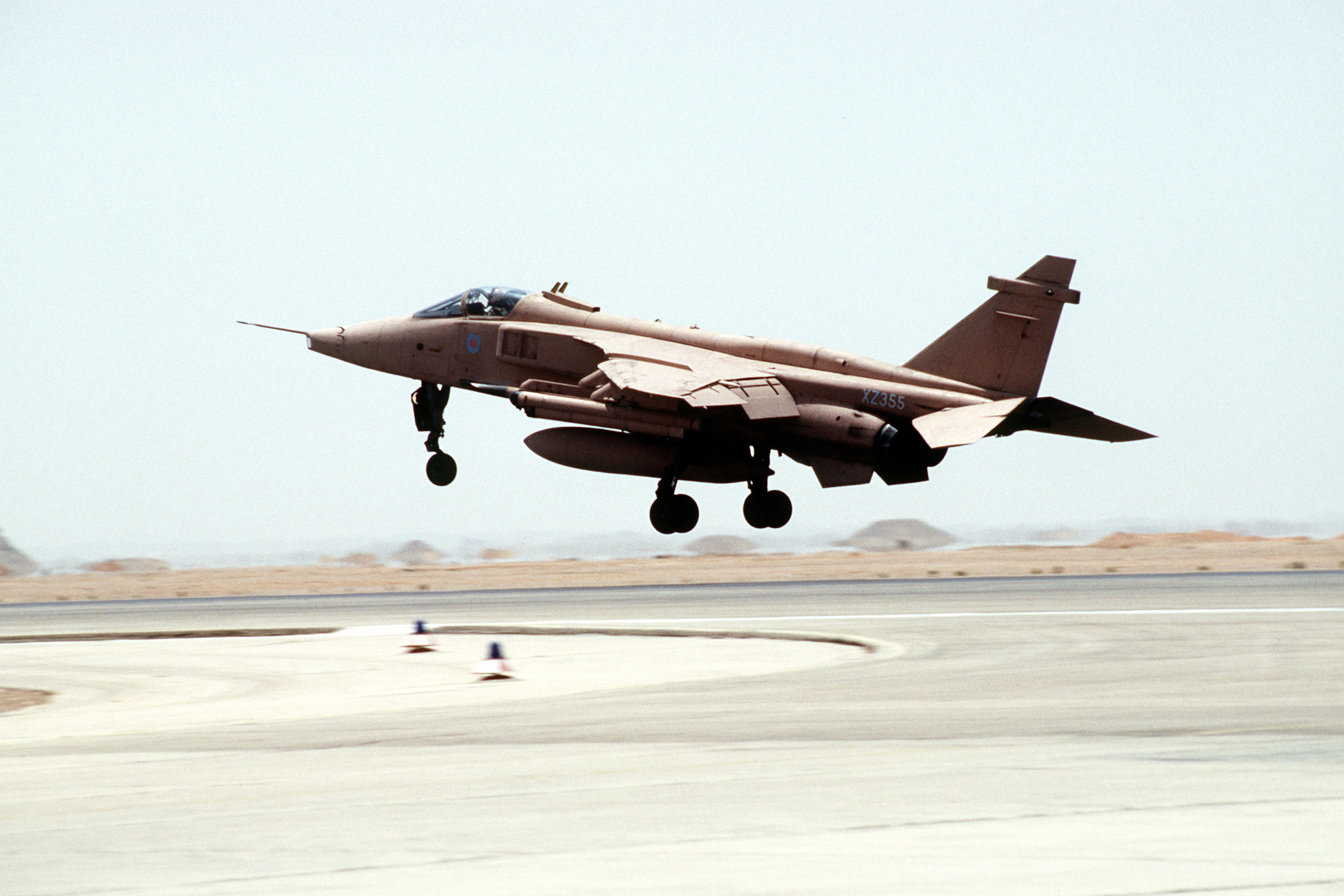
SEPECAT Jaguar

During May 1966, BAC and Breguet formally created SEPECAT, a joint venture company, to develop, market, and produce the Anglo-French Jaguar strike fighter. The Jaguar programme ultimately took the place of several earlier efforts, including the AFVG. The first of the Jaguar's eight prototypes flew on 8 September 1968. During 1973, service entry was achieved with the French Air Force, by which time Breguet had become part of Dassault Aviation. SEPECAT received various export orders for the Jaguar: overseas nations that flew the type included India, Ecuador, Nigeria and Oman. Dassault were less supportive of SEPECAT, preferring to promote its own aircraft; several potential customers for the Jaguar were convinced to order Dassault's Mirage series instead.

During 1964, both BAC and its principal domestic rival, Hawker Siddeley, conducted detailed studies on the prospects of producing stretched versions of their existing airliners, the VC10 and the Hawker Siddeley Trident. In the first half of the following year, BAC submitted its proposals for the production of two separate double-decker versions of the VC10, which was commonly referred to as the Super VC10; however, it was quickly recognised that the British government would be required to supply substantial support for the initiative to succeed, involving "several tens of millions of pounds". According to aviation author Derek Wood, the enlarged double-decker, which was to be equipped with the proposed Rolls-Royce RB178 turbofan engine, would have had good commercial prospects, yet financing for the programme was not forthcoming and the British Overseas Airways Corporation (BOAC) has ultimately opted to procure the rival Boeing 747 instead.

In 1967, the British, French and German governments agreed to start development of the 300-seat Airbus A300. BAC argued against the proposal in favour of their BAC Three-Eleven project, intended as a large wide-bodied airliner like the Airbus A300, Douglas DC-10 and Lockheed TriStar. Like the One-Eleven, it would have carried two Rolls-Royce turbofan engines, mounted near the tail, but have been able to accommodate up to 245 passengers seated in an eight abreast configuration at a 34-inch pitch (or up to 300 passengers at a 30-inch pitch). The British national airline British European Airways (BEA) was publicly interested in the type; during August 1970, BEA's chairman, Sir Anthony Milward, declared his personal optimism for the Three-Eleven. However, Britain's potential Common Market partners warned that, since the Three-Eleven would directly compete against the European Airbus, around which they had largely coalesced, the project effectively undermined British loyalty to the EEC which, at this point, the British government was interested in joining. On 2 December 1970, Frederick Corfield, the Minister for Aviation Supply, announced in the House of Commons that there would be no official backing from the government for the Three-Eleven programme.

=== Saudi Arabia ===
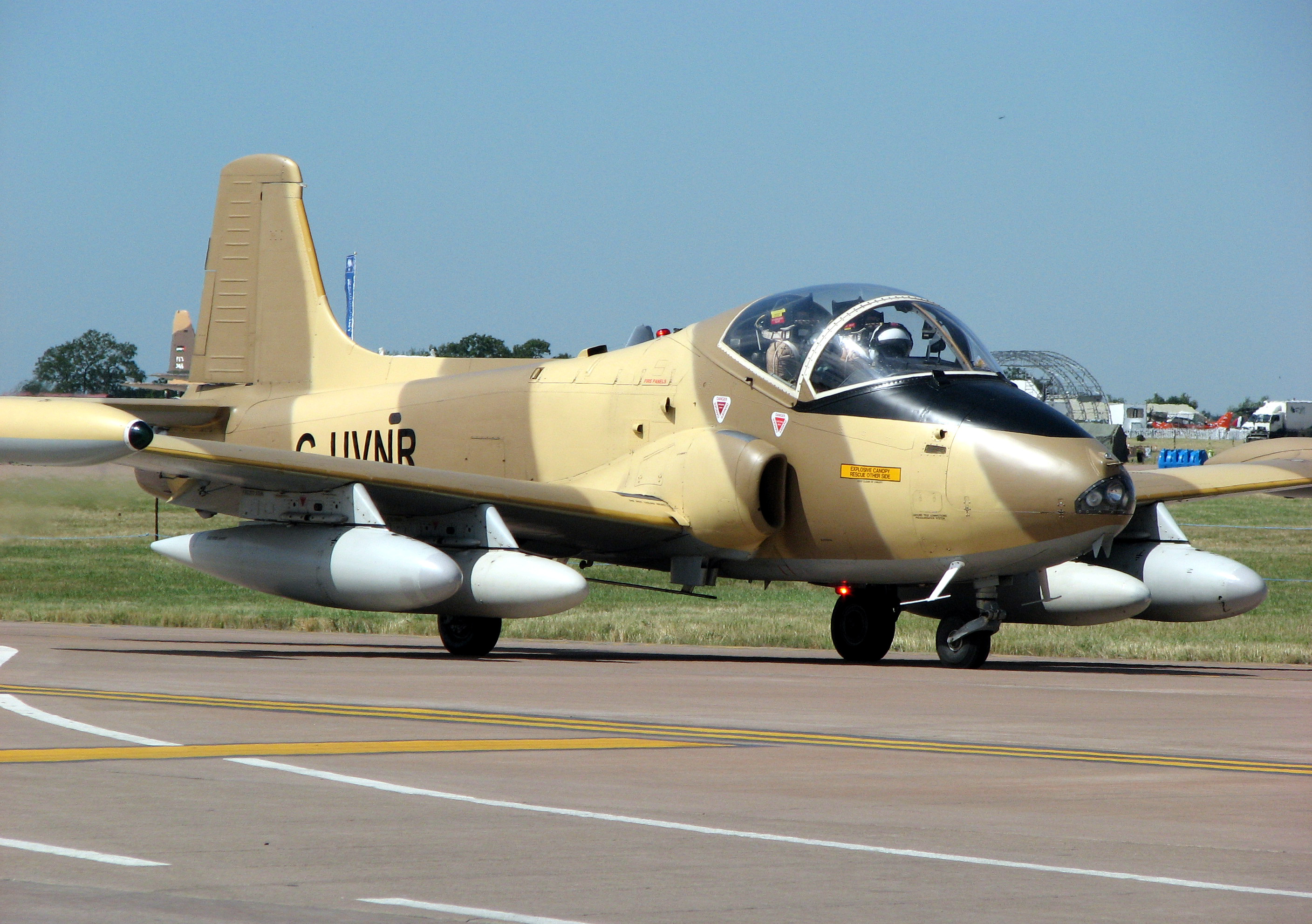
A privately owned BAC Strikemaster

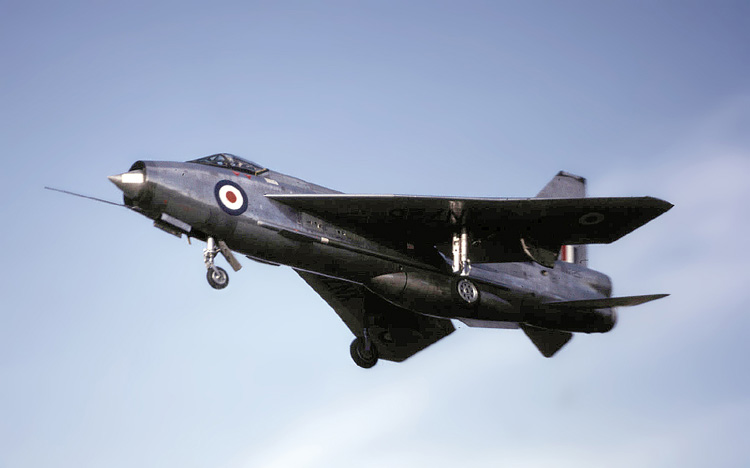
English Electric Lightning

During the early 1960s, the Saudi Arabian government announced its intention to launch a massive defence acquisition programme involving the replacement of the country's fighter aircraft and the establishment of an advanced air defence and communications network. American companies seemed guaranteed to win much of this work, however, the Royal Saudi Air Force (RSAF) would ultimately be supplied with large amounts of British-made aircraft and equipment to fulfill their needs.

By 1964, BAC conducted demonstration flights of their Lightning in Riyadh and, in 1965, Saudi Arabia signed a letter of intent to purchase Lightning and Strikemaster aircraft as well as Thunderbird surface-to-air missiles. The main contract was signed in 1966 for forty Lightnings and twenty-five (ultimately forty) Strikemasters. In 1973, the Saudi government signed an agreement with the British government which specified BAC as the contractor for all parts of the defence system (AEI was previously contracted to supply the radar equipment and Airwork Services provided servicing and training). Overall spending by the RSAF was over £1 billion GBP.

BAC, with the Lightning/Strikemaster contract; British Aerospace, with the Al Yamamah contracts; and most recently BAE Systems, with the order for Typhoon multi-role fighters, have all benefited from large arms contracts with Saudi Arabia.

=== Tornado ===
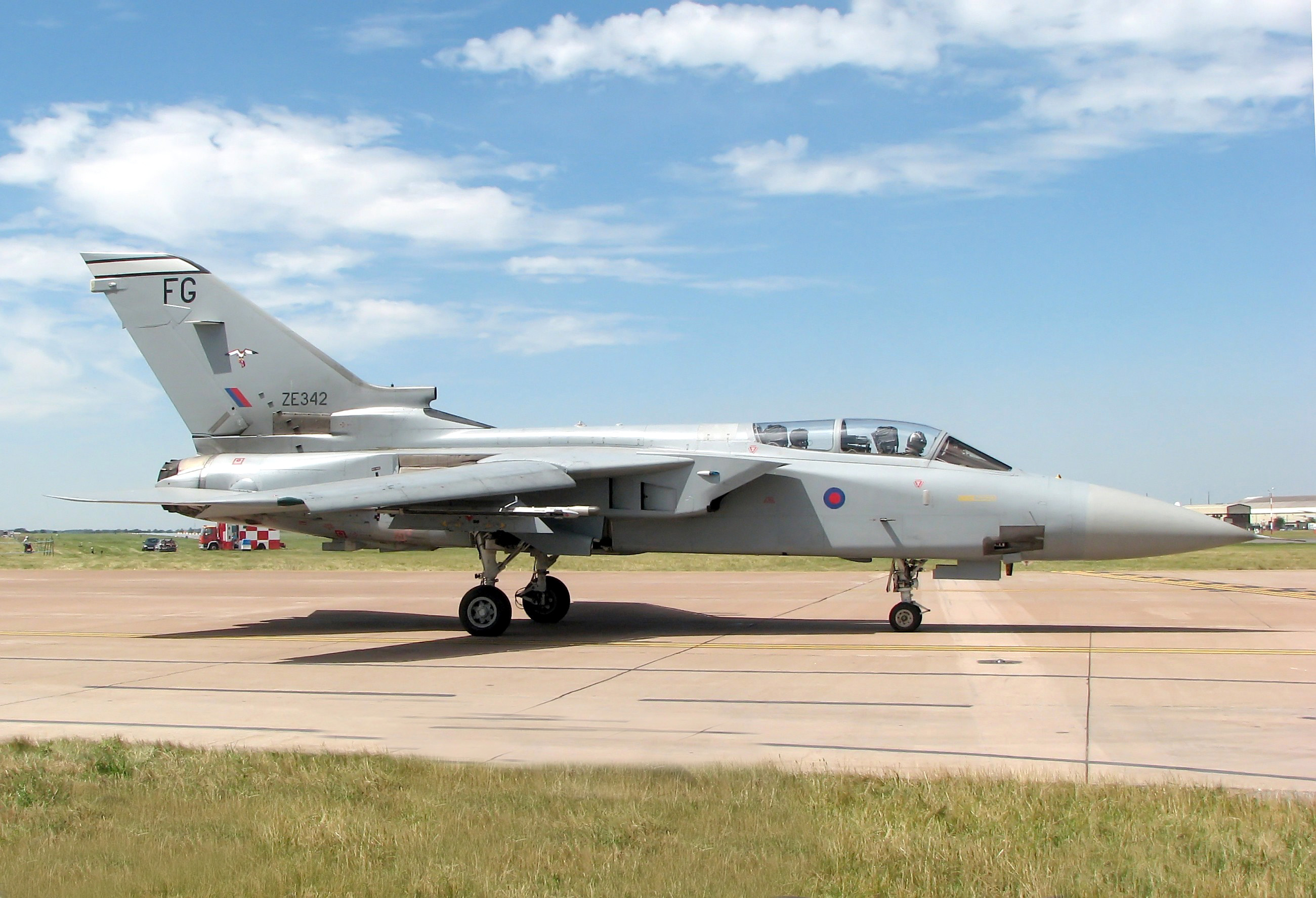
An RAF Panavia Tornado F3 (also known as the Tornado ADV) taxiing for take-off

In June 1967, the AFVG was cancelled due to the withdrawal of French participation. Britain then turned to a national project, the UK Variable Geometry (UKVG), for which BAC Warton was given a design contract by the Ministry of Technology. These studies eventually became known as the BAC Advanced Combat Aircraft programme. In 1968, Britain was invited to join Canada and the F-104 Consortium (a grouping of Germany, Italy, Belgium and the Netherlands), all of whom wished to replace their current aircraft with a common design, subsequently described as the Multi Role Combat Aircraft (MRCA).

On 26 March 1969, Panavia Aircraft GmbH was formed by BAC, MBB, Fiat and Fokker. In May, a "project definition phase" was commenced, concluding in early 1970. Two aircraft designs resulted: the single-seat Panavia 100 and the twin-seat Panavia 200. The RAF favoured the 200, as did Germany after its initial enthusiasm for the 100.

In September 1971, the governments of Britain, Italy and Germany signed an Intention to Proceed (ITP) with the Panavia Tornado. On 30 October 1974, the first British prototype (the second to fly) took off from the BAC airfield at Warton. The three governments signed the contract for Batch 1 of the aircraft on 29 July 1976. BAC and subsequently British Aerospace would deliver 228 Tornado GR1s and 152 Tornado F3s to the RAF.

=== Merger speculation and nationalisation ===
For most of its history, BAC was the subject of rumour and speculation that it was to merge with Hawker Siddeley Aviation (HSA). On 21 November 1966, Fred Mulley, the Minister of Aviation, announced in the House of Commons that:

...the government had come to the conclusion that the national interest would best be served by a merger of the airframe interests of BAC and Hawker Siddeley into a single company.

The government envisaged acquiring BAC's capital and merging it with Hawker Siddeley. The ownership of BAC would thus give the government a minority stake in the new company. Although BAC's parent companies were prepared to sell their shares for a reasonable price, the government proposal, in their view, undervalued the group. By August 1967, the success of the BAC 1–11 and defence sales to Saudi Arabia made the prospect of the parent companies selling their shares less likely. In December 1967, Tony Benn, the Minister of Technology, while reiterating his desire to see a merged BAC and HSA, admitted it would not be possible.

Akin to BAC, the Hawker Siddeley Group was expanded by merger, while engine design and manufacturing was concentrated at Rolls-Royce and the newly formed Bristol-Siddeley Engines. Helicopter development was given to Westland Helicopters.

During 1966, Rolls-Royce acquired Bristol Aeroplane from BAC, integrating the firm into its Bristol Siddeley aero-engine business, but declared it had no interest in the BAC shareholding. Despite this, Rolls-Royce still had not disposed of its BAC shareholding when the business was declared to be bankrupt during 1971. The 20% share was eventually acquired from receivership by Vickers and GEC, which had acquired English Electric during 1968.

On 29 April 1977, BAC, the Hawker Siddeley Group and Scottish Aviation were nationalised and merged under the provisions of Aircraft and Shipbuilding Industries Act 1977. This new group was established as a statutory corporation, British Aerospace (BAe).

== Products ==
Products usually known under the BAC name include:

=== Aircraft ===
- AFVG proposed and cancelled multi-role military jet
- BAC One-Eleven jetliner
- BAC Two-Eleven and BAC Three-Eleven – proposed and cancelled jetliners
- BAC 221 – jet fighter concept modified Fairey Delta 2 for Concorde development work
- BAC Jet Provost trainer aircraft
- BAC Strikemaster military attack jet
- BAC/Bristol Type 223 – supersonic jetliner
- BAC/Aérospatiale Concorde – supersonic jetliner
- BAC TSR-2 Tactical strike/reconnaissance jet fighter
- BAC/Bristol 188 – experimental jet
- BAC/Bristol Britannia – Turboprop airliner
- BAC/English Electric Canberra – jet bomber
- BAC/English Electric Lightning – supersonic jet fighter
- BAC/Hunting H.126 – experimental aircraft
- BAC/Hunting Jet Provost – military jet trainer
- BAC/Vickers Supermarine Scimitar – naval jet strike fighter
- BAC/Vickers VC10 – jet liner
- BAC/Vickers Viscount – Turboprop airliner
- BAC/Vickers Vanguard – Turboprop airliner
- Panavia Tornado/Panavia Tornado ADV – multi-role attack jet fighter; multinational project
- SEPECAT Jaguar – Ground attack jet fighter; Anglo-French project

=== Missiles ===
- BAC Rapier missile surface-to-air missile
- BAC Sea Skua helicopter-launched naval air-to-surface missile
- BAC Sea Wolf missile naval/shipborne-guided surface-to-air missile
- BAC Swingfire anti-tank missile
- BAC/Vickers Vigilant wire-guided anti-tank missile

In addition BAC continued with the Bristol Bloodhound and English Electric Thunderbird surface-to-air missiles.

=== Spacecraft ===
BAC was involved in uncrewed spacecraft, principally satellites

- Ariel 4 – research satellite
- Intelsat – communications satellite; BAC provided several sub-systems to Hughes (the prime contractor) and assembled Intelsat 4 as well as providing the structure solar panels and battery pack
- Prospero X-3 – experimental satellite
- Multi-Unit Space Transport And Recovery Device (MUSTARD) was a proposed launch system consisting of three reusable lifting body craft operating together.

== Key people ==
=== Aircraft designers and engineers ===
- Colin Baron
- Ray Creasey
- George Edwards
- Roy Ewans
- Frederick Page
- Archibald Russell
- Tom Smith
- Bill Strang

=== Test pilots ===
- Roland Beamont
- Jimmy Dell
- David Eagles

== See also ==
- Aerospace industry in the United Kingdom
