= BAC Mustard =

Re-usable space launch system

Multi-Unit Space Transport And Recovery Device
- Manufacturer: British Aircraft Corporation (BAC)
- Country of origin: UK

Size
- Height: 118 feet 0 inches (35.97 m)
- Diameter: 13 feet 1 inch (3.99 m)
- Mass: 424,270 kilograms (935,360 lb)
- Stages: 2

Capacity

Payload to GEO
- Mass: 2,268 kilograms (5,000 lb)

Launch history
- Status: Cancelled
- Total launches: 0

stage
- Powered by: 1
- Maximum thrust: 2,150 kilonewtons (480,000 lbf)
- Specific impulse: 405
- Burn time: 215 seconds
- Propellant: LOX/LH2

The Multi-Unit Space Transport And Recovery Device or MUSTARD, usually written as Mustard, was a reusable launch system concept that was explored by the British Aircraft Corporation (BAC) during the mid-1960s.

Mustard was intended to operate as a multistage rocket, the individual stages comprising near-identical spaceplane modules. These planes, or stages, were hypersonic vehicles, capable of flying at speeds in excess of five times the speed of sound. Following a vertically standing launch, each stage was to progressively separate during the ascent, after which they would individually fly back towards a suitable landing strip. The final spaceplane was to be capable of attaining such an altitude that it would be able to achieve a sub-orbital trajectory before also performing a controlled return. Following a conventional landing, all of the stages were intended to be reused multiple times. It was projected that Mustard was suitable for launching payloads weighing as much as 2,300 kg (5,000 lb) into orbit.

The concept originated from studies performed by British manufacturing conglomerate English Electric, who had drawn inspiration from an American proposal, the Douglas Astro, which was proposed in 1962. Throughout the 1960s, the Mustard project was refined and prepared for programme launch. However, financing for the initiative was not forthcoming from the British government and the concept ultimately languished following the completion of the last major design study in early 1967. According to BAC's successor company BAE Systems, the projected cost of completing Mustard's development had been estimated as being between 20 and 30 times cheaper than the conventional expendable launch system used for the American Apollo program. The knowledge and expertise from Mustard was applied in various other avenues, the most prominent being the HOTOL spaceplane programme during the 1980s.

== History ==
=== Origins ===
During the 1940s and 1950s, the United Kingdom had undertaken numerous independent space-related ventures, such as the Black Knight ballistic missile programme and the abortive Black Arrow satellite launcher. While the ambitions of these programmes had been tempered both by cost and a political desire to collaborate with other Commonwealth and Western nations, such as the Europa launcher, Britain retained a considerable interest in the pursuit of various space-related technologies. The field of re-usable space vehicles was no exception to this interest, British manufacturing conglomerate English Electric had undertaken preliminary work on the topic at their facility in Warton, Lancashire, as part of a government-sponsored series of wider studies into high-speed vehicles and sub-orbital spaceplanes. During 1960, the aerospace activities of English Electric merged with those of multiple other firms in the formation of the British Aircraft Corporation (BAC). The new entity continued its sponsored research into these concepts.

According to author Nigel Henbest, one of BAC's research teams, headed by engineer Tom Smith, Chief of the Aerospace Department at BAC, that was initially investigating supersonic and hypersonic flight problems, became interested in the application of such a vehicle for space-related activities. The team compared their performance estimates of a winged reusable launch vehicle against conventional multistage rockets, determining that the approach was not cost-effective, largely due to it requiring different rockets to power each stage. Instead, by simplifying the launcher to use near-identical winged vehicles, considerable cost savings would then be achievable both in terms of its development and manufacture. Associated costs would have been further reduced by all of the elements being reusable and without any need for post-mission refurbishment, only requiring refuelling. Furthermore, the scale of the vehicles could be increased or decreased to produce launch vehicles to suit virtually any weight and thrust requirements.

It has been claimed that from an early stage, BAC's space-related research was being influenced by foreign space programmes, most significant of these being the United States; reportedly, the company engaged in detailed studies of various transatlantic projects and proposals. One particular proposed vehicle, the Douglas Astro, is said to have impressed British researchers; around the beginning of 1964, the Astro was adopted as a conceptual starting point for BAC's own clustered design, which the company came to refer to as the Multi-Unit Space Transport And Recovery Device or MUSTARD; however, in common parlance, this moniker was usually written simply as Mustard. In the most intensely-studied design, Mustard was to have weighed roughly 420 tonnes prior to launch, and be capable of delivering a payload of three tonnes into a geostationary earth orbit (GEO).

=== Stall and termination ===
During 1964, the design of Mustard had reached the point where it was effectively complete. However, Smith acknowledges that in order to have continued the project through to the manufacturing stage, several billion pounds of investment would have been required, the financing of which was neither budgeted nor planned for by any entity. Writing for the scientific periodical New Scientist, author Nigel Henbest commented that it was unlikely that Britain could pursue the development of Mustard alone, but also suggested that there was potential value for the platform if organised as a multinational European venture, similar to the conventional Europa and Ariane launchers.

In early 1967, the last major design study on the topic was drawn up, after which the project was continued at a lower level until work on Mustard was finally terminated in 1970 by the British government, who had decided to participate in the new American post-Apollo project instead. Accordingly, a number of key Mustard project staff had spent the first two years of the 1970s overseas at North American Rockwell, where they contributed to the initial study which would eventually lead to the US Space Shuttle. Around this time, the prospect of collaboration is said to have faded and, in the absence of significant interest from the British government, the Mustard project was effectively terminated.

In early 1977, BAC was itself later merged with rival Hawker Siddeley to form British Aerospace (B.Ae) and when the reusable HOTOL spaceplane project arose in 1984, the project team was relocated to Warton, where they took advantage of the expertise that had been accumulated during the earlier Mustard project. Writing of Mustard's cancellation, Henbest wrote that the absence of "political courage" had been largely responsible for the failure of the venture to become reality; furthermore, if further research had been financed by the Ministry of Aviation, then Britain may have been able to play a larger role in other space programmes, such as the American Space Shuttle.

== Design ==
=== Modules ===
Mustard was a modular reusable space launch system, comprising multiple copies of a single vehicle design, each of which was configured for a different role as a booster stage or an orbital spaceplane. The core vehicle design resembled the basic layout of the Douglas Astro, both being delta-winged reusable vehicles, as would the later American Space Shuttle. Furthermore, all three functioned as vertically launched rockets and used integral wings so that they could land horizontally, akin to an aeroplane.

The design evolved through a total of fifteen proposed variants or schemes, each typically comprising a deep-keeled lifting-body airframe with delta wings in a smooth blended wing body layout, with twin tail fins rising from the wing tips and canted outwards. Some early variants featured a compound-delta wing, complete with inboard tail fins. Power was provided by an arrangement of between one and four rocket engines positioned upon the rear fuselage. Due to the relatively low re-entry speed anticipated, it was believed that complex heat-resistant tiling could be dispensed with in favour of simpler and cheaper nickel-alloy panelling across the vehicle's underside. Mustard was to be crewed by between three and six astronauts.

Operationally, there were two primary vehicle configurations, the orbiter and booster stages, respectively. The orbiter vehicle, which carried the desired payload, featured ducting to receive fuel from the boosters, while the booster units incorporated systems for transferring fuel across to the orbiter vehicle or between one another. In this fashion, the orbiter could remain fully topped-up for its long orbital injection flight, while all the vehicles could still share a standardised fuel tank design. According to Smith, the orbiting vehicle would have been capable of performing between 30 and 50 launches before needing to be replaced, while the booster engines, which wouldn't have been subject to as much heat and stress, would have remained usable for up to 200 times.

=== Clustering and stacking ===
Various clustering and stacking arrangements were explored. Where the Astro would have launched as a two-stage step-rocket, for which the booster would have been much larger than the orbiter, Mustard comprised from three to five near-identically sized modules. Early studies focused on a vehicle with a shallow 120° "vee" underside to both body and wings so that three could be clustered in a triangle. Some included a fourth, orbital vehicle mounted on top of three boosters. The most efficient regime was to empty one booster at a time, keeping the others topped up for as long as possible, so that the first-stage booster could be dropped as soon as possible. The three boosters would be emptied in turn. But this led to an asymmetric mass loading which BAC believed to be a significant problem, so later designs used a sideways stacking system in which flatter modules were stacked more like sheets of paper.

At 150,000 to 200,000 ft (46,000 to 61,000 m), at around 30 nautical miles, the last of the booster units would separate; once clear, these units would glide downwards and land upon a runway similar to conventional aircraft, allowing for their reuse. The spacecraft would place its payload into orbit at around 1,000 nautical miles, which would be achieved roughly 10 minutes after launch, and then return to Earth via a controlled gliding descent before conducting a landing in a similar fashion to the booster units. Originally, it was envisioned that all three vehicles would be crewed, however, when commenting during the mid-1980s, Smith observed that, due to technological advances, it would be possible for the booster units to be entirely automated using existing technology.

== See also ==
- List of canceled launch vehicle designs
- HOTOL
- Space Shuttle
- Triamese
