= Frederick Page =

English aircraft designer and manager

Sir Frederick William Page OBE FRAeS FRS FREng
- Born: 20 February 1917; Wimbledon, Surrey, England
- Died: 29 May 2005 (aged 88); Mudeford, Dorset, England
- Education: St Catharine's College, Cambridge
- Engineering career
- Discipline: Aerospace
- Institutions: Royal Aeronautical Society
- Projects: English Electric Lightning
- Significant design: BAC TSR-2
- Awards: British Gold Medal for Aeronautics (1962), Gold Medal of the Royal Aeronautical Society (1974)

Sir Frederick William Page CBE FRS FREng (20 February 1917 – 29 May 2005) was an English aircraft designer and manager. He had large involvements with two British aircraft projects - the English Electric Lightning and the BAC TSR.2. Arguably, the sum total of his contribution to the British aerospace community over a period of 45 years until his retirement in 1983 was greater than that of any other individual.

== Early life ==
Frederick William Page was born at Wimbledon, London on 20 February 1917, the only child of Richard Page, a chauffeur then serving in the army, and his wife, Ellen Sarah, née Potter. (Note: The same day as Bob Feilden, another Cambridge-educated aerospace engineer) His father was killed on active service in France a few months before his birth and he was brought up by his mother with only her income as a domestic servant. He won a scholarship to Rutlish Grammar School followed by a Surrey County Major Scholarship and entrance to St Catharine's College, Cambridge in 1935. He was awarded a College Exhibition for the first-year result in Mathematics Part 1, and took Aeronautics as a special subject in the two final years, where he achieved the rare distinction of a Star first-class honours with special distinction in Aeronautics and Mathematics. He was also elected a Scholar of St Catharine's.

== Career ==
=== Hawker Typhoon and Tempest ===
From his mid-teens Page had ambitions to design aircraft, but it was not a dream of the marvels of flight that motivated him, instead it was the recognition that aircraft design was the most rapidly advancing of all the branches of engineering and therefore a field in which new things could he created. After graduating in 1938 he joined Hawker Aircraft at Kingston upon Thames working under Sydney Camm. As his career at Hawkers developed he was increasingly asked to help solve difficult problems. The Typhoon was subject to severe propeller-induced vibration and to counter this Page developed anti-vibration mountings for the engine and a sprung seat for the pilot. But it was in the aerodynamics and control of the Tempest that he made major contributions.

The Tempest fighter was to be designed to incorporate a laminar flow wing, and the shape of the aerofoil section would be critical in minimizing the effect of air compressibility at 500 m.p.h. On his own initiative he developed a method to predict the pressure distribution over the wing using mathematical formulae to describe the shape of the wing section combined with a solution of air compressibility equations. These were calculated using the only available tools of the time, an eight-digit mechanical desk calculator and a very large slide rule. When tested these compared well with results from a small wind tunnel in the US, and it was concluded that the maximum thickness should be moved back to 40% of the chord.

His other innovation was the design of a spring-tab system for the Tempest ailerons to improve the rate of roll in combat. It worked perfectly and was patented. This design of spring tabs later formed an important element of the Canberra.

By 1944 Page was one of Hawker's senior aerodynamicists. In October he met Teddy Petter who was recruiting a design team for English Electric to develop a jet powered replacement for the Mosquito to specification B1/44 (later to become the Canberra). Their second meeting was at dinner in Kingston. When the meal was over, Petter brought out a set of drawings which were too big for the table and the two got down on hands and knees crawled over the design and started its analysis. Petter offered the position of chief stressman to Page who accepted under the following conditions; as well as stress, he wanted to be in charge of weight balancing, structural and mechanical testing, he wanted all drawings to be routed through the stress office. Also, based on his experience at Hawkers it was agreed he could make suggestions on aerodynamic design. During these discussions Page was openly critical of Westland and Petter's designs such as the Whirlwind and Welkin. However, despite this Page received his letter of appointment in April 1945.

=== English Electric Canberra and Lightning ===
Petter's original B1/44 concept used a pair of Metrovick centrifugal engines mounted in the fuselage. Page was certain that to obtain the required high performance, the weapons load and fuel would have to be carried in the fuselage, and that this would need two wing mounted engines. Page's influence on the Canberra design was such that although the overall concept was Petter's, much of the radical thinking underlying it, such as the undercarriage design and the spring tab control surfaces, was Page's, driven by his meticulous scientific analysis. He guided the structural design so successfully that by the first flight in May 1949 the weight was actually 0.5% less than the original estimate.Prior to this he had worked closely with Petter in building the design team; concerning Roland Beamont's lack of engineering qualifications, Page had pointed out they would "have plenty of good engineers but what was needed was a test pilot with operational experience"

In the summer of 1948 English Electric started to develop a design proposal for a supersonic fighter under experimental research specification E.R.103 which would eventually become the Lightning. Page was assigned to lead the design with Ray Creasey responsible for the aerodynamics. By July 1948 their proposal incorporated the stacked engine configuration, a high mounted tail plane, but was designed for Mach 1.5 and a consequence it had a conventional 40° degree swept wing. This proposal was submitted in the November and in January 1949 the project was designated P.1 by English Electric. On 29 March 1949 MoS granted approval for English Electric to start the detailed design, develop wind tunnel models and build a full size mock up. The design that had developed during 1948 evolved further during 1949. To achieve Mach 2 the wing sweep was increased to 60° with the ailerons moved to the wing tips and later (after wind tunnel tests) the height of the tail plane was lowered.

By early 1950 the relationship between the Preston manufacturing works (led by Arthur Sheffield) and the Warton design team had deteriorated. With the demanding P1 Lightning programme ramping up, Petter demanded more autonomy for Warton as a condition of his continued service with English Electric. However, Sir George Nelson (English Electric's managing director) was unable to reach a compromise acceptable to both Petter and Sheffield. Page tried to persuade Petter to stay on with a promise to assist Petter in fighting Arthur Sheffield's establishment, but from December 1949 Petter ceased to take an active part in the team and Page took over the day-to-day management. At the end of 1949 Petter only appeared once again at Warton to speak to a few people and clear his office, until in February 1950 Petter resigned and Page was formally appointed his successor.

After Petter left, the stress of re-establishing the Warton organisation, while maintaining tight control of the Canberra development and the P1 design resulted in period of ill health for Page. During this illness, key members of the team rallied round keeping the vital activities on schedule until he recovered.

He was appointed CBE in 1961, and knighted in 1979. He became a Fellow of the Royal Academy of Engineering in 1977 and was elected a Fellow of the Royal Society in 1978.

=== British Aerospace ===
British Aerospace was formed by the merger of BAC, Hawker Siddeley and Scottish Aviation. He became chairman and chief executive from 1977 until 1982, when he retired. Key projects in BAC and later BAe were three supersonic strike aircraft of great penetrability, the experimental TSR.2 (1964) and the multi-national Jaguar (1968) and Tornado IDS (1974), both with an excellent combat record.

== Personal life ==
On 6 July 1940 he married Kathleen Edith de Courcy (1916–1993), taking the weekend off for their two-day honeymoon. Kathleen was a 24-year-old ARP warden and artist, the daughter of Albert Edwin de Courcy, a Post Office official. They had four children, Gordon (born in November 1943), Stephen, Alan and a daughter, Jennifer, born later when they were living in Lancashire. Gordon Page also became an aeronautical engineer, later becoming chairman of Cobham plc.

After his retirement, Page decided to avoid engagement in consultancy or non-executive directorships. He was involved in a range of activities with the Royal Academy of Engineering, the Royal Society, the Royal Institution, Cheltenham College and also the Farnham Maltings.

Kathleen died in 1993. Page himself died of myelodysplasia on 29 May 2005 at Avon Reach nursing home, Farm Lane, Mudeford, Dorset.

== Patents ==
- GB application 570907, John Vivian Stanbury & Frederick William Page, "Improvements in or relating to the cooling of aircraft engines", published 27 July 1945, assigned to Hawker Aircraft Limited
- GB patent 574177, Frederick William Page, "Improvements in Aircraft Control Surface Actuating Means", published 10 January 1944, issued 27 December 1945, assigned to Hawker Aircraft Limited
- US patent 2642237, Stanley George Hooker & Frederick William Page, "Automatic fuel feed control system for aircraft power plants", published 16 June 1953, issued 16 June 1953, assigned to English Electric Co Ltd, and Rolls-Royce
- GB application 1026810, Frederick William Page; Raymond Frederick Creasy & Joseph Thomas Froud, "Improvements in and relating to Air Jet Thrust Supported Craft", published 20 April 1966, assigned to British Aircraft Corporation

== Quotes ==
“It has always seemed odd to me that, particularly in UK, financial, commercial and business school people with little or no practical experience or training in the industry are considered to be suitable for the top boardroom posts whereas engineers have been regarded with suspicion. Perhaps it is because most city types and politicians are geared to short term thinking and buzz words but aeronautical engineers must be creative and think long term”

— Sir Frederick Page, quoted from chapter 28 of his memoirs, held by the Royal Aeronautical Society.
