= Ray Creasey =

Ray Creasey OBE
- Born: December 18, 1921; Barnes, London, England
- Died: July 16, 1976 (aged 54)
- Education: University of London
- Children: 1
- Engineering career
- Discipline: Aerodynamics
- Institutions: Royal Aeronautical Society (Fellow); AIAA (Fellow)
- Employer(s): Vickers-Armstrongs; English Electric; British Aircraft Corporation
- Projects: English Electric Lightning, BAC TSR-2, Panavia Tornado, Eurofighter Typhoon
- Significant design: Supersonic wing design, variable geometry
- Awards: RAeS Silver Medal (1974); NATO Award (1976)

Ray Creasey

Raymond Frederick ″Ray″ Creasey OBE (18 December 1921 – 16 July 1976) was a British aerodynamicist with British Aircraft Corporation (previously English Electric) from 1948 until his death in 1976. He was responsible for the aerodynamics of the Lightning interceptor aircraft.

== Early life and education ==
Ray Creasey was born in Barnes, London on 18 December 1921. He won a scholarship to Hampton Grammar School. He had contracted polio as a child and this resulted in his rejection for military service at the outbreak of war. Wanting to contribute to the war effort, he joined a special projects team at Vickers-Armstrongs, rather than accepting a university place. While working full time at Vickers he studied for the Royal Aeronautical Society's Associate Fellowship Examinations, taking first place in all three subjects of Aerodynamics, Applied Mathematics, and Design (Aircraft) in 1942 at age 20. He was also awarded the Baden Powell Memorial Prize. He then took his degree at night school, graduating from the University of London with a first class honours degree in Science (Engineering) in 1944.

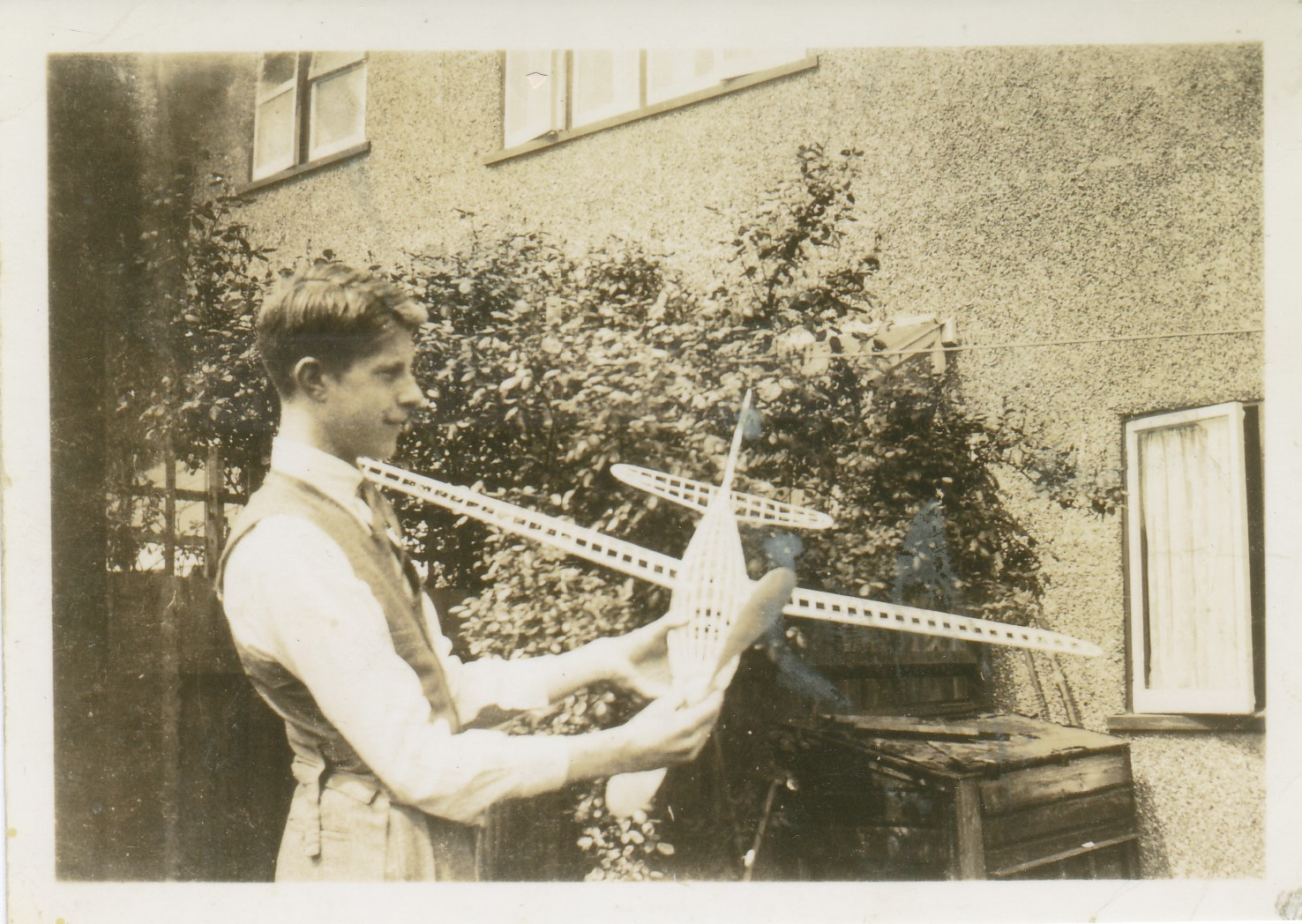
Young Ray Creasey with model plane

== Career ==
=== Vickers-Armstrongs ===
The early years of his working life were with Vickers-Armstrongs, where he joined Barnes Wallis's special projects team, working on projects which included the Dam Busters' bouncing bomb, also known as Operation Chastise.

=== English Electric ===
In 1946 he moved to Preston to join the aeronautical design department at English Electric, which had been set up in 1944-1945 in an expansion from aircraft manufacturing to include design. In 1960 English Electric merged with Vickers-Armstrongs and Bristol Aeroplane Company to become BAC (British Aerospace Company). Further expansion and mergers created the formation, in turn, of British Aerospace and the current BAE Systems.

Ray Creasey joined English Electric as an aerodynamicist, becoming Chief Aerodynamicist for the P1 project in 1950, when Teddy Petter left the company. He provided "a major input to the aerodynamic design of the A1 bomber (Canberra) and particularly the P1 (Lightning)". In 1959 he became Director of Engineering.

In an account of Ray Creasey's contributions to the company written by Ron Dickson and Frank Roe, who are themselves also described as "founding fathers of BAE" in the BAE publication of that name, they describe the importance of his ideas for wing design and his contribution to supersonic fighter planes:

Even before Canberra first flew, Ray was seeking to design a supersonic aircraft. His knowledge of compressibility effects, due to shock waves appearing in the flow, showed that there were no insuperable obstacles, so long as great care was taken at just below the speed of sound. Slim profiles would generate only weak shock waves, and the boundary layers would not be slowed down too rapidly, to produce the dreaded "shock stall".

These ideas led to the concept of the Lightning as a supersonic fighter plane:

We believe that the initiative came from Ray Creasey to think that supersonic flight was feasible (...) the personal contributions of Ray Creasey to the concept of the Lightning, and the importance of this story to the emergence of Warton as a leading design group can not be overstated.

Ollie Heath, who was a member of the Lightning design team and later rose to the role of Director of Advanced Engineering, also believed that Ray Creasey had made the greatest contribution to the design of the Lightning:

Who was responsible for the Lightning? Many of the concepts were those of the late Ray Creasey, who was a brilliant aerodynamicist.

A BAE Heritage Department booklet describes Ray Creasey's contribution to the aerodynamic design of the Lightning in some detail

=== BAC ===
In his role as Director of Engineering at BAC and his later role as Director of Advanced Systems and Technology, Ray Creasey initiated many other projects and produced the early design for many other aircraft and systems:

During the second phase of English Electric's history, that is from mid 1945, most project work was the responsibility of R F Creasey. In addition, he often had responsibility for many other departments.

Projects included the TSR2 (notoriously cancelled); the Tornado; and the Typhoon.

TSR2 grew from Ray's ideas, a short-span wing with heavy wing loading, for low-level ground attack, then with a blown flap to give a reasonable landing run.

The patent relating to the early design work of the TSR2, patent no. 873,679, was not published until July 1961, because of security restrictions and the application was made on behalf of the configuration's earliest inventors, R.F. Creasey, B.O. Heath and G.F. Sharples. An account by A T F Simmons of the early stages of design, and Ray Creasey's involvement, is included in the proceedings of the seminar held at Filton in April 1997 to consider the history and lessons of the TSR2 project, published by the Royal Air Force Historical Society.

Frank Dickson, who later became Managing Director of BAE Military Aircraft Division, described Ray Creasey as "an aerodynamic genius".

Before his early death in 1976 he had received a significant number of awards (see below) and a significant number of patents had been published in his name, as inventor (see below). His knowledge of design and aerodynamics had been recognized in the UK and also abroad. He had regularly been asked to comment on, and contribute to, various projects in the USA and elsewhere, including involvement in NASA's Space Shuttle Program.

== Personal life ==
Married in 1946, and had one daughter, born in 1948. He did not live to see the births of a granddaughter, who became a psychiatrist working for the NHS, and a grandson, who became a barrister. One of his uncles was the prolific crime writer John Creasey.

== Awards ==
- 1968 appointed OBE
- 1970 Fellow of the American Institute of Aeronautics and Astronautics for his "long and distinguished career as a leading aeronautical engineer and his work in the field of variable geometry".
- 1974 Royal Aeronautical Society's Silver Medal for his "work on future military aircraft assessment, including the broader aspects of operational analysis".
- 1976 NATO Award for "services rendered".

== Patents published in the UK ==
GB 635609A, Ellis, D L; Fowler, R G & Creasey, R F, "Improvements in and relating to wind tunnels", published 12 April 1950

GB 723390A, Creasey, R F & Fowler, R G, "Improvements in and relating to high lift devices for aircraft", published 9 February 1955

GB 728612A, Creasey, R F, "Improvements in and relating to ailerons for aircraft wings", published 20 April 1955

GB 737812A, Creasey, R F & Horsfield, W D, "Improvements in and relating to artificial feel systems for aircraft controls", published 5 October 1955

GB 846382A, Creasey, R F & Heath, B O, "Improvements in and relating to aircraft", published 31 August 1960

GB 873679A, Creasey, R F & Heath, B O, "Improvements in and relating to aircraft", published 26 July 1961

GB 890791A, Aspden, H & Creasey, R F, "Improvements in and relating to navigational aids", published 7 March 1962

GB 910350A, Creasey, R F & Heath, B O, "Improvements in and relating to aircraft wings incorporating power installations", published 14 November 1962

GB 926613A, Creasey, R F & Heath, B O, "Improvements in and relating to composite vertical take-off aircraft", published 22 May 1963

GB 979221A, Creasey, R F & Walley, G D, "Improvements in and relating to short or vertical take-off aircraft", issued 1 January 1965

GB 987792A, Creasey, R F & Burgin, K, "Improvements in and relating to aircraft wings", published 31 March 1965

Most of the patents listed above were applied for and published in a number of other countries, notably the US, Canada and Germany. Many of the patents issued in his name were classified at the time, for reasons of national security, and it is unclear whether all of them were eventually de-classified and/or publicly published, and therefore whether the list above is complete. See also an article published in the New Scientist in respect of UK patents and secrecy orders. Most of the papers he wrote were also classified for reasons of national security.

== See also ==
- Aerospace industry in the United Kingdom
