= Martin-Baker Mk.5 =

Mk.5
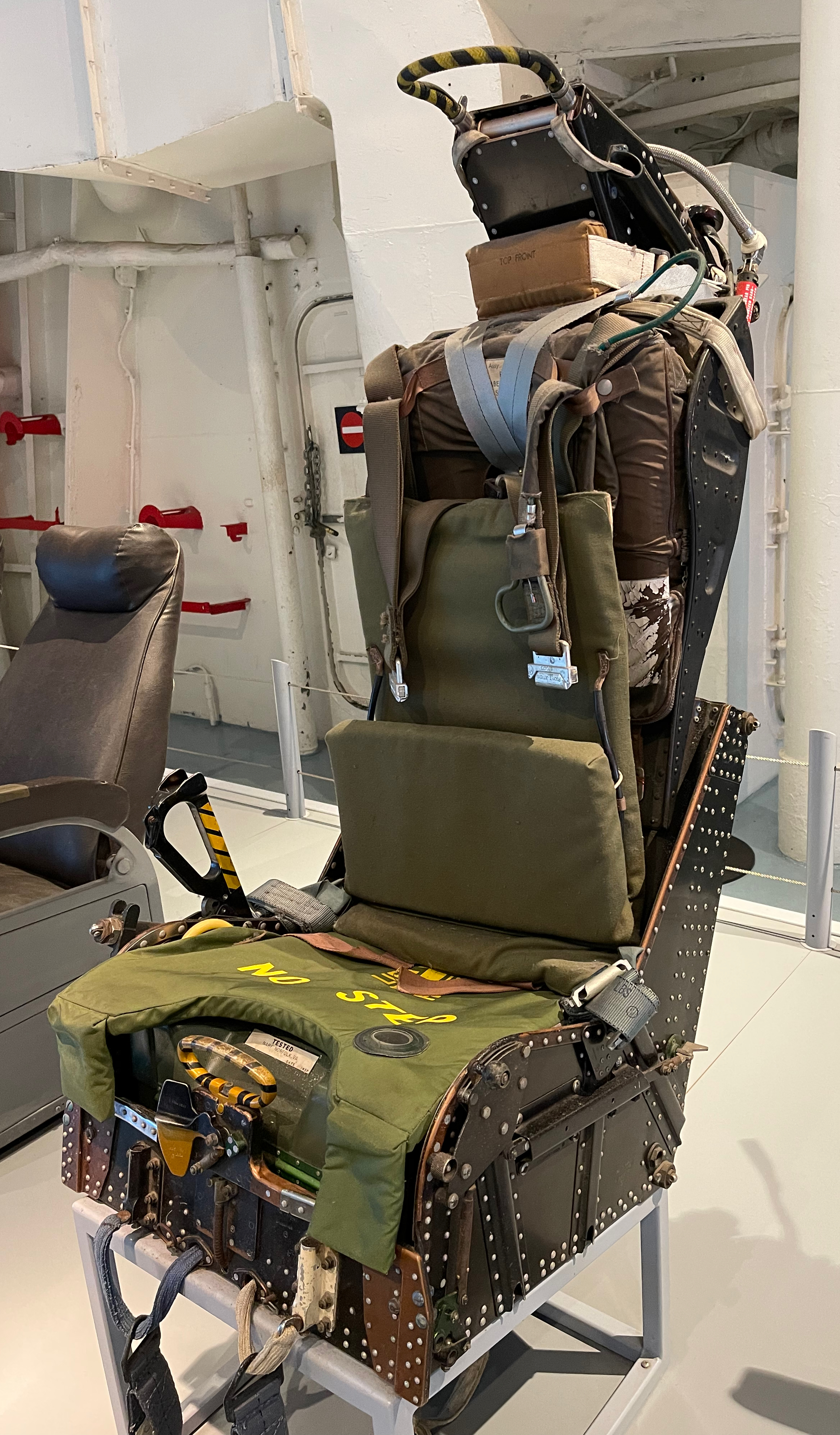

The Martin-Baker Mk.5 is a British ejection seat designed and built by Martin-Baker. Introduced in the late 1950s, the Mk.5 has been installed in combat and training aircraft worldwide.

== History ==
The Mk.5 seat was developed alongside the Mk.4 design to meet the needs of the United States Navy. Compared to the Mk.4 seat the structure and harnesses were strengthened to withstand higher crash landing loads, this resulted in a slight increase in weight. Canopy breaking horns were added to allow ejection through an unjettisoned canopy. Two aircraft types operated by the Royal Norwegian Air Force, the RF-84F Thunderflash and the F-86D Sabre, were retro-fitted with Mk.5 seats at the Martin-Baker company's home airfield at Chalgrove.

== Operation sequence ==
Operating either the seat pan or face blind firing handles initiates aircraft canopy jettison, the main gun located at the rear of the seat then fires, the main gun is a telescopic tube with two explosive charges that fire in sequence. As the seat moves up its guide rails an emergency oxygen supply is activated and personal equipment tubing and communication leads are automatically disconnected, leg restraints also operate.

A steel rod, known as the drogue gun, is fired and extracts two small parachutes to stabilise the seat's descent path. A barostatic mechanism prevents the main parachute from opening above an altitude of 10,000 ft (3,000 m) A time delay mechanism operates the main parachute below this altitude in conjunction with another device to prevent the parachute opening at high speed. The seat then separates from the occupant for a normal parachute descent, a manual separation handle and ripcord is provided should the automatic system fail.

== Applications ==
The Mk.5 ejection seat has been installed in the following aircraft types:
List from Martin-Baker.

- Dassault Mirage III
- Douglas F4D Skyray
- Hawker P.1121 - Intended application
- Grumman A-6 Intruder
- Grumman F-11 Tiger
- Grumman OV-1 Mohawk
- Lockheed T-33 Shooting Star
- Lockheed TRV-1 SeaStar
- McDonnell F3H Demon
- McDonnell Douglas F-4 Phantom (UK variants)
- North American FJ-4 Fury
- North American F-86D Sabre
- North American F-100 Super Sabre
- Republic F-84F Thunderstreak/RF-84F Thunderflash
- Vought F-8 Crusader

== Specifications (Mk.5) ==
- Maximum operating height: 50,000 ft (15,240 m)
- Minimum operating height: Ground level
- Minimum operating speed: 90 knots indicated airspeed (KIAS)
- Maximum operating speed: 600 KIAS
