= Lionel Preston =

Royal Navy Admiral (1875–1971)

Admiral Sir Lionel Preston KCB
- Born: 27 September 1875
- Died: 21 September 1971 (aged 95)
- Military career
- Allegiance: United Kingdom
- Branch: Royal Navy
- Service years: 1888–1935; 1939–1945
- Rank: Admiral
- Commands: Imperial Defence College (1933–35); 3rd Cruiser Squadron (1926–29); HMS Eagle (1923–25); HMS Lupin (1916–17); HMS Hollyhock (1915–16); HMS Skipjack (1914–15); HMS Jason (1913–14); HMS Highflyer (1913); HMS Swiftsure (1913); HMS Wolverine (1910–12); HMS Tartar (1910); HMS Bruizer (1905–07)
- Conflicts: Boxer Rebellion; First World War; Second World War
- Awards: Knight Commander of the Order of the Bath; Mentioned in Despatches; Legion of Honour (France)

Admiral Sir Lionel George Preston, KCB (27 September 1875 – 21 September 1971) was a senior Royal Navy officer who served as Fourth Sea Lord from 1930 to 1932.

== Naval career ==
Lionel Preston was educated at Stubbington House School and joined the Royal Navy as a cadet aboard HMS Prince of Wales in 1888. He was posted to the sloop HMS Rosario in March 1900, and took part in the response to the Boxer Rebellion after the ship was posted to the China Station in June that year. He was appointed 1st lieutenant on the surveying ship HMS Hearty on 30 May 1902. During the First World War he commanded the Grand Fleet Minesweeping Flotilla from 1914 until 1917, when he became director of the Minesweeping Division at the Admiralty.

After the war Preston was in charge of the clearance of mines in British waters and then, from 1919, commanded patrol, minesweeping training and fishing protection flotilla. He was appointed commanding officer of the Royal Navy Signal School at Portsmouth in 1920 and then given command of the aircraft carrier HMS Eagle in 1923. He was given command of the 3rd Cruiser Squadron in 1926 and became Fourth Sea Lord and Chief of Supplies and Transport in 1930. He was made Commandant of the Imperial Defence College in 1933 and, after being promoted to full admiral on 1 March 1934, he retired in 1935.

Preston also served in the Second World War as advisor on minesweeping and then, as the director of small vessels pool, he took charge of the provision of small craft for Dunkirk evacuation in 1940. In a "War Commentary" broadcast by the BBC he made reference to "the futile years" when the United Kingdom supported the League of Nations as a basis for its foreign policy. He retired again in 1945.

== Later life ==
In retirement Preston became Chairman of Titanine Limited, a business specialising in aircraft finishes. He lived in Chiltern Road in Dunstable.

Preston also wrote the book Sea And River Painters of the Netherlands in the Seventeenth Century.

== Family ==
Preston married twice. His first wife was Emily Elizabeth Bryant, daughter of Edgar Bryant. They had a son born in 1902.

Military offices
| Preceded by Sir Vernon Haggard | Fourth Sea Lord; 1930–1932 | Succeeded by Sir Geoffrey Blake |
| Preceded by Sir Robert Brooke-Popham | Commandant of the Imperial Defence College; 1933–1935 | Succeeded by Sir Robert Haining |
