= Titanine Ltd. =

Aviation coating originally manufactured in Newcastle-upon-Tyne, UK

- Formerly: British Aeroplane Varnish Co.,
- Industry: Aviation
- Founded: 1915
- Headquarters: Felling-on-Tyne
- Key people: Theodore W. Holzapfel
- Products: manufacturers of varnish, dope, paint, and other compositions for application on aircraft

Titanine was an aviation coatings (Aircraft dope) originally manufactured by Holzapfels, Ltd., of Newcastle, at their Felling-on-Tyne works, where they had been carrying on business as manufacturers of anti-corrosive paints and varnishes for marine purposes. Titanine continues to be manufactured in a range of paints and coatings used in the aviation industry, including a range of military colours.

== History ==
In 1881, the German brothers Max and Albert Holzapfel, and Charles Petrie founded the Holzapfel Compositions Company Ltd., in Newcastle upon Tyne, UK, producing marine coatings for the local shipping industry. The name International was then coined as their paint brand. The company expanded for many years, moving first to larger premised Gateshead, and in 1904 to a large factory in Felling-on-Tyne, where the 21st century headquarters are still located.

Holzapfels, Ltd. transferred their interests in Titanine, a new dope to the British Aeroplane Varnish Co. Ltd., with Theodore W. Holzapfel, as managing director. The chief advantage claimed for Titanine was that it was neither tetrachloride nor a spirit derivative of chlorine, nor was amyl acetate used in its composition. Approximately 1,000,000 gallons of titanine were manufactured during the First World War.

Titanine, Incorporated (Union City, New Jersey) was a subsidiary company opened in the United States to serve the American aircraft industry. Other plants were opened in Italy and Germany in the years before the Second World War. The company went on to produce a range of paints and coatings used in the aviation industry including a range of military colours.

In 1947, the Titanine company was instrumental in the insolvency proceedings taken against the Miles Aircraft Co of Reading, England which led to that company being wound up.

In the 1950s, Titanine were one of the manufacturers for anti-flash white used on nuclear bombers, the Handley Page Victor in particular. This increasing demand led to an increase in profits for Titanine, from £40,000 (nett) in 1952 to a post-war record £82,000 in 1953. Similar paints would go on to be used for the developing civil aircraft fleets of the 1960s.

== Timeline ==
  - 1915: Company founded as British Aeroplane Varnish Company] Ltd.
  - 1918: Name changed to Titanine Ltd.
  - 1921: Acquired British Emaillite Co. Ltd.; name changed to Titanine-Emaillite Ltd.
  - 1936: Public company founded to acquire Titanine-Emaillite Ltd., then in voluntary liquidation.
    - Dufay Titanine formed.
  - 1962: Company acquired Modern Industrial Finishes Ltd.
    - DeSoto Inc., of Des Plaines, Illinois, purchased a 50% interest in Dufay Titanine plc for £4m.
