= BAC TSR-2 =

British reconnaissance strike aircraft prototype

TSR-2
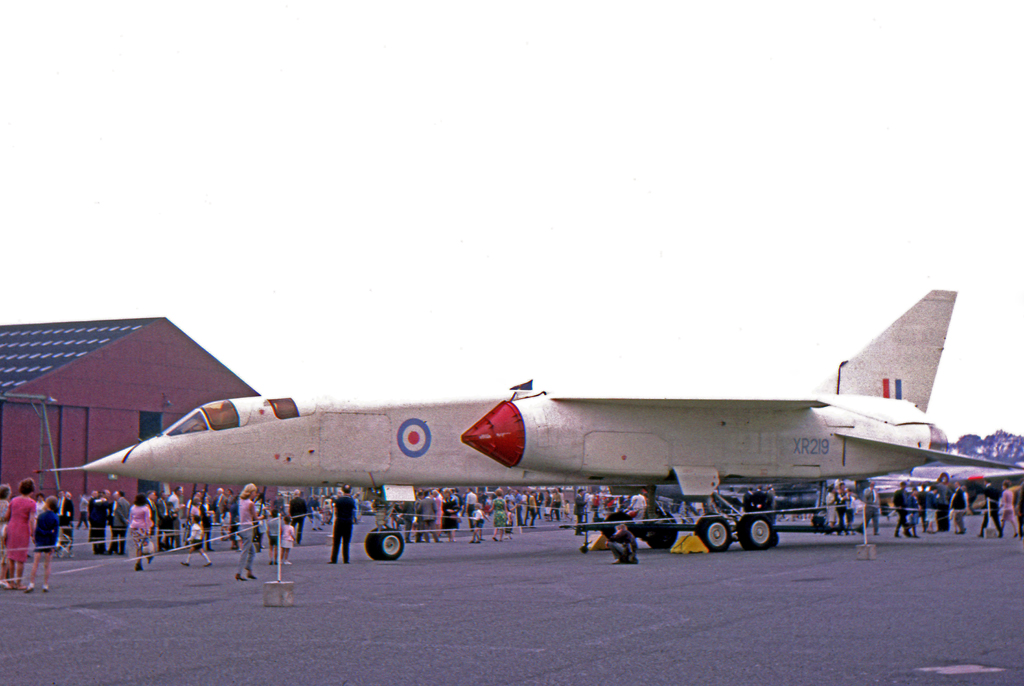
- The only TSR-2 to fly, XR219 in anti-flash white finish, at BAC's Warton factory in 1966

General information
- Type: Strike/reconnaissance
- National origin: United Kingdom
- Manufacturer: British Aircraft Corporation
- Status: Cancelled
- Number built: 3

History
- First flight: 27 September 1964

The British Aircraft Corporation TSR-2 was a cancelled supersonic strike and reconnaissance aircraft designed by the British Aircraft Corporation (BAC). It was under development throughout the late 1950s and early 1960s for the Royal Air Force (RAF); the TSR-2 designation came from "Tactical Strike and Reconnaissance, Mach 2".

The TSR-2 arose from the issuing of General Operational Requirement 339 (GOR.339) in November 1956, which sought a successor to the English Electric Canberra that would perform both conventional and tactical nuclear weapons delivery, be able to penetrate well-defended frontline areas at low altitudes and very high speeds, and attack high-value targets in rear areas. Another intended combat role was to provide high-altitude, high-speed stand-off, side-looking radar and photographic imagery and signals intelligence, aerial reconnaissance. On 1 January 1959, the project received its official go-ahead; early work was undertaken by Vickers-Armstrong in cooperation with English Electric, before Britain's aircraft industry underwent consolidation to create BAC. However, as some contributing manufacturers were employed directly by the Ministry rather than through BAC, this led to communication difficulties and cost overruns. On 27 September 1964, test pilot Roland Beamont performed the type's maiden flight.

Only one example flew and test flights and weight increases during design indicated that the aircraft would be unable to meet its original stringent design specifications. (Note: Approximately 14 hours of flight testing were completed on airframe XR219 before the programme was cancelled, with the development phase not fully completed.) The design specifications were reduced as the result. The decision to cancel the TSR-2 programme came about out of ever-rising costs and inter-service rivalry over Britain's future defence needs. It was decided to order an adapted version of the General Dynamics F-111 instead, but that decision was also later rescinded as costs and development times of that aircraft increased as well. Operationally, the roles intended for the TSR-2 were taken up by other aircraft, such as the Blackburn Buccaneer and McDonnell Douglas F-4 Phantom II, both of which had been considered and rejected early in the TSR-2 procurement process. Eventually, the smaller swing-wing Panavia Tornado was developed by a European consortium and introduced during the 1980s to fulfil broadly similar requirements to the TSR-2.

== Background ==
=== Previous designs ===
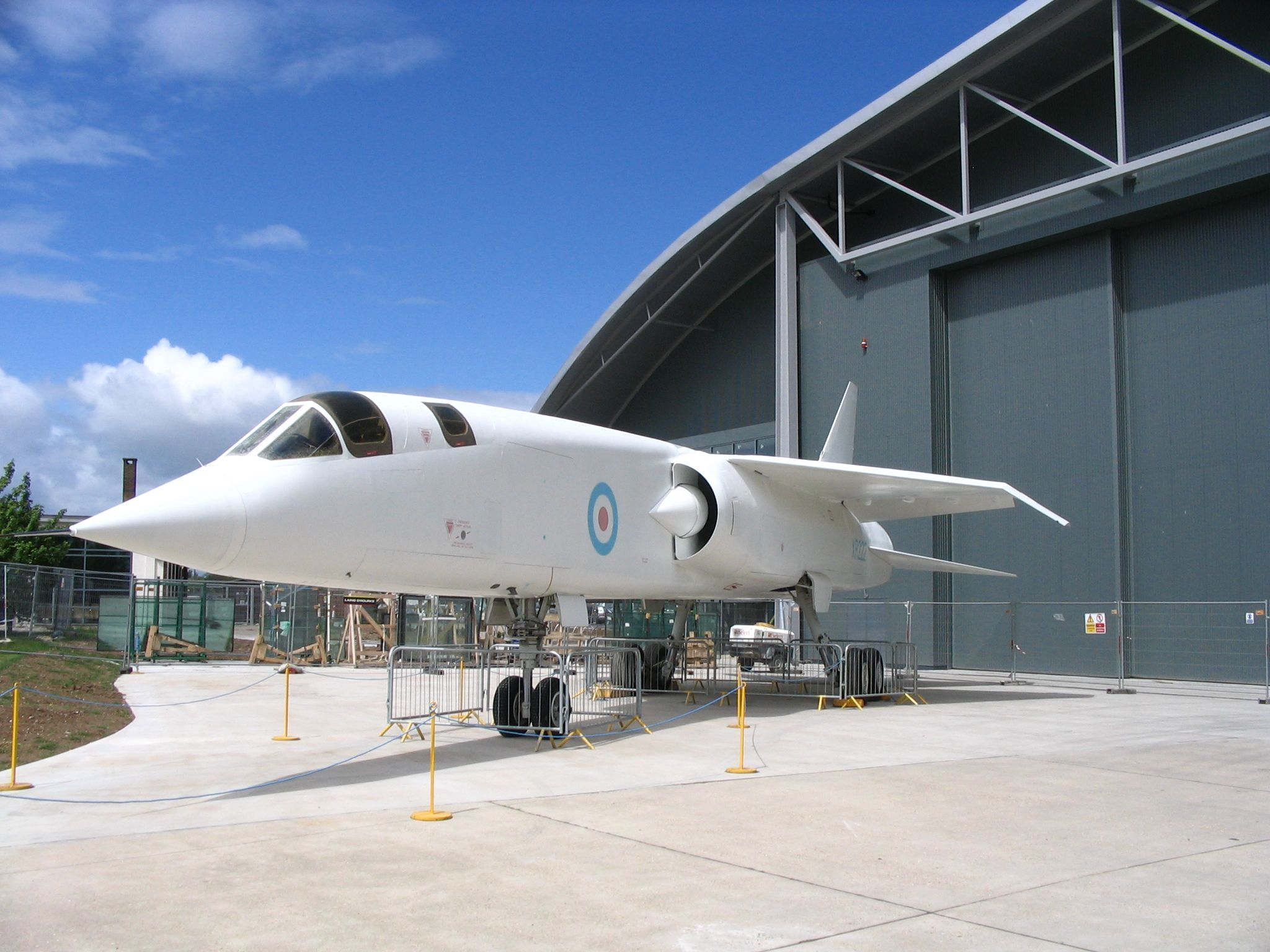
XR222 in white anti-flash finish, worn by all the completed TSR-2s, at Duxford, 2006

The introduction of the first jet engines in the late-World War II period led to calls for new jet-powered versions of existing aircraft. Among these was the design of a replacement for the de Havilland Mosquito, at that time among the world's leading medium bombers. The Mosquito had been designed with reduced weight to improve its speed. This led to the removal of all defensive armament, improving performance to the point where it was unnecessary. This approach was extremely successful, and a jet-powered version would be even more difficult to intercept.

This led to Air Ministry specification E.3/45. The winning design, the English Electric Canberra, also dispensed with defensive armament, producing a design with the speed and altitude that allowed it to fly past most defences. The design's large wings gave it the lift needed to operate at very high altitudes, placing it above the range where jet fighters could intercept it. The Canberra could fly over its enemy with relative impunity, making it suited to aerial reconnaissance missions. The design was so successful that it was licensed for production in the United States, one of very few such cases. The Martin RB-57D and RB-57F American-built reconnaissance subtypes further extended the wings up to a 37.5 m (123 ft) span for extremely high altitude capabilities.

=== Canberra replacement ===
It was realised that the Canberra's advantages would be eroded by improvements in enemy interceptor aircraft. As early as 22 February 1952, Air Vice Marshal Geoffrey Tuttle wrote that "Frankly, I do not believe that we will get much operational value out of the Canberra from 1955 onwards... the aircraft is already out of date and I doubt its chances of survival in daylight against the present MiG-15 opposition." As the Canberra's performance appeared to be at its limit, this led to a March 1952 draft requirement for a new light bomber to replace it, but this never went anywhere.

A second round of development began after a January 1953 memo noted that the "thin wing" version of the Gloster Javelin could be modified to be a light bomber. The Javelin had an advanced navigation system that would be useful in this role. This led to operational requirement OR.328, but this was rejected as the range was too small when it was flown at low altitude. English Electric then began work on a Royal Navy requirement for a low-altitude strike aircraft, which was won by Blackburn with the Buccaneer. With minor changes, English Electric submitted their Navy entry to the RAF for the same role as OR.328. This was reviewed in October 1955, along with the winning Blackburn design, and rejected. Matthew Slattery stated that further redesign was needed to make them useful by the time they might enter service around 1960, concluding "it seems quite wrong to introduce in 1960 a subsonic aircraft that stands no hope of being supersonic."

Meanwhile, the Canberra was still proving useful in spite of new Soviet interceptors, but the widespread introduction of the first of the Soviet Union's surface-to-air missiles (SAMs) in the late 1950s was a major threat. SAMs had speed and altitude performance much greater than any contemporary aircraft. The Canberra, and other high-altitude aircraft like the British V bombers or US Boeing B-52 Stratofortress, were extremely vulnerable to these weapons. The first aircraft to fall victim to the Soviet S-75 Dvina (NATO name "SA-2 Guideline") SAM was a Taiwanese RB-57 shot down in 1959.

The solution was to fly lower: since radar operates in line-of-sight, the curvature of the Earth renders low-flying aircraft invisible beyond a certain range, the radar horizon. In practice, trees, hills, valleys and any other obstructions reduce this range even more, making a ground-based interception of low-flying aircraft extremely difficult. The Canberra was designed for medium- to high-altitude flight and was not suitable for continuous terrain-hugging flight. Low-level strike aircraft, or "interdictors", grew into a new class during the late 1950s. They generally had a high wing loading to reduce the effects of turbulence and cross-wind, some form of terrain-following radar to allow very low flight at high speeds, and large fuel loads to offset the higher fuel use at low altitudes.

=== GOR.339 ===
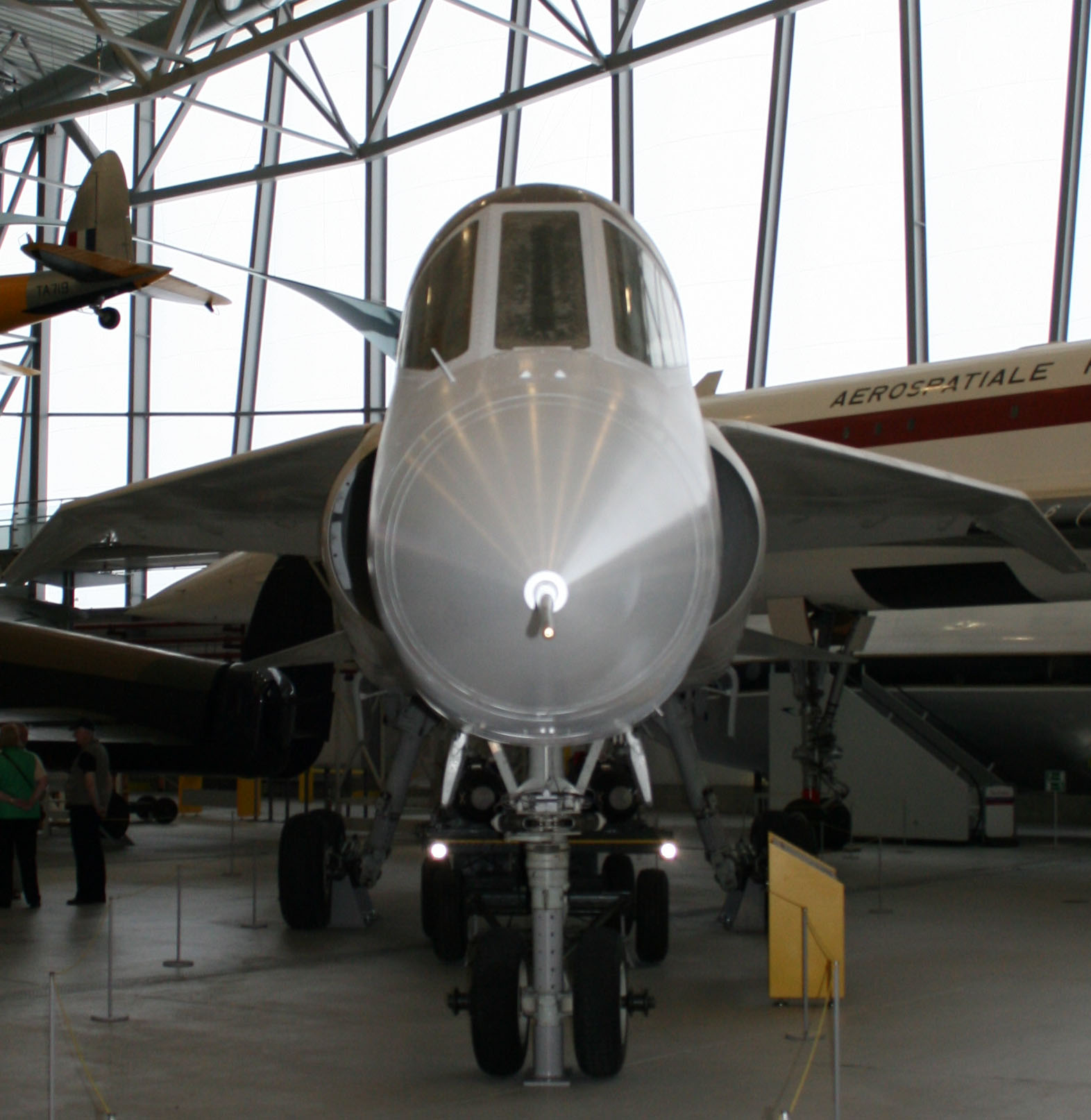
TSR-2 XR222 photographed at Duxford, 2009

Aware of the changing operational environment, the Ministry of Supply started work with English Electric in 1955, attempting to define a new light bomber to replace the Canberra. These early studies eventually settled on an aircraft with a 2,000 nmi (2,300 mi; 3,700 km) ferry range, Mach 1.5 speed "at altitude" and 600 nmi (690 mi; 1,100 km) low-level range. A crew of two was required, one being the operator of the advanced navigational and attack equipment. The bombload was to be four 1,000 lb (450 kg) bombs.

The requirements were made official in November 1956 with General Operational Requirement 339 (GOR.339), which was issued to various aircraft manufacturers in March 1957. This requirement was ambitious for the technology of the day, requiring a supersonic all-weather aircraft that could deliver nuclear weapons over a long range, operate at high level at Mach 2+ or low level at Mach 1.2, with STOL or possible VTOL performance. The latter requirement was a side-effect of common battle plans from the 1950s, which suggested that nuclear strikes in the opening stages of war would damage most runways and airfields, meaning that aircraft would need to take off from "rough fields" such as disused Second World War airfields, or even flat and open areas of land.

Specifically, the requirement included:

- Delivery of tactical nuclear weapons at low level in all weathers, by day and night
- Photo-reconnaissance at medium level (day) and low level (day and night)
- Electronic reconnaissance in all weather
- Delivery of tactical nuclear weapons day and night at medium altitudes using blind bombing if necessary
- Delivery of conventional bombs and rockets

Low level was stated to be under 1,000 ft (300 m) with an expected attack speed at sea level of Mach 0.95. The operational range was to be 1,000 nmi (1,200 mi; 1,900 km) operating off runways of no more than 3,000 ft (910 m). The TSR-2 was to be able to operate at 200 ft (60 m) above the ground at Mach 1.1; its range would allow it to operate strategically as well as tactically.

=== Political changes ===
"There are jobs that missiles cannot do, they cannot reconnoitre enemy positions, they cannot be moved rapidly from one theatre to another, nor can they be switched from one target to another, only a manned vehicle can produce such flexibility."

— Conservative Member of Parliament and former Minister for Aviation Julian Amery writing in Sunday Telegraph 1965

As this specification was being studied by various manufacturers, the first of the political storms that were to dog the project reared its head, when Defence Minister Duncan Sandys stated in the 1957 Defence White Paper that the era of manned combat was at an end and ballistic missiles were the weapons of the future. This viewpoint was vigorously debated by the aviation industry and within the Ministry of Defence for years. Senior RAF officers argued against the White Paper's premise, stating the importance of mobility, and that the TSR-2 could not only replace the Canberra, but potentially the entire V bomber force.

In addition to the argument over the need for manned aircraft, additional political machinations had the effect of complicating the project. In September 1957, the Ministry of Supply informed the heads of the aviation companies that the only acceptable proposals would be those issued from teams consisting of more than one company. There was a large number of competing aircraft manufacturing companies in the UK, while orders were decreasing; thus the government intended to foster cooperation between certain companies and encourage mergers.

Another political matter that did not help was the mutual distrust between the various services. At the time that GOR.339 was being defined, the Royal Navy was proceeding with the Buccaneer. The savings associated with both forces using a common aircraft would be considerable, and Blackburn offered the RAF a version of the NA.39 — B.103A — to fit some of the GOR.339 requirements. The Chief of the Defence Staff and former First Sea Lord, Lord Mountbatten, was a loyal proponent of the Buccaneer, later claiming that five of the type could be purchased for the same price as one TSR-2. The RAF rebuffed the proposal, stating that it was unsuitable due to poor takeoff performance and the avionics not being capable of the desired role. As one RAF official put it, "If we show the slightest interest in NA.39 we might not get the GOR.339 aircraft."

Another political opponent of the TSR-2 project was Sir Solly Zuckerman, at the time the Chief Scientific Advisor to the Ministry of Defence. Zuckerman had a low opinion of British technological achievements and was in favour of procuring military hardware from the United States.

=== Submissions ===
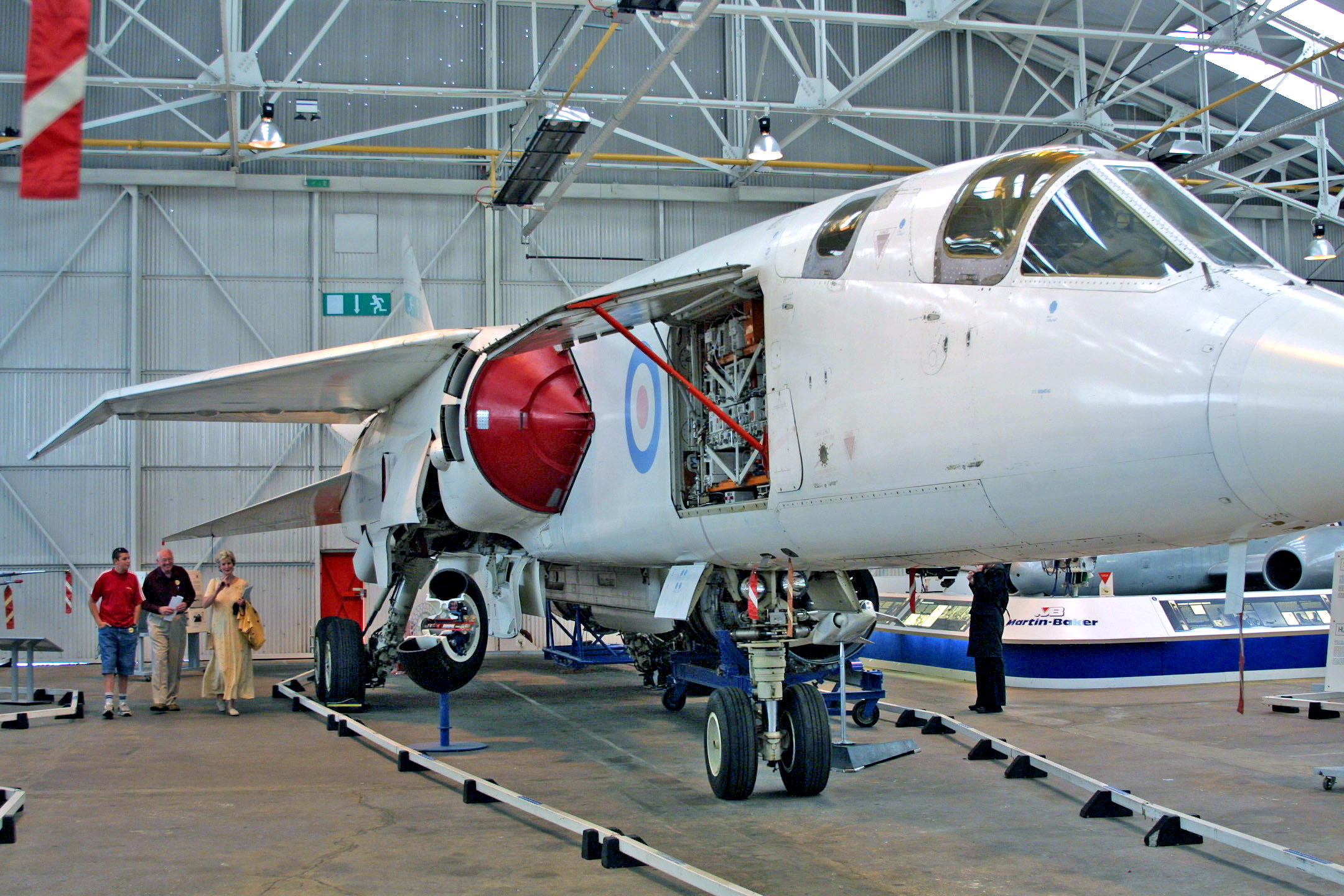
TSR-2 XR220 at RAF Museum Cosford, 2002, with open access panel revealing interior details

English Electric and Hawker Aircraft had already received some signals from the Air Ministry that a formal process would be starting, but all of the major manufacturers were able to quickly put together submissions:

- Blackburn entered B.103A, which was essentially a B.103/NA.39 (Buccaneer) with its naval equipment removed and new fuel tanks installed.
- De Havilland entered an upgraded version of the de Havilland Sea Vixen, the "DH.110 Tactical Bomber', modified to remove naval systems and increase fuel through a fuselage extension. It also added an upgraded version of the Rolls-Royce Avon engines, blown flaps, and an attachment point for an under-fuselage rocket engine JATO unit, all to improve takeoff performance.
- Vickers-Armstrongs/Supermarine offered Type 565, a similar conversion of the Supermarine Scimitar.
- Hawker (Note: Hawker's parent, Hawker-Siddeley, was also the parent of Avro. HS acquired de Havilland and Blackburn in 1960.) entered the P.1121, a development of the Hawker Hunter relying on drop tanks to meet the range requirements.

These early submissions were reviewed in May 1957. While all of these would be available before the desired 1964 service entry date, all of them had performance that was far short of the requirements. Only de Havilland's entry met the 1,000 nautical miles (1,900 km; 1,200 mi) range requirement; the others were well short, especially P.1121. The supersonic performance of all of these designs was very limited, especially the range the aircraft could fly whilst supersonic.

A further and more rigorous GOR.339 was released, and at a September 1957 meeting the Ministry called for a new round of submissions on 31 January 1958, making the first formal statement that only those submissions from paired-up companies would be considered. Eight companies were invited to enter, leading to thirteen submissions:

- Avro's 739 looked very similar to the final TSR-2, although it had a mid-mounted swept wing instead of top-mounted delta. It is otherwise very similar to the EE submission, especially in details of the cockpit area.
- Blackburn entered B.108, a further modification of B.103A with even more fuel. While the performance was limited compared to the other entries, Blackburn felt that meeting all of these features was not justified and their model would cost far less per unit. They also felt that, through the experimental development of Buccaneer, they were the only company that really had experience with the low-level attack profile and its many problems in terms of turbulence and control.
- Bristol's Type 204 was the most distinctive entry, using their "gothic" version of the delta wing planform, which they had developed during early studies on Bristol Type 223. It also featured a canard under the cockpit area, below the fuselage and mounted on a wing-like extension. The two engines were fed from an intake on the top of the wing.
- De Havilland entered an entirely new design, unnamed, with swept wings and engines under the wings in pods. They offered a rocket-powered pad for VTOL use, and also offered modified versions for naval strike and long-range interceptors.
- English Electric, having been informed of the upcoming requirements, had time to study 18 proposed layouts, P.1 to P.18, before selecting P.17A for submission. This was substantially similar to the winning design, differing primarily in the type of engine intakes used. EE teamed up with Short Brothers for the Shorts P.17D, a vertical-lift platform that would give the P.17 a VTOL capability.
- Fairey entered a design based on the Fairey Delta 2, essentially stretching the fuselage forward and adding a large canard at the cockpit area. The two engines would be carried in underwing pods; this precluded underwing stores, but had a large bomb bay in the fuselage.
- Gloster entered two more versions of the thin-wing Javelin, either with in-fuselage engines like the Javelin, or with underwing pods that allowed for greater internal stores of fuel and weapons.
- Hawker entered three closely related designs: P.1123, P.1125 and P.1129. The first two shared as many components as possible to deliver a light bomber (1123) or air superiority fighter (1125). The P.1129 was similar but larger and more powerful, meeting all of the GOR requirements.
- Vickers, having dropped the Supermarine name, entered Type 571. This looked similar to the winning submission, but featured a very thin and only slightly swept wing with large wingtip fuel tanks, and prominent swept-forward Ferri-style engine intakes.

=== Selection ===
By February, the Air Ministry had reduced the field to three designs: Hawker-Siddeley, Vickers and EE. The Ministry was highly impressed with the Vickers submission, which included not only the aircraft design, but a "total systems concept" outlining all the avionics, support facilities and logistics needed to maintain the aircraft in the field. EE, who had recently introduced the Lightning, was the only company with extensive experience with real-world supersonic aircraft, which they felt gave it a huge advantage in practical terms.

Hawker-Siddeley, parent of Hawker, Avro and Gloster, had entered five designs. This led to some confusion and internal dissent within the company. Avro, having lost the Avro 730 project, felt that a new bomber design was naturally theirs to lead. Gloster's design remained based on Javelin, and on 11 December 1957, the Hawker design team stated flatly there was no way it would ever win the contract. A 27 January 1958 meeting between Roy Dodson, Frank Spriggs and J.R. Ewins eventually decided to promote the P.1129 as their primary submission, with some added features from the 739. Notably, the wing was made thinner and the area rule was applied to optimize the design for flight at Mach 1.34.

In May, the Air Ministry issued OR.343, a refined version of GOR.339. Hawker submitted their updated "P.1129 Development", while minor variations of the other two designs were offered. Given the similarities between the Vickers and EE, there was some discussion of awarding another series of proposals, one from Vickers and EE and the other from Hawker-Siddeley, but it was noted this would delay the final contract by as much as a year.

It was later revealed that the decision to drop the Hawker effort had been taken as early as August, and that their later submissions were effectively a "going through the motions" effort. Official opinions of EE's management found it lacking in comparison to Vickers, but the combination of the two was felt by officialdom to be a useful marriage and accordingly the development contract was awarded to Vickers, with English Electric as sub-contractor. The ultimate design was essentially the wings and tail sections of the P.17, combined with the longer fuselage of the Type 571, with the design being built in two parts, Vickers the front and EE the rear, and the bolted together at a point just in front of the wing.

The existence of GOR.339 was revealed to the public in December 1958 in a statement to the House of Commons. Under pressure by the recommendations of the Committee on Estimates, the Air Ministry examined ways that the various project proposals could be combined, and on 1 January 1959, the Minister of Supply announced that the TSR-2 would be built by Vickers-Armstrong working with English Electric; the initials coming from "Tactical Strike and Reconnaissance, Mach 2", the 'Strike' part of the designation specifically referring in RAF terminology to a nuclear weapons role.

On 1 January 1959, the project was given an official go-ahead; in February, it came under the new designation Operational Requirement 343. OR.343 was more specific and built upon work from the various submissions to GOR.339, specifically stating that low-level operations would be at 200 ft (61 m) or less, and that Mach 2 should be attained at altitude.

=== Mission ===
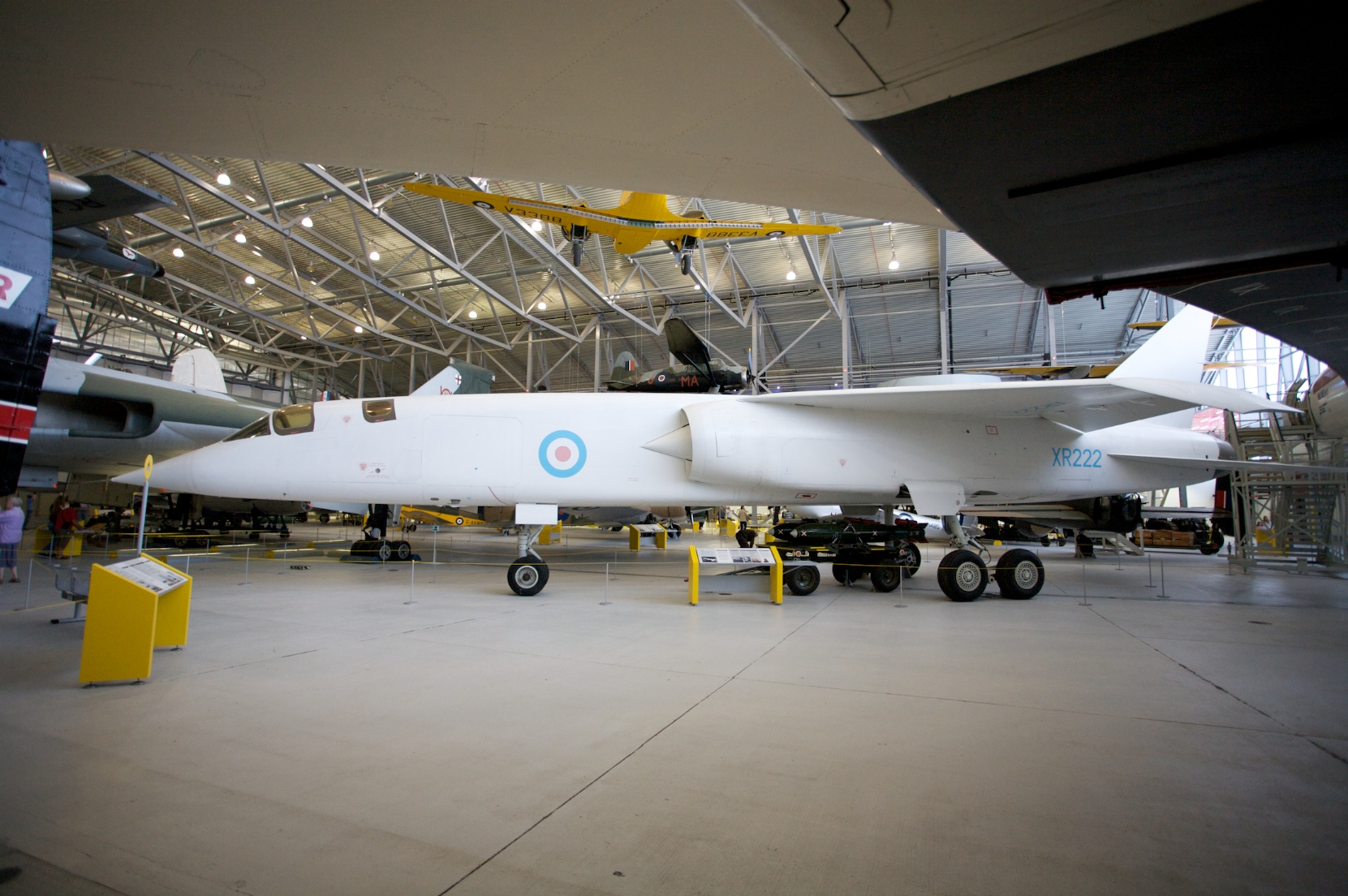
TSR-2 XR222 photographed at Duxford, 2009

The envisaged "standard mission" for the TSR-2 was to carry a 2,000 lb (910 kg) weapon internally for a combat radius of 1,000 nautical miles (1,200 mi; 1,900 km). Of that mission 100 nautical miles (120 mi; 190 km) was to be flown at higher altitudes at Mach 1.7 and the 200 nmi (230 mi; 370 km) into and out of the target area was to be flown as low as 200 ft at a speed of Mach 0.95. The remainder of the mission was to be flown at Mach 0.92. If the entire mission were to be flown at the low 200 ft altitude, the mission radius was reduced to 700 nmi (810 mi; 1,300 km). Heavier weapons loads could be carried with further reductions in range. Plans for increasing the TSR-2's range included fitting external tanks: one 450-imperial-gallon (540 US gal; 2,000 L) tank under each wing or one 1,000 imp gal (1,200 US gal; 4,500 L) tank carried centrally below the fuselage. If no internal weapons were carried, a further 570 imp gal (680 US gal; 2,600 L) could be carried in a tank in the weapons bay. Later variants were to be fitted with variable-geometry wings.

Planned flight profiles as of 3 December 1963 (Note: Ranges based on 2,000 lb weapon carried internally and retained throughout flight. Normal fuel reserves included)
Profile	Fuel load	Altitude	Speed (Mach No.)	Distance	Still air time	Notes
Economic cruise	Max internal	23,000 ft (7,000 m) – 35,000 ft (11,000 m)	Mach 0.92	2,780 miles (4,470 km)	5 h, 5 min	.
Economic cruise	Max internal plus 2 x 450 imp gal (2,000 L) wing tanks plus 1 x 1,000 imp gal (4,500 L) ventral tank	15,000 ft (4,600 m) – 35,000 ft (11,000 m)	M0.88–0.92	3,440 miles (5,540 km)	6 h, 20 min – 6 h, 35 min	Ventral tank still in design stage
Low-level cruise	Max internal	200 ft (61 m) above ground level	M0.90	1,580 nautical miles (2,930 km)	2 h, 40 min	
Low-level cruise	Max internal and 2 x 450 imp gal (2,000 L) wing tanks plus 1 x 1,000 imp gal (4,500 L) ventral tank	200 ft (61 m) above ground level	M0.90	2,060 miles (3,320 km)	3 h, 30 min	
Supersonic cruise	Max internal	50,000 ft (15,000 m) – 58,000 ft (18,000 m)	M2.00	1,000 miles (1,600 km)	53 min	Climbs and descents will be at less than M2.0; fuselage and engines limited to 45 min at M2.0

Bomb release procedure
Mode of delivery	Altitude	Speed	Notes
Laydown	100 ft (30 m) – 500 ft (150 m)	M0.80–1.15	5 mins at M1.15. 2 mins at 1.20M. Initial clearance using automatic system will be at 200 ft (61 m) and M0.9. Minimum height for laydown will depend on weapon.
Loft	100 ft (30 m) – 500 ft (150 m)	M0.80M-1.15	Release at 30°, 65° or 110°. Initial clearance will be at 200 ft (61 m) and 0.90M.
Ballistic	5,000 ft (1,500 m) – 55,000 ft (17,000 m)	M1.15 up to M2.05 (depending on height)	Initial clearance will be at 25,000 ft (7,600 m) and M1.70
Dive toss	Commence manoeuvre at 25,000 ft (7,600 m) – 50,000 ft (15,000 m)	Commence manoeuvre at M1.70–2.00	Dive angles between 12.5° and 22.5°. Aircraft speed at release between M0.92 and 1.10. Height at release 5–13,000 ft. Initial clearance will be with dive commencing at 25,000 ft (7,600 m) and M1.70.
Retarded air burst			This was possible with the system but no clearance of this mode was sought initially.

The TSR-2 was also to be equipped with a reconnaissance pack in the weapons bay which included an optical linescan unit built by EMI, three cameras and a sideways-looking radar (SLR) to carry out the majority of its reconnaissance tasks. Unlike modern linescan units that use infrared imaging, the TSR-2's linescan would use daylight imaging or an artificial light source to illuminate the ground for night reconnaissance.

=== Tactical nuclear weapons ===
Carriage of the existing Red Beard tactical nuclear bomb had been specified at the beginning of the TSR-2 project, but it was quickly realised that Red Beard was unsuited to external carriage at supersonic speeds, had safety and handling limitations, and its 15 kt yield would be inadequate for the targets assigned. Instead, in 1959, a successor to Red Beard — an "Improved Kiloton Bomb" to a specification known as Operational Requirement 1177 (OR.1177) — was specified for the TSR-2. In the tactical strike role, the TSR-2 was expected to attack targets beyond the forward edge of the battlefield assigned to the RAF by NATO, day or night and in all weathers. These targets comprised missile sites — both hardened and soft — aircraft on airfields, runways, airfield buildings, airfield fuel installations and bomb stores, tank concentrations, ammunition and supply dumps, railways and railway tunnels, and bridges. OR.1177 specified 50, 100, 200 and 300 kt yields, assuming a circular error probable of 1,200 ft (370 m) and a damage probability of 0.8, and laydown delivery capability, with burst heights for targets from 0 to 10,000 ft (3,000 m) above sea level. Other requirements were a weight of up to 1,000 lb (450 kg), a length of up to 144 in (3.7 m), and a diameter up to 28 in (710 mm) (the same as Red Beard).

However, a ministerial ruling on 9 July 1962 decreed that all future tactical nuclear weapons should be limited to a yield of 10 kt. The RAF issued a new version of the OR.1177 specification, accepting the lower yield, while making provision in the design for it to be capable of adaptation later for a higher yield, in the event of the political restriction being lifted. Meanwhile, the RAF explored ways of compensating for the lower yield by including, in the specifications for both the bomb and TSR-2, provision for releasing the smaller weapons in salvos, dropping sticks of four of the revised OR.1177 — later named WE.177A — at 3,000 ft (914m) intervals to prevent the detonation of the first weapon destroying the succeeding ones before they could, in turn, detonate. This led to the requirement that the TSR-2 must be able to carry four WE.177As, two internally and two on external underwing stores pylons —the width of the TSR-2 bomb bay (originally designed to accommodate a single Red Beard weapon) necessitating reducing the diameter to 16.5 in (42 cm), the bomb's width and fin span being constrained by the need to fit two WE.177 bombs side-by-side in the aircraft's bomb bay. The requirement for stick bombing using nuclear weapons was soon dropped as larger yield bombs came back into favour.

A drawback of carrying WE.177 on external pylons was a limitation due to aerodynamic heating of the bomb's casing. WE.177A was limited to a maximum carriage time of five minutes at Mach 1.15 at low level on TSR-2; otherwise the bomb's temperature would rise above its permitted maximum. This would impose a severe operational restriction on TSR-2, as the aircraft was designed for Mach 1+ cruise at this height.

Nuclear stand-off missiles were also proposed for the TSR-2 early in development but were not proceeded with. These included an air-launched development of the Blue Water missile — carried underwing or semi-recessed in the bomb bay — and an air-launched ballistic missile referred to as Grand Slam with a warhead derived from that intended for the Skybolt missile and a range of 100 nmi (120 mi; 190 km). Conventional missiles were catered for instead, with the design originally centring on use of the AGM-12 Bullpup, moving on to favour the French AS-30, then settling on the new OR.1168 missile (which would become the TV-guided AJ-168 Martel).

After the cancellation of the TSR-2, the RAF eventually filled the tactical strike requirement using McDonnell F-4 Phantom IIs with US dual-key nuclear weapons, (Note: The "British" Phantoms were based on the F-4C and F-4J variants and retained the earlier series' capability of carrying nuclear arms on the centreline pylon.) but continued their attempts to get the 10 kt limit lifted. Development of WE.177A was delayed by several years because the Atomic Weapons Research Establishment (AWRE) at Aldermaston was inundated with work on other warhead developments. AWRE workload eased after completion of the Polaris missile warheads and work was able to resume on the WE.177A; deliveries to the RAF began in late 1971 for deployment on Buccaneers of RAF Germany, a year after WE.177A deliveries to the Royal Navy. Approval for high-yield tactical weapons was eventually gained in 1970, and by 1975 the RAF had WE.177C, which at almost 200 kt was a weapon very similar to what they had planned for the TSR-2 in 1959.

== Design ==
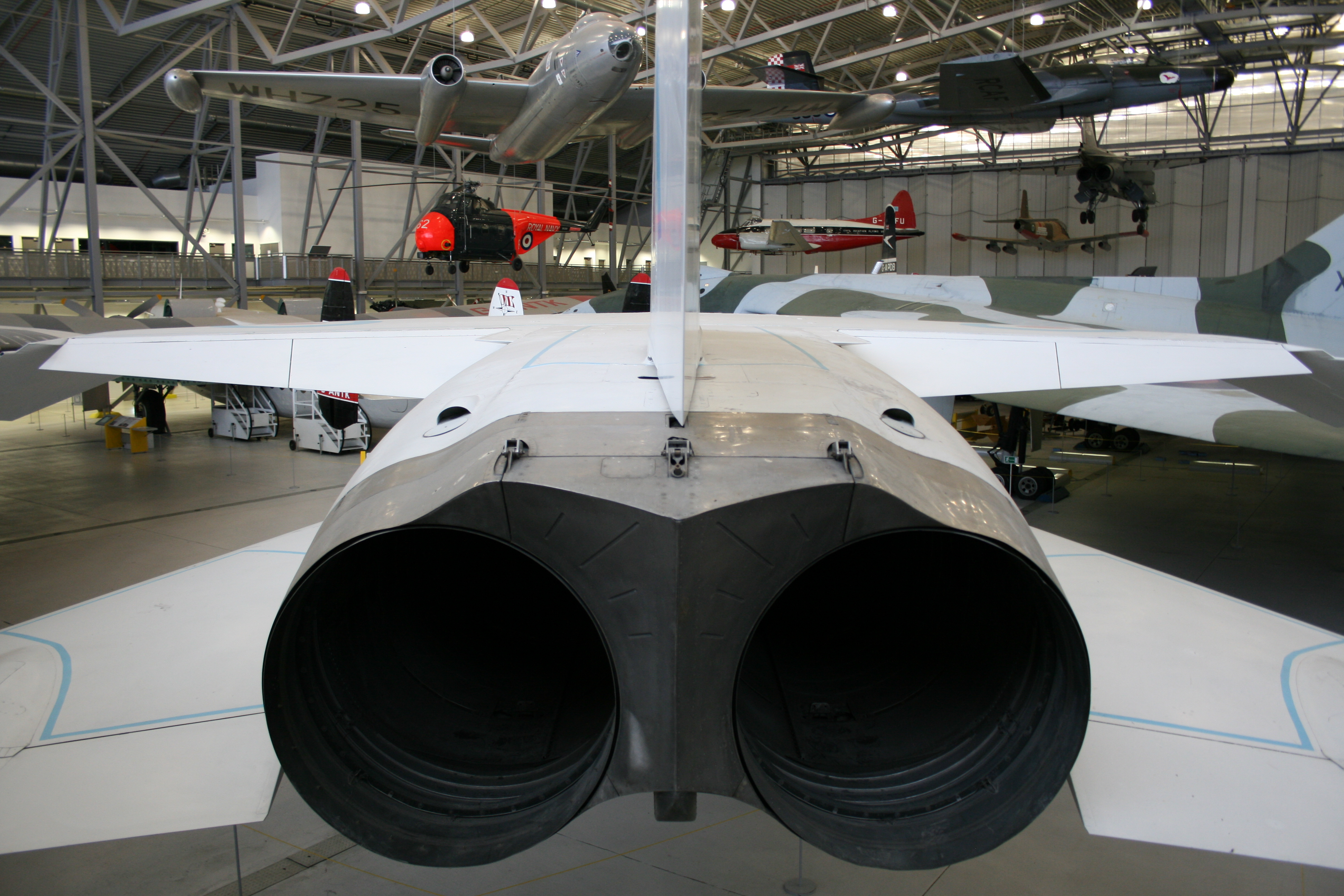
TSR-2 XR222 engine exhaust nozzles photographed at Duxford, 2009. The hinged panel in the centre above the engine nozzles contains the braking parachute

Throughout 1959, English Electric (EE) and Vickers worked on combining the best of both designs to propose a joint design with a view to having an aircraft flying by 1963, while also working on merging the companies under the umbrella of the British Aircraft Corporation. EE had put forward a delta winged design and Vickers, a swept wing on a long fuselage. The EE wing, born of their greater supersonic experience, was judged superior to Vickers, while the Vickers fuselage was preferred. In effect, the aircraft would be built 50/50: Vickers the front half, EE the rear.

The TSR-2 was to be powered by two Bristol-Siddeley Olympus reheated turbojets, advanced variants of those used in the Avro Vulcan. The Olympus would be further developed and would power the supersonic Concorde. The design featured a small shoulder-mounted delta wing with down-turned tips, an all-moving swept tailplane and a large all-moving fin. Blown flaps were fitted across the entire trailing edge of the wing to achieve the short takeoff and landing requirement, something that later designs would achieve with the technically more complex swing-wing approach. No ailerons were fitted, control in roll instead being implemented by differential movement of the slab tailplanes. The wing loading was high for its time, enabling the aircraft to fly at very high speed and low level with great stability without being constantly upset by turbulences near the ground such as thermals and rotors on the leeward side of mountain ranges. The EE Chief Test Pilot, Wing Commander Roland Beamont, favourably compared the TSR-2's supersonic flying characteristics to the Canberra's own subsonic flight characteristics, stating that the Canberra was more troublesome.

According to the Flight Envelope diagram, TSR-2 was capable of sustained cruise at Mach 2.05 at altitudes between 37,000 ft (11,000 m) and 51,000 ft (16,000 m) and had a dash speed of Mach 2.35 (with a limiting leading-edge temperature of 140 °C).

The aircraft featured some extremely sophisticated avionics for navigation and mission delivery, which would also prove to be one of the reasons for the spiralling costs of the project. Some features, such as forward looking radar (FLR) and side-looking radar for navigational fixing, only became commonplace on military aircraft years later. These features allowed for an innovative autopilot system which, in turn, enabled long distance terrain-following sorties as crew workload and pilot input had been greatly reduced.

"The practical solution of appointing one prime contractor to manage the whole programme with sub-contractors operating under strictly controlled and disciplined conditions was, if considered at all, waived aside."

— Wing Commander R.P. Beamont, the first TSR-2 pilot.

There were considerable problems with realising the design. Some contributing manufacturers were employed directly by the Ministry rather than through BAC, leading to communication difficulties and further cost overruns. Equipment, an area in which BAC had autonomy, would be supplied by the Ministry from "associate contractors", although the equipment would be designed and provided by BAC, subject to ministry approval. The overall outlay of funds made it the largest aircraft project in Britain to date.

Unlike most previous projects, there were to be no prototypes. Under the "development batch" procedure pioneered by the Americans (and also used by English Electric for the Lightning), there would instead be a development batch of nine airframes, to be built using production jigs. (Note: In terms of construction, there had been a large pre-emptive investment in tooling, on the assumption that production numbers would definitely be built, however, in terms of flight-testing and systems integration, the first series TSR-2s were considered development prototypes.) The choice of proceeding to production tooling turned out to be another source of delay, with the first aircraft having to adhere to strict production standards or deal with the bureaucracy of attaining concessions to allow them to exhibit differences from later airframes. Four years into the project, the first few airframes had effectively become prototypes in all but name, exhibiting a succession of omissions from the specification and differences from the intended pre-production and production batches.

== Operational history ==
=== Testing ===
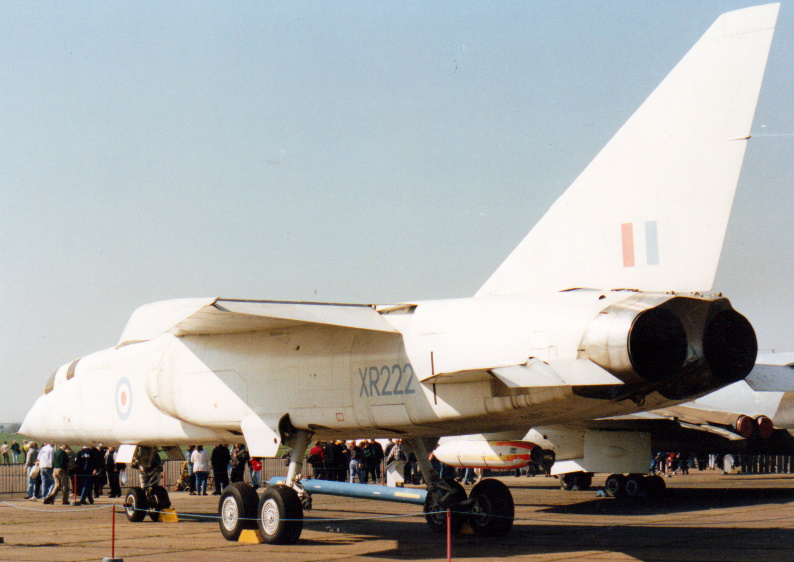
Serial number XR222 was one of only three "flight ready" TSR-2s completed, photographed at the Supermarine Spitfire 60th Anniversary Airshow, Duxford, 1996.

Despite the increasing costs, the first two aircraft of the development batch were completed. Engine development (Note: The loss of the Avro Vulcan flying testbed aircraft and two ground failures in 1964 resulted in the TSR-2 engine development being far behind schedule.) and undercarriage problems led to delays for the first flight which meant that the TSR-2 missed the opportunity to be displayed to the public at 1964's Farnborough Airshow. In the days leading up to testing, Denis Healey — the Opposition shadow secretary for defence — had criticised the aircraft, saying that by the time it was introduced it would face "new anti-aircraft" missiles that would shoot it down, making it prohibitively expensive at £16 million per aircraft (on the basis of only 30 ordered).

Test pilot Roland Beamont finally made the first flight from the Aeroplane and Armament Experimental Establishment (A&AEE) at Boscombe Down, Wiltshire, on 27 September 1964. Initial flight tests were all performed with the undercarriage down and engine power strictly controlled—with limits of 250 kn (290 mph; 460 km/h) and 10,000 ft (3,000 m) on the first (15-minute) flight. Shortly after takeoff on XR219's second flight, vibration from a fuel pump at the resonant frequency of the human eyeball caused the pilot to throttle back one engine to avoid momentary loss of vision.

Only on the 10th test flight was the landing gear successfully retracted—problems preventing this on previous occasions, but serious vibration problems on landing persisted throughout the flight testing programme. The first supersonic test flight (Flight 14) was achieved on the transfer from A&AEE, Boscombe Down, to BAC Warton. During the flight, the aircraft achieved Mach 1 on dry power only (supercruise). Following this, Beamont lit a single reheat unit as the other engine's reheat fuel pump was unserviceable, with the result that the aircraft accelerated away from the chase English Electric Lightning (a high speed interceptor) flown by Wing Commander James "Jimmy" Dell, who had to catch up using reheat on both engines. On flying the TSR-2 himself, Dell described the prototype as handling "like a big Lightning".

Over a period of six months, a total of 24 test flights were conducted. Most of the complex electronics were not fitted to the first aircraft, so these flights were all concerned with the basic flying qualities of the aircraft which, according to the test pilots involved, were outstanding. Speeds of Mach 1.12 and sustained low-level flights down to 200 ft were achieved above the Pennines. Undercarriage vibration problems continued, however, and only in the final few flights, when XR219 was fitted with additional tie-struts on the already complex landing gear, was there a significant reduction in them. The last test flight took place on 31 March 1965.

Although the test flying programme was not completed and the TSR-2 was undergoing typical design and systems modifications reflective of its sophisticated configuration, "[T]here was no doubt that the airframe would be capable of accomplishing the tasks set for it and that it represented a major advance on any other type."

Costs continued to rise, which led to concerns at both company and government upper management levels, and the aircraft was also falling short of many of the requirements laid out in OR.343, such as takeoff distance and combat radius. As a cost-saving measure, a reduced specification was agreed upon, notably reductions in combat radius to 650 nmi (750 mi; 1,200 km), the top speed to Mach 1.75 and takeoff run up increased from 1,800 to 3,000 feet (550 to 915 m).

=== Project cancellation ===
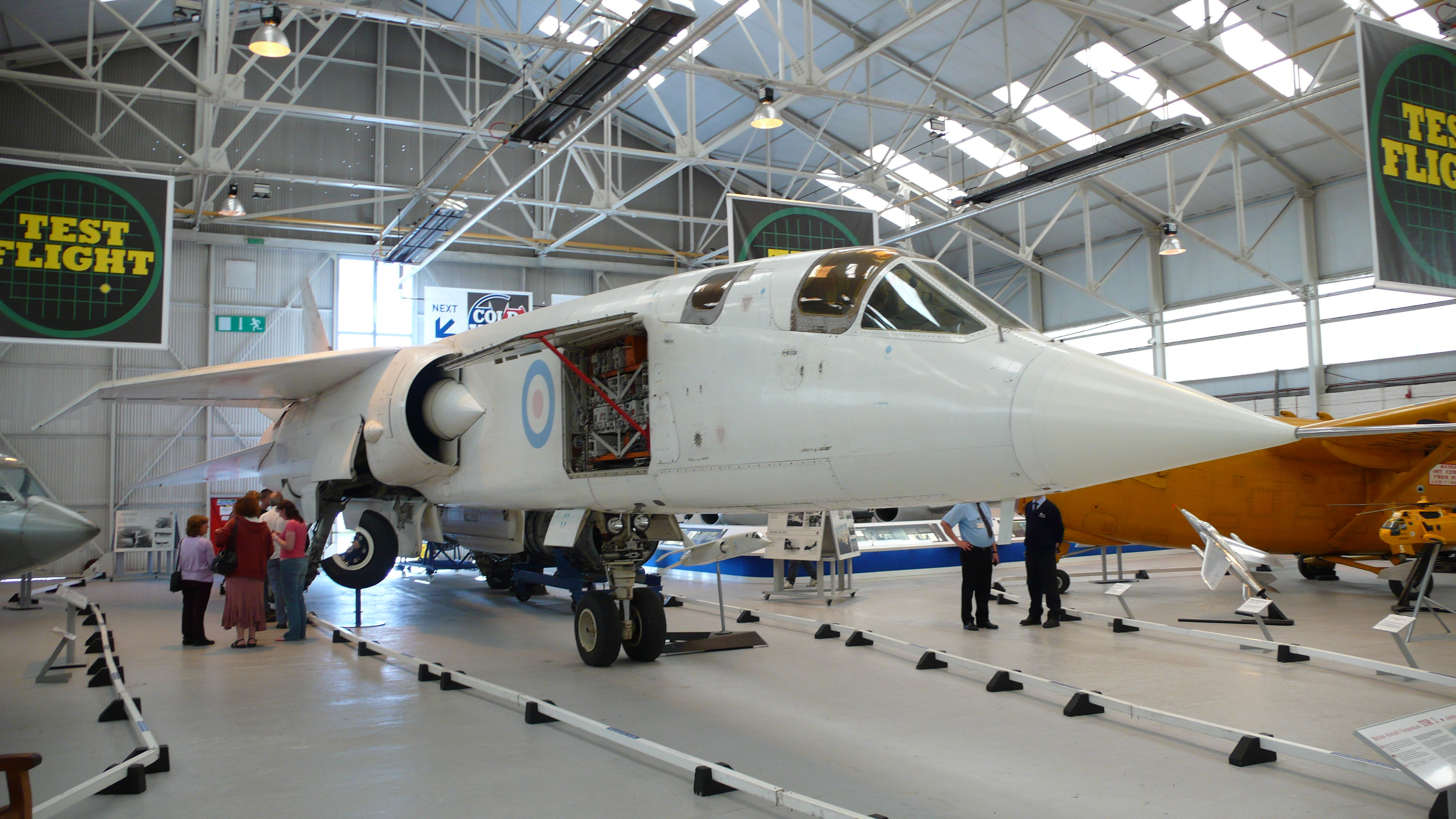
XR220 at the RAF Museum, Cosford, 2007. The two cockpit canopies are coated with a thin film of gold to protect the occupant's eyes from a nuclear flash

By the 1960s, the United States military was developing the swing-wing F-111 project as a follow-on to the Republic F-105 Thunderchief, a fast low-level fighter-bomber designed in the 1950s with an internal bay for a nuclear weapon. There had been some interest in the TSR-2 from Australia for the Royal Australian Air Force (RAAF), but in 1963, the RAAF chose to buy the F-111 instead, having been offered a better price and delivery schedule by the American manufacturer. Nonetheless, the RAAF had to wait 10 years before the F-111 was ready to enter service, by which time the anticipated programme cost had tripled. The RAF was also asked to consider the F-111 as an alternative cost-saving measure. In response to suggestions of cancellation, BAC employees held a protest march, and the new Labour government, which had come to power in 1964, issued strong denials. However, at two Cabinet meetings held on 1 April 1965, it was decided to cancel the TSR-2 on the grounds of projected cost, and instead to obtain an option agreement to acquire up to 110 F-111 aircraft with no immediate commitment to buy. This decision was announced in the budget speech of 6 April 1965. The maiden flight of the second development batch aircraft, XR220, was due on the day of the announcement, but following an accident in conveying the airframe to Boscombe Down, (Note: The XR220 fuselage was loaded onto a "smallish" trailer, tipping over while manoeuvering around the Lightning chase T.4, with its cargo "unceremoniously dumped" onto the concrete.) coupled with the announcement of the project cancellation, it never happened. Ultimately, only the first prototype, XR219, ever took to the air. A week later, the Chancellor, James Callaghan, defended the decision in a debate in the House of Commons, saying that the F-111 would prove cheaper. All airframes were then ordered to be destroyed and burned.

"The trouble with the TSR-2 was that it tried to combine the most advanced state of every art in every field. The aircraft firms and the RAF were trying to get the Government on the hook and understated the cost. But TSR-2 cost far more than even their private estimates, and so I have no doubt about the decision to cancel."

— Denis Healey, then Minister of Defence.

Aeronautical engineer and designer of the Hawker Hurricane Sir Sydney Camm said of the TSR-2: "All modern aircraft have four dimensions: span, length, height and politics. TSR-2 simply got the first three right."

=== TSR-2 replacements ===
To replace the TSR-2, the Air Ministry initially placed an option for the F-111K (a modified F-111A with F-111C enhancements) but also considered two other choices: a Rolls-Royce Spey (RB.168 Spey 25R) conversion of a Dassault Mirage IV (the Dassault/BAC Spey-Mirage IV) and an enhanced Blackburn Buccaneer S.2 with a new nav-attack system and reconnaissance capability, referred to as the "Buccaneer 2-Double-Star". Neither proposal was pursued as a TSR-2 replacement although a final decision was reserved until the 1966 Defence Review. Defence Minister Healey's memo about the F-111 and the Cabinet minutes regarding the final cancellation of the TSR-2 indicate that the F-111 was preferred.

Following the 1966 Defence White Paper, the Air Ministry decided on two aircraft: the F-111K, with a longer-term replacement being a joint Anglo-French project for a variable geometry strike aircraft – the Anglo French Variable Geometry Aircraft (AFVG). A censure debate followed on 1 May 1967, in which Healey claimed the cost of the TSR-2 would have been £1,700 million over 15 years including running costs, compared with £1,000 million for the F-111K/AFVG combination. Although 10 F-111Ks were ordered in April 1966 with an additional order for 40 in April 1967, the F-111 programme suffered enormous cost escalation coupled with the devaluation of the pound, leading to its cost far exceeding that of the TSR-2 projection. Many technical problems were still unresolved before successful operational deployment and, faced with poorer-than-projected performance estimates, the order for 50 F-111Ks for the RAF was eventually cancelled in January 1968. (Note: The first two F-111Ks (one strike/reconnaissance F-111K and one trainer/strike TF-111K) were in the final stages of assembly when the order was cancelled. The two aircraft were later completed and accepted by the USAF as test aircraft with the YF-111A designation.) (Note: The AFVG project had already been terminated in 1967.)

To provide a suitable alternative to the TSR-2, the RAF settled on a combination of the F-4 Phantom II and the Blackburn Buccaneer, some of which were transferred from the Royal Navy. These were the same aircraft that the RAF had derided in order to get the TSR-2 go-ahead, but the Buccaneer proved capable and remained in service until 1994. The RN and RAF versions of the Phantom II were given the designation F-4K and F-4M respectively, and entered service as the Phantom FG.1 (fighter/ground attack) and Phantom FGR.2 (fighter/ground attack/reconnaissance), remaining in service (in the air-to-air role) until 1992.

The RAF's Phantoms were replaced in the strike/reconnaissance role by the SEPECAT Jaguar in the mid-1970s. In the 1980s, both the Jaguar and Buccaneer were eventually replaced in this role by the variable-geometry Panavia Tornado, a much smaller design than either the F-111 or the TSR-2. Experience in the design and development of the avionics, particularly the terrain-following capabilities, were used on the later Tornado programme. In the late 1970s, as the Tornado was nearing full production, an aviation businessman, Christopher de Vere, initiated a highly speculative feasibility study into resurrecting and updating the TSR-2 project. Despite persistent lobbying of the UK government of the time however, his proposal was not taken seriously and came to nothing.

== Surviving aircraft ==
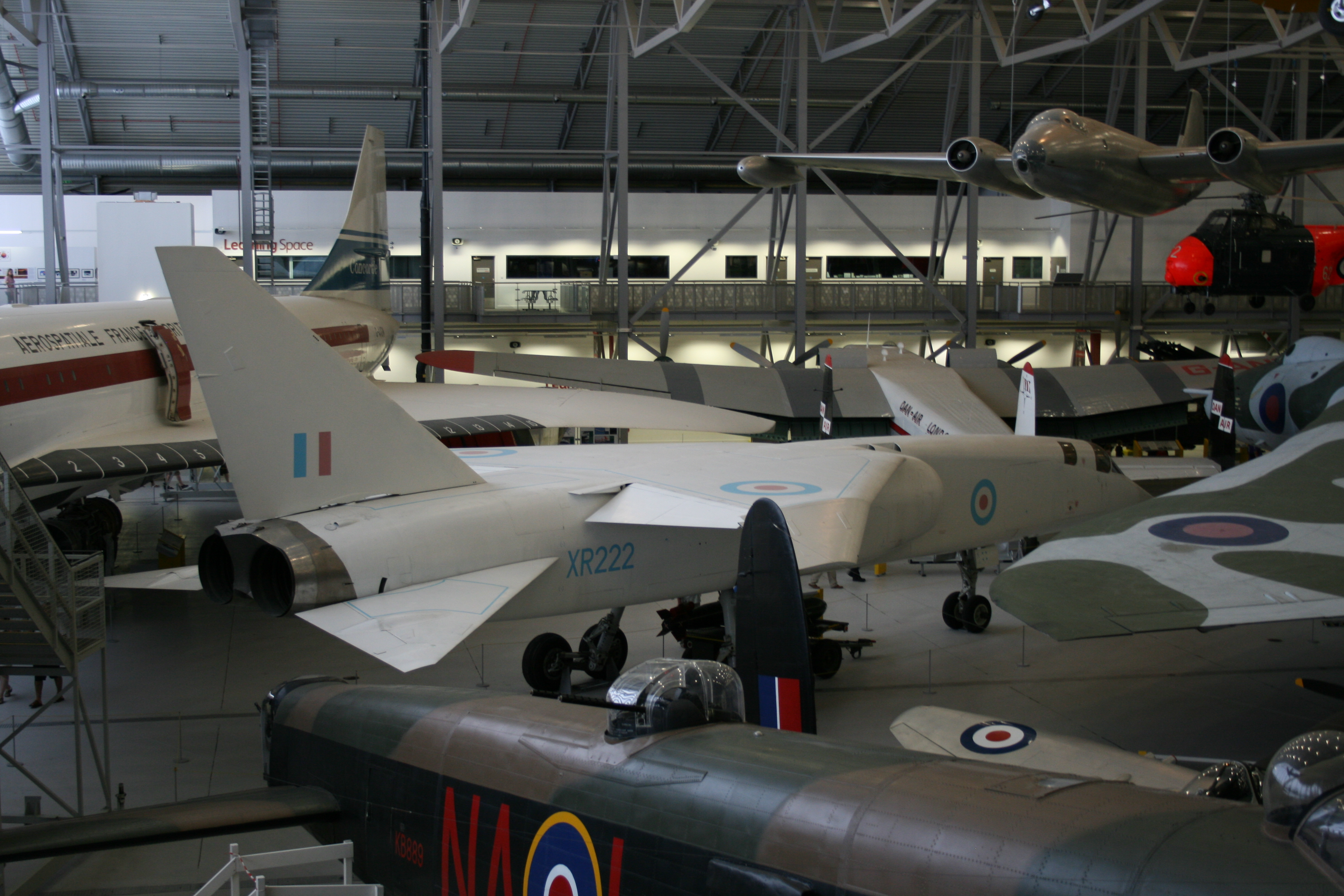
TSR-2 XR222 photographed at Duxford, 2009

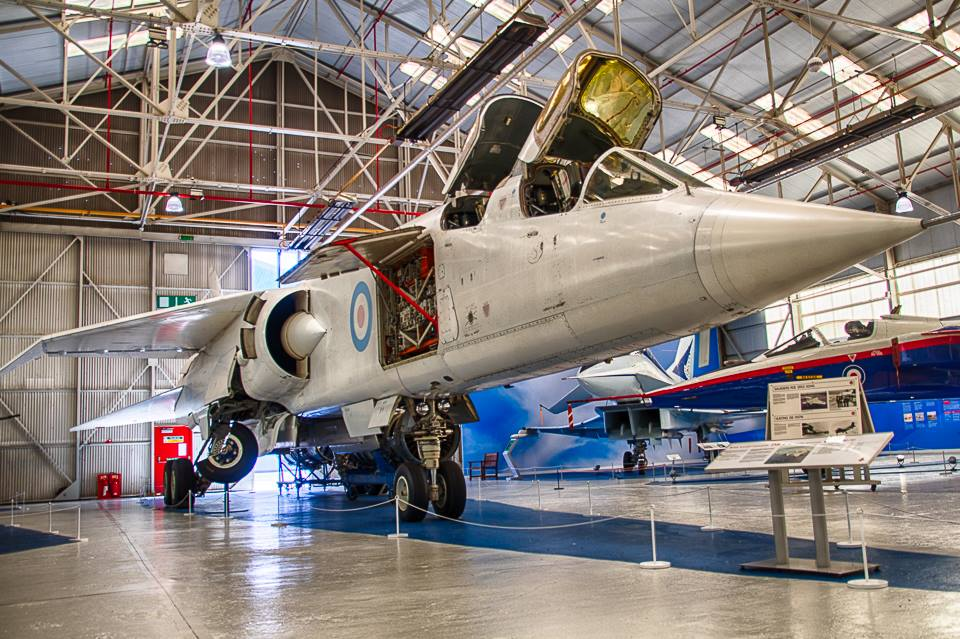
TSR-2 XR220 at RAF Museum Cosford, UK

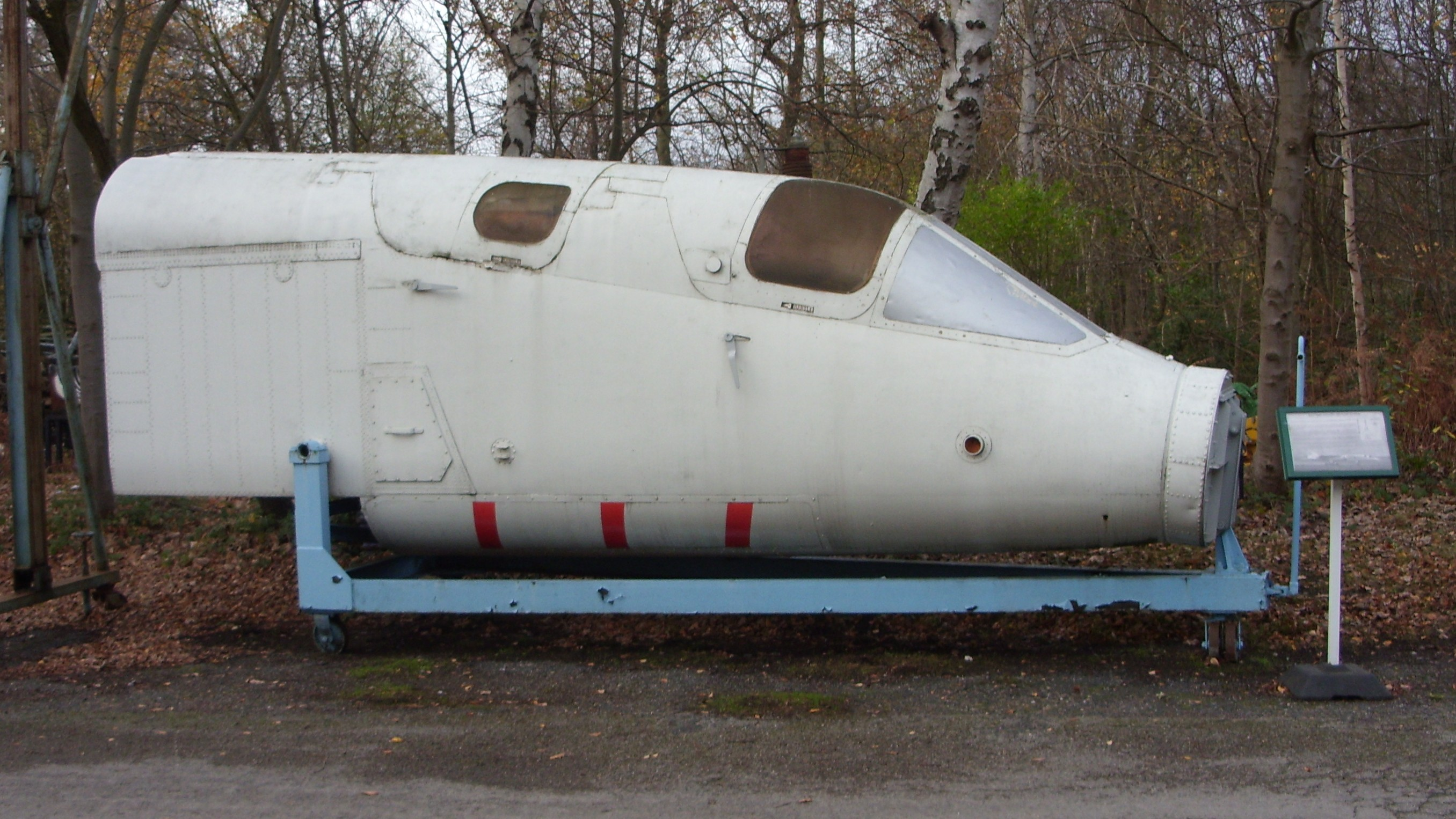
Forward fuselage used for testing seen on display at Brooklands Museum

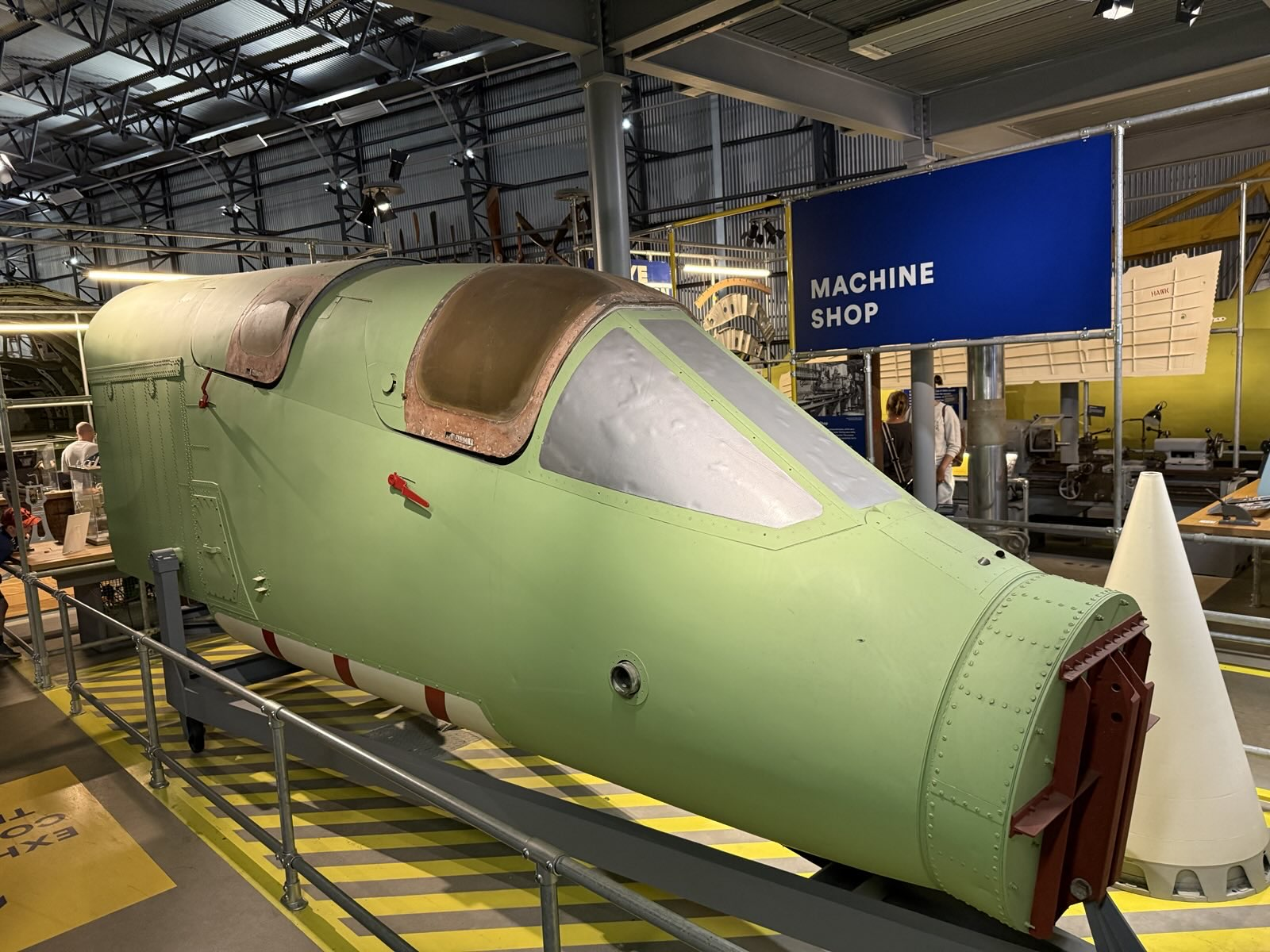
TSR-2 cockpit at Brooklands Museum

The TSR-2 tooling, jigs and many of the part completed aircraft were all scrapped at Brooklands within six months of the cancellation. Two airframes eventually survived: the complete XR220 at the Royal Air Force Museum Midlands, RAF Cosford, and the much less complete XR222 at the Imperial War Museum Duxford. The only airframe ever to fly, XR219, along with the completed XR221 and part completed XR223 were taken to Shoeburyness and used as targets to test the vulnerability of a modern airframe and systems to gunfire and shrapnel. Four additional completed airframes, XR224, XR225, XR226 and one incomplete airframe XR227 (X-06,07,08 and 09) were scrapped by R. J. Coley and Son, Hounslow Middlesex. Four further airframe serials XR228 to XR231 were allocated but these aircraft were allegedly not built. Construction of a further 10 aircraft (X-10 to 19) allocated serials XS660 to 669 was started but all partly built airframes were again scrapped by R. J. Coley. The last serial of that batch, XS670 is listed as "cancelled", as are those of another batch of 50 projected aircraft, XS944 to 995. By coincidence, the projected batch of 46 General Dynamics F-111Ks (of which the first four were the trainer variant TF-111K) were allocated RAF serials XV884-887 and 902–947, but these also were cancelled when the first two were still incomplete.

The haste with which the project was scrapped has been the source of much argument and bitterness since and is comparable to the cancellation and destruction of the American Northrop Flying Wing bombers in 1950, and the Avro Canada CF-105 Arrow interceptor that was scrapped in 1959.

Surviving airframes

- XR220 (X-02) on display at RAF Museum Cosford
- XR222 (X-04) on display at Imperial War Museum Duxford
- Cockpit section on display at Brooklands Museum
- Bristol Siddeley Olympus 22R-320 – 2 engines on display at Gatwick Aviation Museum

== Specifications ==
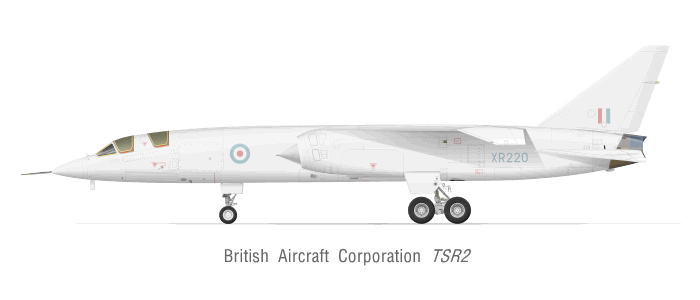
XR220 profile drawing

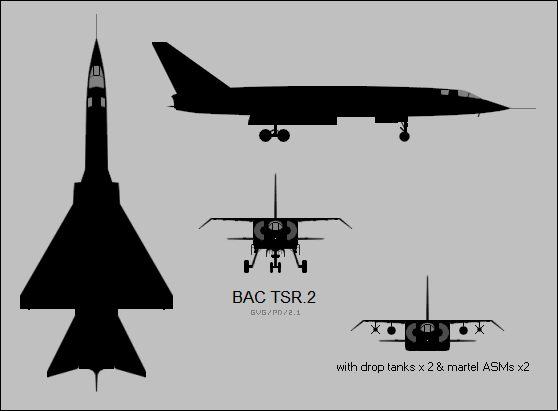
BAC TSR-2

Data from TSR2: Britain's Lost Bomber

General characteristics

- Crew: 2
- Length: 89 ft (27 m)
- Wingspan: 37 ft 2 in (11.33 m)
- Height: 23 ft 9 in (7.24 m)
- Wing area: 702.9 sq ft (65.30 m^{2})
- Empty weight: 54,750 lb (24,834 kg)
- Gross weight: 79,573 lb (36,094 kg)
- Max takeoff weight: 103,500 lb (46,947 kg)
- Powerplant: 2 × Bristol Siddeley B.Ol.22R Olympus Mk.320 afterburning turbojet engines, 22,000 lbf (98 kN) thrust each dry, 30,610 lbf (136.2 kN) with afterburner

Performance

- Maximum speed: Mach 2.15 at 40,000 ft (12,192 m), M1.1 at sea level
- Range: 2,500 nmi (2,900 mi, 4,600 km)
- Combat range: 750 nmi (860 mi, 1,390 km)
- Service ceiling: 40,000 ft (12,000 m)
- Rate of climb: 15,000 ft/min (76 m/s)
- Thrust/weight: 0.59

Armament
Total weapons load of 10,000 lb (4,500 kg); 6,000 lb (2,700 kg) internal and 4,000 lb (1,800 kg) external

- Internal weapons bay, 20 ft (6 m) long, with (initially) 1 Red Beard 15 kt nuclear weapon or as intended 2 × OR.1177 300 kt nuclear weapons or 6 × 1,000 lb (450 kg) HE bombs. Final designed normal load in nuclear role of up to 4 × WE.177 nuclear weapons, two side-by-side or in tandem in weapons bay, two on external underwing stores pylons.

Avionics

- Autonetics Verdan autopilot modified by Elliott Automation
- Ferranti (terrain-following radar and navigation/attack systems)
- EMI (Side looking airborne radar)
- Marconi (general avionics)
- Cossor (IFF)
- Plessey (Radio)

== See also ==
- Stratos 4 an anime series where the main aircraft is a fictionalised version of the TSR-2

Aircraft of comparable role, configuration, and era

- Avro Canada CF-105 Arrow
- Convair B-58 Hustler
- Dassault Mirage IV
- General Dynamics F-111 Aardvark
- North American A-5 Vigilante
- Sukhoi Su-24

Related lists

- List of bomber aircraft
