= Anti-flash white =

Paint designed to reflect some of the thermal radiation from a nuclear explosion

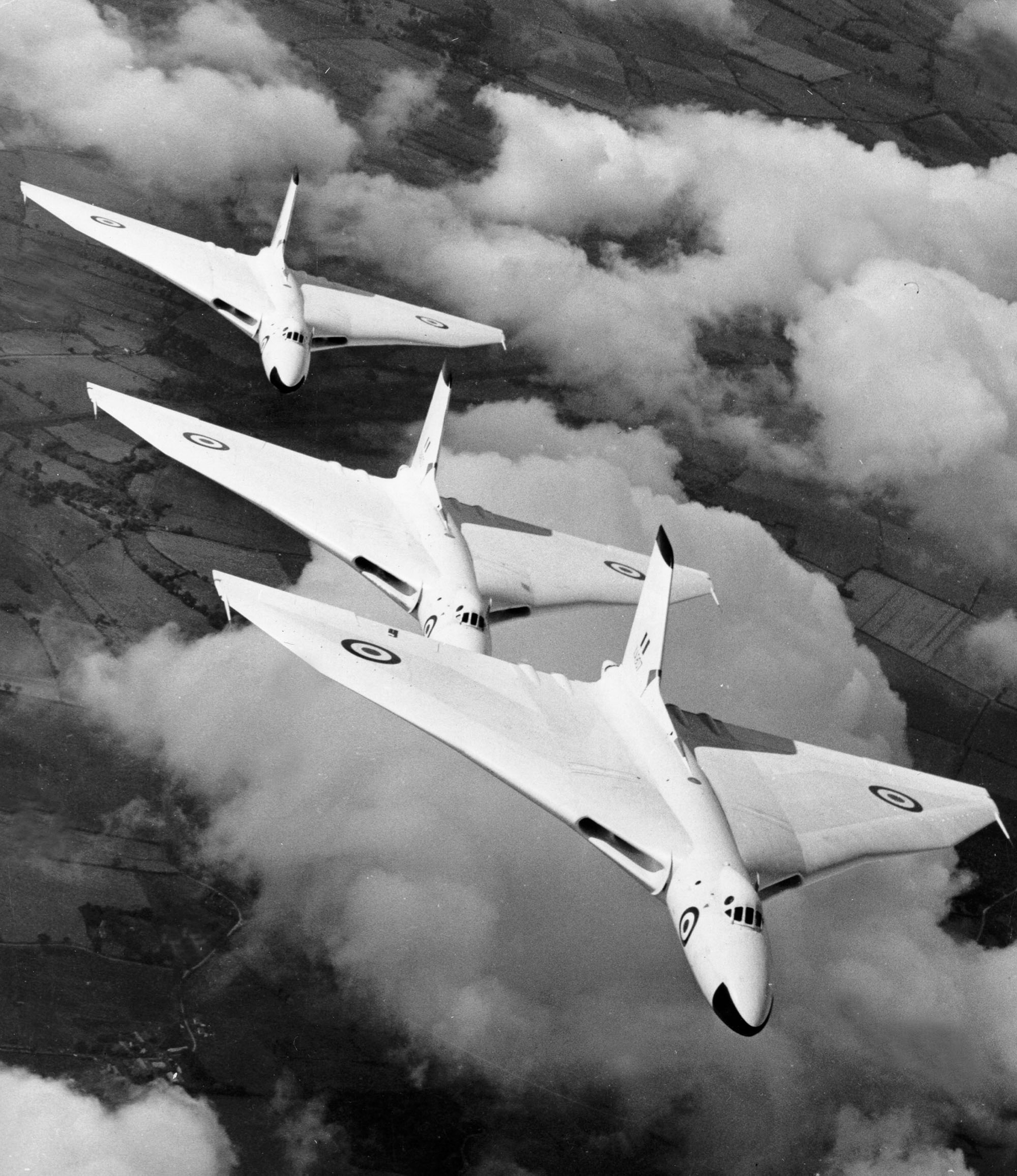
British Avro Vulcans with dark roundels in 1957

Anti-flash white is a white colour commonly seen on British, Soviet, and U.S. nuclear bombers. The purpose of the colour is to reflect some of the thermal radiation from a nuclear explosion, protecting the aircraft and its occupants.

== China ==
Some variants of the Xian H-6 had the underside of the fuselage painted anti-flash white.

== Soviet Union/Russia ==
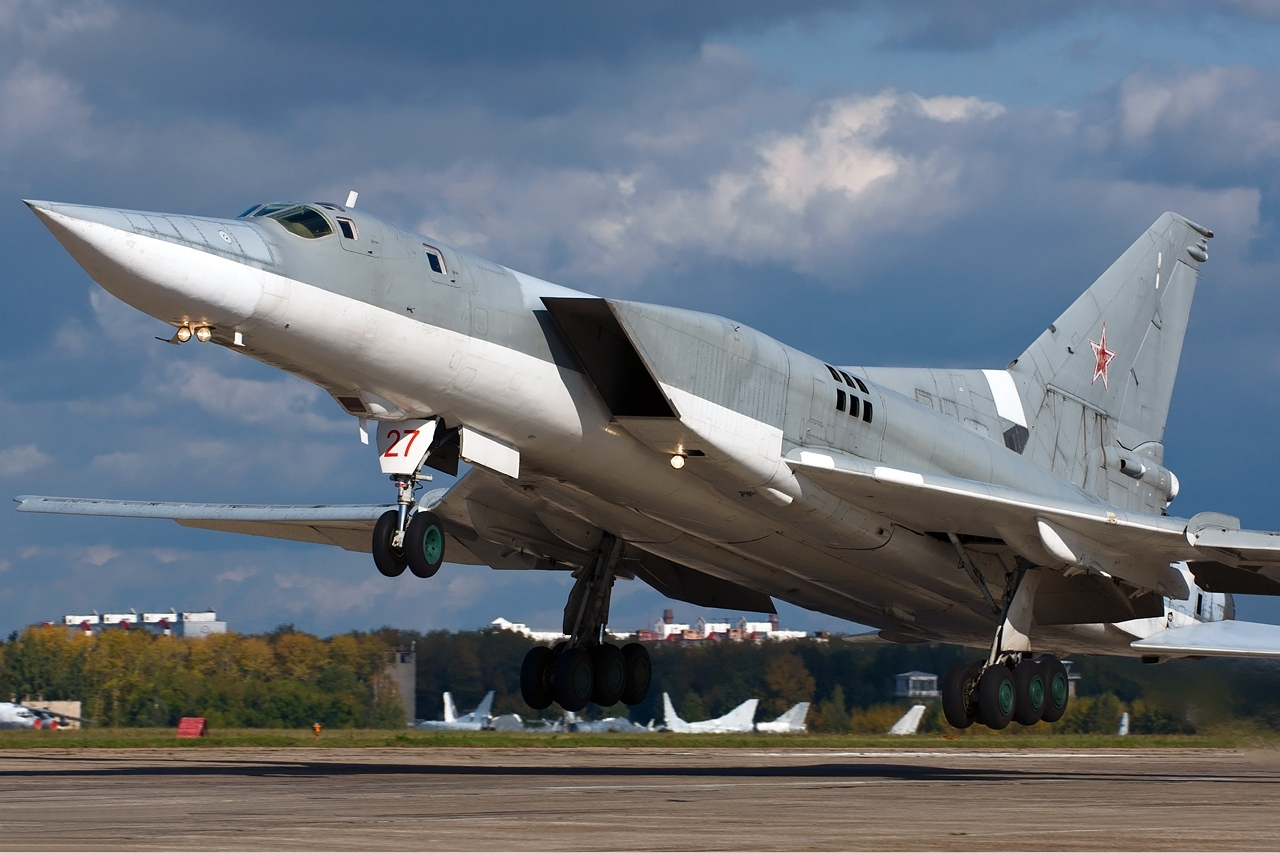
A Tupolev Tu-22M with anti-flash white on the underside

Some nuclear bombers had the underside of the fuselage painted anti-flash white with the upper surfaces painted light silver-gray. This was true for the specially fitted, single Soviet Tu-95V bomber that test-deployed the most powerful bomb of any kind – the 50+ MT-rating Tsar Bomba on 30 October 1961 – as it had the anti-flash white on all its undersurfaces and sides.

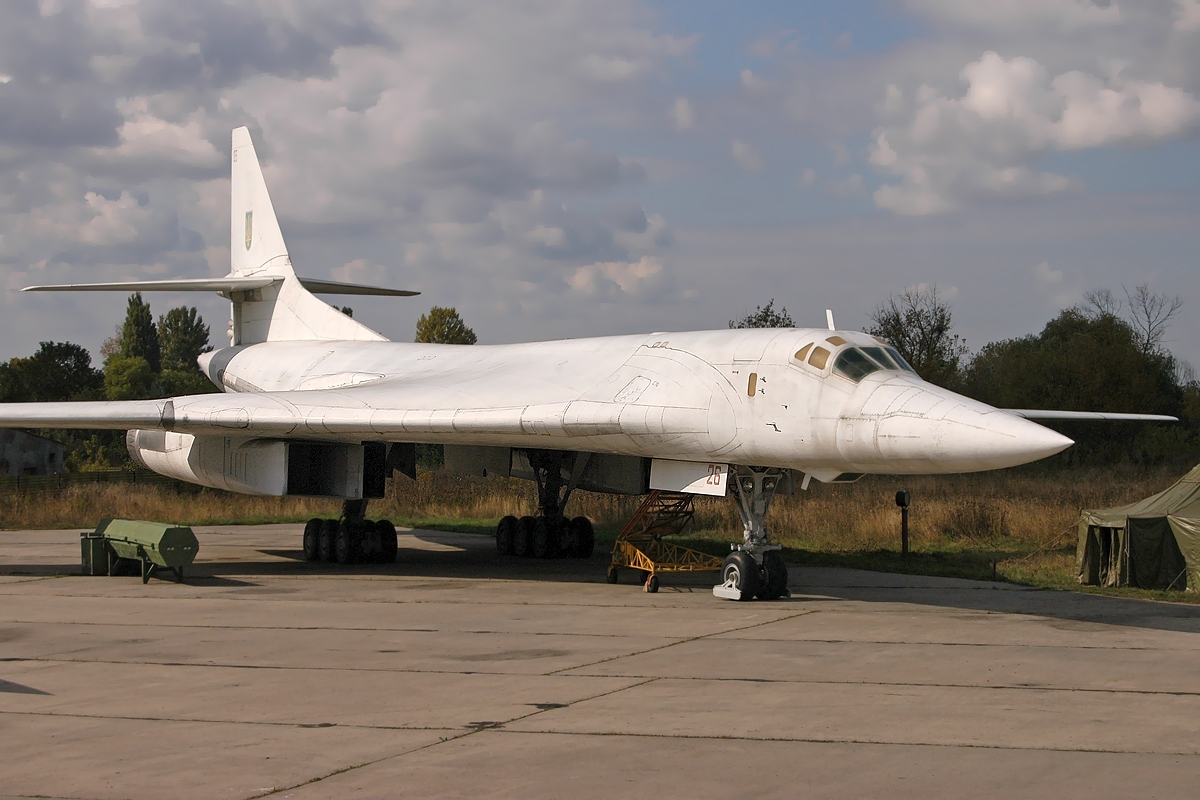
Ukrainian Tupolev Tu-160 in all-over anti-flash white with pale fin flash

The Tupolev Tu-160 of the 1980s was the first series-built Soviet/Russian bomber aircraft to be painted anti-flash white all over, leading to its Beliy Lebed ("White Swan") Russian nickname.

== United Kingdom ==
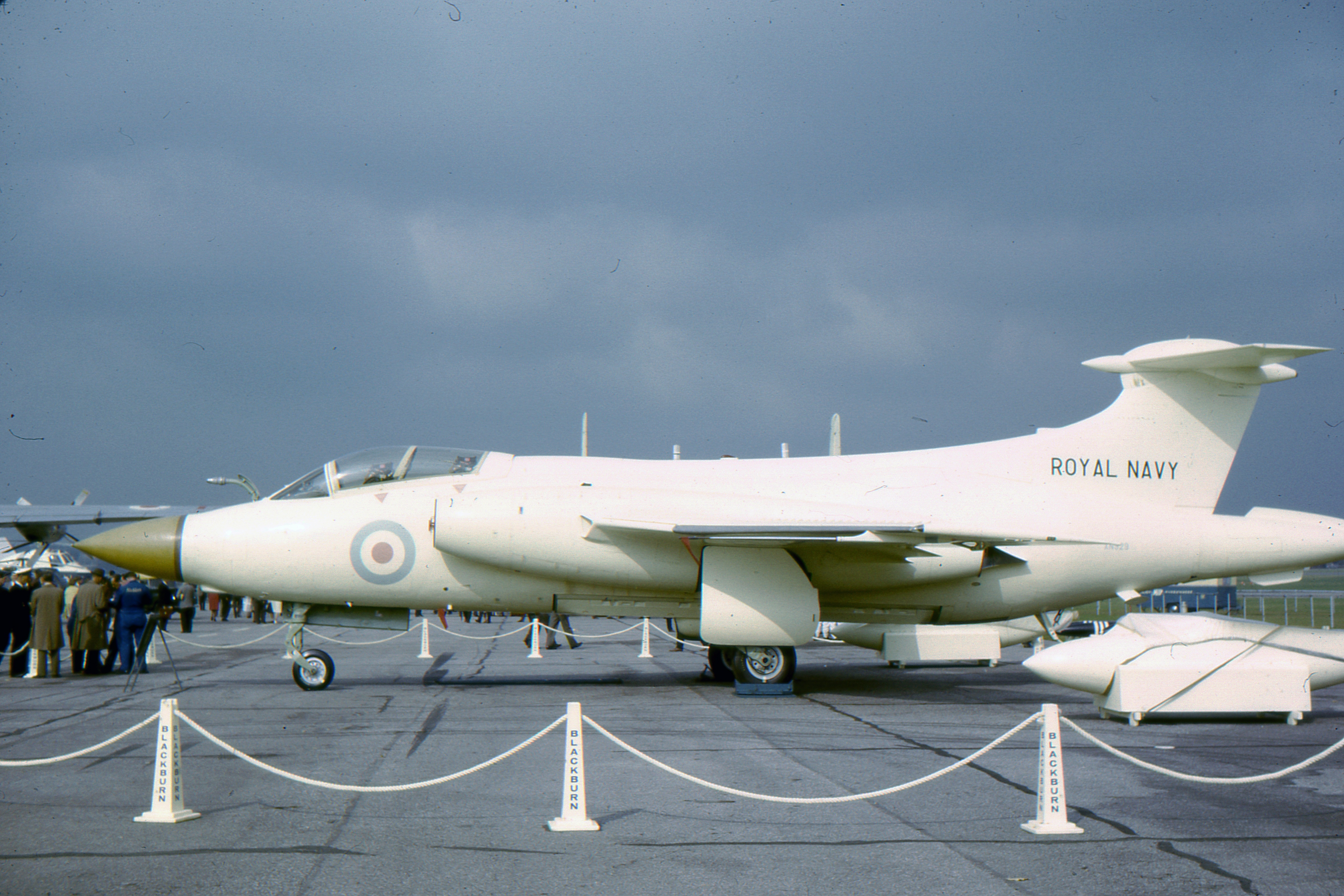
A Blackburn Buccaneer at the 1962 Farnborough Airshow in anti-flash white with pale roundels

Anti-flash white was used on the Royal Air Force V bombers force and the Royal Navy Blackburn Buccaneer when used in the nuclear strike role. Nuclear bombers were given – though not at first, until the problem was considered – salmon pink and baby blue roundels and fin flash rather than the traditional dark red, white and blue.

Anti-flash white was applied to several prototype aircraft, including the British Aircraft Corporation TSR-2. Paint used on the Avro Vulcan was manufactured by Cellon, and that on the Handley Page Victor by Titanine Ltd.

== United States ==
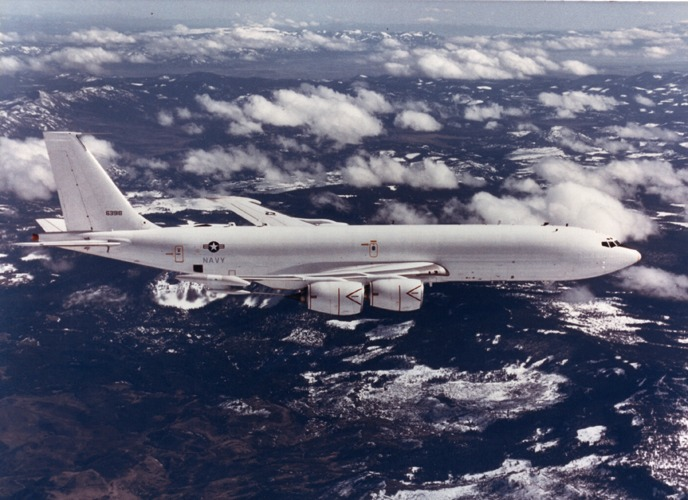
An E-6 Mercury airborne, painted in anti-flash white

Anti-flash white

Color coordinates
- Hex triplet: #F2F3F4
- sRGB^{B} (r, g, b): (242, 243, 244)
- HSV (h, s, v): (210°, 1%, 96%)
- CIELCh_{uv} (L, C, h): (96, 1, 236°)
- Source: ColorHexa
- B: Normalized to [0–255] (byte)

Many Strategic Air Command nuclear bombers carried anti-flash white without insignia on the underside of the fuselage with light silver-gray or natural metal (later light camouflage) on the upper surfaces.

United States Navy E-6 Mercury remain painted in anti-flash white, as of October 2023.

== Other aircraft ==
Concorde was painted white to reduce the effects of the sun's heat on its aluminum skin, which was already heated to more than 90 °C (194 °F) at Mach 2 by aerodynamic heating.

Aircraft with at least part of the fuselage painted anti-flash white on nuclear delivery variants:

Canada

- CF-105 Arrow prototypes

China

- Xian H-6

Soviet Union/Russia

- Myasishchev M-4
- Tupolev Tu-16
- Tupolev Tu-95
- Tupolev Tu-22M
- Tupolev Tu-160

United Kingdom

- V bombers
  - Avro Vulcan
  - Handley Page Victor
  - Vickers Valiant
- Blackburn Buccaneer
- English Electric Canberra (experimental)
- BAC TSR-2 prototype
- Saunders-Roe SR.53 interceptor prototype

United States

- Convair B-36
- Boeing B-47 Stratojet
- Boeing B-52 Stratofortress
- North American A-5 Vigilante
- North American XB-70 Valkyrie prototype
- Rockwell B-1 Lancer prototype

== See also ==
- Royal Air Force roundels
- Lists of colors
- The House in the Middle – film that demonstrates the thermal flash protective effects of the related white wash paint
