= Titanine, Incorporated (Union City, New Jersey) =

Defunct industrial company based in Hudson County, New Jersey, US

Titanine, Incorporated (Union City, New Jersey) was an industrial company which produced finishes for the aircraft industry. This included lacquers and aircraft dope. The company was founded by the English company Titanine Ltd

Titanine received a joint United States Army and United States Navy award for excellence in contributing to the World War II effort. The citation was presented in October 1942. The award was given to Eric G. Davis, General Manager of Titanine, on November 20, 1942.

The company owned land in Brooklyn, New York. A vacant plot at Varick Avenue and Meeker Avenue was sold by the firm in June 1959.
