= 2024 in aviation =

This is a list of aviation-related events in 2024.

== Events ==
=== January ===
2 January
A runway collision at Haneda Airport in Tokyo occurred when Japan Airlines Flight 516, operated by an Airbus A350-900 arriving from Sapporo, collided with a Japan Coast Guard aircraft and both aircraft caught on fire. This resulted in the complete destruction of both aircraft. All 367 passengers and 12 crew members of the Airbus were evacuated. There were six occupants on board the Coast Guard aircraft, a De Havilland Canada Dash 8; the captain escaped with serious injuries whilst the remaining five crew members were killed. This was the first hull loss of an A350. The Coast Guard aircraft was scheduled to provide relief to Niigata in response to the previous day's Noto Peninsula earthquake.

5 January
Shortly after departing Portland International Airport in Oregon, a Boeing 737 MAX 9 operating as Alaska Airlines Flight 1282 suffered an explosive decompression when a plug covering an unused exit door blew out. The aircraft made a safe return to Portland with all 177 occupants alive. The FAA subsequently ordered all 737 MAX 9 planes fitted with door plugs to be grounded for inspection. It was subsequently reported that Alaska Airlines and United Airlines both discovered faults on other 737s.

12 January
An autonomous underwater vehicle – developed by the National Institute of Ocean Technology and launched with the aim of finding the wreckage of an Indian Air Force Antonov An-26 that disappeared over the Bay of Bengal on 22 July 2016 – located the wreckage of the aircraft 310 kilometres (190 mi) off the Chennai coast.

Following airstrikes conducted by the United States and the United Kingdom against Houthi-held Yemen, the Federal Air Transport Agency banned Russian airlines from flying through Yemeni airspace until further notice.

16 January
The United States Department of Justice blocked the proposed $3.8 billion acquisition of Spirit Airlines by JetBlue, citing that it would create a lack of competition in low-cost carriers. The stock price of Spirit Airlines dropped by 47% after the decision was made.

18 January
At the WINGS India 2024 event in Hyderabad, Akasa Air placed an order for 150 Boeing 737 MAX aircraft, including both the MAX 10 and MAX 200 variants.

23 January
A BAe Jetstream 32 operating as Northwestern Air Flight 738 crashed shortly after takeoff from Fort Smith Airport, Northwest Territories, Canada, when at 500 m (1,600 ft), killing six out of the seven on board.

24 January
A Russian Ilyushin Il-76M transport aircraft, reportedly carrying 65 Ukrainian prisoners of war along with three other passengers and six crew from Chkalovsky air base near Moscow to Belgorod, crashed in the Belgorod region of Russia.

=== February ===
6 February
A Robinson R44 Raven II helicopter piloted by former Chilean president Sebastián Piñera lost control and crashed into Lake Ranco in Chile. Piñera was killed and the other three people on board survived.

9 February
A Bombardier Challenger 600 operating as Hop-A-Jet Flight 823 crashed into a vehicle on Interstate 75 in Collier County, Florida while attempting to make an emergency landing. Two of the five on board were killed in the crash.

A Eurocopter EC130 crashed, killing all six occupants, including Nigerian banker Herbert Wigwe.

11 February
The United States Department of Justice seized a Boeing 747-300 registered as YV3531 belonging to Venezuelan state-owned airline Emtrasur Cargo. The DOJ said that the aircraft was sold to Emtrasur Cargo by Mahan Air, a sanctioned Iranian airline due to its affiliation with the Islamic Revolutionary Guard Corps, which was in violation of American export control laws. The aircraft was initially detained by Argentina on 6 June 2022, shortly after the United States had issued a seizure warrant. The aircraft was subsequently scrapped at Dade-Collier Training and Transition Airport.

18 February
Air Serbia Flight 324, an Embraer 195 operated by Marathon Airlines, struck landing lights on takeoff at Belgrade Nikola Tesla Airport. The aircraft flew for another hour before making an emergency landing at the same airport with a gaping hole in the fuselage. All 111 occupants were reported safe.

20–25 February
The Singapore Airshow was held. Highlights included orders for Airbus from Vietjet (20 A330neos) and Starlux Airlines (three A330neos and five A350Fs), Boeing from Thai Airways (45 787-9s) and Royal Brunei Airlines (four 787-9s), and Comac from Tibet Airlines (40 C919s and 10 ARJ21s).

21 February
The TAI TF Kaan, a fifth-gen stealth fighter being developed by Turkish Aerospace Industries, performed its maiden flight.

26 February
Canadian Budget airline Lynx Air ceased operations due to financial issues.

=== March ===
5 March
A Dash 8-300 operating as Safarilink Aviation Flight 53 from Wilson Airport, Nairobi to Diani near Mombasa was involved in a mid-air collision with a Cessna 172 operated by a local flying school. The Dash returned to Wilson and landed safely with no injuries among the 39 passengers and 5 crew. The Cessna crashed in Nairobi National Park killing the two occupants.

8 March
David E. Harris, the first African American pilot who flew for a major airline, died at the age of 89.

10 March
A Boeing 787-9 operating as LATAM Airlines Flight 800 experienced an in-flight upset, injuring 50 of the 272 occupants on board the aircraft. The plane made an emergency landing at Auckland Airport.

12 March
A Russian Ilyushin Il-76 military transport aircraft crashed near Belgorod after suffering an engine fire. All 15 on board were killed.

In response to Argentina's role in the seizure of a Venezuelan state-owned Emtrasur Cargo Boeing 747-300 registered as YV3531 by the DOJ, Venezuela closed its airspace to Argentine aircraft. The Venezuelan Government stated that the airspace would remain blocked until Argentina compensated the country.

22 March
The Boom XB-1, a prototype/technology demonstrator supersonic aircraft developed by Boom Supersonic, conducts its first flight from Mojave Air and Space Port. The flight reaches a maximum altitude of 7,120 feet (2,170 m) and a top speed of 246 knots (456 km/h; 283 mph) during its 12-minute flight. The company aims to use the XB-1 to develop its Overture supersonic airliner, of which the XB-1 is a roughly 1/3rd scale model.

29 March
In response to Venezuela's airspace closure to Argentina, the Argentine Government and United States Government lodges a complaint to the International Civil Aviation Organization (ICAO) to protest the closure, requesting that the airspace be reopened as a violation of the Chicago Convention.

=== April ===
4 April
US company Skydweller Aero completes the world's first unmanned flight of a large solar-powered aircraft.

13 April
Iraq, Jordan, Lebanon, Syria, Kuwait and Israel all close their airspaces in response to the Iranian strikes in Israel.

17 April
The FAA implements a ground stop for Alaska Airlines and its subsidiary Horizon Air (meaning planes are not permitted to take off) after a notification by the airline. Alaska Airlines makes the request after an issue surfaced during a routine system upgrade essential for ensuring aircraft weight and balance, although the exact nature of the issue is not disclosed. The airline states that it acted "out of an abundance of caution".

18 April
Kenya's highest ranking military officer, General Francis Ogolla, and nine other members of the Kenya Defence Forces are killed in the crash of a UH-1 Huey in western Kenya.

23 April
Two Royal Malaysian Navy helicopters collide over Lumut, Perak in Malaysia during a formation flight as part of a rehearsal for the upcoming Navy day parade. All 10 people on board the Leonardo AW139 and Eurocopter Fennec are killed.

An Alaska Air Fuel Douglas C-54D crashed shortly after takeoff from Fairbanks International Airport. Both pilots, the only people on board, are killed.

25 April
Southwest Airlines and American Airlines report large first-quarter economic losses, with Southwest losing US$231 million and American expecting to lay off over 2,000 employees during the remainder of the year. In addition, Southwest is to stop flying to Cozumel, Syracuse and Bellingham airports. These declines have limited the airlines' abilities to order more aircraft in the near future, with Southwest cancelling some of its Boeing 737 orders for the year.

30 April
Australian low-cost airline Bonza which launched operations in January 2023, enters voluntary administration with all services suspended.

=== May ===
3 May
Dick Rutan, older brother of Burt Rutan, dies at the age of 85 in Coeur d'Alene, Idaho. He was the pilot of the first non-stop round-the-world flight on board the Voyager aircraft in 1986.

17 May
Bette Nash, the world's longest-serving flight attendant, dies at the age of 88, after working for Eastern Air Lines and then American Airlines for a total of 67 years.

19 May
A Bell 212 helicopter carrying Iranian President Ebrahim Raisi, Foreign Minister Hossein Amir-Abdollahian, Governor of East Azerbaijan Malek Rahmati, and the Supreme Leader's representative in East Azerbaijan Mohammad Ali Ale-Hashem, crashes near the Iranian city of Varzaqan, East Azerbaijan. There are no survivors.

21 May
A Boeing 777-300ER, operating as Singapore Airlines Flight 321 flying from London to Singapore, encounters severe turbulence, killing 1 passenger and injuring 104 other passengers and crew members. The aircraft is diverted to Bangkok, Thailand.

27 May
Following the closure of Porto Alegre Airport on 3 May for an undetermined time, due to flooding in the Rio Grande do Sul region, Brazilian airlines announces that limited services will be operated from Canoas Air Force Base. A nearby shopping centre hosts check-in and other terminal facilities. A number of aircraft are also damaged. All airport operations will resume on 19 December 2024.

=== June ===
7 June
A Beechcraft T-34 aircraft piloted by former NASA astronaut and United States Air Force pilot, Bill Anders, author of the iconic Earthrise photograph, crashes near the US-Canada border. Anders does not survive the crash.

10 June
A Malawi Air Force Dornier 228, carrying Vice-President of Malawi Saulos Chilima, former First Lady Patricia Shanil Muluzi, and seven other occupants, crashes in Chikangawa Forest Reserve in Mzimba District, killing all nine occupants on board.

26 June
Lufthansa City Airlines begins operations as a subsidiary of Lufthansa Group.

30 June
Boeing announces the acquisition of key supplier Spirit AeroSystems for $4.7 billion, with Airbus set to acquire the Spirit programmes producing major components for Airbus aircraft.

=== July ===
12 July
A Sukhoi Superjet 100-95LR on a ferry flight from Lukhovitsy to Moscow, operating as Gazpromavia Flight 9608, crashes whilst attempting an emergency landing. All three occupants on board are killed.

18 July
Saudia signs a binding sales agreement with Lilium GmbH to purchase 50 electric Lilium Jets, with the option to purchase 50 more.

19 July
During the CrowdStrike incident, 5,078 air flights around the world, amounting to 4.6% of those scheduled that day, are cancelled.

22–26 July
The Farnborough International Airshow is held.

22–28 July
The EAA AirVenture Oshkosh is held at Wittman Regional Airport, located in Oshkosh, Wisconsin, United States.

24 July
A Bombardier CRJ200ER, operated by Saurya Airlines, crashes shortly after takeoff from Kathmandu, Nepal, on a test flight to Pokhara. The pilot is the sole survivor of the crash, which killed 18 people.

30 July
Rex Airlines, Australia's third largest airline, ceases all domestic Boeing 737 jet services and goes into administration.

=== August ===
9 August
An ATR 72-500 operating as Voepass Linhas Aéreas Flight 2283 from Cascavel to São Paulo, crashes in a residential area near Vinhedo, São Paulo killing all 58 passengers and 4 crew members on board.

15 August
Canadian leisure carrier Canada Jetlines ceases operations due to losses and debt.

22 August
Thai Flying Service Flight 209, a Cessna Grand Caravan 208B flying from Suvarnabhumi to Trat, Thailand, crashes into a mangrove forest in Bang Pakong, Chachoengsao, shortly after taking off, killing all nine occupants on board.

28 August
Hundreds of domestic flights are cancelled in southwestern Japan due to Typhoon Shanshan.

29 August
Serbia signs a 2.7 billion dollar contract with France's Dassault Aviation for the purchase of 12 Dassault Rafale fighter jets for the Serbian Air Force.

31 August
A Vitzay-Aero Mil Mi-8 helicopter crashes over the Kamchatka Peninsula, killing all 22 people on board.

=== September ===
1 September
Scandinavian Airlines, one of the founding members of Star Alliance, exits the alliance after 27 years and joins SkyTeam.

13 September
More than 33,000 Boeing machinists go on strike, halting the production of the Boeing 737, Boeing 777 and the Boeing 767 jets.

18 September
Hawaiian Airlines completes its merger with Alaska Airlines but promises to maintain both brands as part of one company.

=== October ===
2 October
A bomb that was dropped by US Forces during World War II exploded under a taxiway at Miyazaki Airport, damaging the surface and disrupting operations.
21 October
An Ilyushin Il-76 is shot down over Darfur, Sudan, by the paramilitary Rapid Support Forces. All five occupants are killed in the subsequent crash.
26 October
After nearly 101 years of operation, Czech Airlines ceases operations and becomes a holding company under its parent company Smartwings.
30 October
Iberia, the flag carrier of Spain, takes delivery of the first Airbus A321XLR as the launch customer for the type. Registered as EC-OIL, this is the first out of eight A321XLRs ordered by Iberia.

=== November ===
9 November
Total Linhas Aéreas Flight 5682, a Boeing 737-4Q8 (SF), caught fire in flight. The aircraft executed an emergency landing at São Paulo/Guarulhos International Airport, São Paulo, Brazil, with both occupants surviving without injuries. The aircraft was destroyed by the fire.

12 November
Vistara merges with Air India and all operations are ceased with all assets transferred.

12–17 November
The China International Aviation & Aerospace Exhibition was held in Zhuhai.

13–15 November
The Bahrain International Airshow was held.

14 November
Iberia operated the first long haul flight of the Airbus A321XLR from Madrid to Boston. The aircraft was delivered to the airline on 30 October.

18 November
Spirit Airlines files for Chapter 11 bankruptcy protection due to losses, debt, competition and failed mergers.

25 November
A Boeing 737-400(SF) operating as Swiftair Flight 5960, from Leipzig, Germany, to Vilnius, Lithuania, on behalf of DHL, crashed near a house on approach to Vilnius. One crew member was killed; no casualties were reported on the ground.

26–28 November
Following the opening of the expansion projects at Nuuk Airport, the bulk of Air Greenland's services were transferred from Kangerlussuaq Airport to Nuuk. On 27 November 2024, the final scheduled Air Greenland flight to Copenhagen using their flagship Airbus A330-800, departed Kangerlussuaq. New services began at Nuuk from 28 November.

29 November
Following a sufficient confidence in the Pakistan Civil Aviation Authority's (PCAA) oversight capabilities, the European Union Aviation Safety Agency (EASA) lifted a four-year-ban on Pakistan International Airlines (PIA) from operating in Europe. The ban was put in effect following the crash of Pakistan International Airlines Flight 8303 in 2020. PIA has stated that they plan on resuming flights to Europe. In concurrence, EASA also lifted its ban on AirBlue.

=== December ===
13 December
Following the identification of serious safety concerns, the European Union Aviation Safety Agency (EASA) formally blacklisted Air Tanzania from operating to and within the European Union (EU), denying the airline a third-country operator authorization (TCO), a requirement for foreign airlines seeking to operate within the EU.

20 December
The Government of Malaysia provisionally agreed to accept a second "no find, no fee" proposal from Texas-based company Ocean Infinity to continue searching for the wreckage of Malaysia Airlines Flight 370 in a new 15,000 square kilometres (5,800 sq mi) site in the Indian Ocean, which was based on new information and data analysis. If the wreckage found is considered to be substantive, Ocean Infinity would receive US$70 million. Speaking at a press conference, Transport minister Anthony Loke stated, "We hope this time will be positive, that the wreckage will be found and give closure to the families."

Turkish Airlines was awarded a Guinness World Record for the most countries flown to by an airline, a record held by the airline since 2012. The award was presented in Chile, following Turkish Airlines' inaugural flight to Arturo Merino Benítez International Airport in Santiago. Turkish Airlines now operates in 131 countries, 120 of them being confirmed as active by Guinness World Records.

22 December
A Piper PA-42 Cheyenne crashed shortly after takeoff at Canela Airport, Brazil, killing all 10 occupants onboard and injuring a further 17 on the ground.

23 December
Swiss International Air Lines Flight 1885, an Airbus A220, flying from Bucharest to Zurich, diverted to Graz after smoke developed in the cabin was in cruise flight at 40,000 feet (FL400). The aircraft was evacuated using the emergency slides, and of the 79 people on board, 1 crew member died in the hospital. An engine failure due to a previously unknown fault pattern was flagged during initial investigations.

25 December
Azerbaijan Airlines Flight 8243, an Embraer E-190AR, was struck by a Russian surface-to-air missile and crashed near Aktau, Kazakhstan, killing 38 of the 67 occupants onboard.

28 December
The Philippine Air Force withdrew the North American OV-10 Bronco from its fleet, the last air force employing them.

29 December
Jeju Air Flight 2216, a Boeing 737-800, overran the runway at Muan, South Korea, and crashed while attempting to belly land. Out of the 181 occupants, 179 were killed; however 2 flight attendants seated at the rear of the plane survived.

30 December
Silver Airways filed for Chapter 11 bankruptcy protection due to losses and debt.

== First flights ==
- 21 February - TAI TF Kaan
- 22 March - Boom XB-1 N990XB

== Ceased operations ==
- 26 February - Lynx Air
- 30 April - Bonza
- 26 May - Tsaradia
- 15 August - Canada Jetlines
- 1 October - AIX Connect
- 26 October - Czech Airlines
- 12 November - Vistara

== Aviation safety ==
In 2015, the all-accident rate was equal to 1.75 per one million flights; in 2024, this number decreased to 1.13. Compared to 2023 in which there were 72 onboard fatalities, 2024 experienced seven fatal commercial accidents and recorded a significant increase of onboard fatalities including 244 onboard deaths with 7 other deaths listed as "other". The surge in fatalities was linked to the crash of Jeju Air Flight 2216 in December 2024. 2024 marked the deadliest year in commercial aviation since 2018.

In 2024, the International Air Transport Association (IATA) recorded over 430,000 cases of GNSS jamming and spoofing. Most of the recorded cases occurred around conflict zones and were mostly related to military activities.

== Deadliest crash ==
The deadliest crash in 2024 occurred when Jeju Air Flight 2216, a Boeing 737-800, overran the runway while performing a belly landing in Muan, South Korea, on 29 December, killing 179 of the 181 passengers and crew on board.
