= List of Boeing 747 variants =

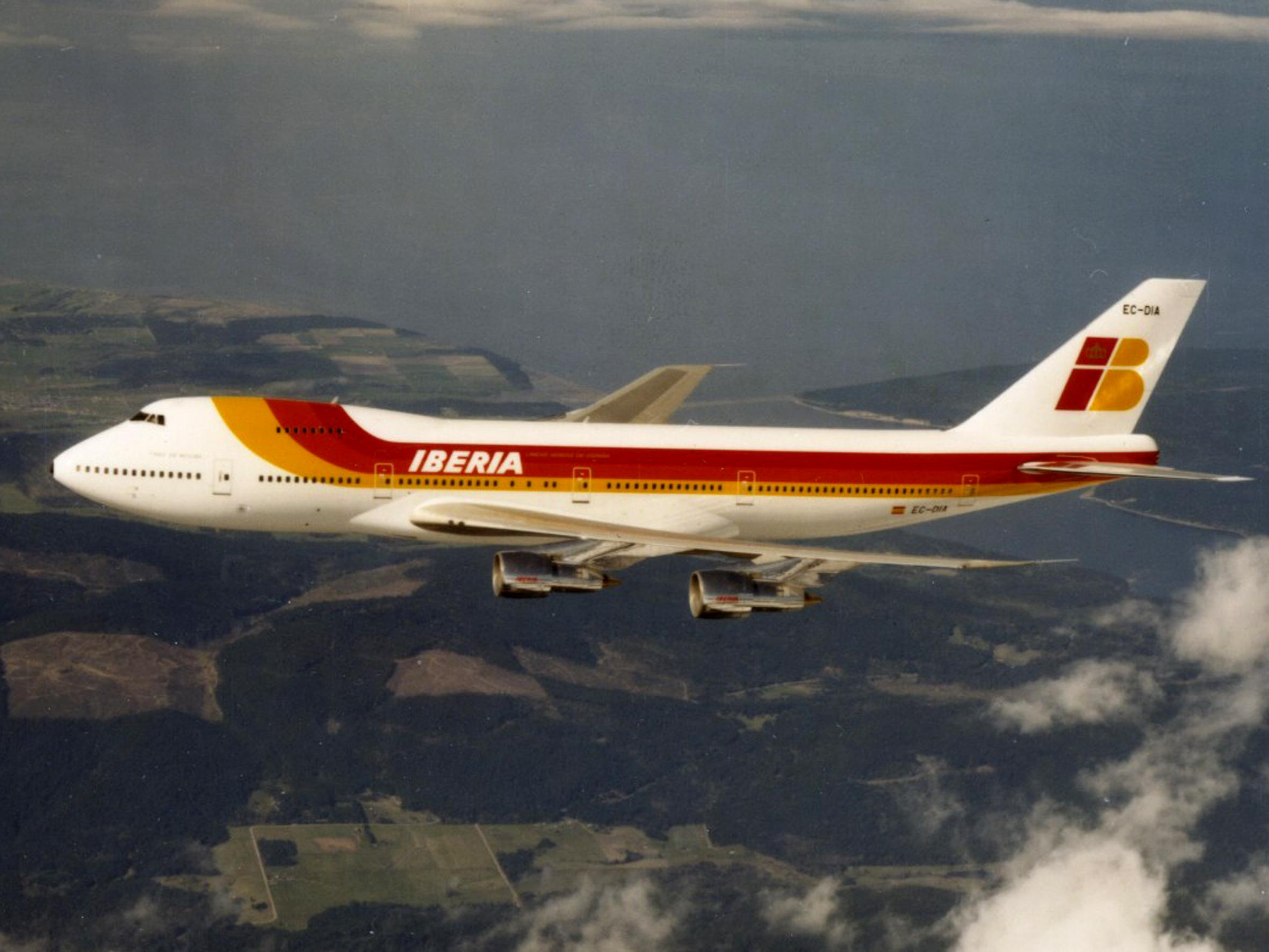
Boeing 747-200 operated by Iberia

The following is a list of variants of the Boeing 747.

The 747-100 with a range of 4,620 nautical miles (8,556 km), was the original variant launched in 1966. The 747-200 soon followed, with its launch in 1968 and the shorter 747SP launched in 1973. The 747-300 was launched in 1980 and was followed by the 747-400 in 1985. The 747-8 was announced in 2005. Several versions of each variant have been produced, and many of the early variants were in production simultaneously. The International Civil Aviation Organization (ICAO) classifies variants using a shortened code formed by combining the model number and the variant designator (e.g. "B741" for all -100 models).

== Classic Generation ==
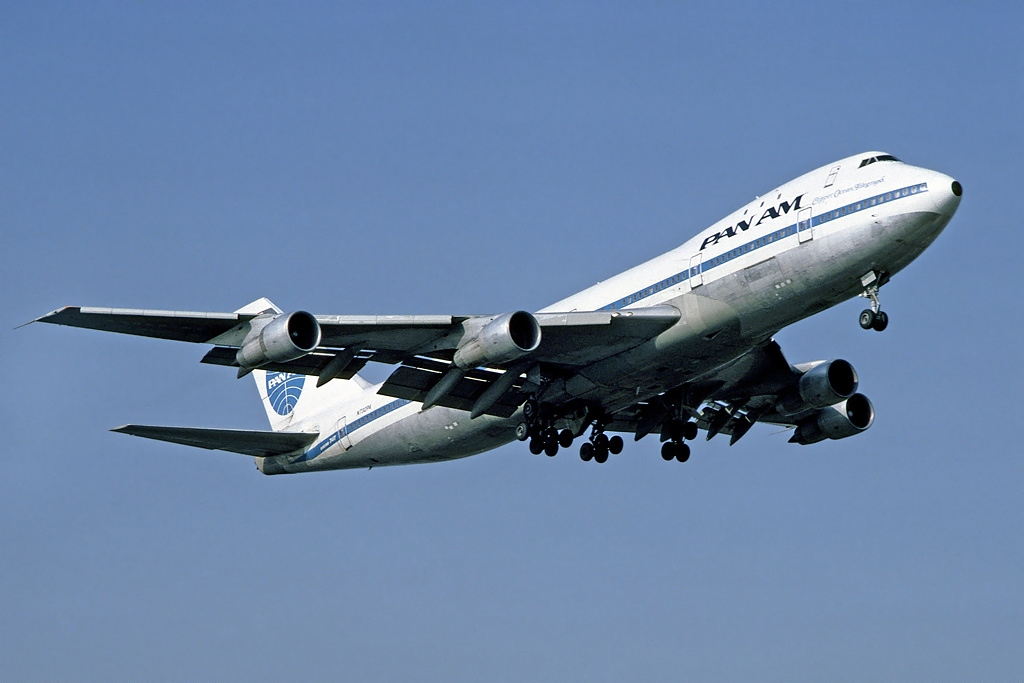
The original 747-100 has a short upper deck with three windows per side; Pan Am introduced it on January 22, 1970

=== 747-100 ===
The first Boeing 747-100s were built with six upper deck windows (three per side) to accommodate upstairs lounge areas. Later, as airlines began to use the upper deck for premium passenger seating instead of lounge space, Boeing offered an upper deck with ten windows on either side as an option, which was first applied on airframes built for United Airlines. Some early -100s were retrofitted with the new configuration. The -100 was equipped with Pratt & Whitney JT9D engines and was compatible with the JT9D-1, -3, -3A, -3W, -7, and -7W variants. No freighter or combi versions of this model were developed, but many 747-100s were converted into freighters designated 747-100(SF), the first of which was delivered to Flying Tiger Line in 1974, while Sabena converted its pair of 747-100s into combi aircraft in April 1974 to carry both passengers and freight on the main deck in response to increased freight loads and as compensation for minimal passenger demand on the airline's Brussels to New York route. A total of 168 747-100s were built; 167 were delivered to customers, while Boeing kept the prototype, City of Everett. In 1972, its unit cost was US$24 million (184.7 million today).

==== 747SR ====
Responding to requests from Japanese airlines for a high-capacity aircraft to serve domestic routes between major cities, Boeing developed the 747SR as a short-range version of the 747-100 with lower fuel capacity and greater payload capability. With increased economy class seating, up to 498 passengers could be carried in early versions and up to 550 in later models. Intended for shorter routes and thus more turn arounds, the 747SR had an economic design life objective of 52,000 flights during 20 years of operation, compared to 24,600 flights in 20 years for the standard 747. The initial 747SR model, the -100SR, had a strengthened body structure and landing gear to accommodate the added stress accumulated from a greater number of takeoffs and landings. Extra structural support was built into the wings, fuselage, and the landing gear along with a 20% reduction in fuel capacity.

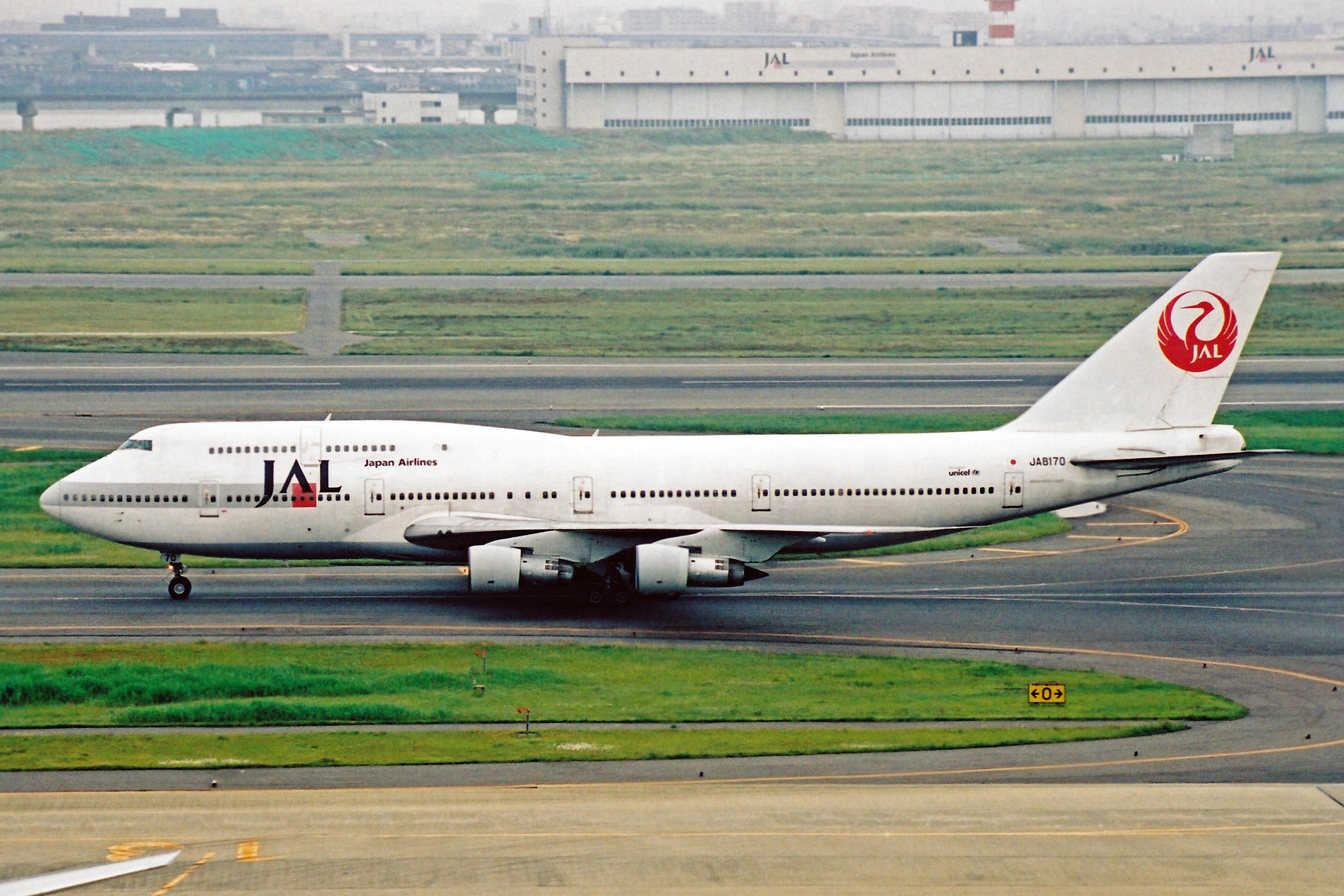
One of the two 747-100BSR with the stretched upper deck (SUD) made for JAL

The initial order for the -100SR – four aircraft for Japan Air Lines (JAL, later Japan Airlines) – was announced on October 30, 1972; rollout occurred on August 3, 1973, and the first flight took place on August 31, 1973. The type was certified by the FAA on September 26, 1973, with the first delivery on the same day. The -100SR entered service with JAL, the type's sole customer, on October 7, 1973, and typically operated flights within Japan. Seven -100SRs were built between 1973 and 1975, each with a 520,000-pound (240 t) MTOW and Pratt & Whitney JT9D-7A engines derated to 43,000 pounds-force (190 kN) of thrust.

Following the -100SR, Boeing produced the -100BSR, a 747SR variant with increased takeoff weight capability. Debuting in 1978, the -100BSR also incorporated structural modifications for a high cycle-to-flying hour ratio; a related standard -100B model debuted in 1979. The -100BSR first flew on November 3, 1978, with first delivery to All Nippon Airways (ANA) on December 21, 1978. A total of 20 -100BSRs were produced for ANA and JAL. The -100BSR had a 600,000 pounds (270 t) MTOW and was powered by the same JT9D-7A or General Electric CF6-45 engines used on the -100SR. ANA operated this variant on domestic Japanese routes with 455 or 456 seats until retiring its last aircraft in March 2006.

In 1986, two -100BSR SUD models, featuring the stretched upper deck (SUD) of the -300, were produced for JAL. The type's maiden flight occurred on February 26, 1986, with FAA certification and first delivery on March 24, 1986. JAL operated the -100BSR SUD with 563 seats on domestic routes until their retirement in the third quarter of 2006. While only two -100BSR SUDs were produced, in theory, standard -100Bs can be modified to the SUD certification. Overall, 29 Boeing 747SRs were built.

==== 747-100B ====
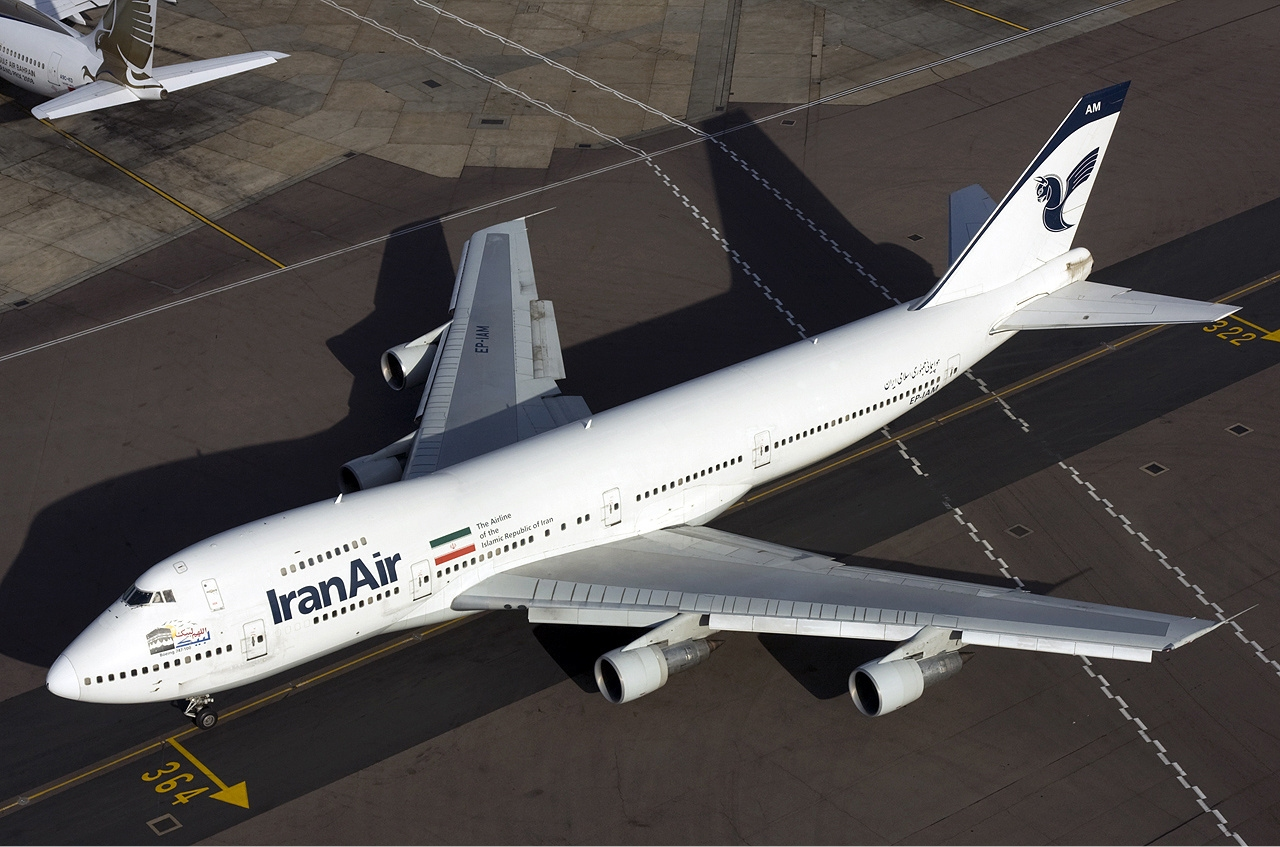
EP-IAM, the sole 747-100B of Iran Air and the last 747-100 in passenger service

The 747-100B model was developed from the -100SR, using its stronger airframe and landing gear design. The type had an increased fuel capacity of 48,070 US gal (182,000 L; 40,030 imp gal), allowing for a 5,000-nautical-mile (9,300 km; 5,800 mi) range with a typical 452-passenger payload, and an increased MTOW of 750,000 lb (340 t) was offered. The first -100B order, one aircraft for Iran Air, was announced on June 1, 1978. This version first flew on June 20, 1979, received FAA certification on August 1, 1979, and was delivered the next day. Nine -100Bs were built, one for Iran Air and eight for Saudi Arabian Airlines. Unlike the original -100, the -100B was offered with Pratt & Whitney JT9D-7A, CF6-50, or Rolls-Royce RB211-524 engines. However, only RB211-524 (Saudia) and JT9D-7A (Iran Air) engines were ordered. The last 747-100B, EP-IAM was retired by Iran Air in 2014, the last commercial operator of the 747-100 and -100B.

=== 747SP ===
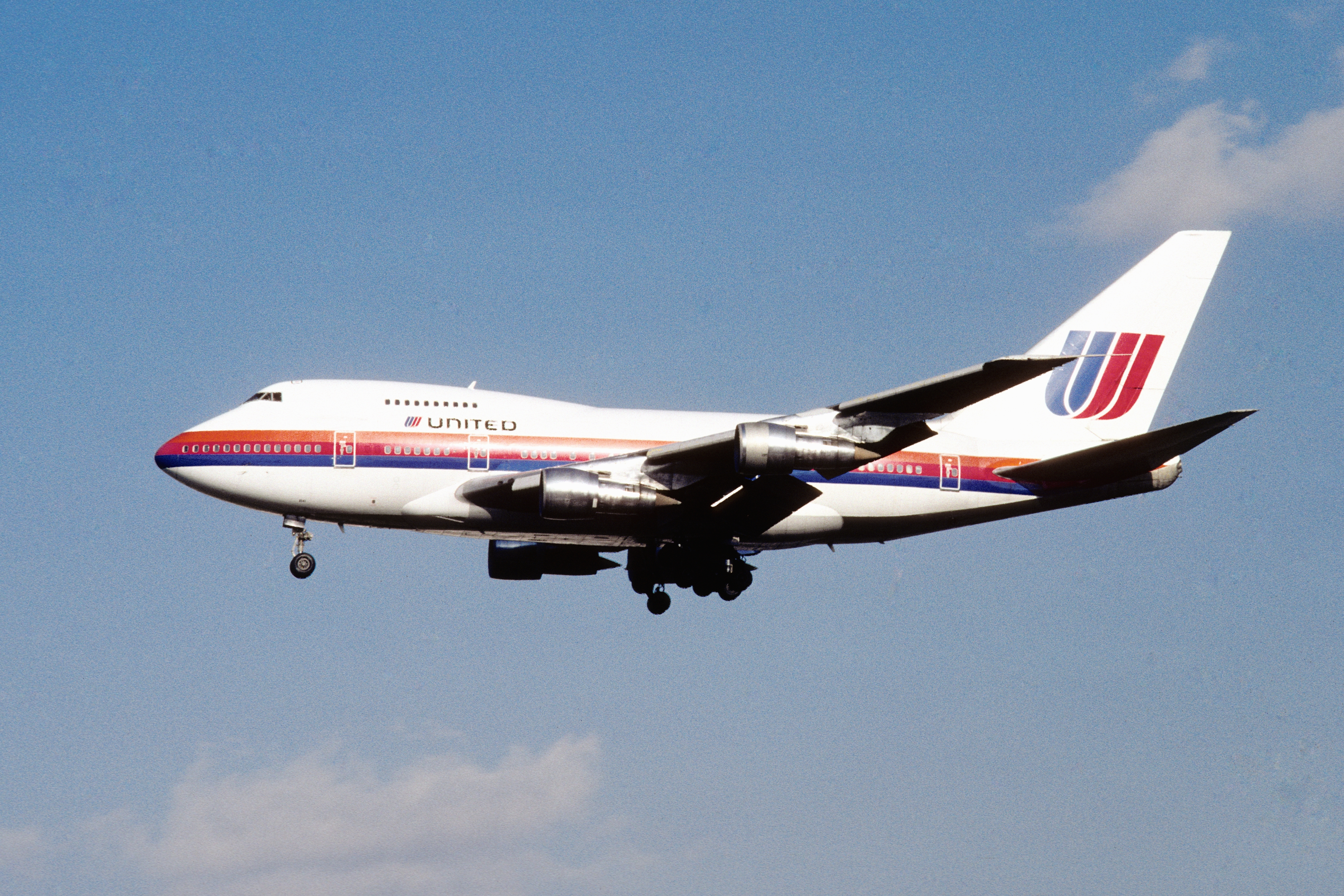
The 747SP was the only 747 model with a shortened fuselage.

The development of the 747SP stemmed from a joint request between Pan American World Airways and Iran Air, who were looking for a high-capacity airliner with enough range to cover Pan Am's New York–Middle Eastern routes and Iran Air's planned Tehran–New York route. The Tehran–New York route, when launched, was the longest non-stop commercial flight in the world. The 747SP is 48 feet 4 inches (14.73 m) shorter than the 747-100. Fuselage sections were eliminated fore and aft of the wing, and the center section of the fuselage was redesigned to fit mating fuselage sections. The SP's flaps used a simplified single-slotted configuration. The 747SP, compared to earlier variants, had a tapering of the aft upper fuselage into the empennage, a double-hinged rudder, and longer vertical and horizontal stabilizers. Power was provided by Pratt & Whitney JT9D-7(A/F/J/FW) or Rolls-Royce RB211-524 engines.

The 747SP was added to the type certificate on February 4, 1976, and entered service with launch customers Pan Am and Iran Air that same year. The aircraft was chosen by airlines wishing to serve major airports with short runways. A total of 45 747SPs were built, with the 44th 747SP delivered on August 30, 1982. In 1987, Boeing re-opened the 747SP production line after five years to build one last 747SP for an order by the United Arab Emirates government. In addition to airline use, one 747SP was modified for the NASA/German Aerospace Center SOFIA experiment. Iran Air, the last civil operator of the type, retired its final 747-SP (EP-IAC) in June 2016.

=== 747-200 ===
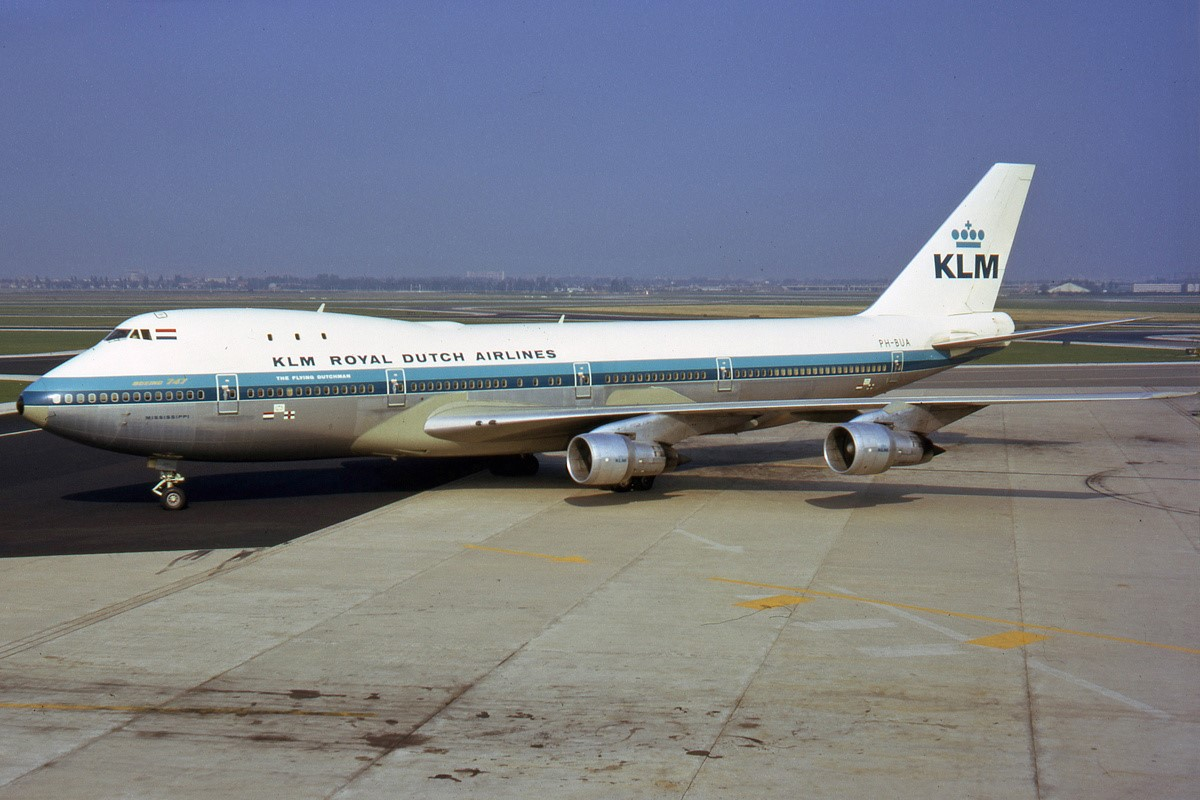
Early 747-200s, like this example of launch customer KLM pictured in 1972, had three windows per side on the upper deck.

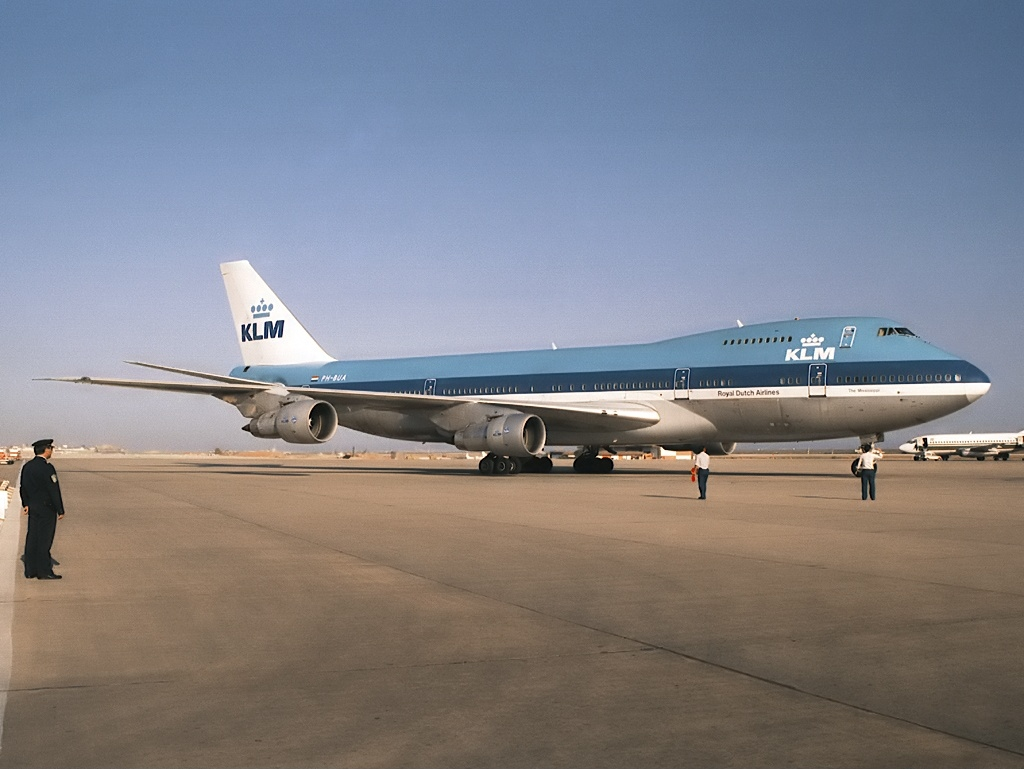
The same aircraft, pictured in 1988, retrofitted with the ten-window upper deck configuration that was standardized later in production. Boeing offered retrofits to apply the ten-window configuration on the upper decks of 747-100s and -200s with the older three-window layout.

While the 747-100 powered by Pratt & Whitney JT9D-3A engines offered enough payload and range for medium-haul operations, it was marginal for long-haul route sectors. The demand for longer-range aircraft with increased payload quickly led to the improved -200, which featured more powerful engines, increased MTOW, and greater range than the -100. The 747-200 was produced in passenger (-200B), freighter (-200F), convertible (-200C), and combi (-200M) versions and was partly influenced by design inputs from the KSSU airline consortium comprising KLM, Scandinavian Airlines, Swissair, and Union de Transports Aériens (UTA).

Externally, the appearance of the 747-200 is identical to that of the earlier 747-100. A few -200s retained the early three-window configuration on the upper deck, but most were built with a ten-window configuration on each side starting with the 147th aircraft built, a 747-200B delivered to Qantas. Retrofits were also offered to apply the ten-window upper deck configuration on early 747s with the three-window configuration.

In its first three years of production beginning in 1970, the -200 was equipped with Pratt & Whitney JT9D-7 engines, initially the only engine available. The -200 was later made compatible with the JT9D-7J, -7Q, -7AW, -70A, and -7R4G2 variants later in its production run.

The -200 was the first 747 to provide a choice of powerplant from the three major engine manufacturers, namely Pratt & Whitney, General Electric, and Rolls-Royce. After launching the -200 with Pratt & Whitney JT9D-7 engines on August 1, 1972, Boeing announced that it had reached an agreement with General Electric to certify the 747 with CF6-50 series engines to increase the aircraft's market potential. The CF6-50 was initially tested on the prototype 747 before the first civilian CF6-powered airframe, a 747-200M, was delivered to KLM in October 1975. The 747-200 was compatible with the CF6-50D and CF6-50E variants.

Rolls-Royce followed 747 engine production with the announcement of the RB211-524B engine as an option for the 747 on June 17, 1975, and a launch order from British Airways for four aircraft, the first of which was delivered to the airline on June 16, 1977. Installation of the RB211 on the 747 had been proposed early in the aircraft's development, around 1967 or 1968, to satisfy the demands of British Overseas Airways Corporation (BOAC), a predecessor of British Airways, for its aircraft to be powered by British-designed engines, but this was not fulfilled until the experimental Hyfil carbon fiber material, which was planned for use in the fan blade assembly, failed a critical test and was discarded in favor of convenetional all-metal materials. The first RB211-powered 747-200 made its maiden flight on September 3, 1976, and received FAA certification in May 1977. Specific variants of the RB211 that were compatible with the 747-200 included the RB211-524B2 and -524C2.

In 1976, its unit cost was US$39M (220.7M today). A total of 393 of the 747-200 versions had been built when production ended in 1991. Of these, 225 were -200B, 73 were -200F, 13 were -200C, 78 were -200M, and 4 were military. Iran Air retired the last passenger 747-200 in May 2016, 36 years after it was delivered. As of July 2019, five 747-200s remain in service as freighters.

==== 747-200B ====
The 747-200B was the basic passenger version, with increased fuel capacity and more powerful engines. The prototype 747-200B, an airframe destined for Northwest Airlines (then known as Northwest Orient), was first flown on October 11, 1970, and received FAA certification three weeks before the first delivery was made on January 16, 1971, to launch customer KLM, which subsequently flew the type's first revenue service the following month on February 14 from Amsterdam to New York.

Range with a full passenger load started at over 5,000 nmi (9,300 km; 5,800 mi) and increased to 6,000 nmi (11,000 km; 6,900 mi) with later engines. Extra fuel tanks were installed on two of the 747-200Bs delivered to Japan Airlines in the 1980s to increase the fuel capacity from 158.8 to 164.1 short tons (144.1 to 148.9 t), enabling them to be used on the airline's nonstop flights between Tokyo and New York. Most -200Bs had an internally stretched upper deck, allowing for up to 16 passenger seats.

==== 747-200F ====
The freighter model, the 747-200F, had a hinged nose cargo door and could be fitted with an optional side cargo door, and had a capacity of 105 short tons (95 t) and an MTOW of up to 833,000 pounds (378 t). The 747-200F was first flown on October 14, 1971, and entered service with Lufthansa in March 1972.

==== 747-200C ====
The convertible version, the 747-200C, could be converted between a passenger and a freighter or used in mixed configurations, and featured removable seats and a nose cargo door. The -200C could also be outfitted with an optional side cargo door on the main deck. The first -200C rolled out of Boeing's Everett factory on February 28, 1973, and made its maiden flight a month later before its delivery to launch customer World Airways on April 27. The 747-200C's unique feature proved to be beneficial for its operators in maintaining profitable 747 operations through switching between configurations depending on the flow of passenger and freight traffic on their networks. For instance, Martinair flew its 747-200Cs in the 1980s and 1990s as passenger aircraft in the summer and as freighters in the winter.

==== 747-200M ====
The combi aircraft model, the 747-200M (originally designated 747-200BC), was based on a configuration first applied in 1974 as a conversion for Sabena's 747-100 fleet and could carry freight in the rear section of the main deck via a side cargo door. A removable partition on the main deck separated the cargo area at the rear from the passengers at the front. The -200M could carry up to 238 passengers in a three-class configuration with cargo carried on the main deck. The model was also known as the 747-200 Combi. The first -200M made its maiden flight on November 18, 1974, and was delivered to Air Canada on March 7, 1975.

==== 747-200SUD ====
As with the 747-100, a stretched upper deck (SUD) modification was offered for the -200 in the 1980s. Between September 1984 and March 1986, all ten of the CF6-powered 747-200s in KLM's fleet were converted with a process that involved removing half of the upper fuselage up to the leading edge of the wing, where the new SUD section would be installed. Two -200 airframes operated by UTA were also modified with the SUD conversion.

=== 747-300 ===
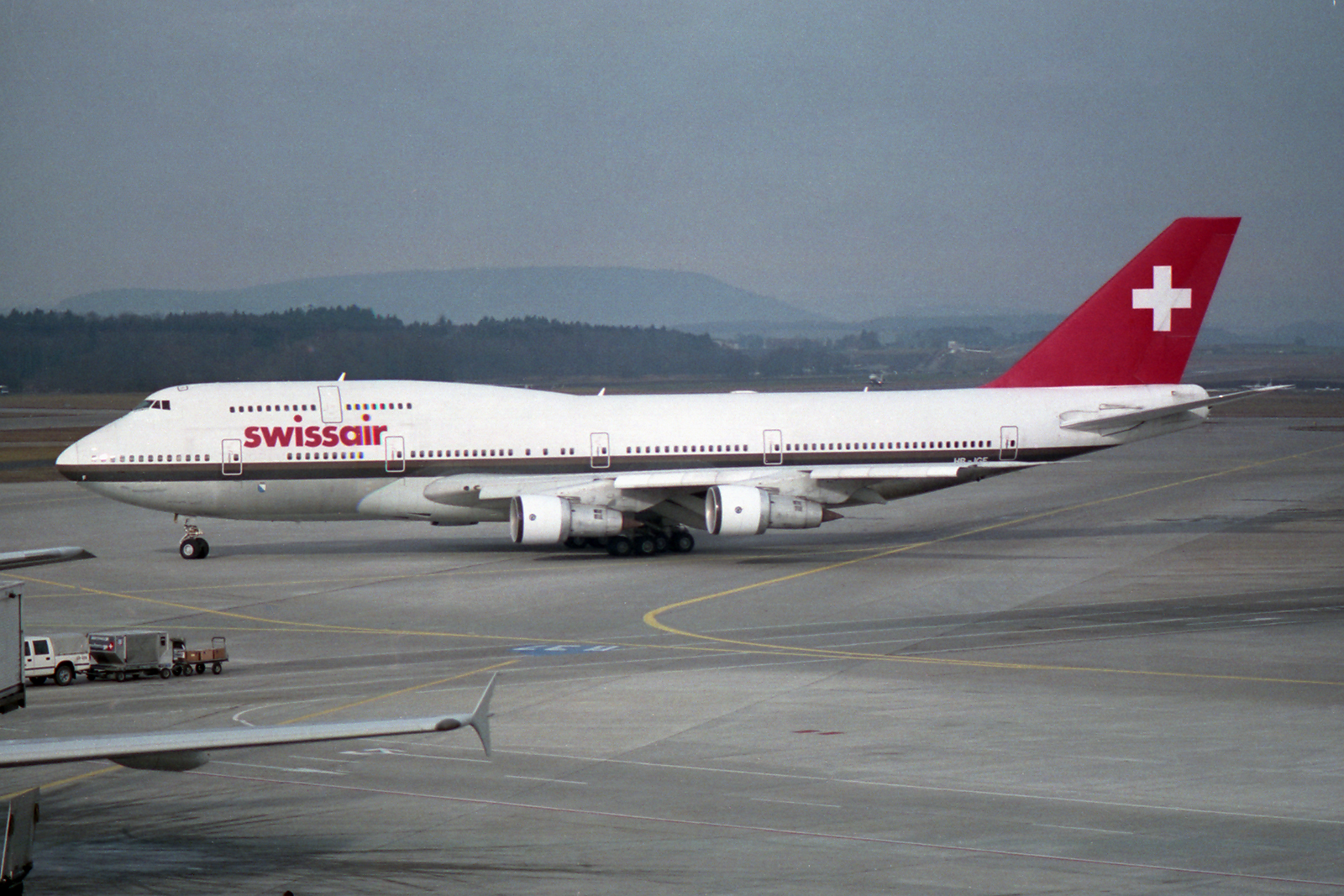
A 747-300, displaying the stretched upper deck. Swissair took the first delivery on March 23, 1983.

The 747-300 features a 23-foot-4-inch-longer (7.11 m) upper deck than the -200. The stretched upper deck (SUD) has two emergency exit doors and is the most visible difference between the -300 and previous models. After being made standard on the 747-300, the SUD was offered as a retrofit, and as an option to earlier variants still in-production. An example for a retrofit were two UTA -200 Combis being converted in 1986, and an example for the option were two brand-new JAL -100 aircraft (designated -100BSR SUD), the first of which was delivered on March 24, 1986.

The 747-300 introduced a new straight stairway to the upper deck, instead of a spiral staircase on earlier variants, which creates room above and below for more seats. Minor aerodynamic changes allowed the -300's cruise speed to reach Mach 0.85 compared with Mach 0.84 on the -200 and -100 models, while retaining the same takeoff weight. The -300 could be equipped with the same Pratt & Whitney and Rolls-Royce powerplants as on the -200, as well as updated General Electric CF6-80C2B1 engines.

Swissair placed the first order for the 747-300 on June 11, 1980. The variant revived the 747-300 designation, which had been previously used on a trijet design study that did not reach production. The 747-300 first flew on October 5, 1982, and the type's first delivery went to Swissair on March 23, 1983. In 1982, its unit cost was US$83M (276.9M today). Besides the passenger model, two other versions (-300M, -300SR) were produced. The 747-300M features cargo capacity on the rear portion of the main deck, similar to the -200M, but with the stretched upper deck it can carry more passengers. The 747-300SR, a short range, high-capacity domestic model, was produced for Japanese markets with a maximum seating for 584. No production freighter version of the 747-300 was built, but Boeing began modifications of used passenger -300 models into freighters in 2000.

A total of 81 747-300 series aircraft were delivered, 56 for passenger use, 21 -300M and 4 -300SR versions. In 1985, just two years after the -300 entered service, the type was superseded by the announcement of the more advanced 747-400. The last 747-300 was delivered in September 1990 to Sabena. While some -300 customers continued operating the type, several large carriers replaced their 747-300s with 747-400s. Air France, Air India, Japan Airlines, Pakistan International Airlines, and Qantas were some of the last major carriers to operate the 747-300. On December 29, 2008, Qantas flew its last scheduled 747-300 service, operating from Melbourne to Los Angeles via Auckland. In July 2015, Pakistan International Airlines retired their final 747-300 after 30 years of service. Mahan Air was the last passenger operator of the 747-300. In 2022, one of their 747-300Ms was leased by Emtrasur Cargo. The 747-300M was later seized by the US Department of Justice in 2024.

== 747-400 ==
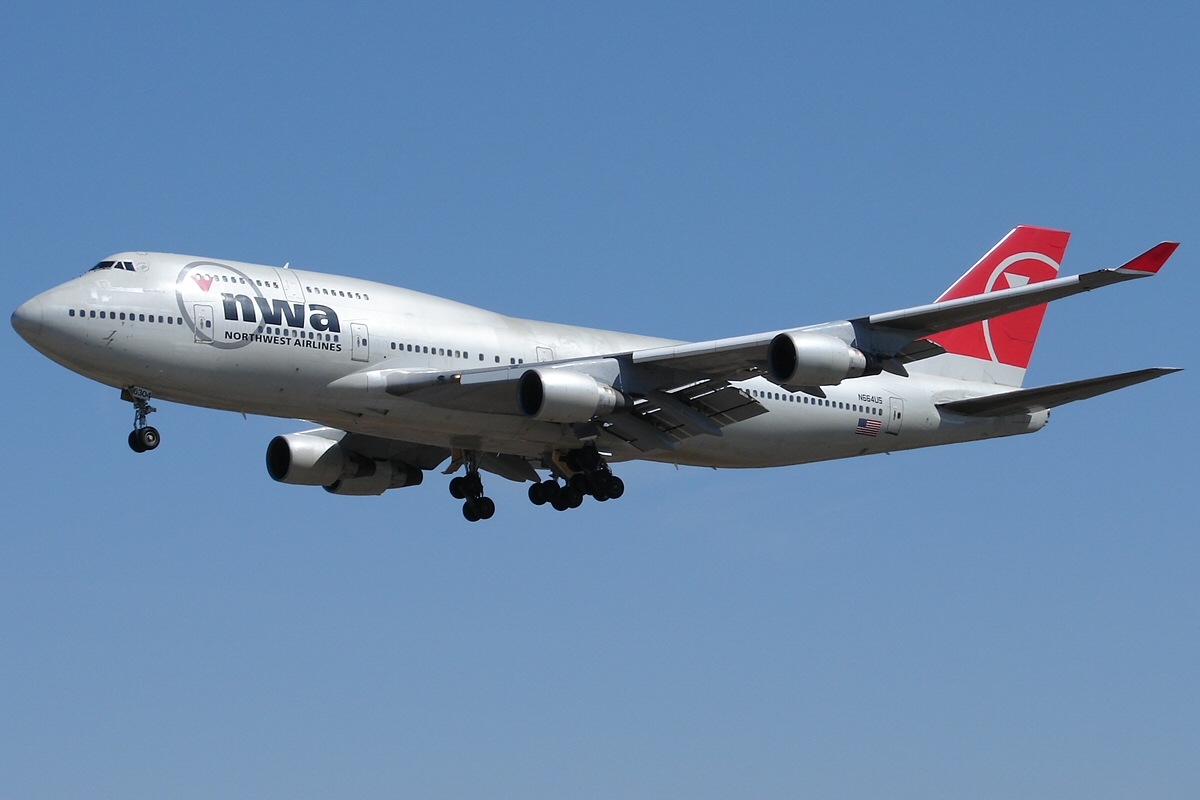
The improved 747-400, featuring canted winglets, entered service in February 1989 with Northwest Airlines

The 747-400 is an improved model with increased range. It has wingtip extensions of 6 ft (1.8 m) and winglets of 6 ft (1.8 m), which improve the type's fuel efficiency by four percent compared to previous 747 versions. The 747-400 introduced a new glass cockpit designed for a flight crew of two instead of three, with a reduction in the number of dials, gauges and knobs from 971 to 365 through the use of electronics. The type also features tail fuel tanks, revised engines, and a new interior. The longer range has been used by some airlines to bypass traditional fuel stops, such as Anchorage. A 747-400 loaded with 126,000 pounds (57,000 kg) of fuel flying 3,500 miles (3,000 nmi; 5,600 km) consumes an average of 5 US gallons per mile (12 L/km). Powerplants include the Pratt & Whitney PW4062, General Electric CF6-80C2, and Rolls-Royce RB211-524. As a result of the Boeing 767 development overlapping with the 747-400's development, both aircraft can use the same three powerplants and are even interchangeable between the two aircraft models.

The -400 was offered in passenger (-400), freighter (-400F), combi (-400M), domestic (-400D), extended range passenger (-400ER), and extended range freighter (-400ERF) versions. Passenger versions retain the same upper deck as the -300, while the freighter version does not have an extended upper deck. The 747-400D was designed for short-range operations with maximum seating for 624. So winglets were not included though they can be retrofitted. Cruising speed is up to Mach 0.855 on different versions of the 747-400.

The passenger version first entered service in February 1989 with launch customer Northwest Airlines on the Minneapolis to Phoenix route. The combi version entered service in September 1989 with KLM, while the freighter version entered service in November 1993 with Cargolux. The 747-400ERF entered service with Air France in October 2002, while the 747-400ER entered service with Qantas, its sole customer, in November 2002. In January 2004, Boeing and Cathay Pacific launched the 747-400 Special Freighter program, later referred to as the Boeing Converted Freighter (BCF), to modify passenger 747-400s for cargo use. The first 747-400BCF was redelivered in December 2005.

In March 2007, Boeing announced that it had no plans to produce further passenger versions of the -400. However, orders for 36 -400F and -400ERF freighters were already in place at the time of the announcement. The last passenger version of the 747-400 was delivered in April 2005 to China Airlines. Some of the last built 747-400s were delivered with Dreamliner livery along with the modern Signature interior from the Boeing 777. A total of 694 of the 747-400 series aircraft were delivered. At various times, the largest 747-400 operator has included Singapore Airlines, Japan Airlines, and British Airways. As of July 2019, 331 Boeing 747-400s were in service; there were only 10 Boeing 747-400s in passenger service as of September 2021.

=== 747 LCF Dreamlifter ===
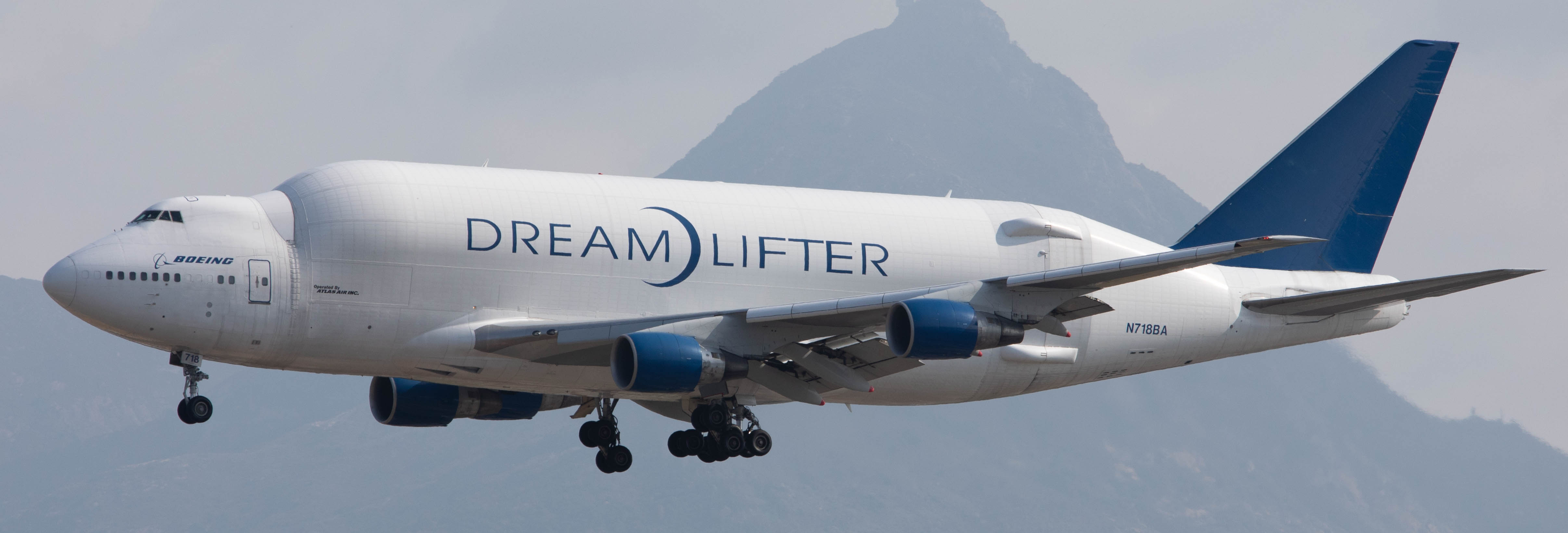
The Boeing Dreamlifter, a modified 747-400, first flew on September 9, 2006

The 747-400 Dreamlifter (originally called the 747 Large Cargo Freighter or LCF) is a Boeing-designed modification of existing 747-400s into a larger outsize cargo freighter configuration to ferry 787 Dreamliner sub-assemblies. Evergreen Aviation Technologies Corporation of Taiwan was contracted to complete modifications of 747-400s into Dreamlifters in Taoyuan. The aircraft flew for the first time on September 9, 2006, in a test flight. Modification of four aircraft was completed by February 2010. The Dreamlifters have been placed into service transporting sub-assemblies for the 787 program to the Boeing plant in Everett, Washington, for final assembly. The aircraft is certified to carry only essential crew with no passengers.

== 747-8 ==
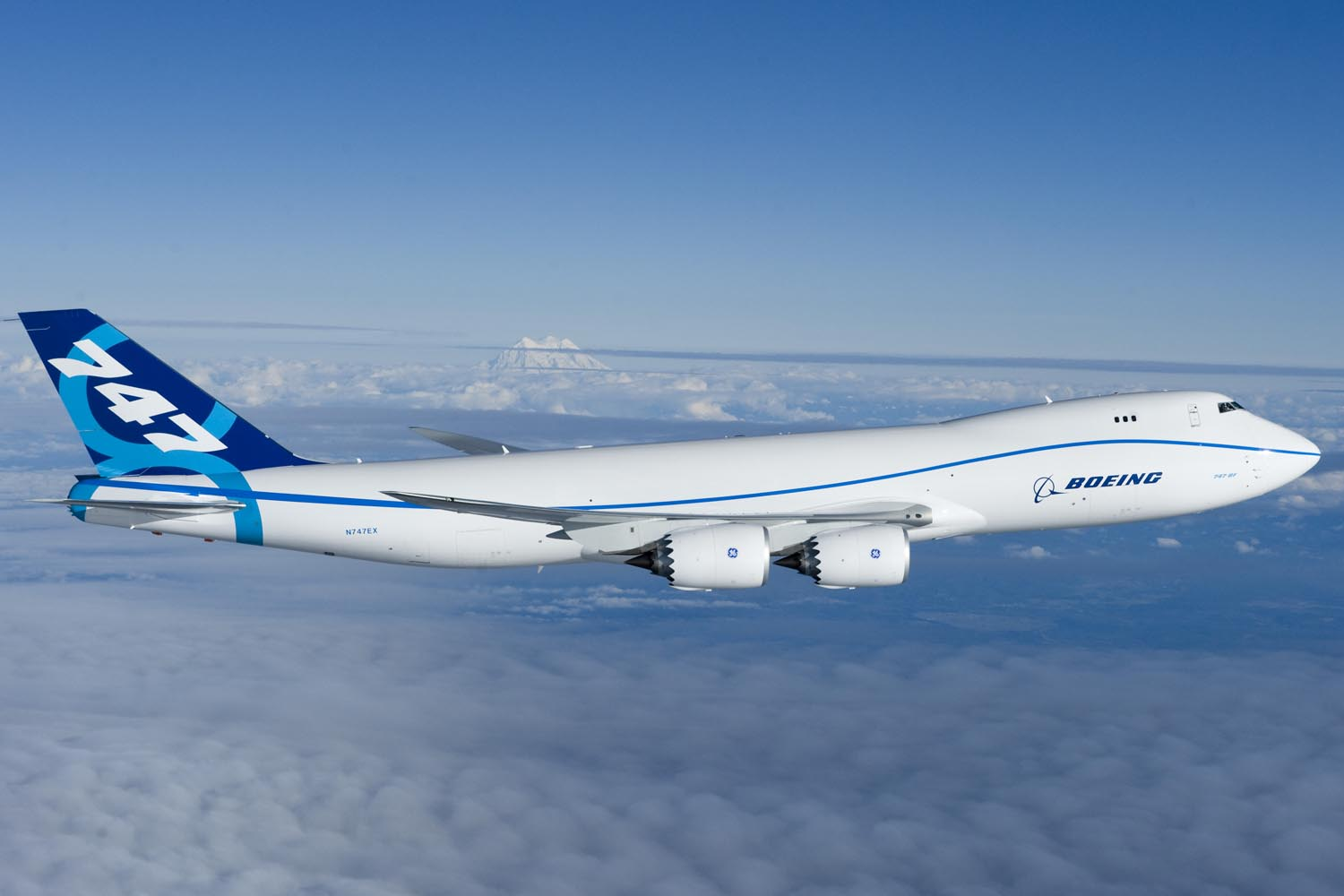
The stretched and re-engined 747-8 made its maiden flight on February 8, 2010, as a freighter

Boeing announced a new 747 variant, the 747-8, on November 14, 2005. Referred to as the 747 Advanced prior to its launch, Boeing selected the designation 747-8 to show the connection with the Boeing 787 Dreamliner, as the aircraft would use technology and the General Electric GEnx engines from the 787 to modernize the design and its systems. The variant is designed to be quieter, more economical, and more environmentally friendly. The 747-8's fuselage is lengthened from 232 feet (71 m) to 251 feet (77 m), marking the first stretch variant of the aircraft.

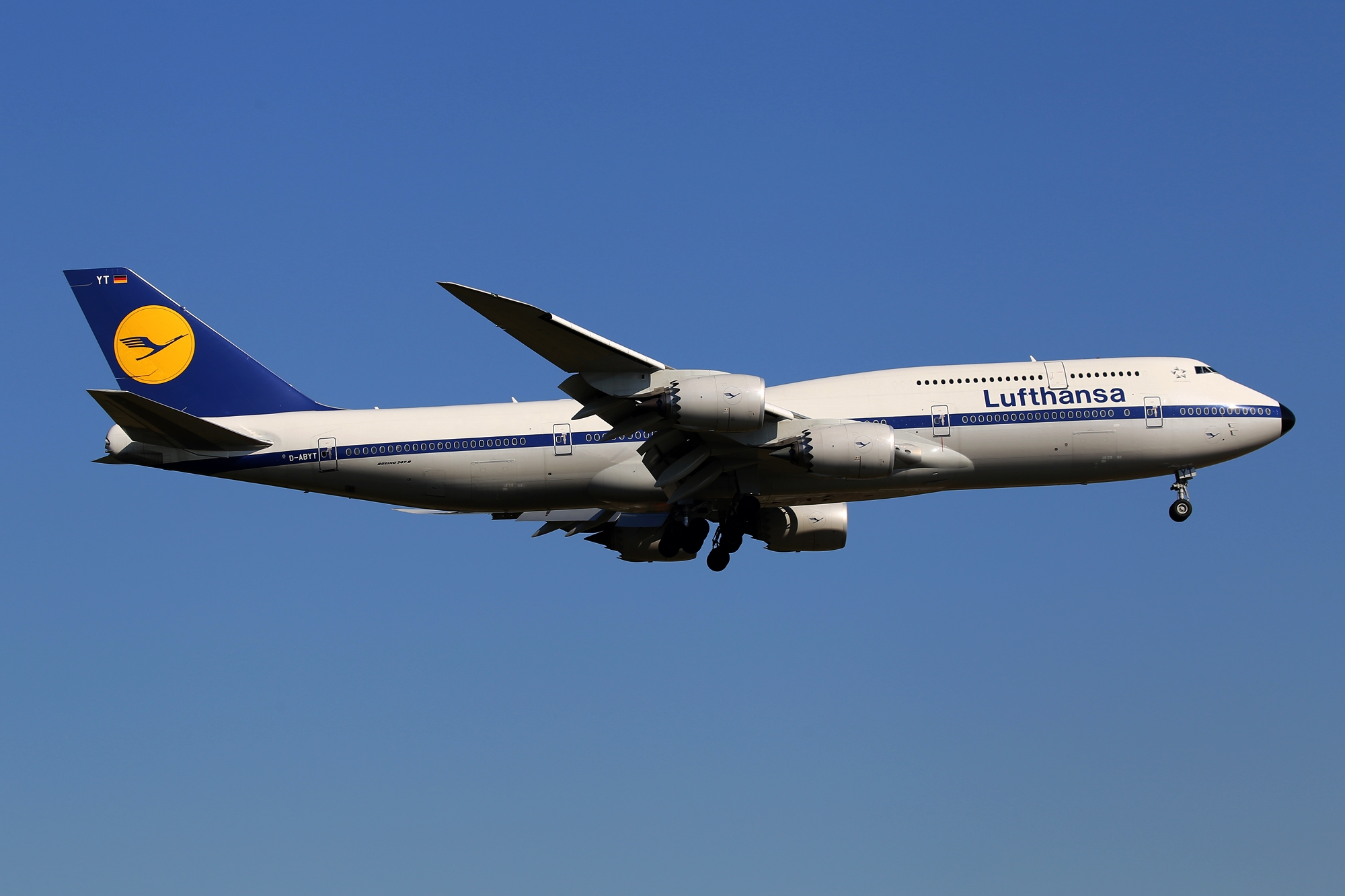
A 747-8I, the passenger variant of the -8 series, of launch customer Lufthansa. This example is painted with a retro livery modeled after the livery worn by Lufthansa's 747 fleet from the 1970s to 1980s.

The 747-8 Freighter, or 747-8F, has 16% more payload capacity than its predecessor, allowing it to carry seven more standard air cargo containers, with a maximum payload capacity of 154 short tons (140 t) of cargo. As on previous 747 freighters, the 747-8F features a flip up nose-door, a side-door on the main deck, and a side-door on the lower deck ("belly") to aid loading and unloading. The 747-8F made its maiden flight on February 8, 2010. The variant received its amended type certificate jointly from the FAA and the European Aviation Safety Agency (EASA) on August 19, 2011. The -8F was first delivered to Cargolux on October 12, 2011.

The passenger version, named 747-8 Intercontinental or 747-8I, is designed to carry up to 467 passengers in a 3-class configuration and fly more than 8,000 nautical miles (15,000 km; 9,200 mi) at Mach 0.855. As a derivative of the already common 747-400, the 747-8I has the economic benefit of similar training and interchangeable parts. The type's first test flight occurred on March 20, 2011. The 747-8 has surpassed the Airbus A340-600 as the world's longest airliner, a record it would hold until the 777X, which first flew in 2020. The first -8I was delivered in May 2012 to Lufthansa. The 747-8 received 155 total orders, including 106 for the -8F and 47 for the -8I as of June 2021. The final 747-8F was delivered to Atlas Air on January 31, 2023, marking the end of the production of the Boeing 747 series. The final aircraft was registered as N863GT.

== Government, military, and other variants ==
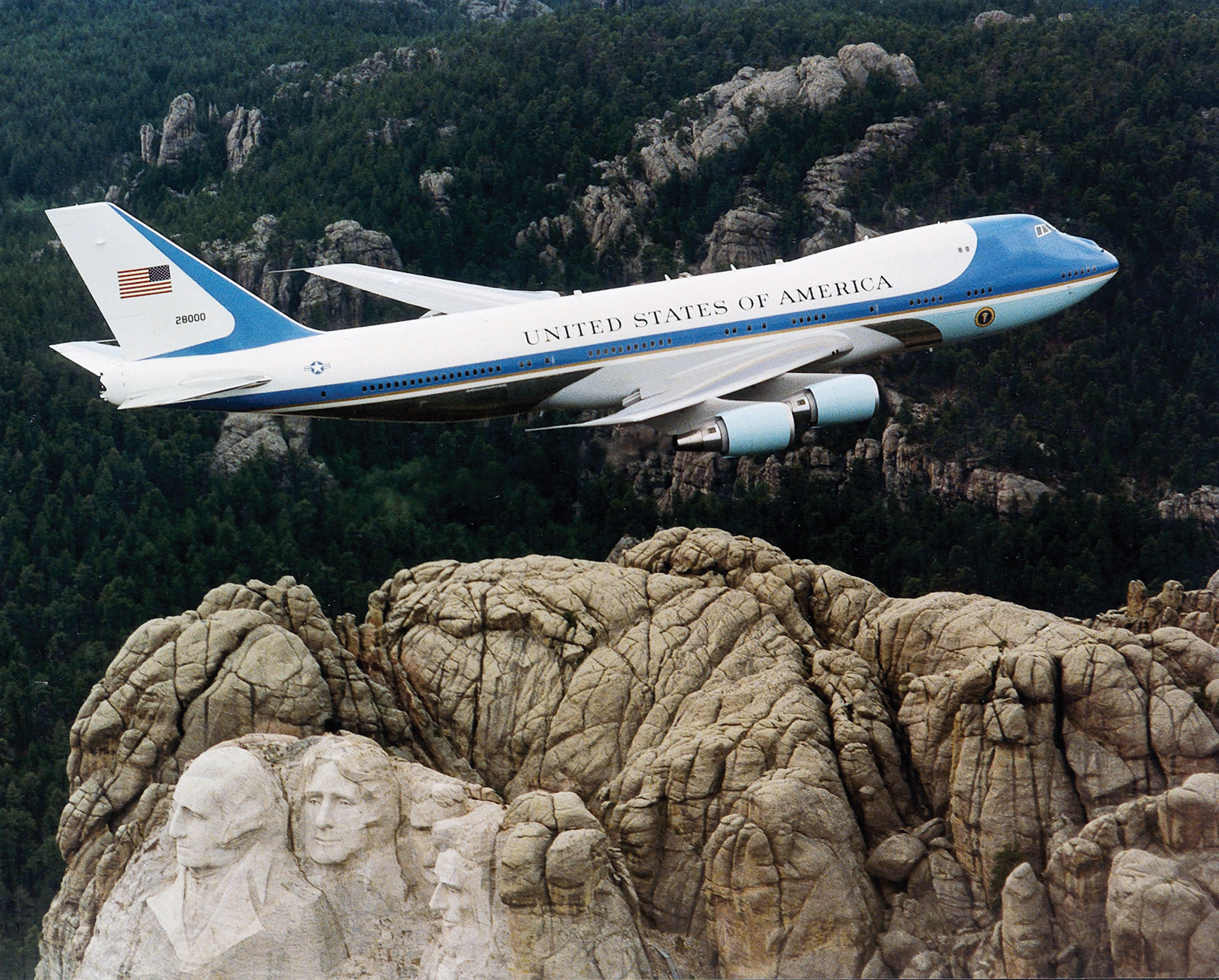
Air Force One, a Boeing VC-25, over Mount Rushmore

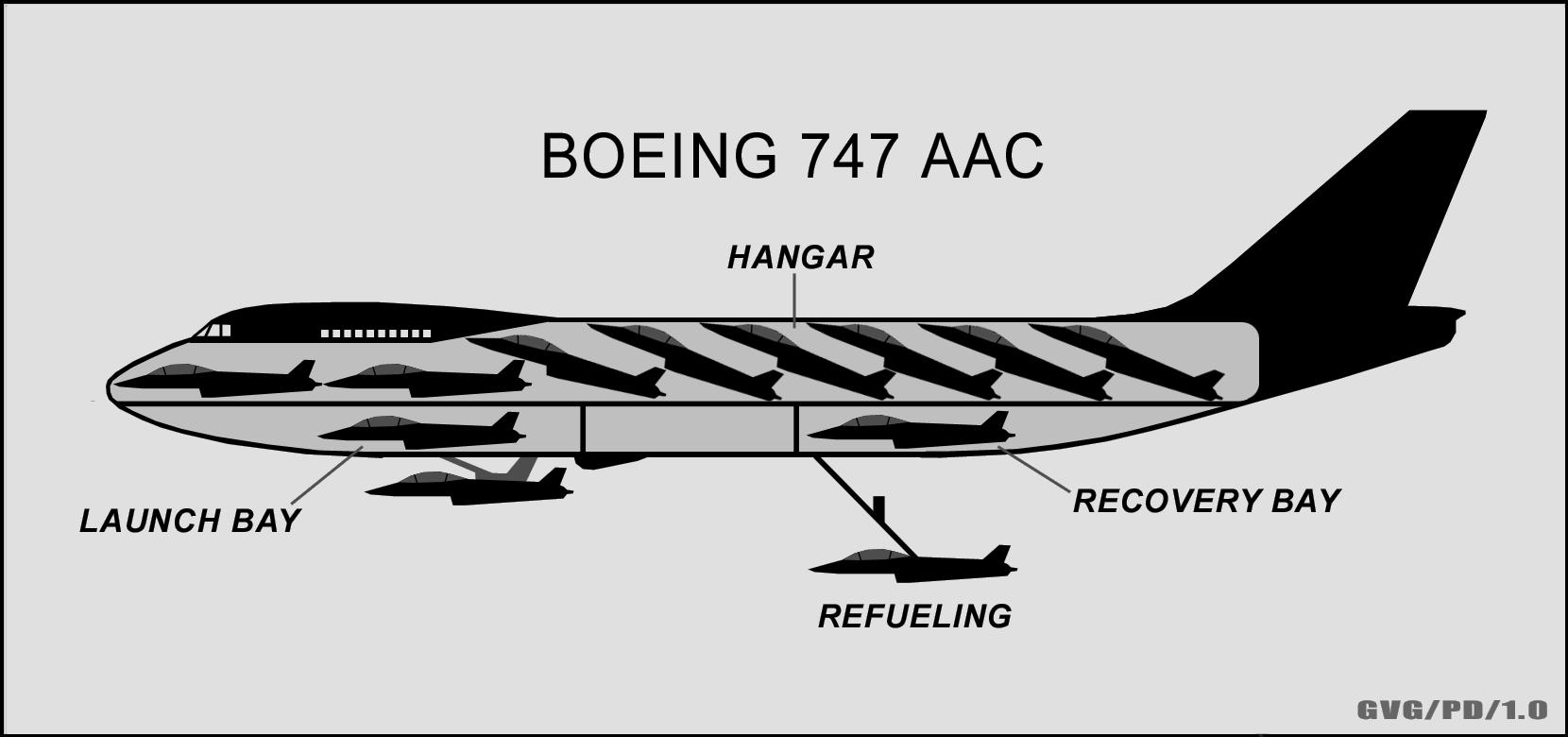
747 "airborne aircraft carrier" concept

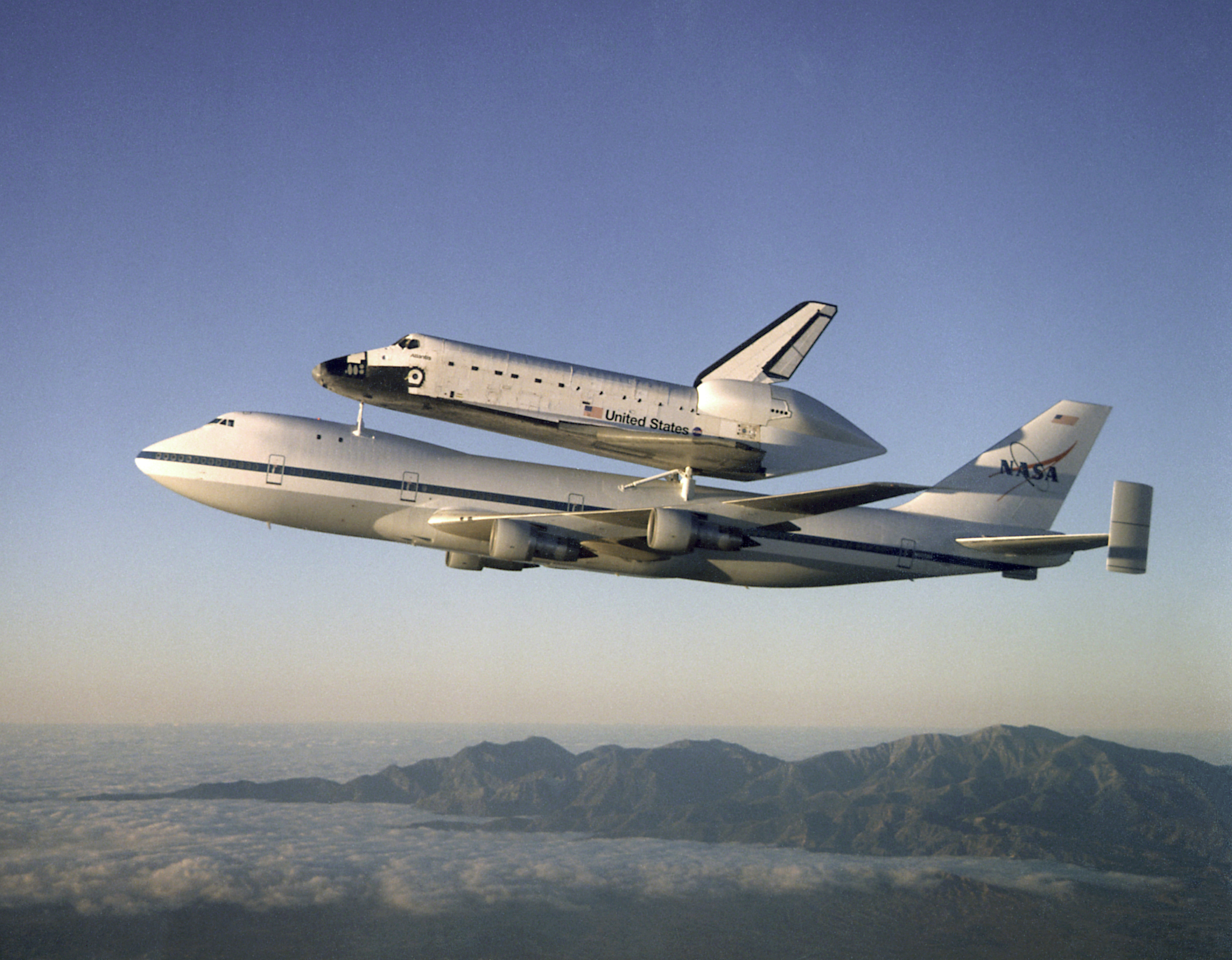
Shuttle Carrier Aircraft carrying a Space Shuttle orbiter

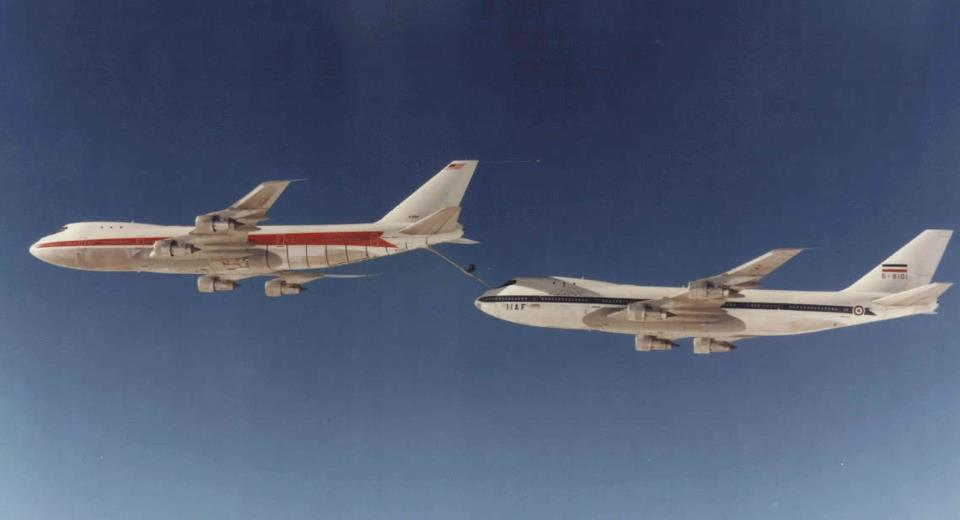
Imperial Iranian Air Force (IIAF) KC-747 tanker refueling a standard IIAF 747-100F. The KC-747 is still wearing the livery of its former operator, TWA.

- VC-25 – This aircraft is the U.S. Air Force very important person (VIP) version of the 747-200B. The U.S. Air Force operates two of them in VIP configuration as the VC-25A. Tail numbers 28000 and 29000 are popularly known as Air Force One, which is technically the air-traffic call sign for any United States Air Force aircraft carrying the U.S. president. Partially completed aircraft from Everett, Washington, were flown to Wichita, Kansas, for final outfitting by Boeing Military Airplane Company. Two new aircraft, based around the 747-8, are being procured which will be designated as VC-25B.
- E-4B – This is an airborne command post designed for use in nuclear war. Three E-4As, based on the 747-200B, with a fourth aircraft, with more powerful engines and upgraded systems delivered in 1979 as an E-4B, with the three E-4As upgraded to this standard. Formerly known as the National Emergency Airborne Command Post (referred to colloquially as "Kneecap"), this type is now referred to as the National Airborne Operations Center (NAOC).
  - Survivable Airborne Operations Center - In April 2024, Sierra Nevada Corporation was awarded a contract to develop and build the Survivable Airborne Operations Center aircraft to replace the Boeing E-4 NAOC. Five 747-8Is were purchased from Korean Air for conversion, with the contract calling for nine in total.
- YAL-1 – This was the experimental Airborne Laser, a planned component of the U.S. National Missile Defense.
- Shuttle Carrier Aircraft (SCA) – Two 747s were modified to carry the Space Shuttle orbiter. The first was a 747-100 (N905NA), and the other was a 747-100SR (N911NA). The first SCA carried the prototype Enterprise during the Approach and Landing Tests in the late 1970s. The two SCA later carried all five operational Space Shuttle orbiters.
- C-33 – This aircraft was a proposed U.S. military version of the 747-400F intended to augment the C-17 fleet. The plan was canceled in favor of additional C-17s.
- KC-25/33 – A proposed 747-200F was also adapted as an aerial refueling tanker and was bid against the DC-10-30 during the 1970s Advanced Cargo Transport Aircraft (ACTA) program that produced the KC-10 Extender. Before the 1979 Iranian Revolution, Iran bought four 747-100 aircraft with air-refueling boom conversions to support its fleet of F-4 Phantoms and F-14 Tomcats. The last of the Iranian tankers was claimed to be destroyed by the Israeli Air Force (IAF) during Operation Rising Lion in June 2025. Since then, there have been proposals to use a 747-400 for that role.
- 747F Airlifter – Proposed US military transport version of the 747-200F intended as an alternative to further purchases of the C-5 Galaxy. This 747 would have had a special nose jack to lower the sill height for the nose door. System tested in 1980 on a Flying Tiger Line 747-200F.
- 747 CMCA – This "Cruise Missile Carrier Aircraft" variant was considered by the U.S. Air Force during the development of the B-1 Lancer strategic bomber. It would have been equipped with 50 to 100 AGM-86 ALCM cruise missiles on rotary launchers. This plan was abandoned in favor of more conventional strategic bombers.
- MC-747 – Two separate studies from the 1970s and 2005, the first by Boeing and the second by ATK and BAE Systems, to horizontally store up to four Peacekeeper ICBMs or seven Minutemen above bomb bay-like doors in the first study, and to vertically store twelve Minutemen or 32 JDAM-equipped conventional missiles for launch from in situ tubes in the second.
- 747 AAC – A Boeing study under contract from the USAF for an "airborne aircraft carrier" for up to 10 Boeing Model 985-121 "microfighters" with the ability to launch, retrieve, re-arm, and refuel. Boeing believed that the scheme would be able to deliver a flexible and fast carrier platform with global reach, particularly where other bases were not available. Modified versions of the 747-200 and Lockheed C-5A were considered as the base aircraft. The concept, which included a complementary 747 AWACS version with two reconnaissance "microfighters", was considered technically feasible in 1973.
- Evergreen 747 Supertanker – A 747-200 modified as an aerial application platform for fire fighting using 20,000 US gallons (76,000 L; 17,000 imp gal) of firefighting chemicals.
- Stratospheric Observatory for Infrared Astronomy (SOFIA) – A former Pan Am 747SP modified to carry a large infrared-sensitive telescope, in a joint venture of NASA and DLR. High altitudes are needed for infrared astronomy, to rise above infrared-absorbing water vapor in the atmosphere.
- N747GE, a testbed aircraft used by General Electric where a tested engine variant is mounted in place of one engine.
- A number of other governments also use the 747 as a VIP transport, including Bahrain, Brunei, India, Iran, Japan, Kuwait, Oman, Pakistan, Qatar, Saudi Arabia and United Arab Emirates. Several 747-8s have been ordered by Boeing Business Jet for conversion to VIP transports for several unidentified customers.

== Comparison ==
Below is a list of major differences between the original 747 variants.

Model	747-100	747-200B	747-300
Typical seats	366		400
MTOW	735,000–750,000 lb (333.4–340.2 t)	775,000–833,000 lb (351.5–377.8 t)	
OEW	358,000–381,480 lb (162.39–173.04 t)	376,170–388,010 lb (170.63–176.00 t)	384,240–402,700 lb (174.29–182.66 t)
Fuel capacity	47,210–48,445 US gal (178,710–183,380 L; 39,311–40,339 imp gal)	52,035–52,410 US gal (196,970–198,390 L; 43,328–43,640 imp gal)	
Turbofan (×4)	Pratt & Whitney JT9D or Rolls-Royce RB211 or General Electric CF6		
Thrust (×4)	43,500–51,600 lbf (193–230 kN)	46,300–54,750 lbf (206.0–243.5 kN)	46,300–56,900 lbf (206–253 kN)
Range	4,620 nmi (8,560 km; 5,320 mi) (Note: JT9D, 366 passengers and baggage)	6,560 nmi (12,150 km; 7,550 mi)	6,330 nmi (11,720 km; 7,280 mi) (Note: 400 passengers and baggage)
Takeoff	10,650 ft (3,250 m)	10,900 ft (3,300 m)	10,900 ft (3,300 m)

== Proposed variants ==
Boeing studied a number of 747 variants that did not advance beyond the concept stage.

=== 747 trijet ===
During the late 1960s and early 1970s, Boeing studied the development of a shorter 747 with three engines, to compete with the smaller Lockheed L-1011 TriStar and McDonnell Douglas DC-10. The center engine would have been fitted in the tail with an S-duct intake similar to the Boeing 727; an S-duct center engine was also employed on the L-1011. Overall, the 747 trijet would have had more payload, range, and passenger capacity than either of the two other aircraft. However, engineering studies showed that a major redesign of the 747 wing would be necessary. Maintaining the same 747 handling characteristics would be important to minimize pilot retraining. Boeing decided instead to pursue a shortened four-engine 747, resulting in the 747SP.

=== 747-500 ===
In January 1986, Boeing outlined preliminary studies to build a larger, ultra-long haul version named the 747-500, which would enter service in the mid- to late-1990s. The aircraft derivative would use engines evolved from unducted fan (UDF) (propfan) technology by General Electric, but the engines would have shrouds, sport a bypass ratio of 15–20, and have a propfan diameter of 10–12 feet (3.0–3.7 m). The aircraft would be stretched (including the upper deck section) to a capacity of 500 seats, have a new wing to reduce drag, cruise at a faster speed to reduce flight times, and have a range of at least 10,000 mi (8,700 nmi; 16,000 km), which would allow airlines to fly nonstop between London, UK and Sydney, Australia.

=== 747 ASB ===
Boeing announced the 747 ASB (Advanced Short Body) in 1986 as a response to the Airbus A340 and the McDonnell Douglas MD-11. This aircraft design would have combined the advanced technology used on the 747-400 with the foreshortened 747SP fuselage. The aircraft was to carry 295 passengers over a range of 8,000 nmi (15,000 km; 9,200 mi). However, airlines were not interested in the project and it was canceled later that year.

=== 747-500X, -600X, and -700X ===
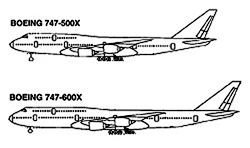
The proposed 747-500X and -600X as depicted in a 1998 FAA illustration

Boeing announced the 747-500X and -600X at the 1996 Farnborough Airshow. The proposed models would have combined the 747's fuselage with a new wing spanning 251 feet (77 m) derived from the 777. Other changes included adding more powerful engines and increasing the number of tires from two to four on the nose landing gear and from 16 to 20 on the main landing gear.

The 747-500X concept featured a fuselage length increased by 18 feet (5.5 m) to 250 feet (76 m), and the aircraft was to carry 462 passengers over a range up to 8,700 nautical miles (16,100 km; 10,000 mi), with a gross weight of over 1.0 Mlb (450 tonnes). The 747-600X concept featured a greater stretch to 279 feet (85 m) with seating for 548 passengers, a range of up to 7,700 nmi (14,300 km; 8,900 mi), and a gross weight of 1.2 Mlb (540 tonnes). A third study concept, the 747-700X, would have combined the wing of the 747-600X with a widened fuselage, allowing it to carry 650 passengers over the same range as a 747-400. The cost of the changes from previous 747 models, especially the new wing for the 747-500X and -600X, was estimated to be more than US$5 billion. Boeing was not able to attract enough interest to launch the aircraft.

=== 747X and 747X Stretch ===
As Airbus progressed with its A3XX study, Boeing offered a 747 derivative as an alternative in 2000; a more modest proposal than the previous -500X and -600X with the 747's overall wing design and a new segment at the root, increasing the span to 229 ft (69.8 m). Power would have been supplied by either the Engine Alliance GP7172 or the Rolls-Royce Trent 600, which were also proposed for the 767-400ERX. A new flight deck based on the 777's would be used. The 747X aircraft was to carry 430 passengers over ranges of up to 8,700 nmi (16,100 km; 10,000 mi). The 747X Stretch would be extended to 263 ft (80.2 m) long, allowing it to carry 500 passengers over ranges of up to 7,800 nmi (14,400 km; 9,000 mi). Both would feature an interior based on the 777. Freighter versions of the 747X and 747X Stretch were also studied.

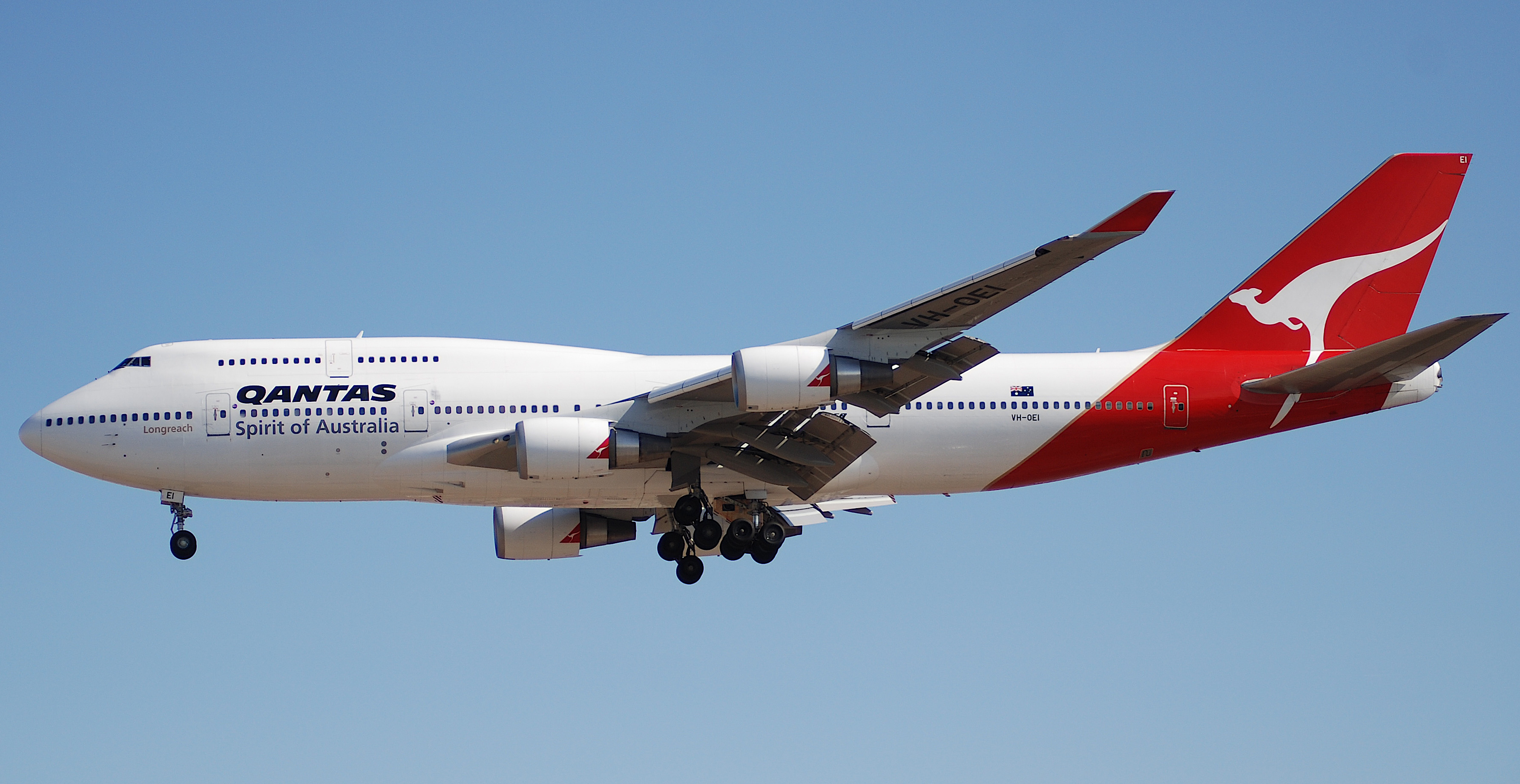
The 747-400ER was derived from the 747-400X study.

Like its predecessor, the 747X family was unable to garner enough interest to justify production, and it was shelved along with the 767-400ERX in March 2001, when Boeing announced the Sonic Cruiser concept. Though the 747X design was less costly than the 747-500X and -600X, it was criticized for not offering a sufficient advance from the existing 747-400. The 747X did not make it beyond the drawing board, but the 747-400X being developed concurrently moved into production to become the 747-400ER.

=== 747-400XQLR ===
After the end of the 747X program, Boeing continued to study improvements that could be made to the 747. The 747-400XQLR (Quiet Long Range) was meant to have an increased range of 7,980 nmi (14,780 km; 9,180 mi), with improvements to boost efficiency and reduce noise. Improvements studied included raked wingtips similar to those used on the 767-400ER and a sawtooth engine nacelle for noise reduction. Although the 747-400XQLR did not move to production, many of its features were used for the 747 Advanced, which was launched as the 747-8 in 2005.
