= Swiss International Air Lines Flight 1885 =

2024 aviation accident in Austria

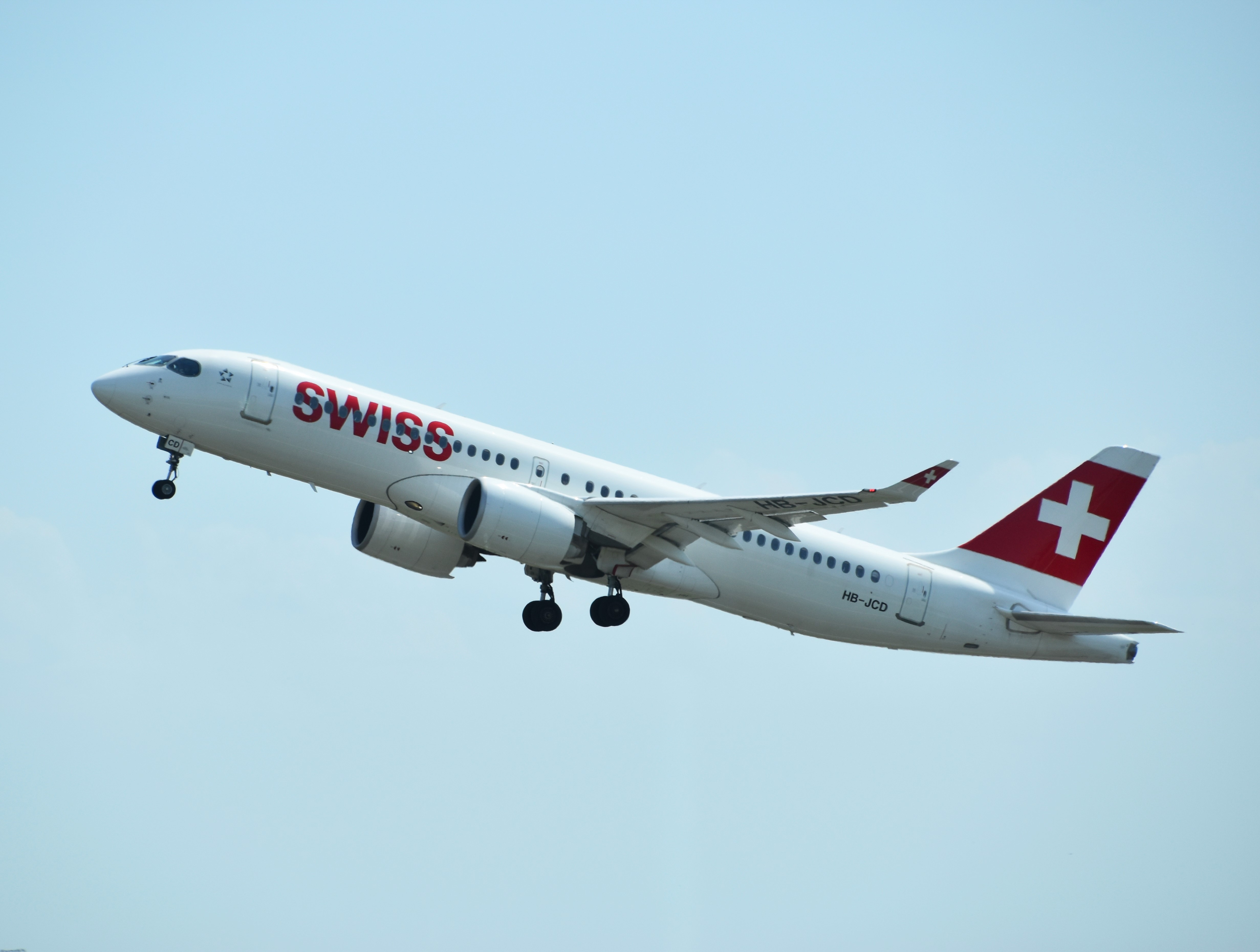
- HB-JCD, the aircraft involved in the accident, seen in 2022

Accident
- Date: 23 December 2024
- Summary: Cabin smoke due to engine failure caused by previously unknown fault pattern
- Site: Styria, Austria; 46°59′35″N 015°26′21″E

Aircraft
- Aircraft type: Airbus A220-300
- Operator: Swiss International Air Lines
- IATA flight No.: LX1885
- ICAO flight No.: SWR2SE
- Call sign: SWISS TWO SIERRA ECHO (Note: The callsign is based on the ICAO designator.)
- Registration: HB-JCD
- Flight origin: Bucharest Henri Coandă International Airport, Bucharest, Romania
- Destination: Zurich Airport, Zurich, Switzerland
- Occupants: 79
- Passengers: 74
- Crew: 5
- Fatalities: 1
- Injuries: 16
- Survivors: 78

Swiss International Air Lines Flight 1885 was a scheduled international passenger flight operated by Swiss International Air Lines from Bucharest Henri Coandă International Airport in Bucharest, Romania, to Zurich Airport in Zurich, Switzerland. On 23 December 2024, the Airbus A220 experienced an engine failure at FL400 (40,000 feet or 12,000 metres), leading to smoke entering the cabin. An emergency landing was performed at Graz Airport, Austria, and all 79 occupants were evacuated via emergency slides. One crew member was airlifted to a hospital in Graz and died on 30 December 2024, a week after the accident. This was the first fatal accident involving the Airbus A220 and Swiss International Air Lines.

== Aircraft ==
The aircraft involved was a 7-year-old Airbus A220-300, manufactured in 2017, and registered as HB-JCD. It was powered by two Pratt & Whitney PW1524G-3 engines.

== Accident ==
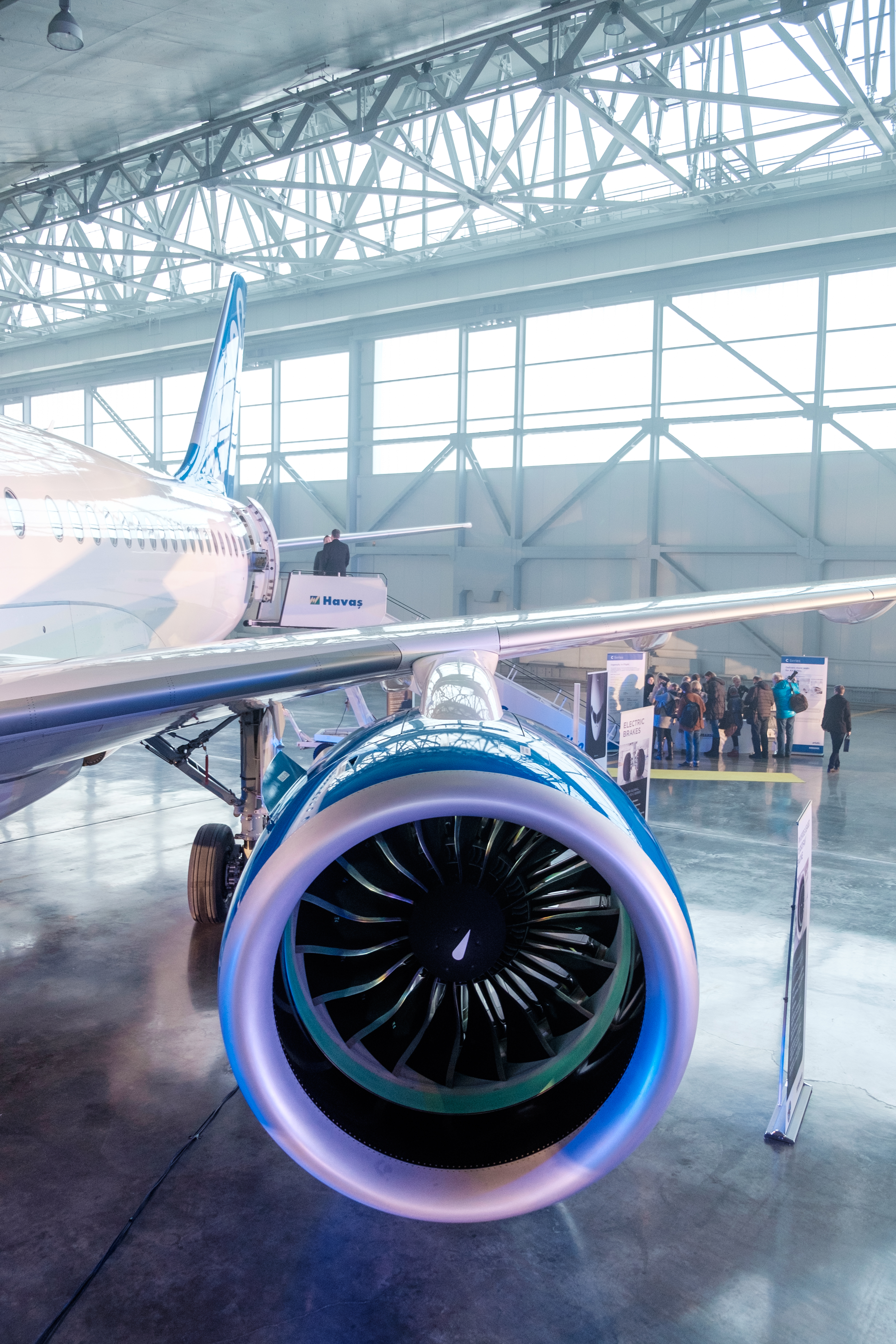
The Airbus A220 is powered by the Pratt & Whitney PW1500G series of high-bypass geared turbofan.

The aircraft had an engine failure at FL400 (40,000 feet or 12,000 metres) en route to Zurich, which led to smoke entering the cabin. The flight was forced to divert to Graz Airport. At 16:33 UTC, the flight emergency landed at Graz, and all 79 passengers and crew members were evacuated using the emergency slides. Twelve passengers and five crew members received medical attention. Two cabin crew members were still in the hospital by 27 December, and on 30 December, a week after the accident, the airline announced that one of the crew members had died.

Flight LX 1885
B Bucharest
G Graz
Z Zurich

== Aftermath ==
The accident marked the first fatal accident in the history of Swiss International Air Lines since its foundation in 2002, and the first fatal accident involving the Airbus A220 family since its introduction in 2016.

== Investigation ==
An engine failure due to a previously unknown fault pattern was flagged during initial investigations. The left engine's Front Drive Gear System as well as two bearings were found damaged. The crew's protective breathing equipment (PBE) was also under investigation. Because of handling and performance issues Swiss had started a replacement programme in October 2023 which was expected to finish in the first quarter of 2025.

The investigation faces scrutiny over the handling of the case by the Austrian Federal Safety Investigation Authority (SUB). Key concerns include a seven-day delay in notifying international bodies of the incident as an "accident," despite the subsequent death of a crew member from oxygen deprivation, potentially linked to faulty breathing equipment (PBE).

A criminal complaint, filed on behalf of ten passengers of a previous, unrelated Austrian Airlines flight that encountered severe hail, alleges a pattern of behavior from the SUB. This filing claimed the SUB initially attempted to classify the Swiss incident as a minor "disturbance". Further allegations claimed improper handling of the potentially faulty PBE masks. The masks were reportedly transported in an "unidentified garbage bag" by airport staff at the SUB investigator's request and left unattended, raising concerns about evidence preservation. The Graz prosecutor's office is investigating potential charges of involuntary manslaughter and bodily harm related to the Swiss incident. The aforementioned complaint also alleged that the SUB had a history of downplaying incidents, citing the Austrian Airlines case where flight recorder data was allegedly not secured following a hailstorm encounter. The SUB denied the claims.

On 17 March 2025, the Written Preliminary Report has been published by the Federal Ministry for Climate Action, Environment, Energy, Mobility, Innovation and Technology.

== See also ==
- 2024 in aviation
