= Marathon Airlines =

Greek airline

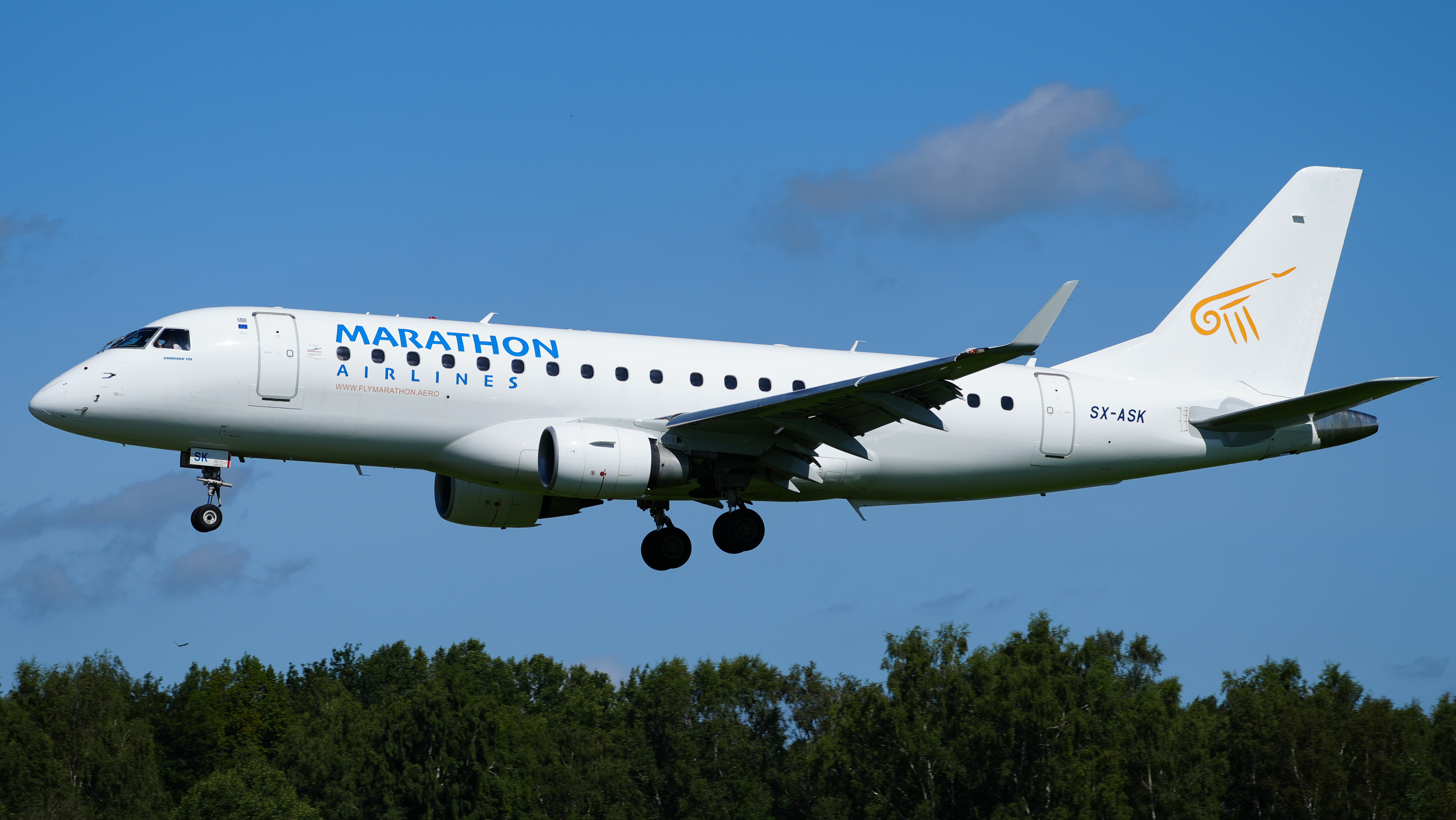
- Marathon Airlines Embraer 175
IATA	ICAO	Call sign
O8	MTO	MARATHON
- Founded: 9 November 2017
- AOC #: GR-062
- Hubs: Athens International Airport
- Fleet size: 5
- Destinations: 8
- Headquarters: Glyfada, Greece
- Key people: Andrew A. Kaiafas (CEO)
- Website: airmarathon.com

Marathon Airlines is a Greek airline headquartered in Glyfada, Greece. Its core activities are executive charter services, wet lease and aircraft management services.

== Operations ==
Marathon Airlines holds a European air operator's certificate (AOC) in Greece and currently operates a fleet of Embraer aircraft, and includes private jet charter, aircraft management and Wet Lease (ACMI). The airline is also a member of Wyvern, the EBAA, and the ERA. As of 2023, the airline planned to expand its activities and commence scheduled international services between Athens and Benghazi.

== Destinations ==
This list of Marathon Airlines destinations includes the city, country, and the airport's name, with the airline's hub marked.

Country	City	Airport	Notes	Notes
Austria	Innsbruck	Innsbruck Airport	Seasonal Charter	
Greece	Athens	Athens International Airport	Base	
Greece	Kalamata	Kalamata International Airport	Seasonal Charter	
Greece	Kavala	Kavala International Airport	Seasonal Charter	
Greece	Kefalonia	Kefalonia International Airport	Seasonal Charter	
Greece	Preveza/Lefkada	Aktion National Airport	Seasonal Charter	
Greece	Thessaloniki	Thessaloniki Airport	Seasonal Charter	
Hungary	Pécs	Pécs-Pogány Airport	Seasonal Charter	
Italy	Cagliari	Cagliari Elmas Airport	Seasonal Charter	
Libya	Benghazi	Benina International Airport		

== Fleet ==
=== Current fleet ===
As of July 2026, Marathon Airlines operates the following aircraft:

Marathon Airlines fleet
Aircraft	In service	Orders	Passengers	Notes
Airbus A320	1	—		
Embraer 175	1	—	88	
Embraer 190	1	—	100	
Embraer 195	2	—	118	
Total	5	—		

=== Former fleet ===
As of December 2023, Marathon Airlines' fleet consists of the following aircraft:

Marathon Airlines former fleet
Aircraft	In service	Orders	Passengers	Notes
Embraer 175	1	—	88	Used for commercial services
Embraer 190	1	—	100	Used for commercial services
Embraer 195	1	—	118	Used for commercial services
Embraer Legacy 600	1	—	13	Used for VIP services
Hawker 800	1	—	8	Used for VIP services
Total	5	—		

== Accidents and incidents ==
- On 18 February 2024, Air Serbia Flight 324, an Embraer 195 wet leased from Marathon Airlines with 106 passengers and crew on board, sustained serious damage to its fuselage and tail after hitting the runway's instrument landing system array during takeoff at Belgrade Nikola Tesla Airport on its way to Düsseldorf. The aircraft turned back after failing to gain altitude and was safely evacuated upon landing. As a result, Air Serbia terminated its wet-lease contract with Marathon Airlines days after the accident.
