= Air Serbia Flight 324 =

2024 aviation accident in Serbia

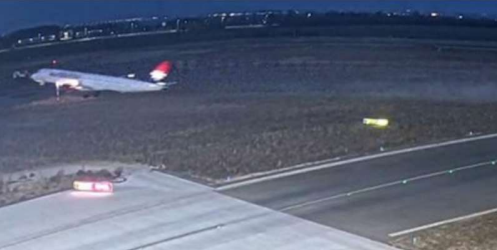
- Surveillance footage showing the aircraft overrunning the runway and hitting the ILS localiser antenna

Accident
- Date: 18 February 2024
- Summary: Runway overrun on takeoff
- Site: Belgrade Nikola Tesla Airport, Belgrade, Serbia; 44°49′39.8″N 20°17′18.5″E

Aircraft
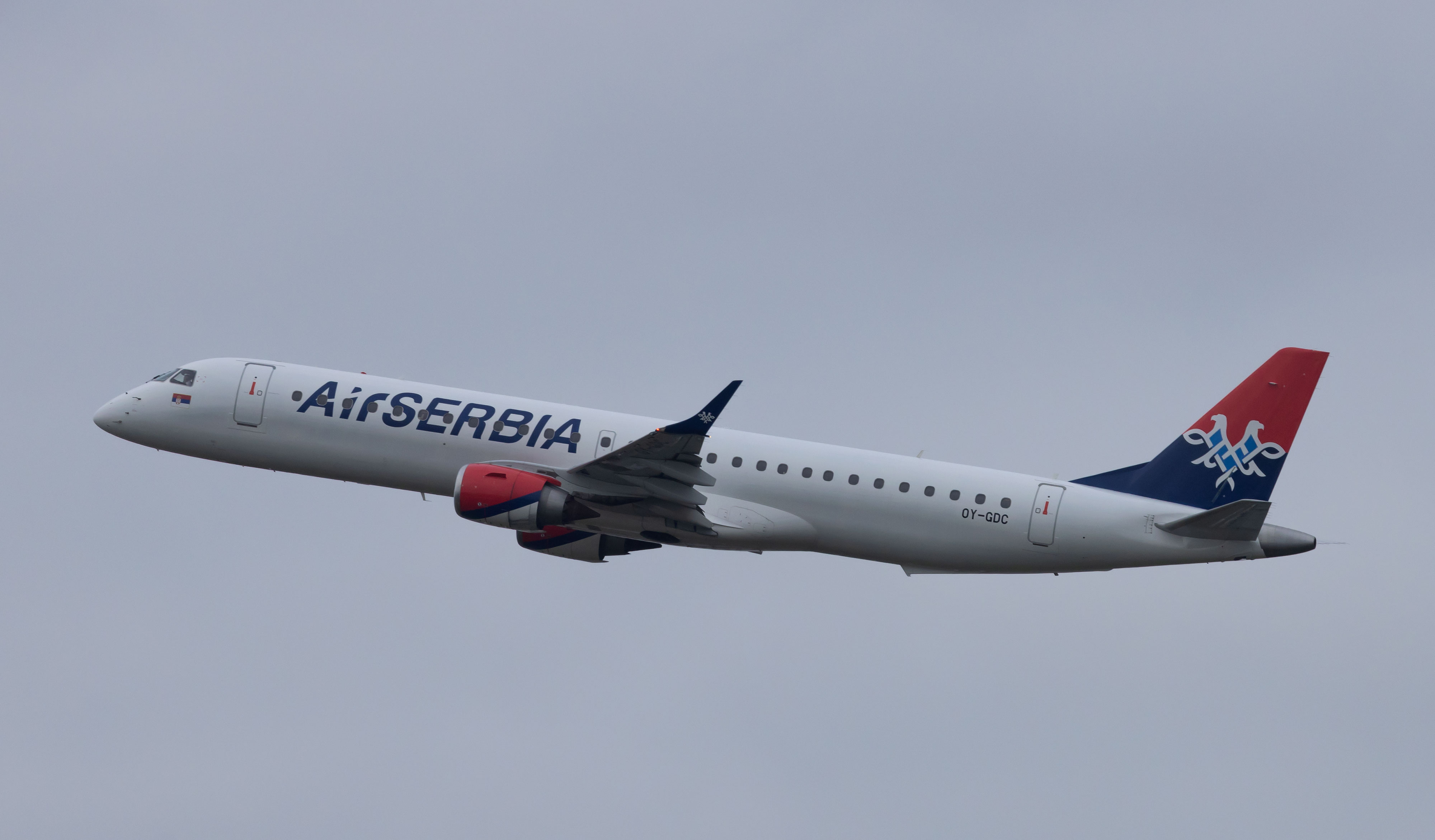
- OY-GDC, the aircraft involved in the accident, seen in 2023
- Aircraft type: Embraer E195
- Operator: Marathon Airlines, on behalf of Air Serbia
- IATA flight No.: JU324
- ICAO flight No.: ASL86C
- Call sign: AIR SERBIA 86 CHARLIE
- Registration: OY-GDC
- Flight origin: Belgrade Nikola Tesla Airport, Belgrade, Serbia
- Destination: Düsseldorf Airport, Düsseldorf, Germany
- Occupants: 111
- Passengers: 105
- Crew: 6
- Fatalities: 0
- Survivors: 111

Air Serbia Flight 324 was a scheduled flight operated by Marathon Airlines on behalf of Air Serbia from Belgrade to Düsseldorf. On 18 February 2024, the Embraer E195 flying the route overran the runway while taking off from Belgrade, striking multiple ground structures before climbing and returning to the airport. None of the 111 people on board the aircraft were injured; however, the aircraft was written off.

The accident led to the termination of the agreement between Air Serbia and Marathon Airlines and the revision of safety procedures at Belgrade Airport. Serbian authorities opened an investigation shortly after the accident which resulted in reports declaring its cause to be primarily pilot error, and Air Serbia reached an out-of-court settlement with a group of passengers who were on board.

== Background ==
In June 2023, Air Serbia signed a wet-lease agreement with Greek carrier Marathon Airlines, whereby it would operate Embraer aircraft on behalf of Air Serbia and provide the necessary crew, maintenance and insurance. Marathon operated aircraft for five other airlines at the time of the accident and had had no serious incidents since their founding in 2017. A total of five of Marathon Airlines' Embraer aircraft were operating on behalf of Air Serbia, and they were scheduled to operate around 19% of all Air Serbia flights in February.

The aircraft involved was a 16-year-old Embraer E195LR, registered in Denmark as OY-GDC. It had returned from maintenance in Athens two days prior. The jet was flown by a 58-year-old Italian pilot with A320 and E170 type-ratings assisted by a Polish copilot with an E170 type-rating. The pair had just flown the return leg of a flight between Vienna and Belgrade.

== Accident ==
Flight 324 was scheduled to depart from Belgrade on the afternoon of 18 February 2024, for a flight to Düsseldorf, Germany. The crew were cleared to take off from the point at intersection D6, which would leave them with a 2,349 metre-long takeoff run. The crew, however, mistakenly taxied onto the runway at intersection D5, leaving them with only 1,273 metres available. Air traffic control notified the pilots of their error, and suggested that they taxi back to D6. Around 30 seconds later, the crew confirmed they would take off from D5 anyway.

During its takeoff run, the aircraft overran the runway and struck multiple airport approach lights and the instrument landing system before eventually becoming airborne. The plane was left with a hole in its fuselage and damage to its wing. It then went on to circle above Belgrade for an hour, after which it landed, and was sprayed with foam by firefighters due to fuel leaking from the aircraft. The passengers were evacuated via jet bridge, and no injuries were reported among the 106 passengers and five crew members.

== Investigation ==
Shortly after the accident, the Belgrade High Prosecutor's Office ordered police to determine the circumstances surrounding the collision. The Serbian Centre for Traffic Accident Investigation (Serbian: Центар за истраживање несрећа у саобраћају — ЦИНС, Centar za istraživanje nesreća u saobraćaju — CINS) also opened an investigation. According to the head of CINS, Nebojša Petrović, the investigation was complicated by the involvement of five other countries (Brazil, where the aircraft was manufactured, Denmark, where it was registered, Greece, where the operating airline was based and Italy and Poland, where the two pilots were from). The black boxes were sent to the US for analysis. The CINS released a preliminary report in the form of an Announcement of Investigation Commencement on 22 February 2024 which contained a timeline of events, classified the event as an accident and concludes that "one of the most probable causes of the accident was the inadequate assessment of the take-off parameters during the preflight preparation of the crew and after the decision to take-off with a shorter runway length compared to the initially planned one".

Despite statements from the head of the CINS from shortly after the accident that the investigation would be completed within three months, and a legal obligation to issue a report within a year, the agency issued an interim report in August 2025. It showed that the crew had not conducted a proper departure briefing and incorrectly calculated the required take off distance, and noted that the captain exerted pressure on the first officer to depart from the incorrect intersection. The investigation concluded that the cause of the accident was pilot error, the report, however, also criticised the airport procedures enacted after the aircraft landed, noting that the jet was initially parked at the terminal despite the major fuel leak, and only later towed to a remote stand.

In December 2025 CINS issued its final report, which reiterated that the accident was the result of a sequence of human error, issues with crew resource management and a systematical non-adherence to procedure. It noted issues with the operations manual of Marathon Airlines and made safety recommendations to the countries that issued the crews' pilot licenses, and remarked that the safety recommendation issued to Belgrade Airport pertaining to its emergency response plans was fulfilled.

According to aviation analyst Isa Alkalay, the air traffic controller on duty performed their job "by the book", as according to ICAO Annex 2 ("Rules of the Air") to the Chicago Convention, "The pilot-in-command of an aircraft shall have final authority as to the disposition of the aircraft while in command." Alkalay instead criticises the pilots' "incompetent" reaction and "the system" which allowed them to be certified, as well as the decision to park the aircraft leaking fuel by the terminal. The accident has been called the national airline's "most serious safety incident since the 90s".

== Aftermath ==
Flights were temporarily diverted from Belgrade Airport, and the airport's instrument landing system was downgraded from CAT III to CAT I. As a result of the accident, Air Serbia announced the termination of its wet-lease agreement with Marathon Airlines on February 20, and announced that flights scheduled to be operated by Marathon would be instead operated by other aircraft in the Air Serbia fleet to minimise disruption. Additionally, the aircraft suffered significant damage and was eventually written off. The emergency response plans at Belgrade airport were also revised to require aircraft leaking fuel to be directed away from terminal operations.

Near the end of 2024, Air Serbia reached an out-of-court settlement with a group of around 50 passengers who were on the flight reportedly for a sum of around 1,000,000 Serbian dinars per person (around €8,500 at the time). The group received their money in June 2025, however Air Serbia was criticised for the response, and one passenger was quoted as saying that they were "not really satisfied", with some saying they were traumatised by the incident and left with a fear of flying. Air Serbia was allegedly dismissive during the negotiations, saying that when the passengers were flown to Düsseldorf on a replacement flight, "nobody had a fear of flying then". The passengers that were not part of this group of 50 received only the standard compensation amounting to around €200.

== See also ==
- Croatia Airlines Flight 412
