= Canada Jetlines =

Low-cost airline of Canada (2013–2024)

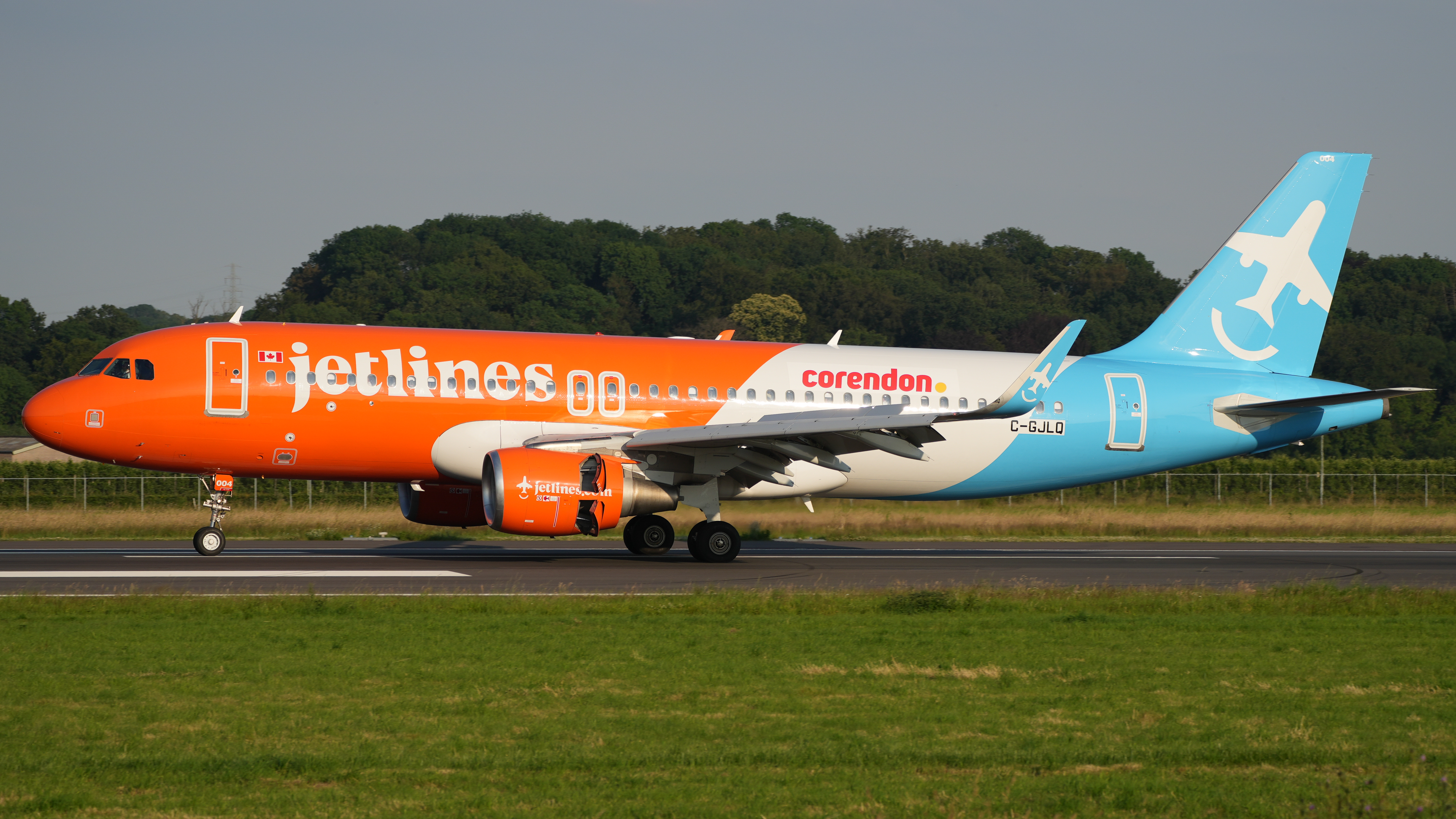
IATA	ICAO	Call sign
AU	CJL	JETBUS
- Founded: 2013
- Commenced operations: September 22, 2022
- Ceased operations: August 15, 2024
- Operating bases: Toronto Pearson International Airport
- Fleet size: 4
- Destinations: 5
- Headquarters: Mississauga, Ontario, Canada
- Key people: Brigitte Goersch (Chairperson); Eddy Doyle (CEO); Percy Gyara (CFO); Brad Warren (COO); Reg Christian (VP)
- Employees: 200
- Website: www.jetlines.com

Canada Jetlines, Ltd., operating and branded as jetlines, was a Canadian airline headquartered in Mississauga, Ontario. It operated scheduled and charter flights in the Americas and the Caribbean. The airline launched its inaugural flight on September 22, 2022, from Toronto Pearson to Calgary.

In August 2024, it ceased operations and said that it would seek creditor protection. It was declared bankrupt on September 11, 2024.

== History ==
In June 2016, the airline announced that it had asked the Canadian government to relax its legal requirement for Canadian airlines to have no more than 25% foreign ownership, allowing Canada Jetlines to seek foreign investment up to the level of 49% ownership. On November 3, 2016, Transport Minister Marc Garneau approved Jetlines' request for exemption from the current foreign ownership rules, which allowed the airline to access necessary capital in order to begin operations. The airline has one minority owner from Europe and a board made up of aviation industry members from Europe and the United States.

On November 4, 2016, Canada Jetlines announced that it was planning to launch operations on strong primary and secondary routes by operating scheduled point-to-point jet air service. Jetlines planned to operate flights throughout Canada, the United States, Mexico, and the Caribbean. On September 11, 2017, Canada Jetlines released a map of cities to which it intended to fly by April 2019. On May 8, 2018, Canada Jetlines announced that it would not be leasing two Boeing 737-800 aircraft as initially planned due to the lessor being unable to confirm a delivery date. Jetlines concluded a term sheet on April 23, 2018, to lease two Airbus A320 aircraft instead, and made a deposit payment of US$876,000. On June 13, 2018, Jetlines announced that it had partnered with AerCap, an aircraft leasing and aviation finance company, to sign a Definitive Lease Agreement for two Airbus A320 aircraft. Delivery of the two aircraft was expected by the first half of 2019. On April 4, 2019, Jetlines announced that it intended to launch operations in December 2019 and had subsequently withdrawn from its leasing agreement with AerCap dated April 23, 2018. Jetlines intended to lease its initial aircraft with its partner, SmartLynx Airlines, with delivery of the aircraft occurring in Q4 2019.

On February 28, 2017, Canada Jetlines completed a merger with Jet Metal Corp. Until then, Canada Jetlines was a private company that had raised money over three years with the goal of becoming an ultra low-cost carrier (ULCC). Jet Metal Corp. was a publicly listed company that was previously involved in mineral exploration, but had ceased active operations in 2017. Jet Metal Corp became publicly listed in 2014 as a special-purpose acquisition company (SPAC). As an initial public offering (IPO) process is quite lengthy and expensive, it is easier for private corporations to obtain a public listing through a corporate transaction with an inactive listed company or SPAC. A public listing was sought as it provided greater access to capital given the increased liquidity compared to a private corporation. The common shares of Canada Jetlines trades on the NEO Stock Exchange – with the ticker symbol "CJET".

On April 3, 2019, Jetlines announced its anticipated launch of commercial service to be December 17, 2019 with Toronto Pearson International Airport acting as Jetlines' home base. Because of the company's progress, Jetlines and AerCap mutually agreed to cancel their agreement for two A320 leases. In place of that agreement, Jetlines signed a letter of intent with SmartLynx Airlines for two alternate Airbus A320s available for delivery in Q4 2019, which was in line with the planned commencement of the company's operations.

On February 28, 2022, Jetlines' first Airbus A320, C-GCJL, which formerly flew for Avianca and Pegasus Airlines, touched down at Region of Waterloo International Airport. The aircraft was flown from Shannon Airport in Ireland after completing interior refurbishment and repainting. In April 2022, the company announced plans to begin operations in the summer of 2022 with no firm announcement of which destinations would be served first. Toronto Pearson International Airport was later announced as the primary travel hub for the airline. Additional airport confirmations include Montréal's Saint-Hubert Airport, Puerto Vallarta, Los Cabos, Cancun, Dominican Republic, Winnipeg, Kelowna, and Québec City. On July 19, 2022, the airline announced that it would begin service from Toronto's Pearson Airport to both Moncton and Winnipeg starting on August 15, 2022, however on August 4, 2022, the airline announced that the launch would be postponed by two weeks to August 29, 2022. The airline postponed its launch again to September 22, 2022, by then adjusting its network to instead launch services to Calgary International Airport from Toronto Pearson instead of Moncton and Winnipeg.

In October 2022, Canada Jetlines negotiated the acquisition of its second aircraft for delivery on November 30, 2022, expecting to expand to a fleet of 15 aircraft by the end of 2025. In November 2022, the airline announced its first destinations in the United States, consisting of Las Vegas and Melbourne, which were planned to launch in February 2023, but had later been postponed. On December 19, 2022, the airline announced that it had received approval from the U.S. Federal Aviation Administration (FAA) to begin operations to the country.

In January 2023, Canada Jetlines halted domestic flights to focus on its foreign travel routes and plane leasing. In June 2024, Eddy Doyle stepped down as CEO. On August 12, 2024, four directors on the board, including chair and CEO Brigitte Goersch, resigned. On August 15, the company paused all operations and said it would seek creditor protection.

== Destinations ==
Canada Jetlines operated scheduled flights to the following destinations at the time operations ceased in August 2024. Destinations operated to solely with charter flights are not listed.

Country	City	Airport	Start date	End date	Notes	Refs
Canada	Calgary	Calgary International Airport	September 22, 2022	January 19, 2023	Terminated	
Canada	Halifax	Halifax Stanfield International Airport	June 2, 2024	August 15th 2024	Seasonal	
Canada	Toronto	Toronto Pearson International Airport	September 22, 2022	August 15th 2024	Base	
Canada	Vancouver	Vancouver International Airport	December 9, 2022	January 9, 2023	Terminated	
Guyana	Georgetown	Cheddi Jagan International Airport	October 8, 2023	August 15th 2024		
Jamaica	Montego Bay	Sangster International Airport	December 9, 2023	August 15th 2024		
Mexico	Cancún	Cancún International Airport	March 3, 2023	August 15th 2024		
United States	Las Vegas	Harry Reid International Airport	February 16, 2023	August 15th 2024		
United States	Miami	Miami International Airport	June 29, 2024	August 15th 2024		
United States	Orlando	Orlando International Airport	October 30, 2023	August 15th 2024		

== Fleet ==
As of March 2024, the Canada Jetlines fleet consisted of the following aircraft:

Canada Jetlines fleet
Aircraft	In service	Orders	Passengers	Notes
Airbus A320-200	4	—	174	
Total	4	—		
