= Emtrasur Cargo =

Venezuelan cargo airline

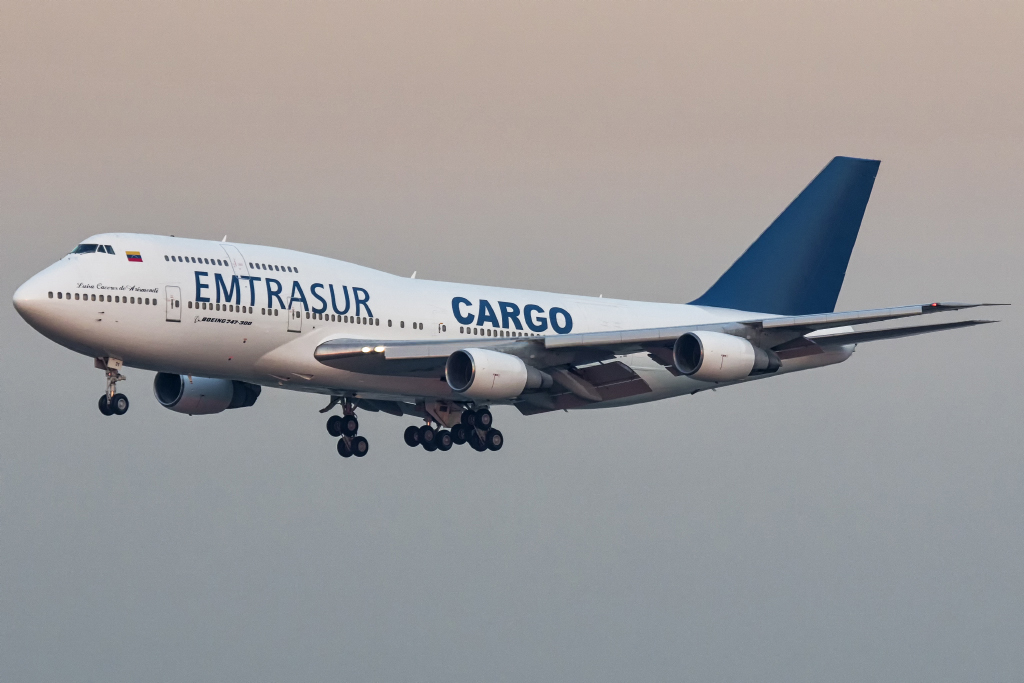
- Emtrasur Cargo Boeing 747, 2022
| IATA | ICAO | Call sign |
|---|---|---|
| - | ESU | EMTRASUR |
- Founded: November 19, 2020
- Commenced operations: February 2022
- Hubs: El Libertador Air Base
- Fleet size: 1
- Parent company: Conviasa
- Headquarters: Maracay, Venezuela

Emtrasur Cargo (legally Empresa de Transporte Aéreocargo del Sur S.A.) is a cargo subsidiary of the Venezuelan flag carrier Conviasa.

== Controversies ==
Emtrasur owned a Boeing 747-300M (YV3531, msn 23413) that previously belonged to Iranian airline Mahan Air, a company that American assistant secretary of export enforcement at the Department of Commerce, Matthew S. Axelrod, alleges has connections to Hezbollah.

On June 8, 2022, the Boeing 747 arrived in Argentina, after a flight originating in Mexico with a stop-over in Venezuela. Two days later, it took off for Uruguay but was denied entry into Uruguayan airspace and returned to Argentina, landing back at Ezeiza International Airport in Buenos Aires. The 747 was subsequently detained there for two years.

On February 11, 2024 the plane was transferred to the United States Department of Justice. The next day, the Argentine government allowed it to be flown to the United States where it landed at Dade-Collier Training and Transition Airport as TYSON23.

In response to the seizure of the aircraft, Venezuela closed its airspace to all Argentine-registered, Argentina-bound and outbound aircraft. Venezuelan Minister of Foreign Affairs Yván Gil described the seizure as a 'criminal act' of 'piracy and theft', calling the Argentine Government 'neo-Nazi'.

The United States Department of Justice declared that the airplane would be "prepared for disposition" without elaborating on plans for the jet. The 747 was scrapped on February 28, 2024.

== Fleet ==
=== Current ===
As of February 2025, Emtrasur Cargo operates the following aircraft:

| Aircraft | In service | Orders | Notes |
|---|---|---|---|
| Let L-410 Turbolet | 1 | — | |
| Total | 1 | | |

=== Former ===
Emtrasur Cargo formerly operated the following aircraft:

| Aircraft | Total | Introduced | Retired | Notes |
|---|---|---|---|---|
| Boeing 747-300M | 1 | 2022 | 2022 | Leased from Mahan Air. Scrapped in 2024. |

== See also ==
- List of airlines of Venezuela
