= Boom Overture =

Under-development supersonic airliner

- Concept art of Boom Overture in flight

General information
- Type: Supersonic airliner
- National origin: United States
- Manufacturer: Boom Technology
- Status: Under development

History
- Introduction date: 2028 (planned)
- First flight: 2027 (planned)
- Expected: 2029/2030 (planned)
- Developed from: Boom XB-1

Boom Overture is a supersonic airliner under development by Boom Technology. The aircraft is designed to cruise at a maximum speed of Mach 1.7 or 975 knots (1,806 km/h; 1,122 mph), and is expected to reach supersonic speeds without causing a sonic boom at ground level by taking advantage of a physics phenomenon known as mach cutoff. It is expected to carry 60 to 80 passengers, depending on configuration, with a range of 4,250 nautical miles [nmi] (7,870 km; 4,890 mi). Boom aims to introduce the Overture in 2029. The company projects a market for over 1,000 supersonic aircraft serving more than 600 viable routes, with fares comparable to business class. Featuring a delta wing design similar to that of the Concorde, the Overture is expected to use composite materials in its construction. A 2022 redesign specified four medium bypass (non-afterburning) turbofan engines, each reportedly producing 180 kilonewtons (40,000 pounds-force) of thrust.

== Development ==
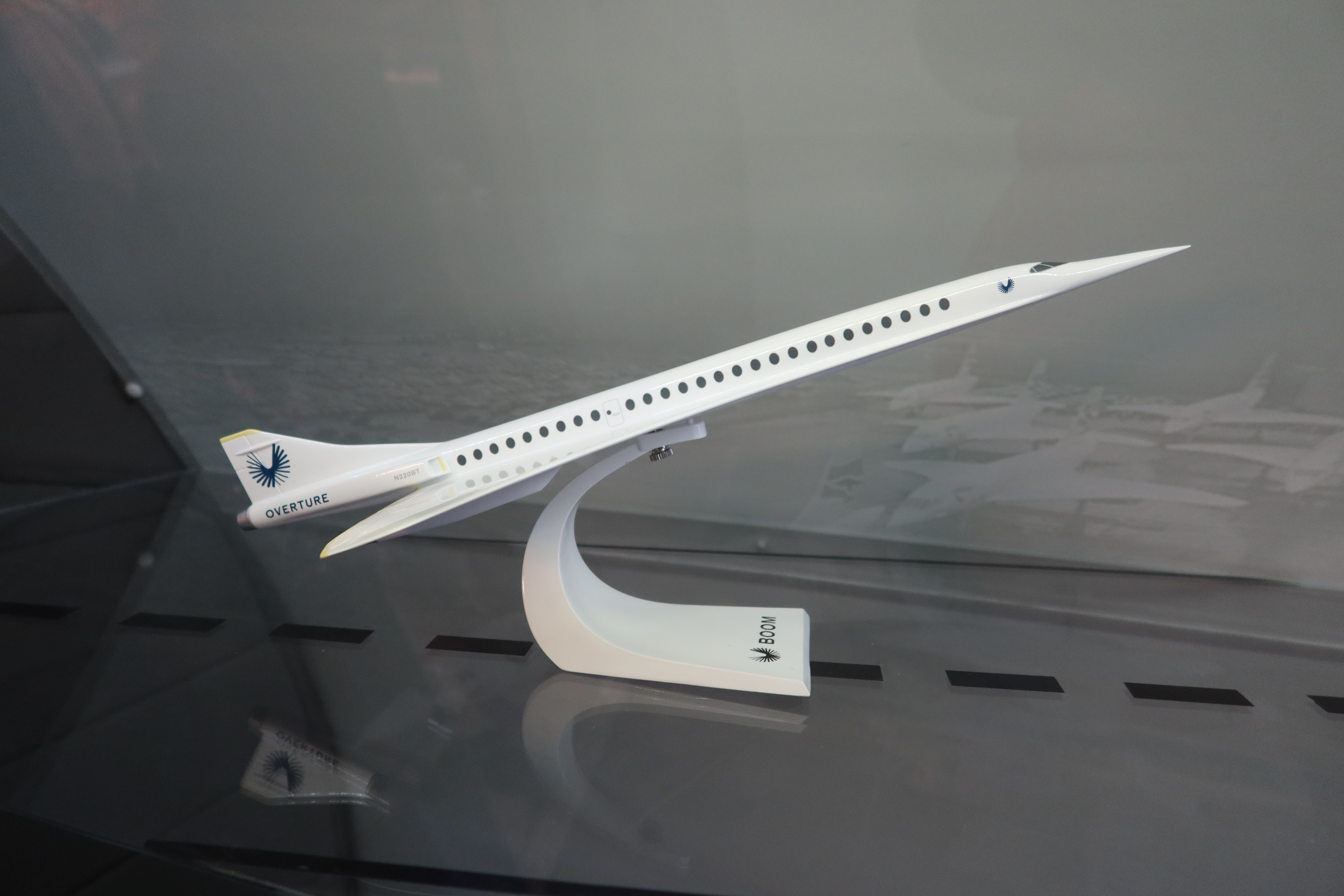
Boom Overture pedestal model at Brooklands Museum

By March 2016, the company had created concept drawings and wooden mockups of parts of the aircraft. In October 2016, the design was stretched to 155 ft (47 m) to seat up to 50 passengers with ten extra seats, its wingspan marginally increased, and a third engine was added to enable ETOPS with up to a 180 minutes diversion time. The plane could seat 55 passengers in a higher-density configuration. In June 2017, its introduction was scheduled for 2023. By July 2018, it was delayed to 2025. At the time, it had undergone over 1,000 simulated wind tunnel tests.

Boom initially targeted a Mach 2.2 cruise speed to fit with transoceanic airline timetables and allow higher utilization, while keeping airport noise to Stage 4, similar to subsonic long-range aircraft. The plane configuration was intended to be locked in late 2019 to early 2020 for a launch with engine selection, supply chain, production site. Development and certification of the airliner and its engine were estimated at $6 billion, requiring Series C investors. Enough money was raised in the B round of fundraising to be able to hit key milestones, including flying the XB-1 demonstrator to prove the technology, building up an order book, finding key suppliers for engines, aerostructures, and avionics, and lay out the certification process, with many special conditions but with precedents.

At the June 2019 Paris Air Show, Boom CEO Blake Scholl announced the introduction of the Overture was delayed from 2023 to the 2025–2027 timeframe, following a two-year test campaign with six aircraft. In September 2020, the company announced it has been contracted by the United States Air Force to develop the Overture for possible use as Air Force One.

On October 7, 2020, Boom publicly unveiled its XB-1 demonstrator, which it planned to fly for the first time in 2021 from Mojave Air and Space Port, California. It expected to begin wind tunnel tests for the Overture in 2021, and start construction of a manufacturing facility in 2022, with the capacity to produce 5 to 10 aircraft monthly. The first Overture would be unveiled in 2025, with the aim of achieving type certification by 2029. Flights should be available in 2030, as estimated by Blake Scholl.

Boom targets a slower Mach 1.7 cruise speed. In January 2022, Boom announced a grant of US$60 million from the US Air Force’s AFWERX program to further develop the Boom Overture supersonic airliner. In July 2022, Boom announced a partnership with Northrop Grumman to develop a 'special mission' variant for the U.S. Government and its allies. Overture's introduction is now planned for 2027, while its first flight is now planned for 2028 with type certification expected in 2029.

On July 19, 2022, Boom unveiled a significantly revised proposal for the production version of the Overture at the Farnborough Airshow. This version has four engines and a tailed delta wing.

On December 13, 2022, Boom announced that it would develop its own turbofan engine after "Big Three" engine manufacturers Rolls-Royce, Pratt & Whitney and General Electric, as well as CFM and Safran previously declined to develop a new engine due to high capital costs. Named Symphony, the engine will be developed under partnership with three entities: Kratos subsidiary Florida Turbine Technologies for engine design; StandardAero for maintenance; and General Electric subsidiary Colibrium Additive for consulting on printing components.

== Design ==
Boom's original design for Overture was a trijet, and the XB-1 test vehicle was designed and built on this basis. XB-1 took its first flight in March 2024, and broke the sound barrier for the first time in January 2025. In July 2022, the company announced a redesign of Overture into a quadjet. The new design features four large external engine pods rather than the two more compact engine 'box' nacelles, used on Concorde. This design has not been seen in high speed aircraft since the Convair B-58 Hustler bomber of the 1960s, due to high supersonic wave drag implications. It also now features a small horizontal stabilizer. Increasing the number of engines to four allows for ease of maintenance, smaller less technically challenging engines and takeoff at derated levels to lower noise. The gull form wing and fuselage were also modified to reduce drag. Airframe maintenance costs are expected to be similar to those of other carbon fiber airliners. The Overture should have lower fuel burn than Concorde by relying on non-afterburning engines, composite structures, and improved technology.

In 2017 the FAA and International Civil Aviation Organization (ICAO) were working on a sonic boom standard to allow supersonic flights overland. NASA planned to fly its Low Boom Flight Demonstrator for the first time in 2022 to assess public acceptability of a 75 PNLdB boom, lower than Concorde's 105 PNLdB. The Overture is expected to not be louder at take-off than current airliners like the Boeing 777-300ER. Supersonic jets could be exempted from the FAA takeoff noise regulations, reducing their fuel consumption by 20–30% by using narrower engines optimized for acceleration over limiting noise. In 2017, Honeywell and NASA tested predictive software and cockpit displays showing the sonic booms en route, to minimize its disruption overland.

In 2025, following test flights of the XB-1 demonstrator, Boom announced Boomless Cruise for Overture, which enables supersonic speed without generating a sonic boom audible at ground level. This is due to a phenomenon known as "Mach cutoff". On Overture, Boomless Cruise is enabled by an advanced autopilot using weather conditions and software algorithms to automatically select the optimal speed for Mach cutoff conditions.

=== Engines ===
The Boom Symphony engine is planned as a two-spool medium-bypass turbofan for use on Overture. The engine is intended to produce 40,000 pounds (160 kN) of thrust at takeoff, sustain Overture supercruise at Mach 1.7, and burn up to 100% sustainable aviation fuel as an option.

Boom announced in December 2022 that development of the engine will be conducted in partnership with Kratos subsidiary Florida Turbine Technologies for engine design, GE Aerospace subsidiary Colibrium Additive for additive manufacturing consulting, and StandardAero for maintenance and assembly. FTT/KTT is currently a maker of microturbines for drones and cruise missiles.

In 2025, Boom announced that it is building out a facility for testing its Symphony engine at the Colorado Air & Space Port. Boom is producing parts for an engine core prototype at its research and development facility in Colorado, and expects to conduct tests in 2026.

=== Environment ===
Drag increases (and therefore fuel efficiency decreases) with cruising speed, and there is a particularly severe increase in drag around the sound barrier. Boom agrees that the fuel burn of the aircraft will be higher than subsonic competition, but states that operators of the aircraft "must use sustainable aviation fuel (SAF) and/or purchase high-quality carbon removal credits" to reduce the environmental impact. However, sustainable aviation fuel is not yet widely available, with large-scale production relying on technology that does not yet exist, and carbon-offsetting schemes have been widely criticized as being unable to deliver net zero.

== Market ==
According to the company, over 600 daily routes could be viable. At Mach 1.7 over water, transatlantic flight times would be reduced significantly: Newark to London in 3 hours 40 minutes, and Newark to Frankfurt in 4 hours 15 minutes. Boom estimates a potential market for 1,000 supersonic airliners by 2035. The Overture Superfactory has the capacity to assemble 33 aircraft per year on the first assembly line, and up to 66 per year with the addition of a second assembly line, supporting a market of 1,000 to 2,000 aircraft over a 10-year period.

Boom expects that Overture's fuel efficiency and other operational factors will enable round-trip fares of approximately US$5,000 for a recliner-style business-class seat on the New York–London route, comparable to the cost of a lie-flat business class seat on a subsonic aircraft. By comparison, a round-trip ticket on the Concorde for the same route in 2003, its final year of service, cost US$12,000 (equivalent to $21,000 in 2025).

In March 2016, Richard Branson confirmed that the Virgin Group held purchase options for 10 Overture aircraft, and that Virgin Galactic's subsidiary The Spaceship Company, would assist with manufacturing and testing the jet. However, in 2023, Virgin Group announced that its purchase options had expired. In December 2017, Japan Airlines was confirmed to have pre-ordered up to 20 aircraft. On June 3, 2021, United Airlines announced an agreement to purchase 15 Overture aircraft, with options for an additional 35, and expects to begin passenger service by 2029. On August 16, 2022, American Airlines announced a similar agreement to purchase 20 aircraft, with options for an additional 40.

=== Order summary ===
Date	Customer	Orders	Options	Notes
March 23, 2016	Virgin Group	–	~~10~~	Options expired on July 10, 2023
December 5, 2017	Japan Airlines	–	20	
June 3, 2021	United Airlines	15	35	
August 16, 2022	American Airlines	20	40	
Totals		35	95	130 total

== Specifications ==
Data from Boom, Aviation International News, and FlightGlobal

General characteristics

- Capacity: 60 to 80 passengers
- Length: 201 ft (61 m)
- Wingspan: 106 ft (32 m)
- Max takeoff weight: 415,000 lb (188,241 kg)
- Powerplant: 4 × Boom Symphony medium-bypass turbofans, 40,000 lbf (180 kN) thrust each

Performance

- Maximum speed: 975 kn (1,122 mph, 1,805 km/h) at 60,000 ft
- Range: 4,250 nmi (4,890 mi, 7,870 km)

== See also ==
- Supersonic business jet
- Comac C949

Related lists

- List of airliners
