= Boom Symphony =

Supersonic turbofan engine design

Symphony
- Promotional artwork of the Symphony engine
- Type: Medium-bypass turbofan
- National origin: United States
- Manufacturer: Boom Technology
- Major applications: Boom Overture

The Boom Symphony is a medium-bypass turbofan engine under development by Boom Technology for use on its Overture supersonic airliner. The engine is designed to produce 40,000 pounds (178 kN) of thrust at takeoff, sustain Overture supercruise at Mach 1.7, and burn up to 100% sustainable aviation fuel.

Boom is vertically integrating the engine, and partnering with Kratos subsidiary Florida Turbine Technologies for engine design, GE Aerospace subsidiary Colibrium Additive (formerly GE Additive) for additive manufacturing consulting, and StandardAero for maintenance and assembly. The Colorado Air and Space Port just outside of Aurora, Colorado is slated as the engine's test site. Boom is investing $3-5 million into the former Reaction Engines site to prepare it for Symphony engine testing.

== Design and development ==
=== Technical Specifications ===
Engine design features include:

- Two-spool, medium-bypass turbofan engine, no afterburner
- 40,000 lb (178 kN) thrust
- Optimized for up to 100% Sustainable Aviation Fuel (SAF)
- Single-stage 72" (1.8 m) fan
- Air-cooled, multi-stage turbine
- Compliant with global noise standards

=== Background ===
Boom intends to use a twin-spool, medium-bypass turbofan that can achieve supercruise (supersonic flight without afterburners). Concorde's Rolls-Royce/Snecma Olympus 593 could sustain supercruise, but required afterburners for takeoff and transonic acceleration, producing excessive noise on takeoff. Although improved over afterburning, supercruise generates more noise and offers worse fuel consumption than modern subsonic engines. A supersonic aircraft is estimated to burn at least three times as much fuel per passenger per nm as a subsonic aircraft, increasing greenhouse gas pollution unless sustainable fuel is used. This is due to higher optimal cruise altitude requiring a longer climb time, higher parasitic drag at supersonic speed, lower bypass ratio of engines, and necessarily higher exhaust velocity. In addition, engines designed for supersonic flight usually assume some ram compression by the intake structure at cruise. In order to avoid problems associated with excessive compressor outlet temperature, a lower compressor pressure ratio is required to bring the overall PR down when the aircraft is near top speed and altitude. However this reduces thrust and increases fuel consumption at subsonic speed and low altitude, during initial climb-out.

Boom's design adds a proprietary axisymmetric supersonic intake, matched with a variable-geometry low-noise exhaust nozzle and a passively cooled high-pressure turbine to a conventional engine design. In supersonic turbofans, it's desirable to mix the relatively hot (compared to subsonic engines) core exhaust with the bypass air thereby increasing its volume and slowing the mixed gases to subsonic speed. A variable nozzle is a practical necessity to control the backpressure and accelerate the mixed exhaust back up to supersonic speed at cruise.

Existing supersonic engines are jet fighter engines, which have neither the fuel economy nor the reliability required for commercial aviation.

== See also ==
Comparable engines

- Rolls-Royce Olympus
- General Electric Affinity
- Pratt & Whitney JT8D

Related lists

- List of aircraft engines
