= Hermeus =

American startup airliner company

- Type: Private
- Industry: Aerospace
- Founded: 2018
- Founder: AJ Piplica; Skyler Shuford (COO); Glenn Case (CTO); Mike Smayda (CPO)
- Headquarters: Atlanta, Georgia
- Number of locations: 4
- Website: hermeus.com

Hermeus Corporation is an American startup company designing a hypersonic airliner.

== History ==
The company was founded in 2018 with initial funding led by Khosla Ventures.

In 2021, Hermeus secured $60 million in funding from the U.S. Air Force and venture capital to support the Quarterhorse flight test program.

In March 2022, the company raised a $100 million series B investment round led by Sam Altman. Other investors included Founders Fund, In-Q-Tel, and existing investors Khosla Ventures, Canaan Partners, and Bling Capital.

== Products ==
The Quarterhorse aircraft under development is planned to reach Mach 5 with a range of 4,600 miles (7,400 km). The company claims to have designed, built, and successfully tested a Mach 5 engine prototype. In August 2020, Hermeus received a $1.5 million contract from the United States Air Force to develop their proposed aircraft and function as a possible Air Force One.

They are building the supersonic Quarterhorse Mk 2 with an advanced engine based on the Pratt & Whitney F100. Quarterhorse Mk 2 is expected to hit speeds greater than Mach 2.5.

In September 2026, Hermeus announced a production license agreement with Pratt & Whitney to manufacture the F-100-PW-229 engine.

== Design ==
The engine adds a precooler to a standard Pratt & Whitney F100. The precooler lowers the temperature of incoming air, preventing the melting of engine parts and allowing the engine to be more efficient.

The Chimera engine is a turbine-based combined cycle machine that combines a pre-cooled turbine with a ramjet. It was successfully tested in November 2022. It is planned to power the Quarterhorse Mk 3, which will reach speeds close to Mach 1. Upon reaching sufficient speed, Chimera routes incoming air around the turbojet and the ramjet takes over at around Mach 3.

== Development ==
=== Quarterhorse ===
The Quarterhorse development program has four stages:

- MK 0: A non-flying prototype to validate all major aircraft subsystems.
- Mk 1: The first flyable version.
- Mk 2: Supersonic speeds in 2025.
- Mk 3: Incorporates Chimera II propulsion system, targeting faster than Mach 3.3.

=== Darkhorse ===
Darkhorse is an uncrewed hypersonic military jet intended for mass production.

=== Ramjet-X ===
Expendable ramjet-powered unmanned aircraft that is carried by the Quarterhorse and launched at a velocity of Mach 3.

== Testing ==
In August 2024, Hermeus completed low-speed taxi tests, and in May 2025 the Quarterhorse Mk 1 flew a successful flight test at Edwards AFB. At the same time it was reported that the Mk2 was already well into its manufacturing process. On March 2, 2026, the Quarterhorse Mk 2.1 made its first flight, and it went supersonic on its third flight in May.

== See also ==
- Aerion
- Boom Supersonic
- Exosonic
- Spike Aerospace
