= Boom XB-1 =

Trijet supersonic demonstrator aircraft

Boom Technology XB-1
- Rendering of an early design of the XB-1 demonstrator

General information
- Other name: "Baby Boom"
- Type: Supersonic technology demonstrator aircraft
- Role: Experimental
- National origin: United States
- Manufacturer: Boom Technology
- Status: Retired
- Number built: 1

History
- First flight: March 22, 2024
- Retired: February 15, 2025
- Developed into: Boom Overture

The Boom XB-1 "Baby Boom" is a retired trijet supersonic demonstrator designed by Boom Technology as part of the development of the Boom Overture supersonic transport airliner. Powered by three General Electric J85 engines, it was initially designed to maintain a speed of Mach 2.2, with over 1,000 nautical miles (1,900 km; 1,200 mi) of range; but the demonstrator was tested to only Mach 1.1 and no long–range flights were made.

The XB-1 began taxi tests in December 2022, and conducted its maiden flight on March 22, 2024. The aircraft performed its first supersonic flight test on January 28, 2025, being the first privately developed jet aircraft to do so. It made a second supersonic flight on February 10, 2025, after which the XB-1 was retired.

== Development ==
The original design was unveiled at Centennial Airport in Dove Valley, near Denver, Colorado, on November 15, 2016, and it was initially intended to make its first subsonic flight in late 2017, powered by General Electric CJ610 turbojet engines, with subsequent supersonic flight tests planned elsewhere.

By April 2017, sufficient financing had been secured to build and fly it. Its preliminary design review was completed by June 2017, with a switch of engine to the GE J85 to take advantage of its extra thrust. The company then stated that flight tests would start in late 2018. In 2017, the composite wing spar was load tested while being heated in a hydraulic testbed at 300 °F (150 °C), above the heat soak operational temperature. First expected supersonic flight slipped to 2019.

By July 2018, the aerodynamic design was completed, the horizontal tail was assembled, and the engines were received. The Spaceship Co., manufacturer of Virgin Galactic's vehicles, was announced as a partner for flight tests in Mojave, California. Flight tests were delayed again to 2019 due to challenging aerodynamics and further engine change, from the 3,500 lbf (16 kN) J85-21 to the 4,300 lbf (19 kN) J85-15.

The XB-1 design went through three sets of wind-tunnel tests. The first indicated that the predicted calibration was off by 30%. The second set of tests confirmed accurate calibration, and a third set of tests confirmed design safety. The tunnel testing finished in November 2018, including takeoff and landing with gear doors' impact on stability, as well as supersonic inlet testing. These tests had taken a decade on the Concorde. The carbon-fiber layup of the fuselage halves was to begin in early 2019 for final assembly of the forward fuselage at the beginning of spring. With total investment rising to $200 million, Boom was funded for XB-1 flight-testing to the end of 2020. At the June 2019 Paris Air Show, Blake Scholl announced the date for first flight was pushed out to 2020, which would have been three years later than previously planned, after including a stability augmentation system for better safety at high speed and at take-off and landing.

In February 2020, with the completion of Boom's second simulator, tests began on XB-1 flight controls and system integration. Static wing-loading tests were carried out in March 2020, and the wings were mated to the fuselage in April with the aft fuselage nearing completion in May. Engines and landing gear were installed by September 2020.

=== Testing ===
On October 7, 2020, Boom Supersonic rolled out the XB-1 in a promotional, with an announcement that the maiden flight was now expected in 2021. By early 2021, it stated that flight tests were expected no earlier than September 2022. On July 26, 2021, Boom began testing and evaluating a forward-looking vision system as part of preparations for flight tests of the XB-1.

In January 2022, Boom began conducting engine run-ups using the XB-1 in preparation for taxi tests and the first flight later in 2022. In May 2022, fixed-position ground testing was completed, with engine run-up done on all three engines. Undercarriage and flight systems were tested and deemed ready. Taxi runs, and actual flight runs were expected in late 2022. Further delays as of February 2023 pushed the expected first flight to mid-2023.

In August 2023, the aircraft received its experimental certification of airworthiness from the Federal Aviation Administration (FAA). Medium-speed taxi testing was performed in November 2023, with the aircraft reaching a top speed of 94 knots. Following testing, Boom delayed the first test flight to early 2024 to implement safety improvements. The three improvements identified were upgrading the landing gear for increased reliability, optimizing engine intakes for improved resistance to engine stall, and adjusting the aircraft's dampers for improved stability and control.

The XB-1 performed its first flight test on March 22, 2024, flown by test pilot Bill Shoemaker from Mojave Air and Space Port.

On April 16, 2024, the FAA issued a special license for the XB-1 to exceed Mach 1 at the nearby Black Mountain Supersonic Corridor. Test flights to Mach 1.1, 1.2, and 1.3 were planned for later in 2024.

On August 26, 2024, the XB-1 took off from Mojave, California, for its second test flight, piloted by test pilot Tristan Brandenburg.

On January 28, 2025, the XB-1 performed its first supersonic test flight from Mojave Air and Spaceport, piloted by test pilot Brandenburg. It went supersonic three times, reaching a top speed of Mach 1.1, being the first privately developed jet aircraft to do so. XB-1 performed its second supersonic flight and final planned test flight on February 10, 2025, concluding the test program. The company said XB-1 had achieved supersonic flight without generating an audible sonic boom that reached the ground after refining its sonic boom models and improving algorithms for predicting Mach cutoff conditions.

The aircraft is planned to be put on display in the lobby of Boom Technology's headquarters in Centennial, Colorado, after the conclusion of its test program.

== Design ==
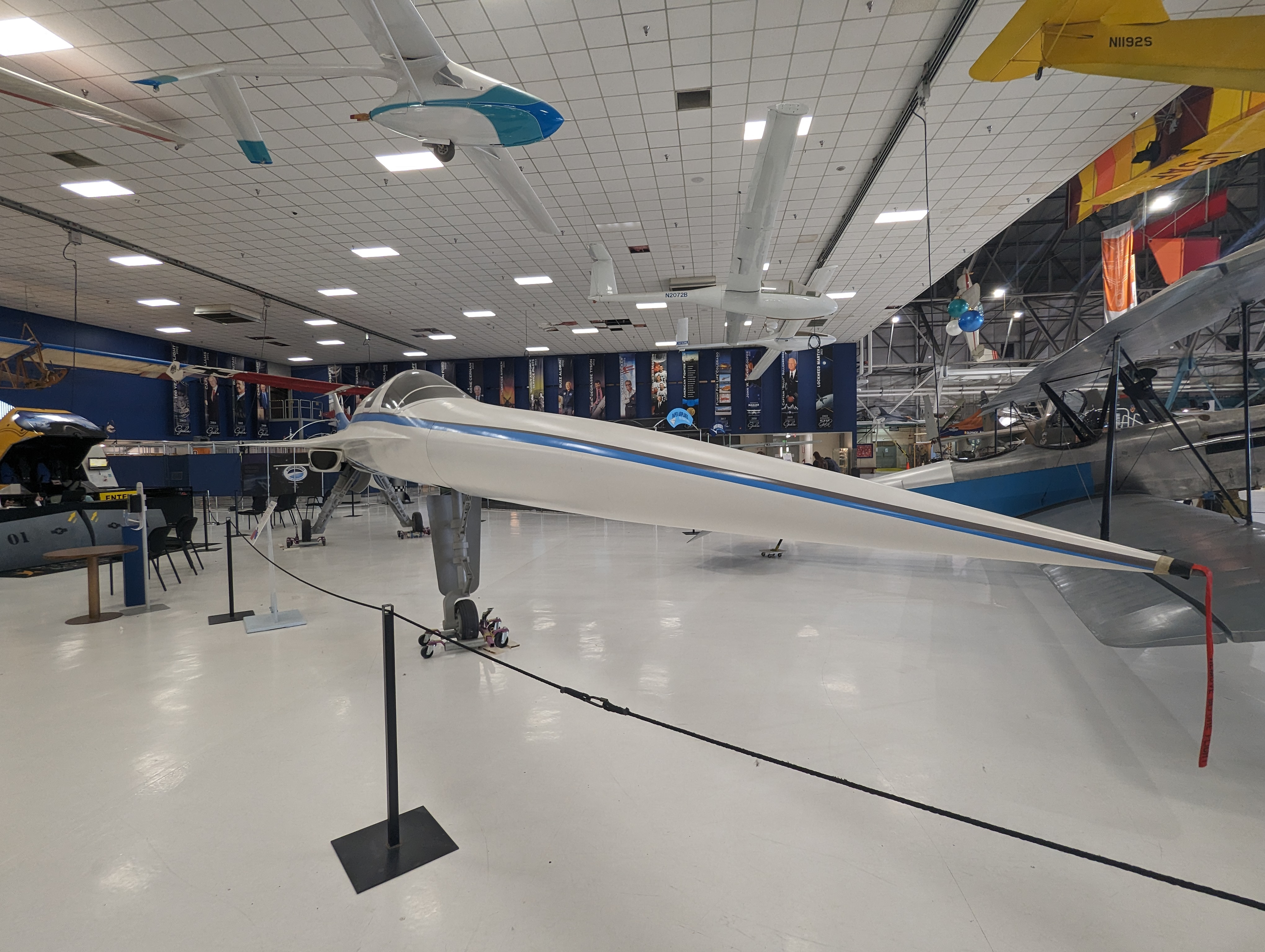
A non-flying mockup of the XB-1 at Wings Over the Rockies Air and Space Museum

The XB-1 "Baby Boom" is 68 feet (21 m) long with a 17 ft (5.2 m) wingspan and a 13,500-pound (6,100 kg) maximum take-off weight. Powered by three General Electric J85 engines with variable geometry inlets and exhaust, the prototype was intended to be able to sustain Mach 2.2 with more than 1,000 nmi (1,900 km; 1,200 mi) of range. As a technology demonstrator for the Boom Overture, the XB-1's trijet configuration matched that of one of the designs for Overture. In 2022, Overture was redesigned to a quadjet configuration. The XB-1 retains the original trijet configuration.

It had a planned two-crew cockpit, with only one seat being fully developed in the demonstrator, and features swept trailing edges. For thermal control, the environmental control system used the fuel as a heat sink to absorb cabin heat. The space for a second seat was taken up by testing equipment.

=== Materials ===
The XB-1 is constructed of lightweight composites, titanium and stainless steel. Materials for the hot leading edges and 307 °F (153 °C) nose, and epoxy materials for cooler parts, are provided by Dutch TenCate Advanced Composites, high-temperature materials supplier for the SpaceX Falcon 9. The airframe is primarily intermediate-modulus carbon fiber/epoxy, with high-modulus fibers for the wing spar caps and bismaleimide pre-preg for the high-temperature leading edges and ribs. The rear section of the fuselage containing the engines is made from 90% titanium and 10% A286 stainless steel alloys.

== Specifications (preliminary) ==
Data from Boom Supersonic, Aviation Week

General characteristics

- Crew: 1 (optional second seat)
- Length: 68 ft (21 m)
- Wingspan: 21 ft (6.4 m)
- Height: 17 ft (5.2 m)
- Max takeoff weight: 13,500 lb (6,123 kg)
- Powerplant: 3 × GE J85-15 afterburning turbojet, 2,925 lbf (13.01 kN) thrust each dry, 4,300 lbf (19 kN) with afterburner

Performance

- Maximum speed: Mach 1.1
- Range: 1,000 nmi (1,200 mi, 1,900 km) (unconfirmed)

== See also ==
- Supersonic transport
- Supersonic business jet
- Lockheed Martin X-59 QueSST

Related development

- Boom Overture
