= Paul Soubry =

Canadian business executive

Paul Soubry, formerly President and Chief Executive Office (CEO) of StandardAero, followed by President and Chief Executive Officer (CEO) of NFI Group Inc. Currently Executive Champion of the Manitoba-Canada Defence Alliance which was launched from the Manitoba Aerospace & Defence Association.

Soubry has a sales, marketing, business development, and operations background, with experience in business transformation and LEAN manufacturing. Soubry worked for 24 years with StandardAero (a leading aviation service provider), starting as a Marketing Assistant in 1984 and progressing to President and Chief Executive Officer. Most recently he spent 17 years as President and Chief Executive Officer of NFI Group Inc. a publicly traded and leading global and independent manufacturer of buses and motorcoaches and retired in December 2025.

Soubry attended St Paul's High School in Winnipeg, holds a Bachelor of Commerce (Honours) degree from the University of Manitoba and completed the Executive Development program at the Harvard Business School. He also completed the Canadian Securities Course and is a member of the Institute of Corporate Directors, having graduated from the Directors Education Program at the Rotman School of Management, University of Toronto.

Soubry was the Chair of the University of Manitoba Front and Centre Capital Campaign that raised over $625 million (the largest philanthropic investment in Manitoba's history), is a Director on the Boards of the Winnipeg Jets / True North Sports & Entertainment and The Wawanesa Mutual Insurance Company, The Northwest Company, is the Chair of the Board of the Mondetta Clothing Company. Paul is an active supporter of United Way Winnipeg and the University of Manitoba sitting on the Board of Directors of the Associates of the Asper School of Business and Chairs the International Distinguished Entrepreneur Award (IDEA) that has been active since 1984.

He speaks regularly on leadership, innovation and technology, and business. Soubry was named to “Canada’s Top 40 Under 40” in 2003, was inducted in the Canadian Manufacturers and Exporters Hall of Fame in 2014, and was named Canada's Top CEO of the Year by National Post in 2016. In 2018, he was named recipient of the University of Manitoba's Distinguished Alumni Lifetime Achievement Award, which recognizes significant contributions to profession, community, and the University of Manitoba. In 2020, he received the Canadian Council for the Advancement of Education's (CCAE) Friend of Education Award, recognizing outstanding service to post-secondary or independent school education and leadership to advance education in Canada. In 2022, Soubry was awarded an Honorary Doctor of Laws from the University of Manitoba and in 2026 was inducted into the Manitoba Business Hall of Fame and received the William G. Ross Lifetime Award being inducted into the Canadian Urban Transportation Hall of Fame.
