= Exosonic =

Defunct American company designing supersonic transport aircraft

Exosonic, Inc was an American startup company that were designing a supersonic transport aircraft. The company was hoping to receive certification for their aircraft by 2029. Exosonic announced in November 8, 2024 that the company would be shutting down.

== History ==
The company was founded in 2019. In August 2020 they were awarded a $1 million small business innovation research contract by the United States Air Force to prototype their aircraft for use as Air Force One.

== Aircraft ==
Exosonic's proposed aircraft was a Mach 1.8 airliner with 70 seats. In June 2021 the design was undergoing scale-model wind tunnel testing. The aircraft was under contract to be modified for possible function as Air Force One.

== See also ==
- Aerion
- Boom Supersonic
- Hermeus
- Spike Aerospace
