= Air Force One =

USAF aircraft carrying the US president

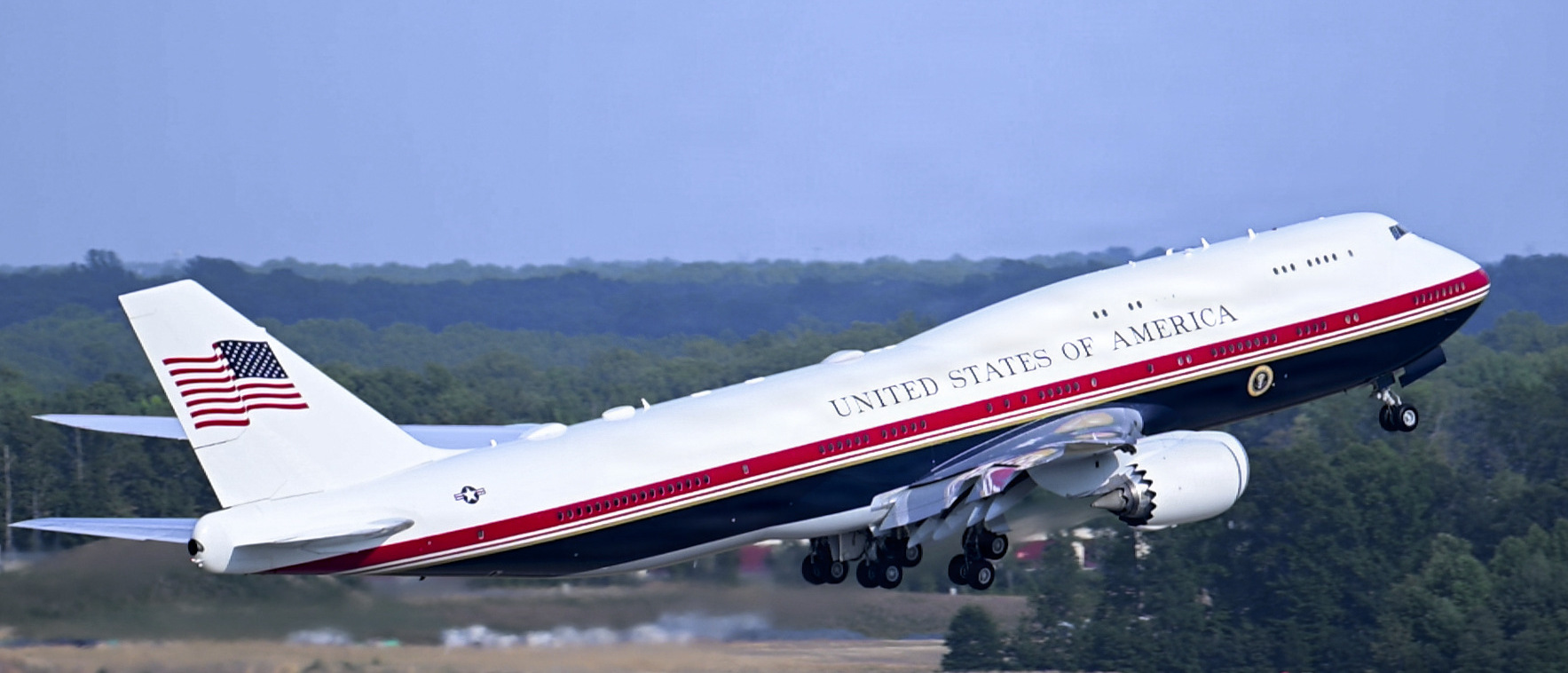
- The new Air Force One, a Boeing VC-25B Bridge, in service since July 2026

Air Force One is the official air traffic control–designated call sign for a United States Air Force aircraft carrying the President of the United States. The term is commonly used to denote U.S. Air Force aircraft modified and used to transport the president, and as a metonym for the primary presidential aircraft, VC-25 or VC-25B, although it can be used to refer to any Air Force aircraft the president travels on.

The idea of designating specific military aircraft to transport the president arose during World War II when military advisors in the Department of War were concerned about the risk of using commercial airlines for presidential travel. In 1944, the Douglas C-54 Skymaster was converted for use as the first purpose-built presidential aircraft. Dubbed the Sacred Cow and operated by the U.S. Army Air Force, it carried President Franklin D. Roosevelt to the Yalta Conference in February 1945 and was used for another two years by President Harry S. Truman.

The "Air Force One" call sign was created in 1954, after a Lockheed Constellation carrying President Dwight D. Eisenhower entered the same airspace as a commercial airline flight using the same flight number. Since the introduction of SAM 26000 in 1962, the primary presidential aircraft has carried the distinctive livery designed by Raymond Loewy.

Other aircraft designated as Air Force One have included another Lockheed Constellation, Columbine III; three Boeing 707s, introduced in the 1960s and 1970s; and since 1990, two Boeing VC-25A (highly customized Boeing 747-200B) aircraft. The Boeing VC-25B Bridge, a modified Boeing 747-8 received as a gift from the Qatari government, entered service on 1 July 2026. The US Air Force has ordered two Boeing 747-8s, designated Boeing VC-25Bs, to serve as the next presidential aircraft; these are expected to enter service no earlier than 2027 or 2028.

From time to time, presidents have invited other world leaders to travel with them on Air Force One. In 1973, President Richard Nixon invited Soviet leader Leonid Brezhnev to fly with him to California from Washington, D.C. In 1983, President Ronald Reagan and Queen Elizabeth II toured the U.S. West Coast aboard the aircraft.

== History ==
=== 20th century ===
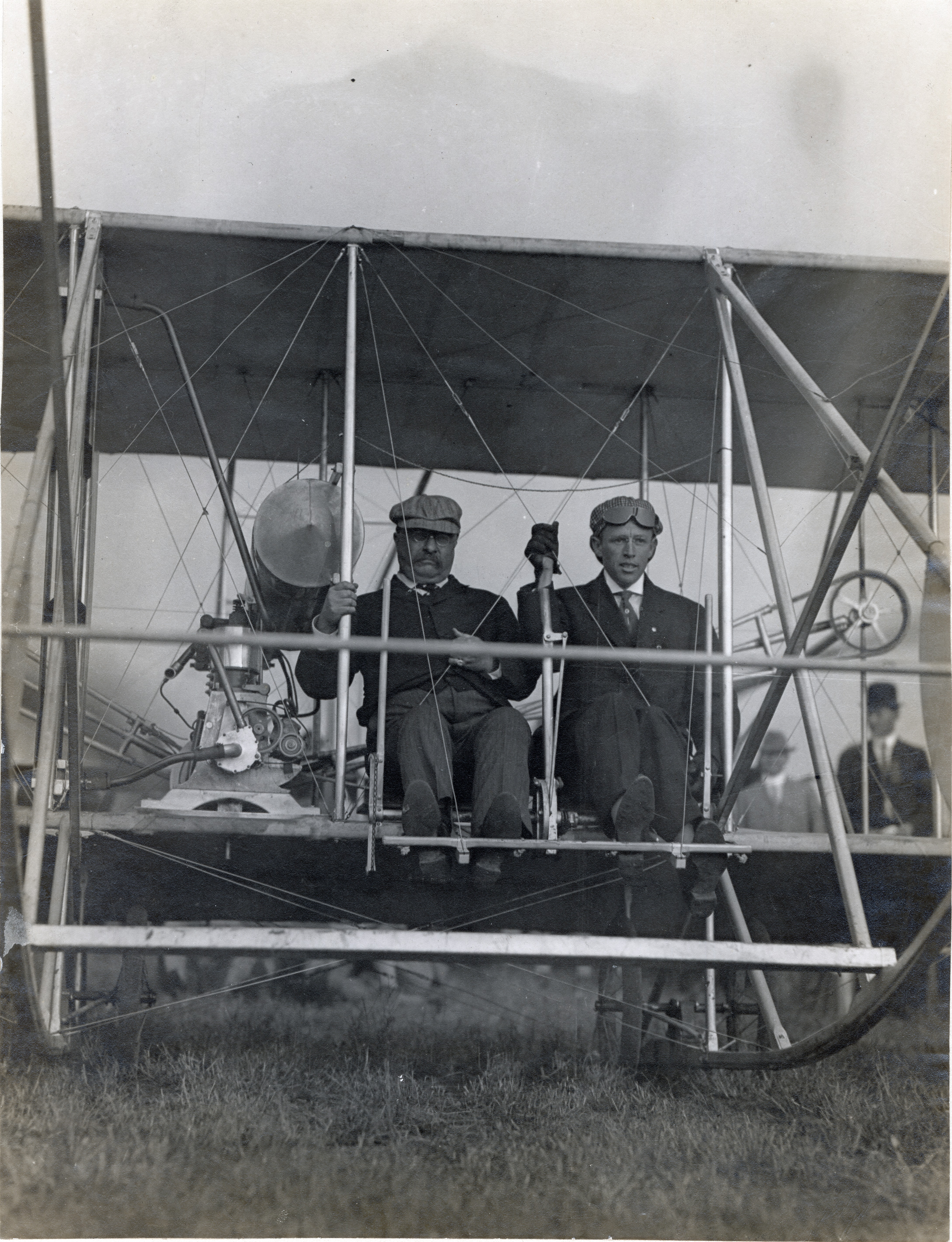
Theodore Roosevelt and pilot Arch Hoxsey before their 1910 flight in St. Louis

On 11 October 1910, Theodore Roosevelt became the first US president to fly in an aircraft, an early Wright Flyer from Kinloch Field near St. Louis, Missouri. He was no longer in office at the time, having been succeeded by William Howard Taft. The record-making occasion was a brief overflight of the crowd at a county fair but was nonetheless the beginning of presidential air travel.

==== First presidential aircraft ====
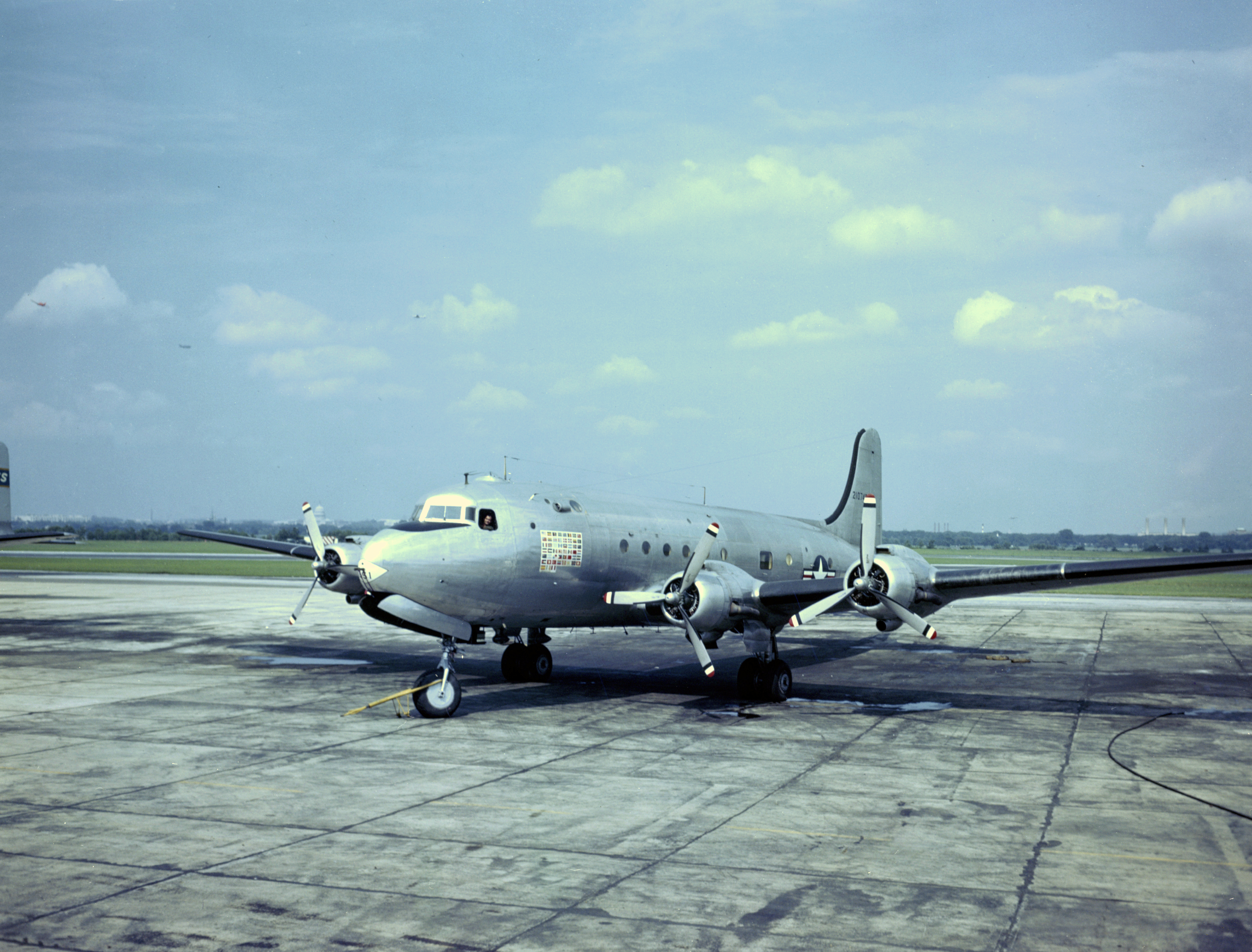
President Franklin D. Roosevelt's Douglas C-54 Skymaster aircraft, nicknamed the Sacred Cow

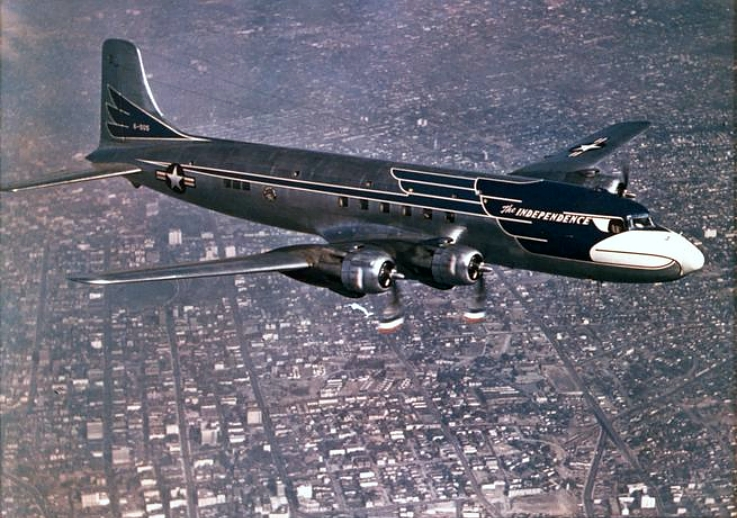
The VC-118 Independence used primarily by President Harry S. Truman

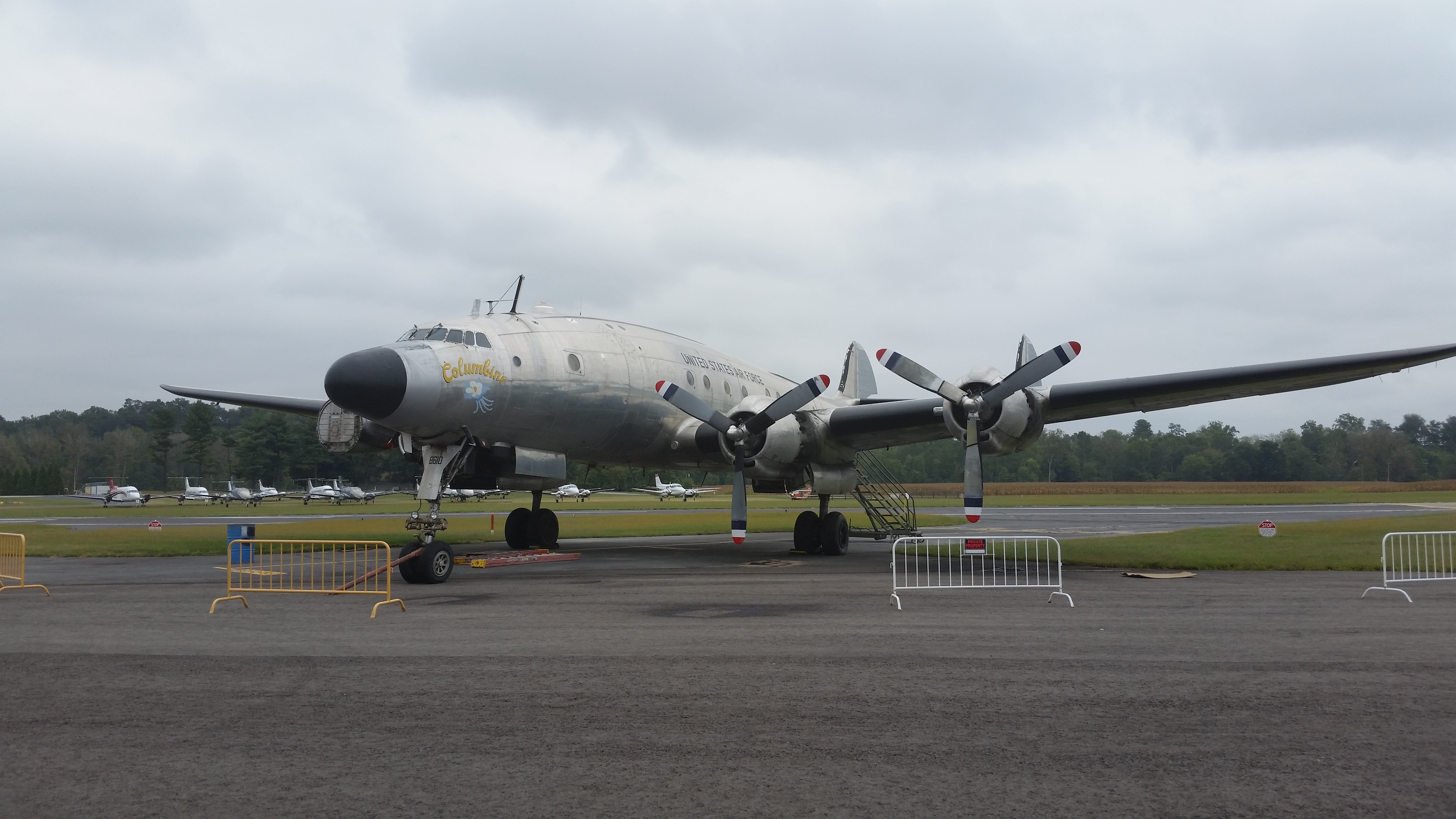
The VC-121 Columbine II, shown here while undergoing restoration in 2016, used by President Dwight Eisenhower

Franklin D. Roosevelt was the first president to fly in an aircraft while in office. The first aircraft obtained specifically for presidential travel was a Douglas Dolphin amphibian modified with luxury upholstery for four passengers and a small separate sleeping compartment. Designated RD-2 by the US Navy, it was delivered in 1933 and based at the naval base at Anacostia in Washington, D.C. The aircraft remained in service as a presidential transport from 1939.

During World War II, German submarines operating in the Atlantic Ocean made air travel the preferred method of VIP transatlantic transportation. In 1943, Roosevelt traveled to the Casablanca Conference in Morocco on the Dixie Clipper, a Pan Am-crewed Boeing 314 flying boat, on a flight that covered 5,500 miles (8,890 km) in three legs.

Concerned about relying upon commercial airlines to transport the president, officials of the United States Army Air Forces, the predecessor of the US Air Force, ordered the conversion of a military aircraft to accommodate the special needs of the commander-in-chief. In 1943, a C-87A transport, number 41-24159, was modified to carry President Franklin D. Roosevelt on international trips. But after a review of the C-87's controversial safety record, the Secret Service flatly refused to approve the aircraft for presidential carriage. The C-87, a derivative of the Consolidated B-24 Liberator bomber, also carried more militaristic associations than aircraft designed for transport. The aircraft, named Guess Where II, was used to transport senior members of the Roosevelt administration on various trips. In March 1944, it flew Eleanor Roosevelt on a goodwill tour of several Latin American countries. The C-87 was scrapped in 1945.

The Secret Service subsequently reconfigured a Douglas C-54 Skymaster for presidential transport duty. The VC-54C aircraft, nicknamed the Sacred Cow, included a sleeping area, radiotelephone, and retractable battery-powered elevator to lift Roosevelt in his wheelchair. The VC-54C flew President Roosevelt only once, to the Yalta Conference in February 1945.

The National Security Act of 1947, the legislation that created the US Air Force, was signed by President Harry S. Truman aboard the VC-54C. He replaced the VC-54C in 1947 with a modified C-118 Liftmaster, calling it the Independence after his Missouri hometown. It was given a distinctive exterior, as its nose was painted like the head of a bald eagle. The plane included a stateroom in the aft fuselage and a main cabin that could seat 24 passengers or could be made up into 12 sleeper berths. It is now housed at the National Museum of the United States Air Force in Dayton, Ohio.

Eisenhower introduced four propeller-driven aircraft to presidential service. This group included two Lockheed C-121 Constellations: aircraft Columbine II (VC-121A 48-610) and Columbine III (VC-121E 53-7885). They were named by First Lady Mamie Eisenhower for the columbine, official state flower of her adopted home state of Colorado. Two Aero Commanders were also added to the fleet.

Columbine II, the first plane to bear the call sign Air Force One, was a Lockheed Constellation configured for VIP travel that replaced an earlier Constellation called Columbine. Bearing the aircraft registration N8610, the plane would use the call sign "Air Force 8610", regardless of the passengers on the flight. After a 1953 incident in which a commercial flight, Eastern Air Lines 8610, crossed paths with Air Force 8610, which was carrying President Eisenhower over Richmond, Virginia, pilot William G. Draper suggested the standardized designation to avoid any future confusion with civil aviation using a similar call sign. Initially used informally, the designation became official in 1962.

==== Boeing 707s and entry to jet age ====
SAM 970 in the Eisenhower-era livery

Toward the end of Eisenhower's second term, Secretary of State John Foster Dulles commented that Soviet premier Nikita Khrushchev and other senior Soviet officials had begun using the technologically advanced Tupolev Tu-114 aircraft for their travels, and it was no longer dignified for the president to fly in a propeller-driven aircraft. This paved the way for the Air Force's initial procurement of three Boeing 707-120 (VC-137A) jet aircraft, designated SAM (Special Air Missions) 970, 971 and 972, which were constructed at a unit cost of $5.5 million (equivalent to $60.7 million in 2025) and were initially less lavish than the Columbine III that had preceded them.

The high-speed jet technology built into these aircraft enabled presidents from Eisenhower through Nixon to travel long distances more quickly for face-to-face meetings with world leaders. Then-Vice President Richard Nixon first used a VC-137A on his visit to Russia in July 1959 for the opening of the American National Exhibition that became the site of the impromptu Kitchen Debates between Nixon and Khruschev. The following month, Eisenhower became the first president to fly via jet airplane when he used SAM 970, nicknamed "Queenie", to meet German Chancellor Konrad Adenauer in Bonn. During Eisenhower's "Flight to Peace" goodwill tour in December 1959, he visited 11 Asian nations, flying 22,000 miles (35,000 km) in 19 days, twice as fast as he could have covered that distance in one of the Columbines.

SAM 970 to SAM 972 were removed from the presidential role with the January 1963 arrival of the specially built VC-137C designated SAM 26000. The older planes were repainted in the Loewy secondary livery designed for Air Force Two and other non-presidential VIP aircraft. SAM 970 is now on display at The Museum of Flight in Seattle, Washington. SAM 971, best remembered for returning the Americans held during the Iran hostage crisis in 1981, is on display at the Pima Air and Space Museum in Tucson, Arizona. SAM 972 was scrapped in October 1996.

==== Loewy's livery design ====
Raymond Loewy's initial design proposal

The new VC-137C was not yet modified for presidential service when John F. Kennedy took office in 1961. On the recommendation of his wife, Jacqueline Kennedy, he contacted the French-born American industrial designer Raymond Loewy for help in designing new livery and interiors for the VC-137C.

Loewy, who had seen SAM 970, complained to a friend in the White House that it "had a garish orange nose and looked too much like a military plane", Air Force One historian and former Smithsonian curator Von Hardesty told CNN. He offered Kennedy his design consultation services free of charge.

Kennedy chose a red-and-gold design from one of Loewy's initial concept sketches, and asked him to render the design all in blue. Loewy also drew inspiration from the first printed copy of the United States Declaration of Independence, suggesting the widely spaced and upper case "United States of America" legend in Caslon typeface. He chose to expose the polished aluminum fuselage on the bottom side and used two blues, steel blue associated with the early republic and the presidency and a more contemporary water blue , to represent an America both rooted in the past and flying inexorably into the future. The presidential seal was added to both sides of the fuselage near the nose and a large American flag was painted on the tail. Loewy's work won immediate praise from the president and the press. The cheatline suggested a sleek and horizontal image that mirrored America's Jet Age optimism and prosperity of the era, and today signifies its legacy and tradition.

Loewy's VC-137C livery was adapted for the larger VC-25A when it entered service in 1990, and the secondary variation (without the darker blue cheatline and cap over the cockpit) is still in use on USAF C-40, C-37, C-32, and C-20 aircraft in standard (non-presidential) VIP configurations. The presidential paint scheme can also be seen on Union Pacific 4141, the locomotive used in George H. W. Bush's funeral train.

==== SAM 26000 ====
Under John F. Kennedy, presidential air travel entered the jet age. Although he could use the Eisenhower-era jets for trips to Canada, France, Austria, and the United Kingdom, when he came into office, his primary aircraft domestically was still a prop powered Douglas VC-118A Liftmaster. In October 1962, the modified long-range Boeing VC-137C Stratoliner SAM 26000, featuring livery designed by Loewy, was delivered and immediately became an important element of the Kennedy administration's brand.

SAM 26000 was in service from 1962 to 1998, serving presidents Kennedy to Clinton. On 22 November 1963, SAM 26000 carried President Kennedy to Dallas, Texas, where it served as the backdrop as the Kennedys greeted well-wishers at Dallas's Love Field. Later that afternoon, Kennedy was assassinated, and Vice President Lyndon Johnson assumed the office of president. He took the oath of office aboard SAM 26000 before departing to Washington, D.C. Later, in January 1973, SAM 26000 took Johnson's body home to Texas after his state funeral in Washington.

Johnson used SAM 26000 to travel extensively domestically and to visit troops in South Vietnam during the Vietnam War. SAM 26000 served President Nixon on several groundbreaking overseas voyages, including his famous visit to the People's Republic of China in February 1972 and his trip to the Soviet Union later that year, both firsts for an American president. Nixon dubbed the plane the "Spirit of '76" in honor of the forthcoming bicentennial of the United States; that logo was painted on both sides of the plane's nose.

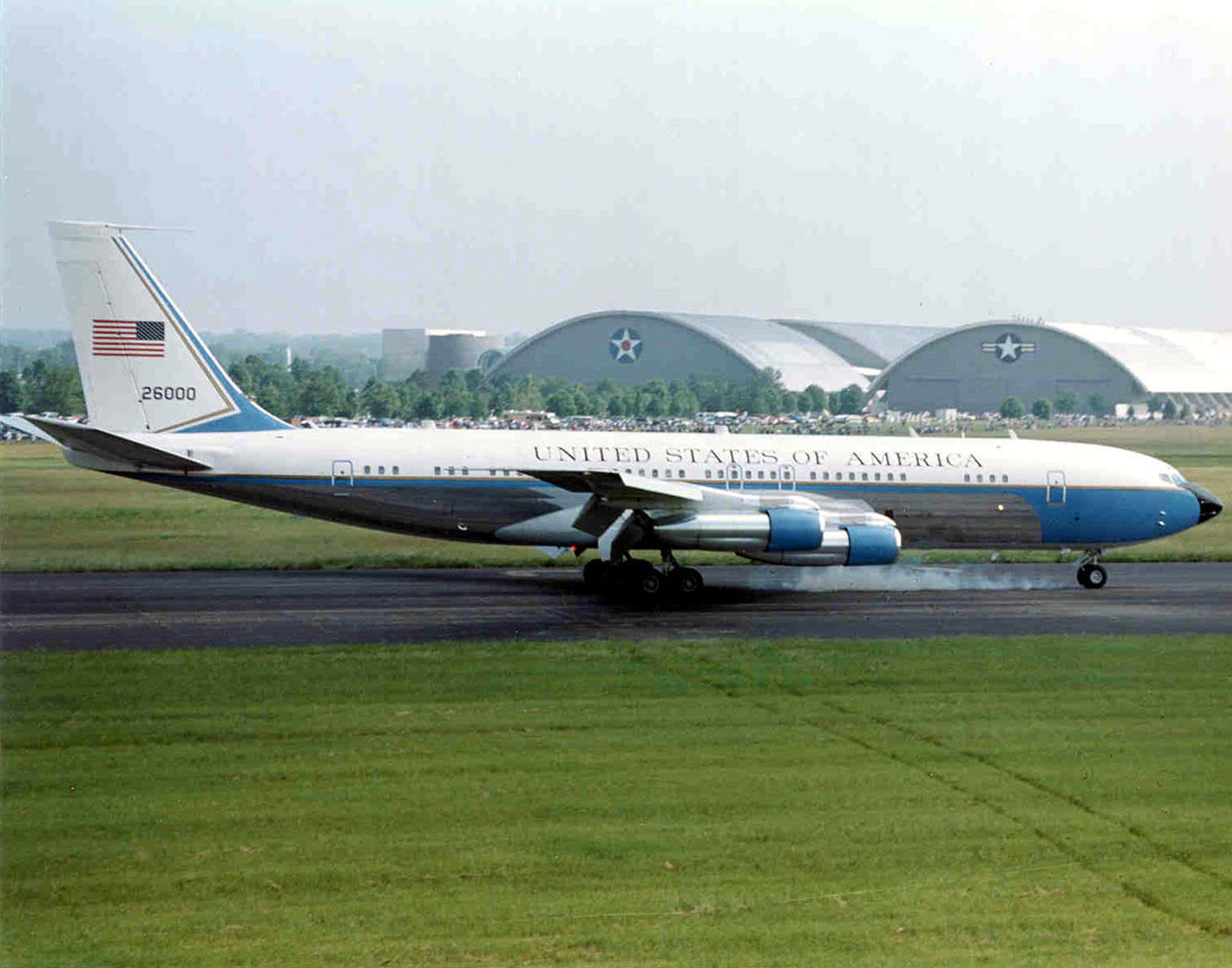
SAM 26000 used for President Kennedy through Clinton, shown in AF2 livery

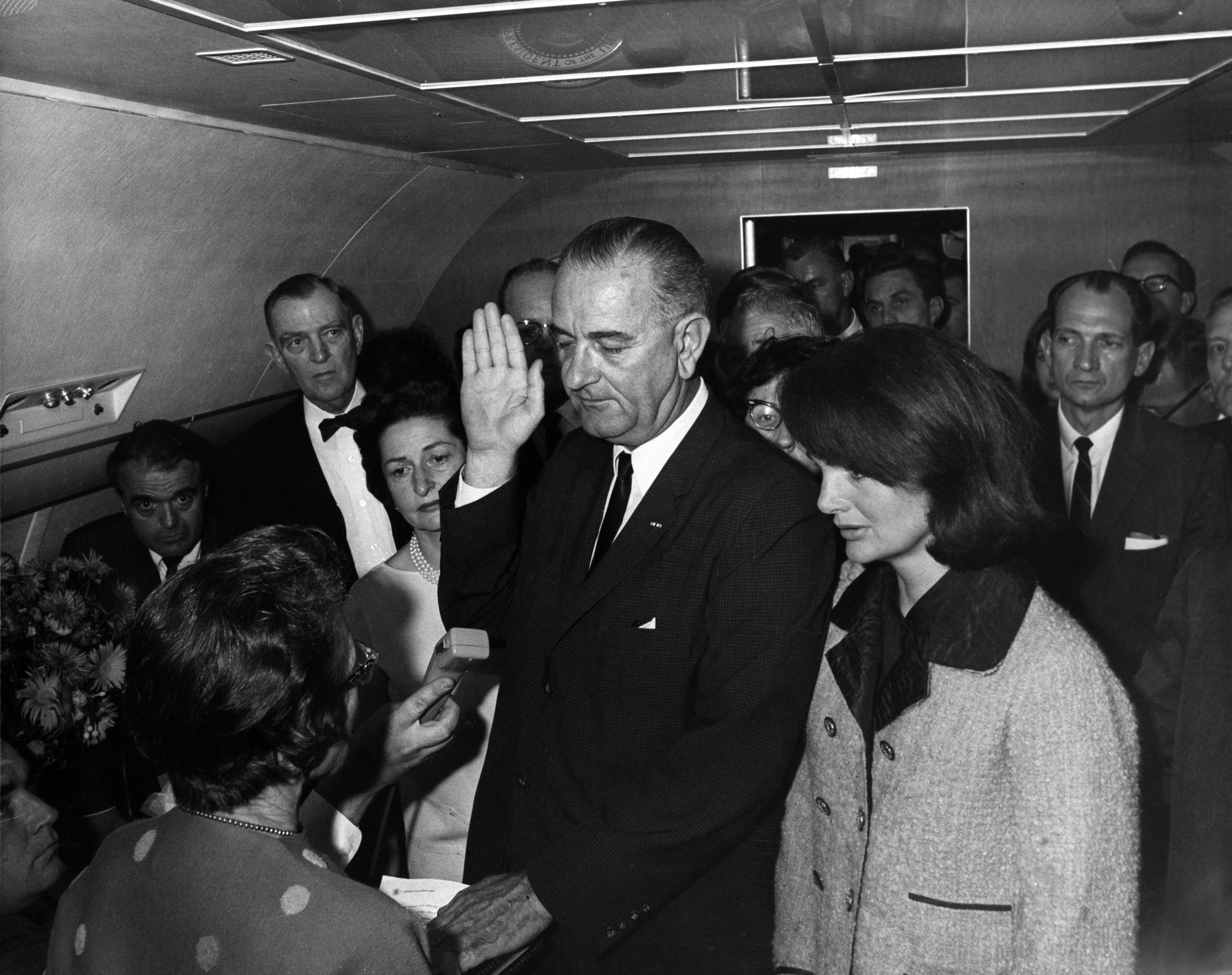
Vice President Lyndon B. Johnson is sworn in as president aboard SAM 26000 following John F. Kennedy's assassination.

==== SAM 27000 ====
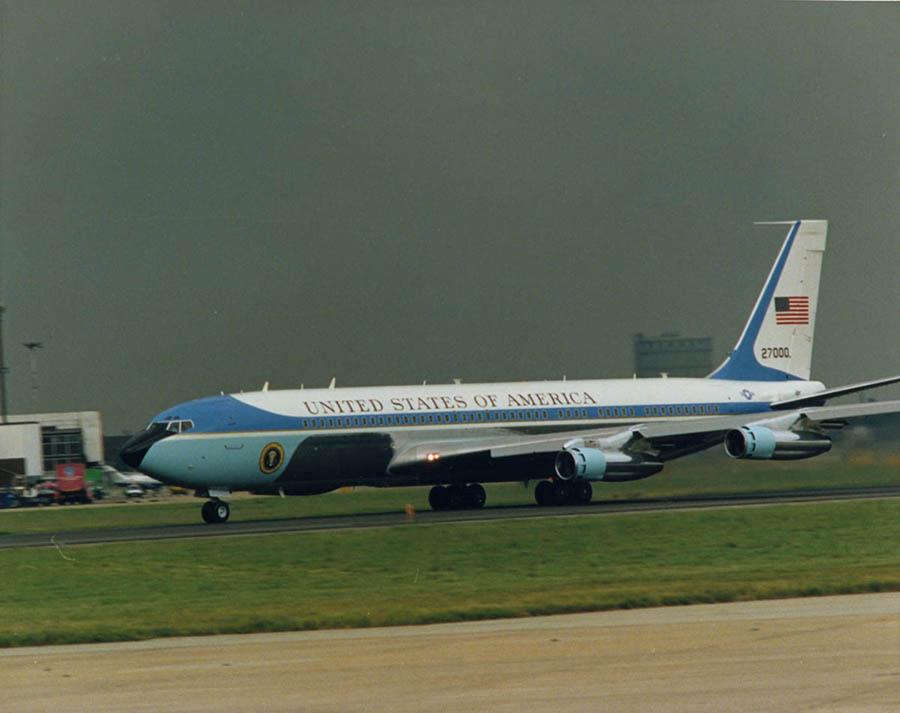
SAM 27000 served presidents Nixon to George W. Bush.

SAM 26000 was replaced in December 1972 by another VC-137C, Special Air Mission 27000, although SAM 26000 was relegated to non-presidential VIP status (and repainted without the darker blue cap and cheatline), it served as a backup to SAM 27000 until it was finally retired in 1998.

In June 1974, while President Nixon was on his way to a scheduled stop in Syria, Syrian fighter jets intercepted Air Force One to act as escorts. The crew was not informed in advance, so took evasive action including a dive.

After announcing his intention to resign the presidency, Nixon boarded SAM 27000 (with call sign "Air Force One") to travel to California. Colonel Ralph Albertazzie, then pilot of Air Force One, recounted that after Gerald Ford was sworn in as president, the plane had to be redesignated as SAM 27000, indicating no president was on board the aircraft. Over Jefferson City, Missouri, Albertazzie radioed: "Kansas City, this was Air Force One. Will you change our call sign to Sierra Alpha Mike (SAM) 27000?" Back came the reply: "Roger, Sierra Alpha Mike 27000. Good luck to the president."

==== Boeing VC-25A ====
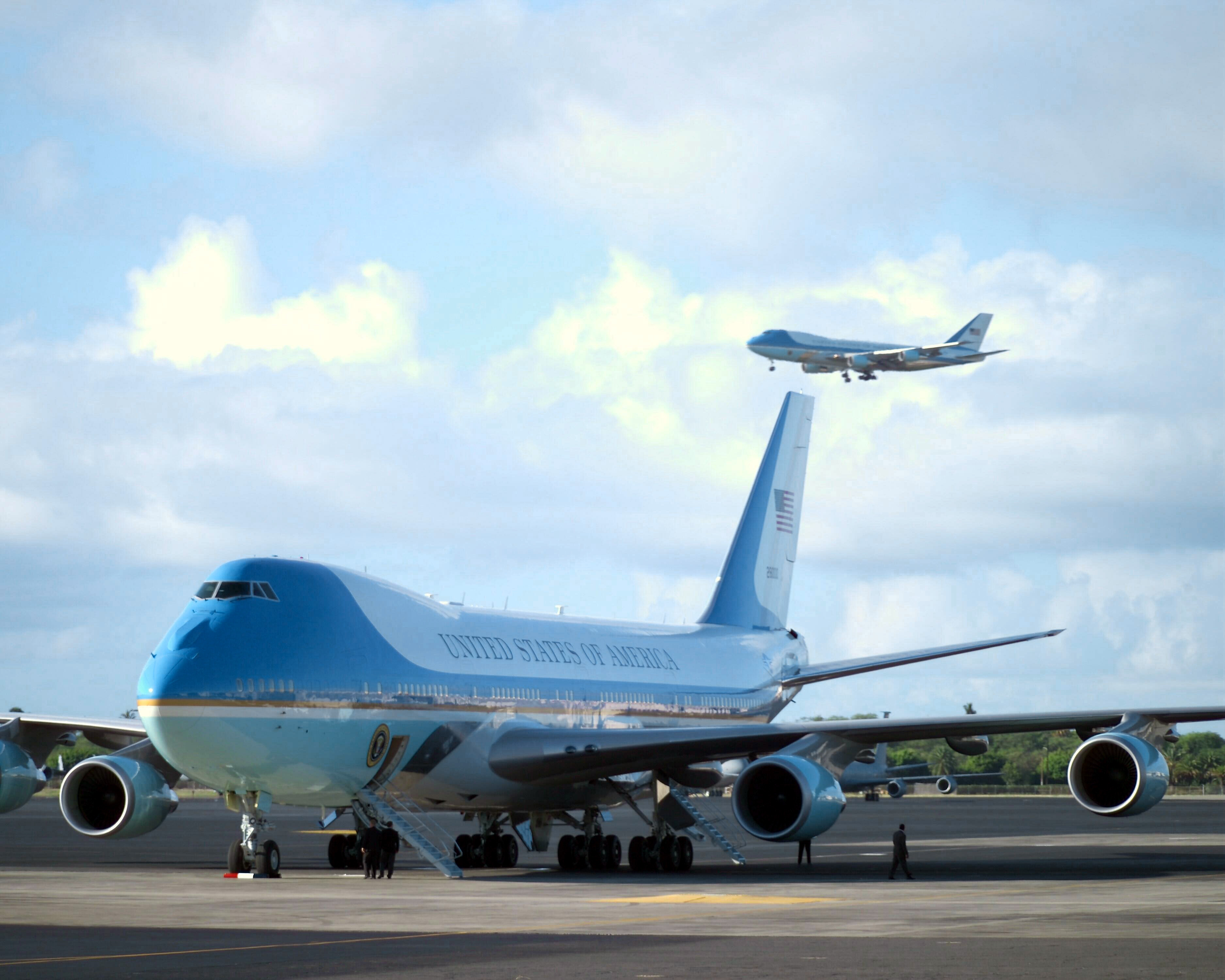
SAM 28000 sits on the ramp as SAM 29000 descends on final approach to Hickam Field with President George W. Bush.

Though Ronald Reagan's two terms as president saw no major changes to Air Force One, the manufacture of the presidential aircraft version of the 747 began during his presidency. The USAF issued a request for proposal in 1985 for two wide-body aircraft with a minimum of three engines and an unrefueled range of 6,000 miles (9,700 km). Boeing with the 747 and McDonnell Douglas with the DC-10 submitted proposals, and the Reagan Administration ordered two identical 747s to replace the aging 707 VC-137 variants he used. The interior designs, drawn up by First Lady Nancy Reagan, were reminiscent of the American Southwest.

=== 21st century ===
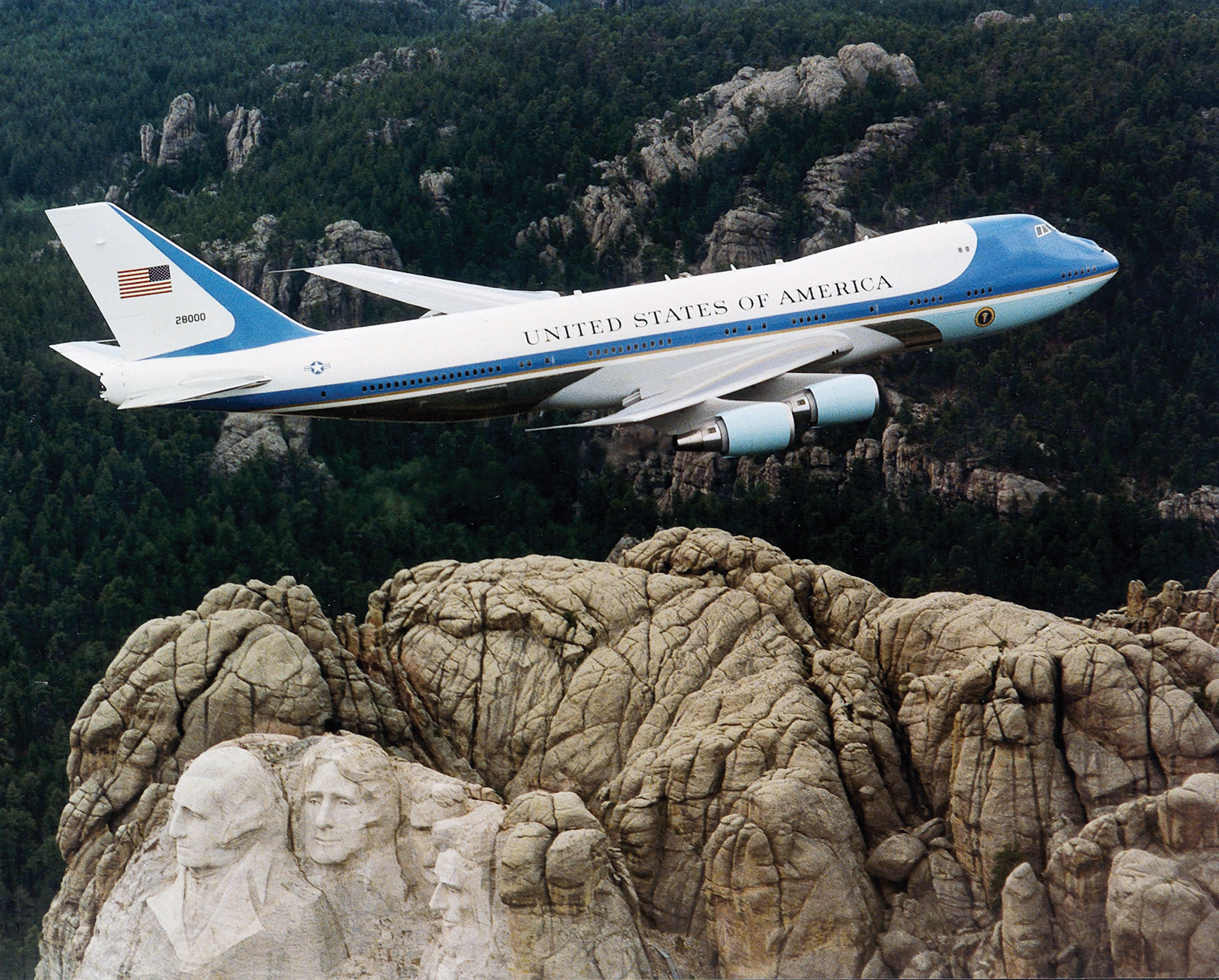
SAM 28000 flying over Mount Rushmore in February 2001

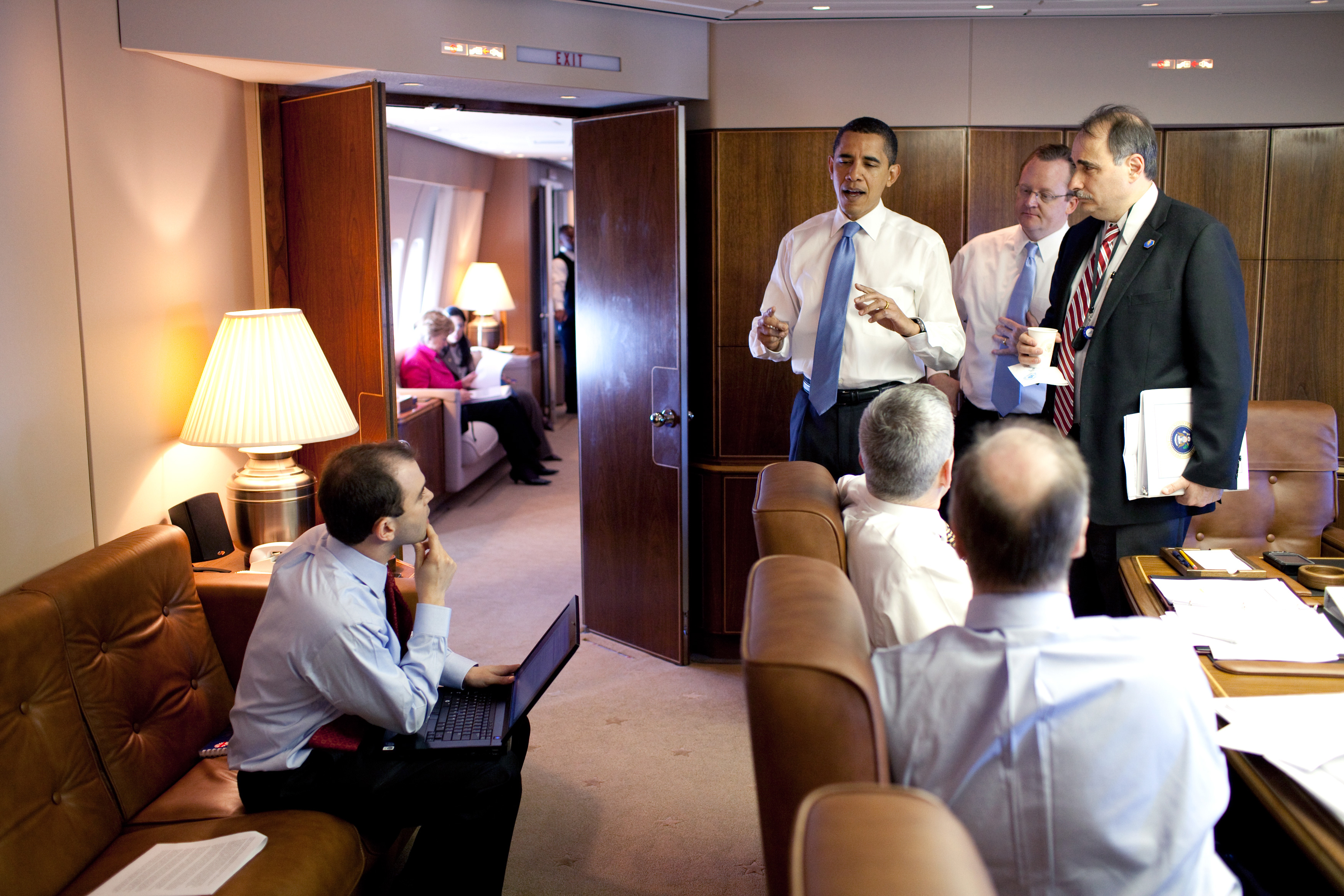
President Barack Obama meets staff mid-flight aboard Air Force One, in the conference room on 3 April 2009.

When President George W. Bush left office in January 2009, he flew to Texas in a VC-25 that used call sign SAM 28000, as it did not carry the current president of the United States. Similar arrangements were made for former presidents Ronald Reagan, Bill Clinton, Barack Obama, and Joe Biden.

After the deaths of former presidents Gerald Ford and Ronald Reagan, VC-25 aircraft flew their remains to their home states of Michigan and California, respectively.

On 27 April 2009, a low-flying VC-25 circled New York City for a photo-op and training exercise, alarming many New Yorkers.

During Joe Biden's 2023 visit to Ukraine, the Air Force One call sign was not used for the C-32 aircraft he flew to Poland; to increase secrecy, the call sign was SAM060.

==== Logistical support ====
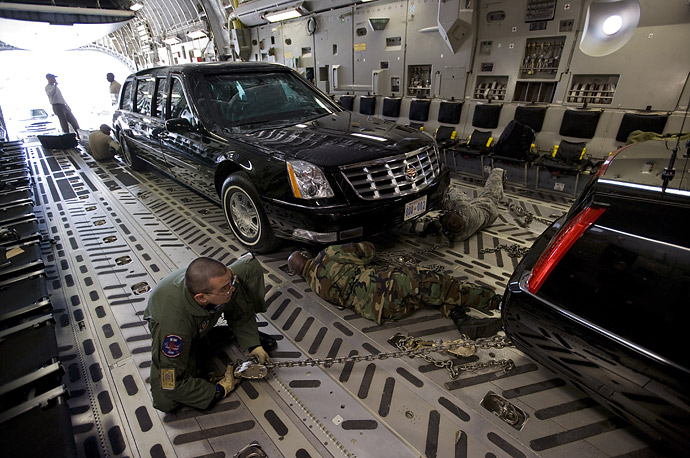
The presidential limousine being sent via Boeing C-17 prior to the arrival of Air Force One

When flying with the President, Air Force One rarely flies alone. It is often accompanied by a fleet of aircraft that can include the back-up VC-25, cargo aircraft, and tankers. In such cases, up to half a dozen cargo aircraft, such as the Boeing C-17 Globemaster III or the Lockheed C-5 Galaxy, precede AF1 by a couple days or more, bringing the presidential limousine and Sikorsky VH-60 Black Hawk helicopters, along with Secret Service personnel and several hundred maintenance crew. Longer trips are accompanied by tankers, such as the McDonnell Douglas KC-10 Extender, to limit the need to stop for fuel and ensure that AF1 does not take fuel from an unvetted source.

The support aircraft will often use several airports in a region to minimize the impact to one particular airport, and Secret Service may also preposition a Gulfstream C-37B or Boeing E-4 in a neighboring region for backup.

In addition to the president, staff, and flight crew, a VC-25A can carry 102 guests in typical domestic business-class seats. The back-up VC-25 typically flies with 14 crew, two pilots, six flight crew, two cooks, and four flight attendants. When transporting the president, the primary VC-25A has three cooks and 15 flight attendants, 20 or more Secret Service agents, and some 40 members of the presidential press pool. During international state visits, another aircraft may be chartered to accommodate another 150 or more journalists and security personnel.

==== 11 September attacks ====
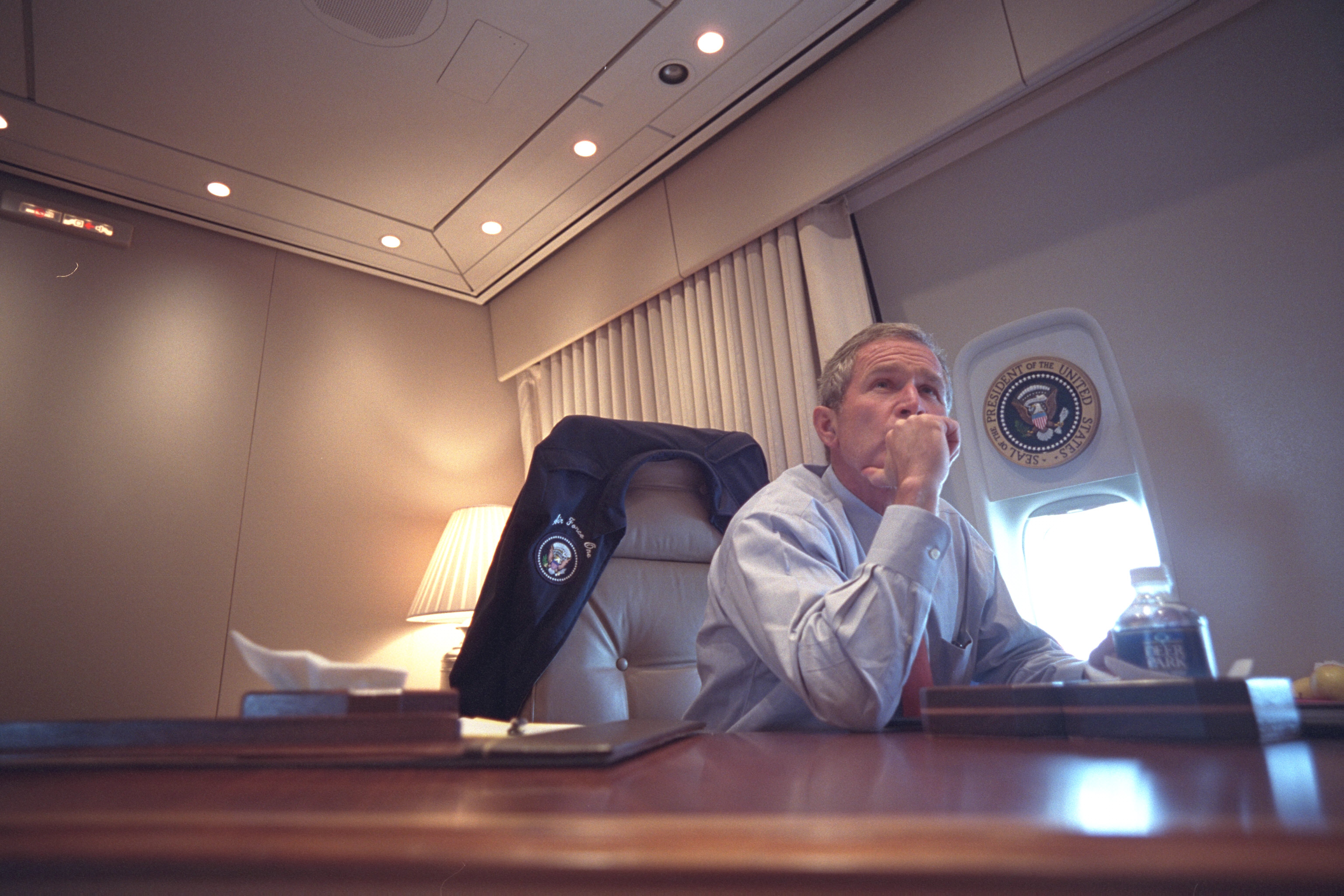
President George W. Bush aboard a VC-25 on the day of the September 11 attacks

On 11 September 2001, George W. Bush was interrupted during his visit of an elementary school in Sarasota, Florida, after an airplane hit the South Tower of the World Trade Center in New York City. He took off on a VC-25 from Sarasota-Bradenton International Airport piloted by Colonel Mark Tillman, the senior pilot of Air Force One that day.

Some time later, air traffic controllers warned Tillman that a passenger jet was nearby and not responding to radio calls. Tillman recalls: "As we got over Gainesville, Florida, we got the word from Jacksonville Center. They said, 'Air Force One you have traffic behind you and basically above you that is descending into you, we are not in contact with them—they have shut their responder [sic] off.' And at that time it kind of led us to believe maybe someone was coming into us in Sarasota, they saw us take off, they just stayed high and are following us at this point. We had no idea what the capabilities of the terrorists were at that point." Tillman then flew Air Force One over the Gulf of Mexico in order, he later said, to test whether the other aircraft would follow. The other jet continued on its route, and Tillman said that it was later explained to him that an airliner had lost its transponder, which normally broadcasts an electronic identification signal, and that the pilots on board neglected to switch to another radio frequency.

Later, Tillman received a warning of an imminent attack on Air Force One. "We got word from the vice president and the staff that 'Angel was next,' indicating the classified call sign for Air Force One. Once we got into the Gulf [of Mexico] and they passed to us that 'Angel was next,' at that point I asked for fighter support. If an airliner was part of the attack, it would be good to have fighters on the wing to go ahead and take care of us." At this point, Tillman said that the plan to fly the president back to Washington, D.C., was aborted for concerns that Air Force One would be attacked at Andrews Air Force Base. Instead, Tillman landed at Barksdale Air Force Base, Louisiana, and Offutt Air Force Base, Nebraska, where the president made a speech. After these stops, the president was returned to Washington, D.C.

The next day, officials at the White House and the Justice Department explained that President Bush did this because there was "specific and credible information that the White House and Air Force One were also intended targets". The White House could not confirm evidence of a threat to Air Force One, and investigation found the original claim to be a result of miscommunication.

== Planned replacement ==
=== VC-25B ===
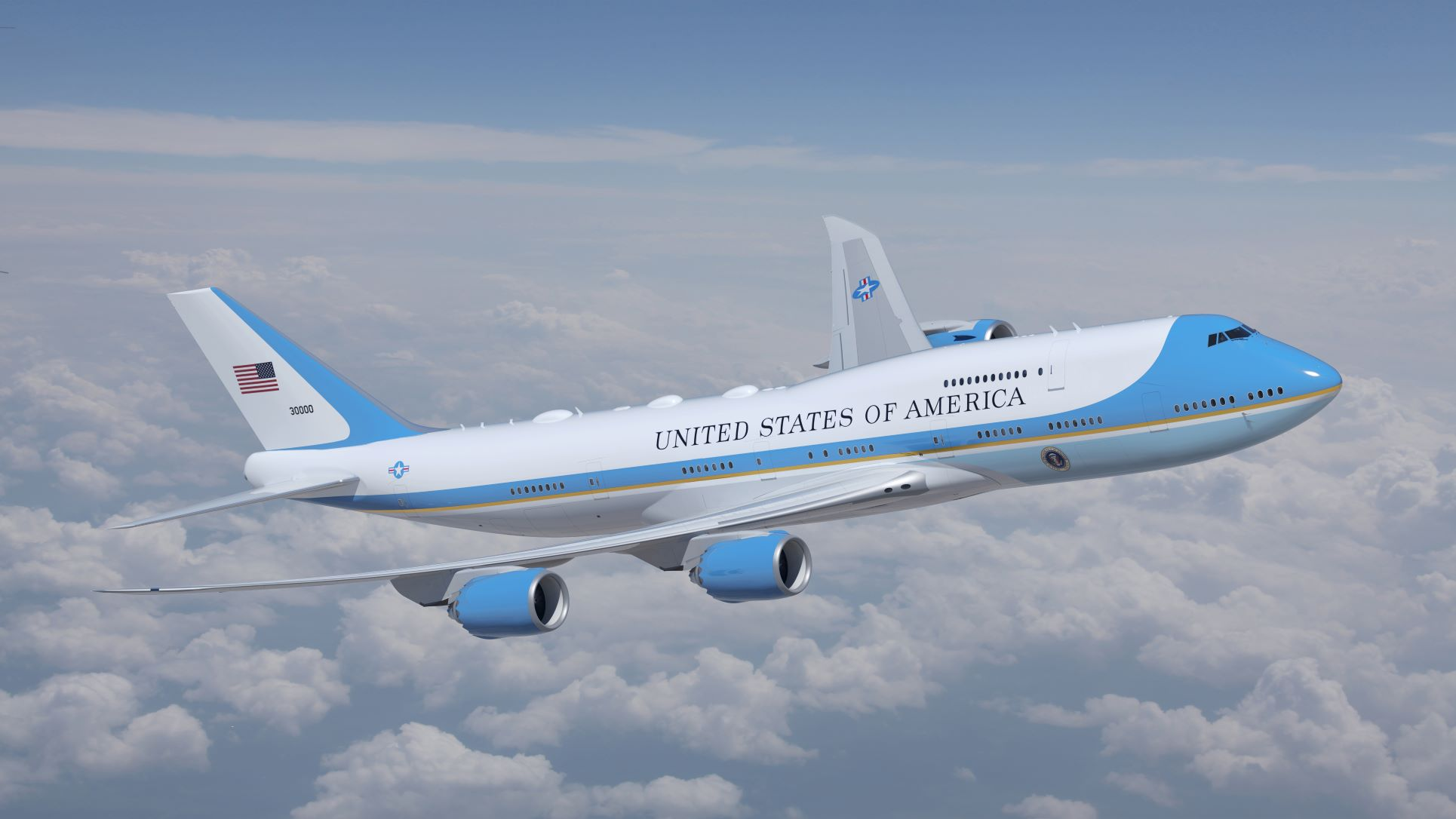
Illustration of the VC-25B color scheme announced in March 2023, later canceled.

The VC-25As are to be replaced as the cost of maintaining the aging systems on their 30-year-old airframes and less efficient GE-CF6 engines has begun to surpass the cost of acquiring a new aircraft. On 28 January 2015, the Air Force announced that the Boeing 747-8I would be the next presidential aircraft. The U.S. Government Accountability Office estimated the total cost at $3.2 billion, and the US Air Force's budget for the program is projected to be nearly $4 billion. In December 2016, Boeing was on contract for preliminary development worth $170 million (~$223 million in 2025).

During his first presidency, Donald Trump renegotiated aspects of the contract with Boeing, and threatened to cancel the program if the overall cost exceeded $4 billion. In an effort to cut costs, the Air Force contracted to purchase two completed but undelivered Transaero 747-8 Intercontinental aircraft from Boeing in 2017.

The following year, Boeing struck a deal with Trump to adorn the new VC-25Bs with a "patriotic color scheme" livery featuring a deep red stripe down the middle of the aircraft and a dark blue underbelly. After the 2020 election, Biden scrapped Trump's color scheme favoring the former robin's egg-blue Air Force One design made public in March 2023. However in 2026, the reelected Trump administration restored the patriotic livery for the two future VC-25Bs, as well as the interim Qatari aircraft and Air Force Two. The first VC-25B is scheduled to be delivered in 2027, while the second will come the following year.

=== Supersonic aircraft ===
In September 2020, the US Air Force announced several presidential and executive airlift directorate contracts signed with aircraft manufacturers to begin development of a supersonic aircraft that could function as Air Force One. Contracts have been signed with Exosonic, Hermeus, and Boom.

=== Former Qatari Royal 747-8 ===
On 21 May 2025, the Trump administration accepted a Boeing 747-8 as a gift from the Royal family of Qatar. The administration planned to use it as the new Air Force One. With an estimated value of US$400 million, this was the most valuable gift extended to the US from a foreign government. For this aircraft to be used as Air Force One, it required extensive inspection and modifications to afford the protection to the president that current Air Force One aircraft required. These modifications were reported to be completed after 2028. On 28 May 2025, the Washington Post reported that no deal had been agreed because Qatar required a memorandum of understanding confirming that any transfer request had been initiated by the US to ensure that Qatar had no legal liability. On 7 July 2025, Pete Hegseth signed the memorandum of understanding.

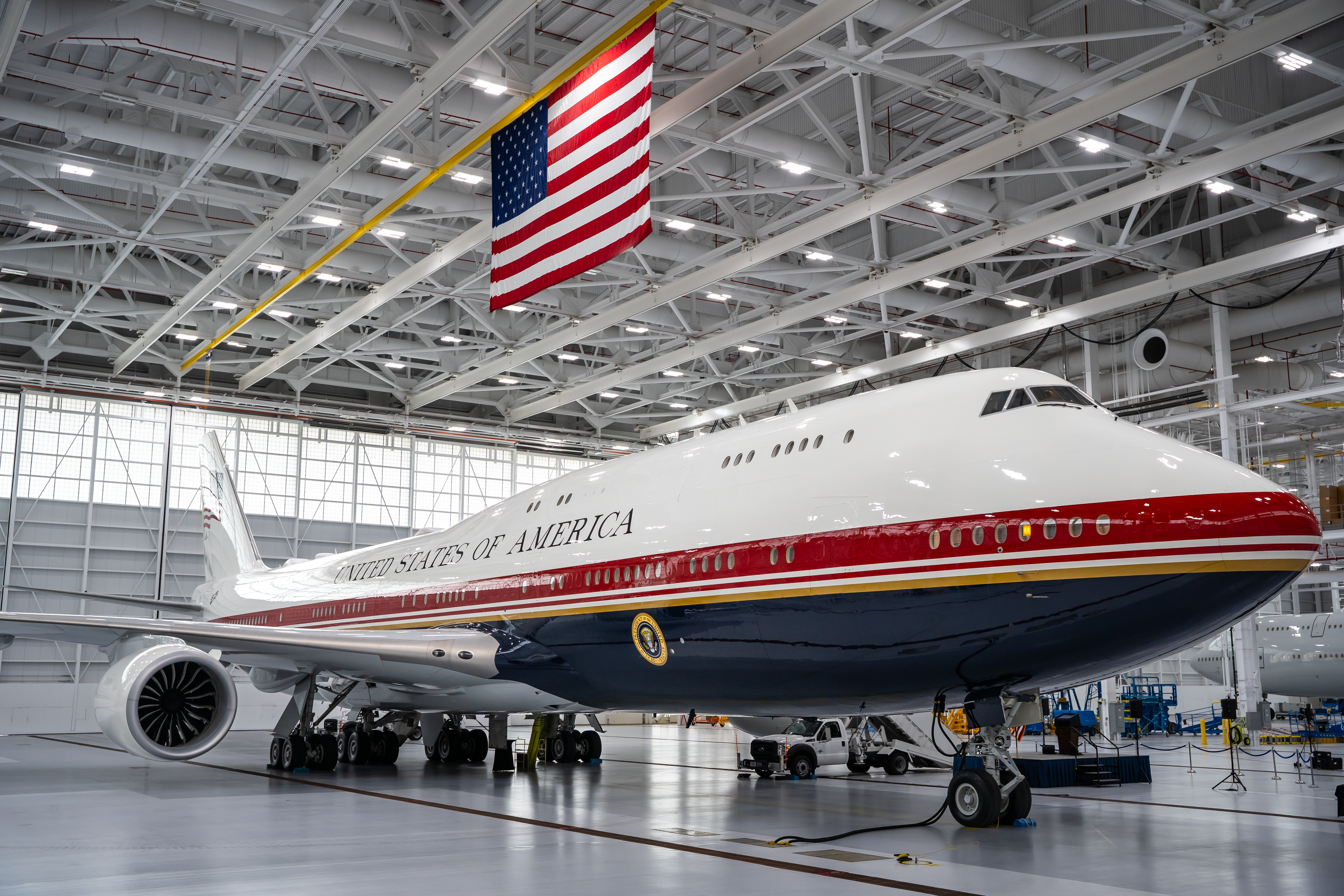
Boeing VC-25B Bridge officially unveiled at Joint Base Andrews.

On 1 May 2026, the Air Force announced that N7478D, now the VC-25B Bridge aircraft, had completed modifications by L3Harris and finished flight testing. The aircraft was painted in Trump's preferred red, white, blue with gold stripe livery and waved American flag tailfin was delivered to the Presidential Airlift Group in summer 2026. On 19 June 2026, the new aircraft was officially unveiled at Joint Base Andrews. Trump took the first flight on the plane as Air Force One on a 1 July trip to North Dakota for the dedication of the Theodore Roosevelt Presidential Library.

The aircraft made its first international flight as Air Force One the following week, when it carried Trump to the 2026 Ankara NATO summit in Turkey on July 7th. The VC-25B Bridge departed for RAF Mildenhall without Trump the following day. Trump was initially reported to have departed for Mildenhall on a VC-25A following the summit. Trump said his departure on the VC-25A was "for old time's sake". However, defense publication TWZ reported that the decision to use the VC-25A came amid heightened security concerns surrounding the president, noting concerns that had been raised about the defensive capabilities of the VC-25B Bridge. The New York Times reported that the swap was precautionary and made at the advice of the US Secret Service rather than in response to a specific threat. The Washington Post later reported that Trump had not flown on the VC-25A, but had instead been secretly transferred to a C-32A, with the VC-25A acting as a decoy.

On 4 July, the plane performed in the D.C. military flyovers during the America 250 celebration. On 19 July, Trump said the VC-25B Bridge would be temporarily taken out of service "in about a month or so" to be "maxed out", referring to planned upgrades to the aircraft. Trump did not specify what would be upgraded. TWZ noted that, unlike the VC-25A, the VC-25B Bridge lacks visible defensive systems. White House press secretary Karoline Leavitt said that Trump would fly on the VC-25A while the bridge aircraft was being upgraded. Trump was expected to continue using the VC-25B Bridge for domestic trips and some international visits to lower-risk destinations before the aircraft was upgraded. The VC-25B Bridge performed flyovers over D.C. during the Freedom 250 Grand Prix on 23 August 2026.

== Other presidential aircraft ==
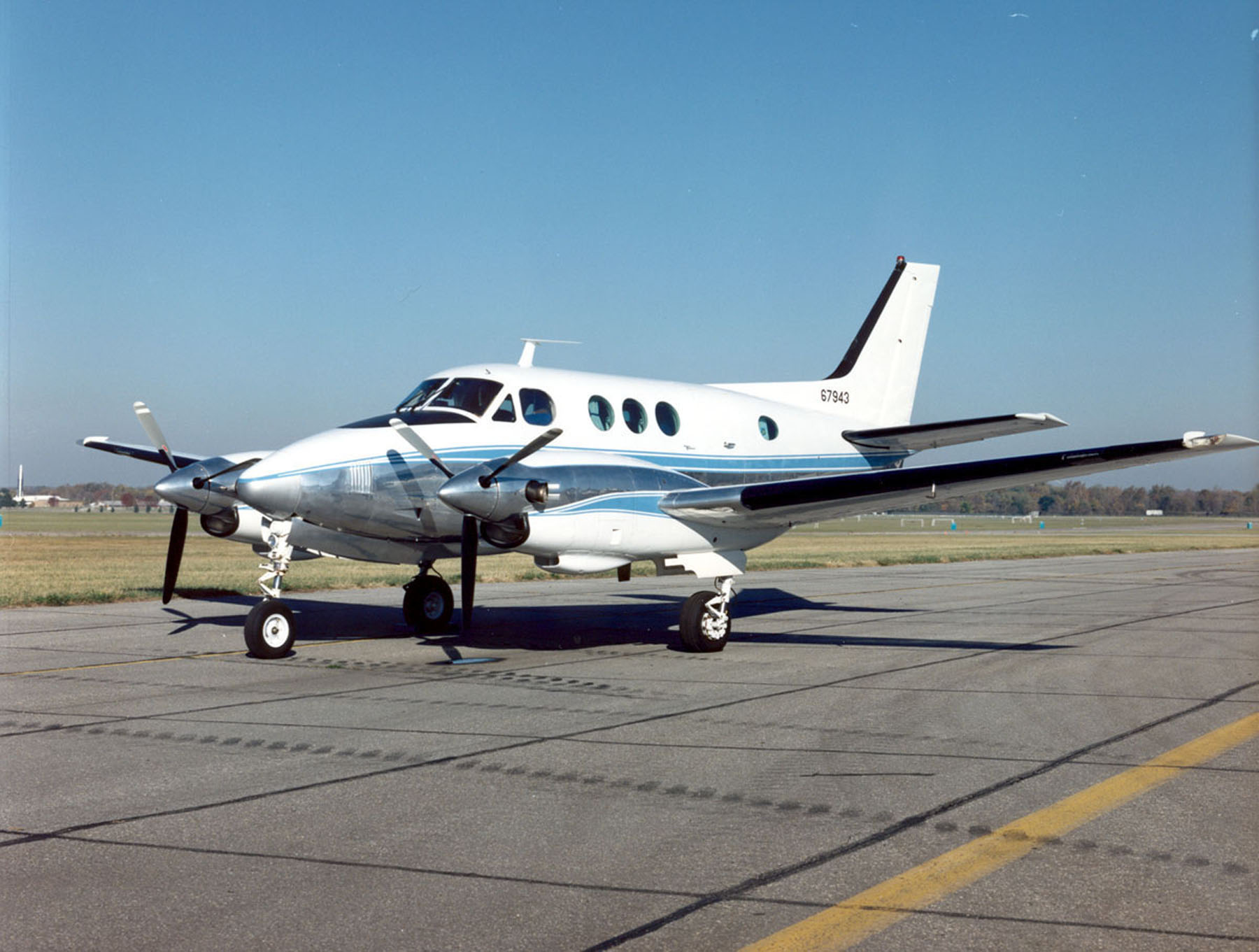
VC-6A used as Air Force One

During the Johnson Administration, the United States Air Force acquired a Beechcraft King Air B90 which was designated VC-6A (66-7943). The aircraft was used to transport President Johnson between Bergstrom Air Force Base and his family ranch near Johnson City, Texas, and was used at least once to transport the President to Princeton, New Jersey. It was referred to as Lady Bird's airplane and later in its service life featured a basic color scheme similar to civilian aircraft. When the President was aboard, the aircraft used the call sign Air Force One.

United Airlines is the only commercial airline to have operated Executive One, the call sign given to a civilian flight on which the US president is aboard. On 26 December 1973, President Richard Nixon and his family flew as commercial passengers on a United DC-10 from Washington Dulles to Los Angeles International Airport. His staff explained that this was done to conserve fuel by not having to fly the usual Boeing 707 Air Force aircraft.

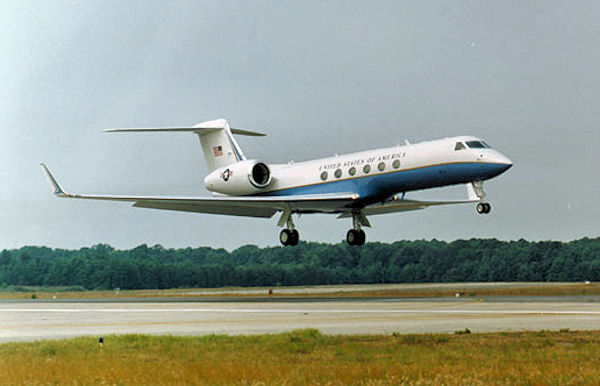
A USAF Gulfstream V in VIP livery

In November 1999, President Bill Clinton flew from Ankara, Turkey, to Cengiz Topel Naval Air Station outside Izmit, Turkey, aboard a marked C-20C (Gulfstream III) using the call sign Air Force One, escorted by three F-16s.

On 8 March 2000, President Clinton flew to Pakistan aboard an unmarked Gulfstream III while another aircraft with the call sign Air Force One flew on the same route a few minutes later. This diversion was reported by several US press outlets.

On 1 May 2003, President George W. Bush flew in the co-pilot seat of a Sea Control Squadron Thirty-Five (VS-35) S-3B Viking from Naval Air Station North Island, California to the aircraft carrier USS Abraham Lincoln off the California coast, where Bush delivered his "Mission Accomplished" speech. During the flight, the aircraft used the call sign of "Navy One" for the first time. This aircraft is now on display at the National Naval Aviation Museum at Naval Air Station Pensacola, Florida.

Barack Obama used the Gulfstream C-37 variant on a personal trip in 2009 to visit the production of August Wilson's Joe Turner's Come and Gone in New York.

Several Boeing C-17 Globemaster IIIs typically accompany the president whenever he travels, carrying the presidential limousines and other support vehicles, and have been rumored to have discreetly transported presidents and vice presidents in and out of Iraq and Afghanistan without using the Air Force One call sign.

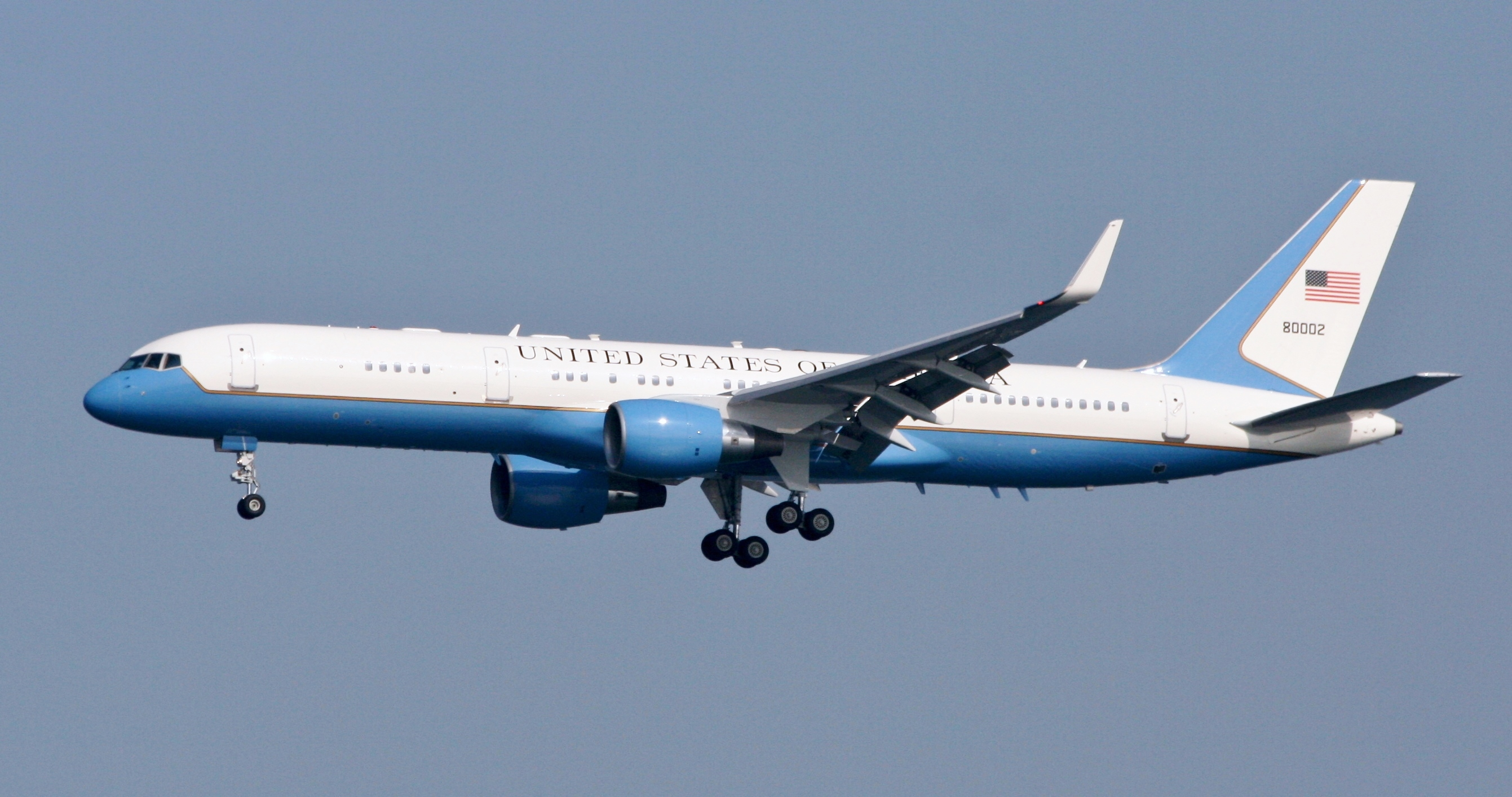
A Boeing C-32 (Boeing 757) that was occasionally used as Air Force One until the arrival of newer C-32s in the 2010s. Today, this plane flies the vice president (serving as Air Force Two) or other senior officials.

Since 1998, the president has occasionally flown aboard an Air Force C-32, a narrow-body jet based on the Boeing 757 airliner. The Air Force bought four C-32s in 1996 to fly the president to airports whose runways were too small to accommodate the larger VC-25, or as emergency backup. Today, these aircraft are used to fly vice presidents and other senior officials. The C-32 has also been used by presidents when use of the VC-25 could present operational risks. For example in 2023 when President Biden traveled to Ukraine via Poland using the C-32 to avoid the publicity of the VC-25. A further example of this was in July 2026, when President Trump, before departing the 2026 NATO summit in Ankara, secretly transferred to a nearby C-32A from the VC-25A that he had boarded seconds earlier, due to a threat from Iran.

In the 2010s, the Air Force acquired a second set of four 757s for presidential transport, assigning them tail numbers 90015, 90016, 90017, and 90018. Service officials do not acknowledge that these aircraft exist, although they are routinely photographed in presidential service.

Vice presidents have used a VC-25 on longer trips, using the Air Force Two call sign.

The president regularly flies in helicopters (call sign Marine One) operated by the U.S. Marine Corps.

== Aircraft on display ==
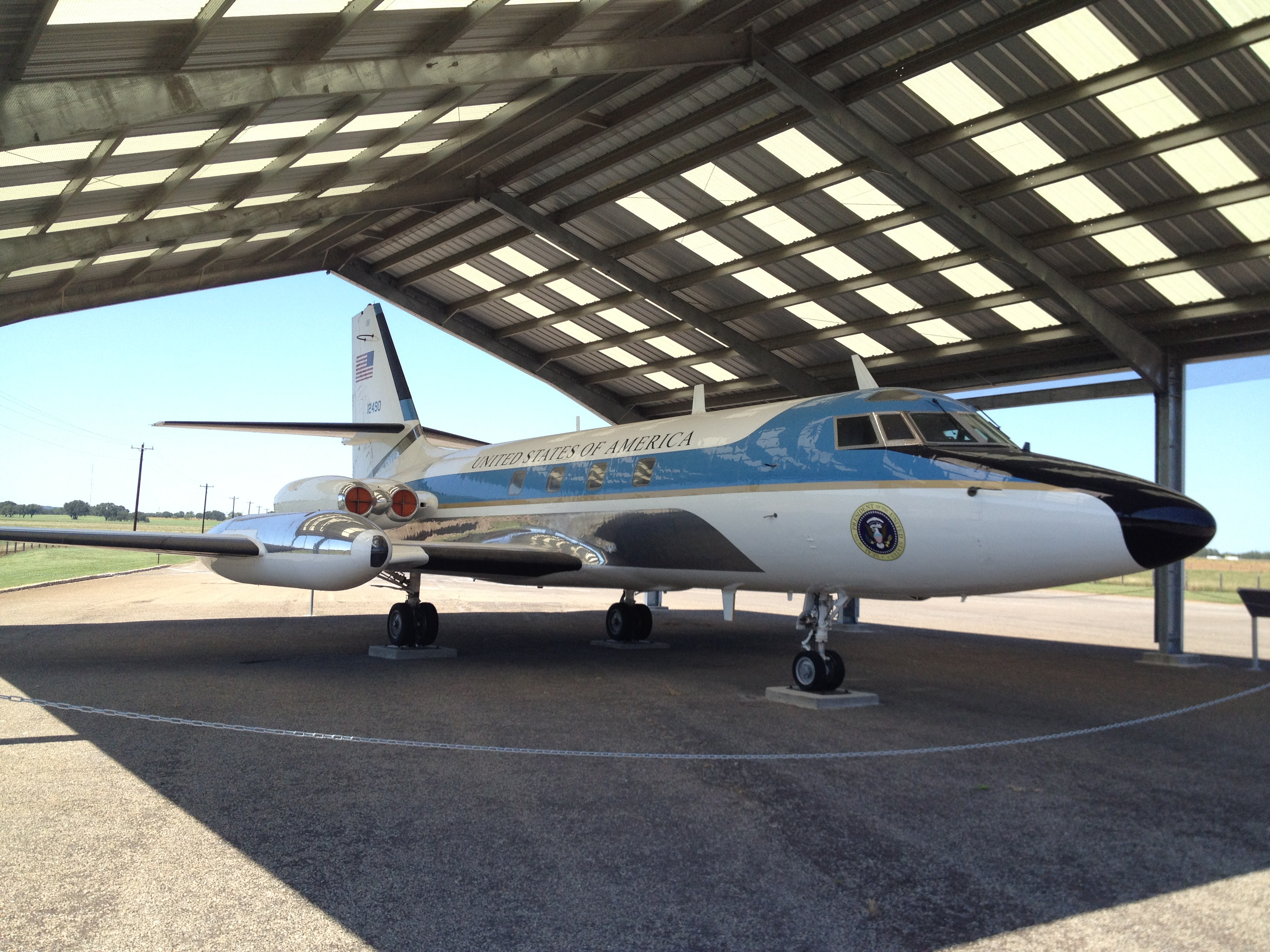
Lockheed VC-140B used by President Johnson on display at the Lyndon B. Johnson National Historical Park

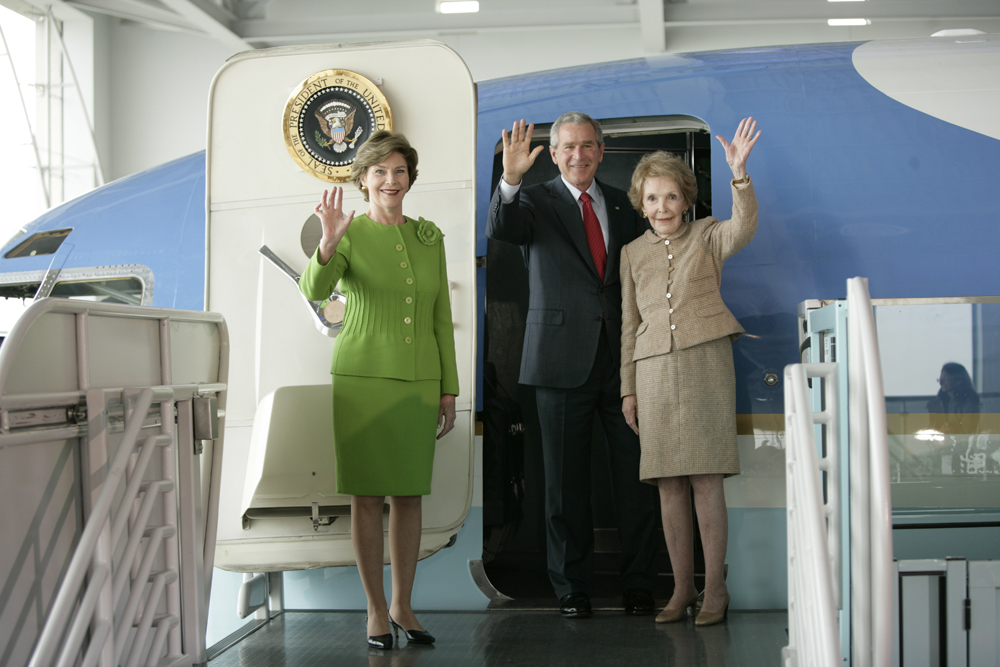
President George W. Bush, First Lady Laura Bush, and former first lady Nancy Reagan toured SAM 27000, housed at the Ronald Reagan Presidential Library, in October 2005.

A Lockheed VC-140B Jetstar used by Lyndon Johnson during his presidency is on display at the LBJ Ranch (now the Lyndon B. Johnson National Historical Park) in Stonewall, Texas. The ranch's runway was too small to accommodate the Boeing 707, so President Johnson flew it to Bergstrom AFB in Austin, then transferred to the smaller JetStar for the short flight to the ranch. Another VC-140B used during the Johnson presidency is on display at the Hill Aerospace Museum which uncovered presidential markings on the plane while stripping the paint for restoration.

A McDonnell Douglas VC-9C used by Ronald Reagan and Bill Clinton is on display at Castle Air Museum in Atwater, California, next to the former Castle Air Force Base. Another VC-9C has been at Air Mobility Command Museum in Dover, Delaware, since 2011.

VC-137B SAM 970, used from 1959 to 1962 as Air Force One and until 1996 in the presidential fleet, is on display at The Museum of Flight in Seattle, Washington.

== In popular culture ==
A fictionalized version of Air Force One is depicted in the 1997 feature film Air Force One. The cabin was built to scale and is as accurate as the production designers could possibly make it. "There weren't any blueprints or floor plans available, so we had to watch CNN to see what the inside looked like," said the film's director Wolfgang Petersen.

== See also ==
- 1254th Air Transport Wing
- 89th Airlift Wing – US Air Force unit transporting senior officials
- Air transports of heads of state and government
- Army One – Air traffic control call sign
- Marine One – US presidential air traffic call sign
- Navy One – US Navy aircraft carrying the US president
- Presidential state car (United States) – Vehicle used by the president of the US
