= Blake Scholl =

Cofounder of Boom Technology (born c.1981)

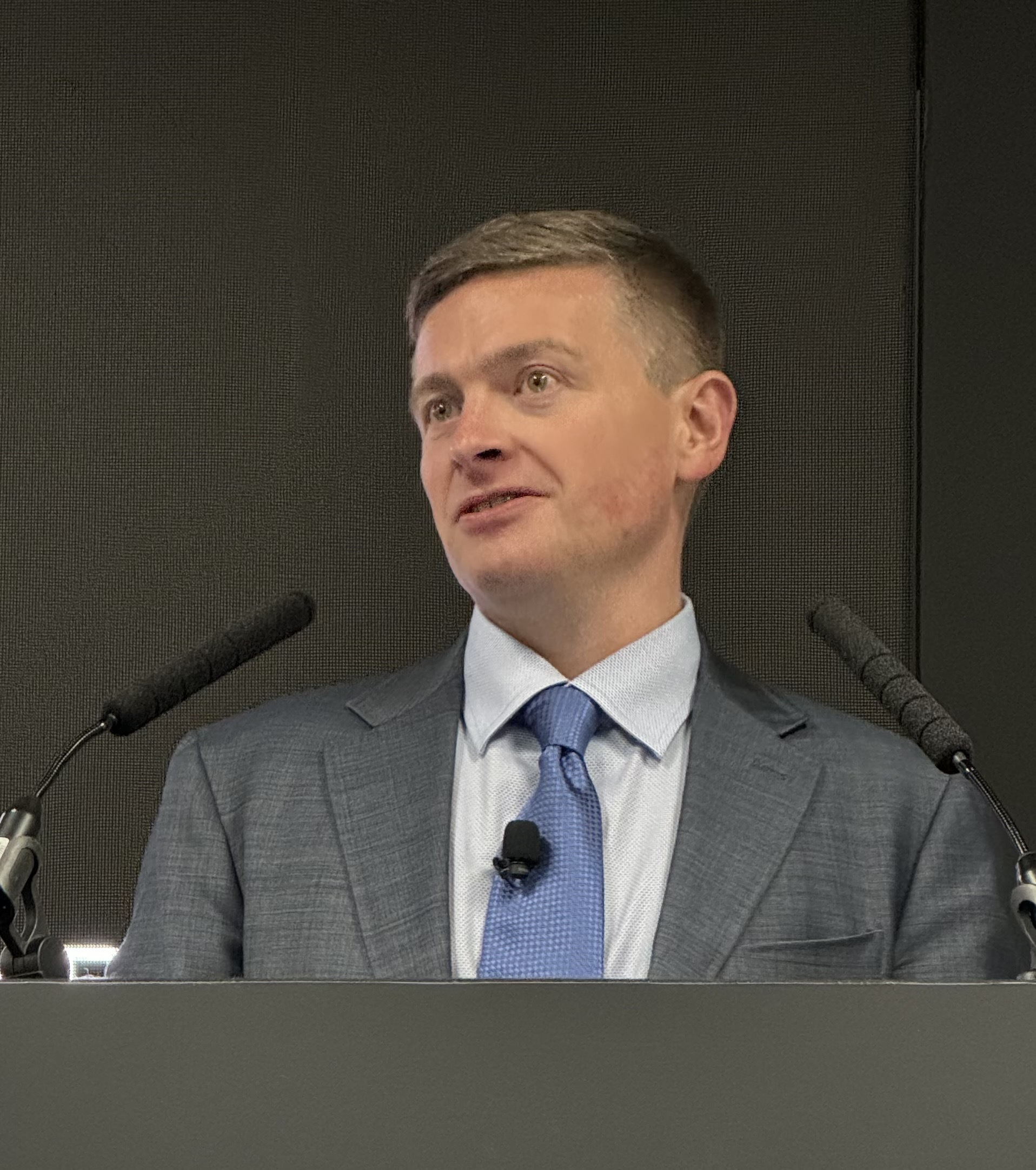
- Scholl in July 2024
- Born: 1981 (age 45); Cincinnati, Ohio, U.S.
- Education: Carnegie Mellon University
- Occupation: businessman
- Title: Founder and CEO, Boom Technology

Nathaniel Blake Scholl (born c. 1981) is an American tech entrepreneur. In 2014, he founded Boom Technology to develop a supersonic airliner.

== Early life ==
Scholl was born in Cincinnati, Ohio to an electrical engineer father with German origins, and a French teacher mother. A high school dropout, he won a scholarship for early entry into Carnegie Mellon University, where he majored in computer science.

== Career ==
Scholl worked for Jeff Bezos in the "early days" of Amazon. He then cofounded Kima Labs, a mobile technology startup that was acquired by Groupon in 2012. In early 2014, Scholl took aircraft design classes, built an aerodynamics model, and sought feedback from a Stanford professor, who reviewed his calculations and encouraged him to aim higher, saying his estimates in his spreadsheet model for supersonic flight were conservative. Scholl invested half of his share of the proceeds from the sale into his next venture, Boom Technology, which he founded later that year. He has been the CEO of the company since October 2019. The company's aircraft Boom XB-1 performed its first supersonic flight test in 2025.

== Personal life ==
Scholl obtained his private pilot license in 2007. He has four children.
