= StandardAero =

American maintenance, repair and overhaul (MRO) company

StandardAero, Inc.
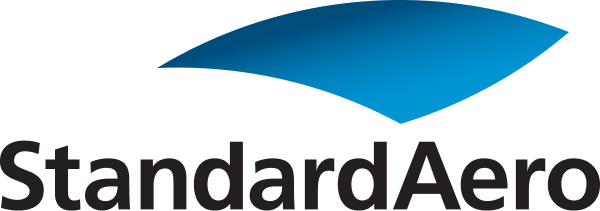
- Type: Public
- Traded as: NYSE: SARO; S&P 400 component
- Industry: Aerospace; Defense
- Founded: 1911; 115 years ago in Winnipeg, Manitoba, Canada
- Headquarters: Scottsdale, Arizona, U.S.
- Services: CFM56, CF34, LM1600, 54H60 Propellers, CFE738, HTF7000, TFE731, TPE331, F100-220, PT6, PW100, PW200, PW610, AE 1107, AE 2100, AE3007, M250, RR300, T56/501D/501K, Airframes, Avionics, Component Repair
- Revenue: US$4.5 billion
- Number of employees: +8,100
- Divisions: Business Aviation; Commercial and General Aviation; Government and Military; Helicopter Programs; Component Repair Services; Industrial Power
- Website: standardaero.com

StandardAero, Inc. is an American maintenance, repair and overhaul (MRO) provider based in Scottsdale, Arizona.

== History ==
=== 1900s ===
The predecessor to StandardAero was formed in 1911 in the city of Winnipeg, Manitoba, Canada, as Standard Machine Works. The company was founded by William S. Bickell and Charles F. Pearce as a small automotive engine repair shop.

StandardAero was formed in 1937 as an offshoot of Standard Machine Works and become fully independent in 1940. Standard Machine Works still operates as a separate entity in the west-end neighbourhood of Winnipeg, Manitoba.

In 1953, StandardAero had sales of $1 million and 105 employees.

The Federal Grain Company of Winnipeg reached an agreement to purchase the shares of Standard Aero Engine Limited for more than $2 million in September 1968. Then Federal Grain Chairman A.S.Leach said the agreement "was the result of Federal Grain's program to diversity and broaden its economic base…" StandardAero employed about 460 people at the time.

Federal Grain sold its grain assets in 1972 and its remaining assets, including StandardAero, were held by its successor Federal Industries Limited. By 1973, under Federal Industries, sales were $19 million and the company had 600 employees. In 1974, the company overhauled piston engines for aeroplanes and turboshaft engines for helicopters. The company had expressed an interest in expanding its services to include jet engines.

StandardAero was sold by Federal Industries to the Montreal-based firm Avcorp for $124 million in 1987. In May 1987, Avcorp sold StandardAero's general aviation distributing business for $20 million to Aviall. Aviall is now owned by Boeing.

StandardAero was sold again two years later in 1989 to the British firm Hawker Siddeley Group plc for $103 million.

Hawker Siddeley Group plc broke up in 1992 and various parts of the former company, including StandardAero, were acquired by BTR Industries.

Doughty Hanson & Co purchased BTR Aerospace Group in 1998 and formed a new company known as Dunlop Standard Aerospace Group.

=== 2000–2010 ===
In partnership with Meggitt PLC, global private equity firm The Carlyle Group purchased Dunlop Standard Aerospace Group for approximately $1.4 billion in 2004. Meggitt PLC retained the Dunlop Aerospace Design and Manufacturing division while The Carlyle Group acquired StandardAero. StandardAero was purchased for approximately $670 million.

Dubai Aerospace Enterprise (DAE) acquired StandardAero and Landmark Aviation from The Carlyle Group in 2007 for $1.9 billion. Paul Soubry, the current CEO of New Flyer Industries, was appointed as president and chief executive officer of the combined company. Paul Soubry reported directly to Robert Mionis, CEO of DAE Engineering. DAE moved the head office of StandardAero to the Phoenix area shortly after the sale.

StandardAero, under DAE Engineering, purchased TSS aviation based in Cincinnati, Ohio, in 2007 for $65 million. TSS aviation was established in 1948 and operated as a component overhaul facility for aerospace and industrial gas turbine engines at the time of its purchase.

StandardAero and Landmark were integrated into a single company under the corporate identity of StandardAero in March 2008. The combined company had more than 4000 employees and $1.4 billion per year in sales. Robert Mionis assumed the position of president and CEO of StandardAero, in addition to his role as CEO of DAE Engineering, from Paul Soubry.

=== 2010–2020 ===
StandardAero maintains and operates GE Aviation's $50 million aircraft engine testing, research and development centre (TRDC) at the James A. Richardson International Airport in Winnipeg, Manitoba. The facility opened in February 2012 and is used to test gas turbine engines up to 150 inches in diameter and up to 150,000 lbs of thrust.

Rob Mionis resigned from StandardAero in March 2013 and was replaced by Interim President and CEO Firoz Tarapore. Russell Ford, the current CEO of StandardAero, was appointed in September 2013.

New York-based Veritas Capital Fund Management, L.L.C. purchased StandardAero from DAE in 2015 for $2.1 billion. StandardAero had 1,200 employees at its largest site in Winnipeg, Manitoba and 3,400 employees world-wide.

StandardAero acquired PAS Technologies in 2017 with the details of the deal not being disclosed. PAS Technologies provides MRO and OEM services in the aerospace, oil and gas, and industrial gas turbine markets, and employed approximately 500 people with annual revenues exceeding $100 million.

StandardAero announced that it would close Associated Air Center in September 2017. StandardAero attempted to sell the business but was unsuccessful.

StandardAero Aviation Holdings acquired Vector Aerospace Holdings from Airbus in November 2017. Vector was an aerospace MRO company with 2200 employees and revenue of over $700 million in 2016. The combined company has over 6000 employees and annual revenues of over $3 billion.

On December 18, 2018, the aircraft maintenance provider was purchased by asset management company The Carlyle Group from Veritas Capital for $5 billion, the deal was closed on April 5, 2019.

=== Since 2020 ===
Sikorsky selected StandardAero to final assembly S-70 (H-60 Blackhawks) in England, if they are the winner of the U.K.'s New Medium Helicopter project.

Boom Supersonic selected StandardAero to build the engine dubbed Symphony for its upcoming jet named Overture.

In October 2024, StandardAero became a public company via an initial public offering, and was listed on the New York Stock Exchange.

In June 2026, StandardAero announced the appointment of Paul McElhinney as its new CEO from October 1, 2026, replacing Russell Ford who has held the role since 2013.

== See also ==
- Doug Finley, former president of StandardAero and Canadian former Senator
- Paul Soubry, former president and CEO of StandardAero and current CEO of New Flyer Industries
