= Mach cutoff =

Phenomenon of supersonic flight

Mach cutoff is a phenomenon of high-altitude supersonic flight in which the sonic boom generated at speeds not too far above Mach 1 never reaches the ground.

== Details ==
Flight is supersonic when the aircraft speed exceeds the speed of sound in the immediately surrounding air. A side-effect is the creation of a sonic shock-wave, heard on the ground in the vicinity as a loud and disturbing bang, known as a sonic boom. For this reason supersonic flight is generally limited to travel over oceans and large seas, and to high altitude.

But there is a temperature gradient between the ground (generally a few degrees Celsius) and flight altitude (generally several tens of degrees below zero). This causes the sound waves travelling downwards to refract towards the horizontal. Accordingly, so long as the flight path is high enough and aircraft speed is not too far above Mach 1, this refraction causes the sonic boom instead to be heard as subsonic sound; it is called Mach cutoff.

Calculating this varies for any flight, as the required refraction depends on temperature gradient, air pressure gradient and differing wind speeds in the air column.

== See also ==
- Boom Technology
- Refraction (sound)
