= Boom Technology =

American startup supersonic aircraft company

Boom Technology, Inc.
- Type: Private
- Industry: Aerospace industry
- Founded: September 26, 2014; 12 years ago Denver, Colorado, U.S.
- Founders: Blake Scholl; Joe Wilding; Josh Krall
- Headquarters: Centennial, Colorado
- Key people: Blake Scholl (CEO)
- Products: Supersonic aircraft
- Number of employees: 150
- Website: boomsupersonic.com

Boom Technology, Inc. (trade name Boom Supersonic) is an American company developing the Overture, a proposed supersonic airliner. It has also flight tested the Boom XB-1, which broke the sound barrier for the first time on January 28, 2025, during a flight from the Mojave Air and Space Port.

== History ==
The company was founded in Denver in 2014. It participated in a Y Combinator startup incubation program in early 2016, and has been funded by Y Combinator, Sam Altman, Paul Graham, Alex Gerko, Michael Moritz, Bessemer Venture Partners, Seraph Group, and others.

In March 2017, $33 million was invested by several venture funds: Continuity Fund, RRE Ventures, Palm Drive Ventures, 8VC and Caffeinated Capital. Boom secured $43 million of total financing by April 2017. In 2017, Japan Airlines invested $10 million, as part of a Series B fundraising round that brought the company capital to $156 million by 2020: enough to build the XB-1 demonstrator and complete its testing, and to start early design work on the 60-80-seat airliner. As of 2025, the company has raised over $600 million in investor funding.

In January 2022, the company announced plans to build a 400,000-square-foot (37,000 m^{2}) manufacturing facility on a 65-acre (260,000 m^{2}) site at Piedmont Triad International Airport in Greensboro, North Carolina. Construction on the facility, named the Overture Superfactory, was completed in June 2024.

In November 2023, a representative of the NEOM Investment Fund announced their investment in Boom at an undisclosed amount. This follows an announcement by Boom of a "strategic investment" in the company from the fund.

If completed, the 60- to 80-seat aircraft, Overture, would be the first supersonic passenger jet since the Anglo-French Concorde which was retired in 2003.

== Projects ==
=== XB-1 demonstrator ===
The Boom XB-1 is a supersonic demonstrator, designed to fly up to Mach 1.3, and powered by three General Electric J85-15 engines with a total of 12,900 pounds-force [lbf] (57 kN) of thrust. It was rolled out in October 2020. It was expected to be flight tested in 2022, but delays pushed the first flight test to March 22, 2024. During the first test flight, the aircraft reached speeds of up to 264 knots (489 km/h; 304 mph) and achieved an altitude of over 7,000 feet (2,100 m). In the ninth test flight on 13 December 2024, the aircraft reached speeds of up to Mach 0.87 or 517 knots (957 km/h; 595 mph) and achieved an altitude of over 27,000 feet (8,200 m).

During the twelfth test flight on 28 January 2025, the aircraft broke the sound barrier three times, reaching speeds up to Mach 1.122, or approximately 650 knots (1,200 km/h; 750 mph) and achieved an altitude of over 35,000 feet (11,000 m). The aircraft became the first privately funded aircraft to break the sound barrier, reaching a speed of Mach 1.122. The company said XB-1 achieved supersonic flight without generating an audible sonic boom that reached the ground after refining its sonic boom models and improving algorithms for predicting Mach cutoff conditions. XB-1's final flight on 10 February 2025 consisted of three more supersonic runs, reaching a top speed of Mach 1.18, or 671 knots (1,243 km/h; 772 mph) and an altitude of over 36,000 feet (11,000 m). During this flight, Boom partnered with NASA to capture a Schlieren image showing the shock waves resulting from XB-1 pushing through the air at supersonic speeds.

=== Overture airliner ===
The Boom Overture is a proposed supersonic transport designed to achieve an airspeed of Mach 1.7 (1,000 kn; 1,800 km/h; 1,100 mph), accommodate 60 to 80 passengers and a planned range of 4,250 nmi (7,870 km; 4,890 mi). Boom said there could be a market for over 1,000 supersonic airliners, and suggests airlines could charge business or first class fares. It decided to use the delta wing configuration of Concorde and make use of composite materials. It is to be powered by four 40,000 pounds-force [lbf] (180 kN) medium bypass turbofan engines.

In January 2021, Boom announced plans to begin Overture test flights in 2027 and Boom CEO Blake Scholl "estimates that flights on Overture will be available in 2030."

United Airlines announced in June 2021 that it had signed a deal to purchase 15 Boom Overture aircraft, with an option to buy 35 more. American Airlines announced in August 2022 it had agreed to purchase 20 Boom Overture aircraft. Boom’s orders and pre-orders total 130 aircraft from airlines including United Airlines, American Airlines, and Japan Airlines.

=== Symphony engine ===
In December 2022, Boom announced the Symphony, a new propulsion system to be designed for the Overture. Boom will work with three companies to develop Symphony: Florida Turbine Technologies for engine design, Colibrium Additive for additive technology design consulting, and StandardAero for maintenance. In April 2025, Boom acquired a former Reaction Engines hypersonic test facility at Colorado Air and Space Port, to serve as the dedicated test site for the Symphony engine.

=== Mach 4 airliner concept ===
Boom Supersonic participated in a NASA-led study to develop concept designs and technology roadmaps for a Mach 4 airliner. Boom was part of a team led by Northrop Grumman Aeronautics Systems, alongside Blue Ridge Research and Consulting and Rolls-Royce North American Technologies.

=== Superpower natural gas turbine ===
Introduced in December 2025, Superpower is a 42-megawatt (MW) natural gas turbine based on the Symphony engine utilized in the Overture supersonic airliner. This turbine is designed to power AI data centers. It is also intended to generate revenue for Boom while collecting operational data for the Symphony engine. The Superpower maintains a consistent output of 42 MW even at temperatures of up to 110°F (43°C) without derating. It operates without cooling water, fits within an ISO-container-sized enclosure, and shares 80% of its components with the Symphony. Crusoe Energy, an AI infrastructure company collaborating with OpenAI on initiatives such as the Stargate data center, placed an order for 29 units, totaling 1.21 GW, as part of a $1.25 billion backlog.

However, in September 2026, Crusoe abandoned the $1.25 billion order. Boom CEO Blake Scholl initially stated in a subsequently deleted post that turbines were no longer part of Crusoe's near-term primary power mix for its facilities. A spokesperson for Crusoe later clarified that the company's energy plans remained unchanged and that they still planned to use turbines for their data centers, "just not Boom's".

== See also ==
- Supersonic business jet
- Aerion
- Exosonic
- Spike S-512
