= List of aviation strikes =

Labour disputes in the aviation industry

A number of notable strikes and labour disputes related to aviation have occurred since the 20th century.

== 20th century ==
=== 1930s ===
Strike	Date	Country	Organisations	Type of worker	Unions	Main issues	Notes	References
Century Airlines pilots' strike	1932	United States	Century Air Lines	Pilots	ALPA	Wages		

=== 1940s ===
Strike	Date	Country	Organisations	Type of worker	Unions	Main issues	Notes	References
Royal Air Force strikes of 1946	1946	British Raj	Royal Indian Air Force					
1946 TWA strike	1946	United States	Trans World Airlines	Pilots				
1948 Boeing strike	1948	United States	Boeing	Machinists	IAM	Seniority benefits, wages		

=== 1950s ===
Strike	Date	Country	Organisations	Type of worker	Unions	Main issues	Notes	References
1958–59 Eastern Air Lines strike	1958–1959	United States	Eastern Air Lines	Flight engineers, mechanics		Regulations that flight engineers obtain pilots' licences, wages		

=== 1960s ===
Strike	Date	Country	Organisations	Type of worker	Unions	Main issues	Notes	References
1960–62 Southern Airways strike	1960-1962	United States	Southern Airways	Pilots	ALPA	Wages		
1961 United States flight engineers strike	1961	United States	Multiple	Flight engineers		Regulations that flight engineers obtain pilots' licences		
1966 Qantas strike	1966	Australia	Qantas	Pilots	AFAP	Aviation safety		
1966 United States airline strike	1966	United States	Multiple		IAM			
1967–69 BOAC strikes	1967-1969	United Kingdom	BOAC	Pilots				

=== 1970s ===
Strike	Date	Country	Organisations	Type of worker	Unions	Main issues	Notes	References
1971 Lufthansa strike	1971	West Germany	Lufthansa				First strike in Lufthansa history	

=== 1980s ===
Strike	Date	Country	Organisations	Type of worker	Unions	Main issues	Notes	References
1980 Singapore Airlines Pilots Association strike	1980	Singapore	Singapore Airlines	Pilots	SIPA			
1981 Professional Air Traffic Controllers Organization strike	1981	United States		Air traffic controllers	PATCO	Working conditions		
1981–82 El Al strikes	1981-1982	Israel	El Al	Multiple				
1983–85 Continental Airlines strikes	1983–1985	United States	Continental Airlines	Mechanics, pilots, flight attendants	IAM, ALPA, AFA	Wages, benefits, union busting		
1985 Pan Am strike	1985	United States	Pan Am	Mechanics	TWU			
1985 United Airlines strike	1985	United States	United Airlines	Pilots, flight attendants	ALPA, AFA	Two-tier system for wages, strikebreaking		
1989 Eastern Air Lines strike	1989	United States	Eastern Air Lines	Multiple	IAM, ALPA, AFA	Wages, benefits, union busting		
1989 Australian pilots' dispute	1989	Australia	Multiple	Pilots	AFAP	Wages		
1989 Boeing strike	1989	United States	Boeing	Machinists	IAM	Wages		

=== 1990s ===
Strike	Date	Country	Organisations	Type of worker	Unions	Main issues	Notes	References
1993 Air France strike	1993	France	Air France					
1993 Cathay Pacific strike	1993	British Hong Kong	Cathay Pacific	Flight attendants		Staffing levels		
1993 American Airlines strike	1993	United States	American Airlines	Flight attendants	AFA			
1998 Air Canada strike	1998	Canada	Air Canada	Pilots				

== 21st century ==
=== 2000s ===
Strike	Date	Country	Organisations	Type of worker	Unions	Main issues	Notes	References
2005 Asiana Airlines strike	2005	South Korea	Asiana Airlines	Pilots		Scheduling, retirement age, management		
2005 Gate Gourmet dispute	2005	United Kingdom	Gategroup	Caterers	TGWU	Use of non-unionised workers		
2006–2007 Brazilian aviation crisis	2006–2007	Brazil		Air traffic controllers		Aviation safety		
2008 Boeing machinists' strike	2008	United States	Boeing	Machinists	IAM	Outsourcing, job security, wages		
2009 New Caledonia unrest	2009	New Caledonia	Air Calédonie		USTKE			

=== 2010s ===
Strike	Date	Country	Organisations	Type of worker	Unions	Main issues	Notes	References
Spanish air traffic controllers' strike	2010	Spain		Air traffic controllers		Working conditions, work schedules, benefits	First declaration of a state of alert under military law by the Spanish government since the 1975 restoration of democracy	
2011 Qantas industrial disputes	2011	Australia	Qantas	Engineers, pilots, baggage handlers				
2012 Air India strike	2012	India	Air India	Pilots		Boeing 787 Dreamliner training, merger with Indian Airlines		
2014 Air France strike	2014	France	Air France	Pilots				
2016 China Airlines flight attendants' strike	2016	Taiwan	China Airlines	Flight attendants	TFAU		First flight attendants' strike in Taiwan history	

=== 2020s ===
Strike	Date	Country	Organisations	Type of worker	Unions	Main issues	Notes	References
2020–2021 Rolls-Royce Barnoldswick strikes	2020-2021	United Kingdom	Rolls-Royce Holdings	Machinists		Offshoring		
2024 Boeing machinists' strike	2024	United States	Boeing	Machinists	IAM	Wages		
2024 Bombardier strike	2024	Canada	Bombardier Inc.	Machinists	Unifor	Wages, benefits		
2025 Air Canada flight attendants strike	2025	Canada	Air Canada	Flight attendants	CUPE	Wages, compensation for unpaid work		
2025 Boeing machinists' strike	2025	United States	Boeing	Machinists	IAM	Wages		
2025 FlySafair strike	2025	South Africa	FlySafair	Pilots	Solidarity	Wages, rostering		
