= 1983–85 Continental Airlines strikes =

- Flight attendants on strike
- Date: August 13, 1983 – October 31, 1985
- Location: United States

Parties
Continental Airlines	International Association of Machinists and Aerospace Workers; Air Line Pilots Association, International; Association of Flight Attendants

Lead figures
Frank Lorenzo	

The 1983–85 Continental Airlines strikes were a series of strikes by Continental Airlines workers in the United States. Beginning in August 1983, Continental mechanics went on strike in protest over plans by Continental's new president Frank Lorenzo to slash wages and benefits. In September 1983, Continental filed for bankruptcy, firing most of its employees and voiding its collective bargaining agreements. In October 1983, the airline's pilots and flight attendants launched strikes of their own against Lorenzo's leadership. The strikes would last for over two years, during which Continental made extensive use of strikebreaking to maintain its operations and used the bankruptcy declaration to lead a significant re-organisation of its operations. In the spring of 1985, the mechanics and flight attendants called off their strike. The pilots would follow suit in October 1985. The strike was widely perceived as a victory for Continental's management and a significant defeat for the unions, although the management's tactics were controversial. David J. Walsh of Miami University has described the strike as "undeniably a low point for airline labor." The strike was one of the largest in the history of the aviation industry in the United States.

== Background ==
A Continental Airlines McDonnell Douglas DC-10 in 1984

In 1983, Continental Airlines was one of the major airlines in the United States. The airline was controlled by executive Frank Lorenzo, who had taken control of Continental in 1981. Lorenzo's takeover of Continental had been a hostile takeover, with the airline's previous management and employees attempting to enact an Employee Stock Ownership Plan (ESOP) to prevent the takeover, but failing when courts ruled that any ESOP needed shareholder approval. After the ESOP failed, Continental's president, Alvin Feldman, committed suicide. In 1982, Lorenzo merged Continental with his Texas International Airlines, and in early 1983, moved Continental's headquarters to the former Texas International headquarters in Houston, Texas. In the first two years of Lorenzo's leaderships, Continental workers agreed to a range of salary and benefits cuts, saving the company tens of millions of dollars in expenses annually. However, the company reported a loss of over $160 million in the first three fiscal quarters of 1983.

In 1978, the Airline Deregulation Act came into force in the United States, removing a wide range of federal government controls over the airline industry in the country, including over farse, routes, and the creation of new airlines. Deregulation led to significantly increased competition between airlines, with the industry further being disturbed by the early 1980s recession and the 1981 Professional Air Traffic Controllers Organization strike. These factors in turn led to a surge in labour disputes between airline managements and workers, as managements moved aggressively to rollback wages and benefits and to lower costs. However, according to Walsh, "in general, airline unions did not fare well in strikes during the 1980s. In contrast to the period before deregulation, carriers usually attempted to operate during strikes and sometimes actively provoked them. Permanent replacements were frequently threatened and sometimes used. A key factor affecting the outcomes of strikes was the degree of interunion support available."

Under American law, labour relations in the airline industry were regulated by the Railway Labor Act. The Act, first enacted in the 1920s, emphasised bargaining and arbitration in labour disputes, while minimising strike action, with the goal of preventing disruption to nationally-important transportation. Notably, the Act enforced a bargaining process between unions and management followed 30-day cooling-off period following the failure of the process, during which unions were not allowed to begin strike action. As well, unions could only strike over disputes deemed to be major disputes, there were less restrictions on unions' ability to take secondary boycotts, and management was less restricted on unfair labor practice (including being allowed to permanently hire strikebreakers).

== Events ==
=== Mechanics launch strike ===
On 13 August 1983, Continental mechanics walked off the job, launching strike action. Jim Conley, a union spokesperson, told the press that it was "obvious the company wanted a strike. They started pulling things from the table and made things worse than they already were." John Peterpaul, another union official, pledged that the mechanics "will not be intimidated by the strong-arm method employed by Continental."

The mechanics' strike got off to a rocky start. Many of the former Texas International Airlines mechanics refused to join the strike, and Continental was able to use supervisory staff to replace those that did go on strike, allowing the airline's management to keep staffing levels relatively high. As well, both the airline's pilots and flight attendants unions refused to launch sympathy strikes.

Continental was able to maintain regular 85% of its usual flight schedules. After the first couple days of the strike, Continental management announced that it would hiring permanent replacements for the striking mechanics.

=== Bankruptcy declaration ===
In mid September, Continental management sent a memo to the airline's pilots and flight attendants demanding additional tens of millions of dollars of additional pay and benefit cuts, saying that cuts were necessary to keep the airline alive. According to George Hopkins of Western Illinois University, the memo was "apocalyptic." The unions refused to accept the cuts. Lorenzo then issued an ultimatum to the pilots and flights attendants to accept the cuts, or else he would declare bankruptcy to enforce the cuts. The unions and management subsequently underwent several days of intense negotiations, with the unions indicating that they would be willing to accept cuts as long as they were carried out under the framework of the existing collective bargaining agreements and management saying that the full cuts were too urgently needed for drawn-out negotiations. As the expiry of Lorenzo's ultimatum drew near, top Continental executive Stephen Wolf suddenly quit, privately telling the unions that "I won’t be part of this."

On 24 September 1983, the airline filed for bankruptcy under Chapter 11, Title 11, United States Code. In its bankruptcy filing, the airline included only its domestic services, separating its international flights into a subsidiary, and claimed debts of $650 million against assests of $800 million. In the filing, the airline also claimed that that previous collective bargaining agreements had forced the company into substantial overstaffing and that "high labor costs were a critical part of the difference between very substantial losses and reasonable profits." The filing marked the first time in the United States aviation industry that an airline used Chapter 11 in an attempt to force labour concessions.

After filing for bankruptcy, the airline announced a re-organisation plan to turn the airline into a low-cost carrier serving a smaller number of routes. As part of the re-organisation plan, the airline temporarily suspended all domestic flights and immediately fired around two-thirds of its workforce. Remaining workers saw their salaries and benefits immediately cut to almost half of their pre-bankruptcy levels and their work hours increased by around 50%. Lorenzo pledged that "a carrier operating from superb facilities and with a long tradition of fine service will be able to achieve a unique niche in the nation's air transportation systems."

The declaration of bankruptcy was controversial. Many Continental workers and union officials perceived it as an attempt at union busting. ALPA negotiator Dennis Higgins accused the airline's management of "doing nothing more than trying to void their contracts." Lawrence Peter King of the New York University School of Law warned that previous court cases had found that using Chapter 11 to reject collective bargaining "represents misuse of the bankruptcy process."

On 27 September, the airline resumed domestic flights to 25 of the 78 cities it had previously served, offering tickets at discounted prices. The pilots and flight attendants union's initially told their members to work as usual as the airline resumed domestic flights.

=== Pilots and flights attendants join strike ===
In the days following the bankruptcy declaration, Continental pilots and flight attendants quickly debated launching a strike of their own against the company's management. On 29 September, they voted in favour of striking. ALPA president Henry Duffy argued that a strike was necessary to prevent Lorenzo's practices from being emulated by other airlines, calling for government intervention into the state of the airline industry and saying that a strike was "a course of last resort. We think safety will be irreparably harmed as airlines continue to fail. We are frustrated. We have not been listened to." The airline's management, on the other hand, stated that it was prepared for a strike, saying that it had secured pledges from hundreds of pilots to cross any picket line.

On 1 October 1983, Continental pilots and flight attendants began walking off the job, launching strike action. However, like the mechanics strike, this strike also began sub-optimally, with a number of pilots crossing the picket line. Continental spokesperson Stephanie Roth told the press on the first day of the strike that "We couldn't be more pleased with the way things are going today. We are flying Continental pilots. Every pilot who is showing up is a union pilot," while Lorenzo stated that "What the pilots union is doing right now does not have the support of the rank and file nor does it have the support of the flying public." Judge Randolph Wheless Jr. also placed a temporarily injunction until the end of October to ensure that Continental's suppliers kept providing the airline with materials as it began bankruptcy reorganisation.

On the 10th day of the pilots strike, the airline began interviewing candidates in 11 different cities to cross the picket line and replace the striking pilots. Walsh has noted that "The strikes occurred during a period of high unemployment, including a glut of qualified pilots."

After two months, over 300 striking pilots had decided to break the strike and return to work. Stan Marshall, a pilot who crossed the picket line, wrote in the United Press International that he believed that the decision to strike "was based on too much emotion, was hastily decided, and I don't believe it was the way to handle the differences between management and labor," and that the airline's "survival in a deregulated environment depends on the current reorganization." Lorenzo personally phoned many of the strikebreakers to convince them to cross the picket line.

=== Legal battles ===
On 11 October 1983, the three unions (the IAM, ALPA, and AFA) filed a petition to Wheless Jr. calling for the court to dismiss Continental's bankruptcy filing. The unions argued that the company's management had filed in bad faith, claiming that the company was not in enough financial difficulty and that it primarily wanted to bust the unions.

Testifying in mid-December 1983, Lorenzo claimed that "I did not want a strike" but that Continental had no alternative but to decrease labour costs, adding that "it would have been irresponsible to just simply let the entity run out of cash totally and completely." The company was represented by the Weil, Gotshal & Manges law firm.

The lawyer representing a committee of Continental creditors argued against the unions' petition, accusing the unions of "suggesting the mere existence of collective bargaining agreements prevents [Continental] from utilizing the bankruptcy code. I think that's extraordinary. [The unions] are trying to rewrite the bankruptcy act. It's so far-reaching it borders on being absurd."

On 17 January 1984, Wheless Jr. ruled in favour of the airline. In his ruling Wheless Jr. judged that the unions "have not satisfactorily demonstrated that there was any reasonable alternative under which the airline could keep operating," and that the airline's primary purpose in filing for bankruptcy was to "to best utilize its going concern value," which it owed to its shareholders and creditors.

Continental management subsequently filed a court petition asking to void its collective bargaining agreements under Chapter 11 bankruptcy. In June 1984, Wheless Jr. ruled in favour of the airline. In his ruling, Wheless Jr. judged that the pilots' contract was "burdensome to the estate" and that the inability of the two sides to reach an agreement "threatens to impede the success of the debtor's reorganization."

=== Further months on strike ===
By the tenth month of the strike, Continental expanded its flight schedule to above its pre-strike capacity. In mid-1984, Continental reported that that it had earned a $10.4 million profit in the second quarter of 1984, the company's first reported quarterly profit since the bankruptcy filing. This compared to a $26.5 million loss in the second quarter of 1983. Lorenzo attributed the profit to the bankruptcy, saying that "we restructured our costs and passed on those cost savings through low, simple fares with full service and it is a winning combination."

In late December 1984, Agis Salpukas of The New York Times wrote that Lorenzo "has accomplished a feat that is eluding many major airlines: cutting costs fast enough to compete with newer, upstart airlines that have flourished since deregulation," noting that "Continental has built its service back up very quickly. It now serves 70 cities, only 8 fewer than before the bankruptcy, and has expanded its work force back to 10,000, compared with 12,000 pre-bankruptcy."

In early February 1985, Continental reported that it had earned a $50.3 million in 1984, describing it as the most profitable year in the airline's history.

The strike was acrimonious. Agis Salpukas of The New York Times reported that "Tires have been slashed and cars damaged, and punches have been thrown during picket line crossings. Two striking pilots have been convicted on charges of conspiracy to plant pipe bombs in the homes of working pilots in San Antonio. The pilots received sentences of eight years each. They are out on bail while their case is appealed. There were also constant charges by A.L.P.A. leaders and strikers that the airline was unsafe. These tactics have alienated many working pilots." The Christian Science Monitor quoted pilot Jerry Shafer as saying "what good does it do if you want to earn a living when the purpose of the strike has apparently failed? When I perceived the goal of the strike was to shut down Continental permanently... I wasn't ready for that," and pilot John Gaylord as saying that "You're completely programmed against someone, to hate, hate, hate... It was all chest-pounding. I was sick of the chest-pounding."

In August 1985, a group of former Continental pilots, including some on strike and led by Paul R. Eckel (who had been involved in failed ESOP in 1981), formed Pride Air, an employee-owned low-cost carrier based out of New Orleans International Airport. Pride Air, however, ceased operations due to financial difficulties after only three months.

=== End of mechanics' and flight attendants' strikes ===
By the spring of 1985, over half of the airline's mechanics and flight attendants had broken the strike and returned to work. Those unions consequently made the choice to end their strike. IAM representative Alex Bay told the press that "It was time for us to evaluate our strategy. The strike wasn’t getting the job done," adding that "We feel that while on strike, the unions have been perceived as having an intention of destroying the company. That has never been our goal. That has never been our intent. We hope that by discontinuing the strike, we can get rid of that perception."

The pilots, however, continued their strike.

=== End of pilots' strike ===
In mid-June 1985, the Federal Aviation Administration announced that it had completed a review into ALPA allegations over Continental's flight safety during the strikes. William J. Ayton, who led the investigation, stated that "they're a safe airline and they're equipped and staffed to continue to be a safe airline," attributing any discrepancies to "sloppy record-keeping."

By August 1985, around 1600 pilots had crossed the picket line, including several hundred who had initially joined the strike, and were working for Continental. Later that month, Continental management broke off talks with the striking pilots, saying that it no longer recognised ALPA as a union representing Continental pilots. Management subsequently released a petition signed by over 90% of those 1600 pilots saying that they did not want to be represented by ALPA.

On 9 September 1985, Continental announced around 440 new pilot positions, saying that it would close applications for those positions in nine days. Following the announcement, ALPA issued a back-to-work call, encouraging striking pilots to reapply for Continental positions so that they would not be forever locked-out of Continental positions, without formally ending the strike. ALPA subsequently announced that it would be suspending picketing. The airline, however, sued ALPA, accusing of it of "malicious intent" in its back-to-work call, claiming that striking pilots who followed the call were doing so in order to disrupt Continental's operations from the inside.

In early October 1985, judge R. Glover Roberts dismissed a petition by the unions that Continental had illegally fired striking pilots and flight attendants. In his ruling, he judged that the company made "strenuous efforts to get the pilots to return to work immediately after filing its bankruptcy petitions" and that "the fact the pilots and flight attendants were not discharged and did not resign, but rather went on strike in and of itself precludes a finding of wrongful discharge." Later that month, Continental reported that a $41.3 million profit for the third fiscal quarter of 1985.

At the end of October 1985, after two weeks of negotiations between lawyers representing Continental management and the striking pilots, judge R. Glover Roberts ordered ALPA to end the pilots' strike. In his order, the judge included a settlement guaranteeing that striking pilots who returned to work would keep their seniority at the airline and those that chose not to would be granted severance pay, and all remaining litigation connected to the strike would be dropped. ALPA accepted the order. After over two years, the strikes against Continental Airlines that began in August 1983 were over.

== Legacy and analysis ==
Continental Airlines exited bankruptcy in 1986. According to Gregg Easterbrook of The New York Times, "suddenly, there existed on the national level what had once existed only intrastate - a nonunion carrier with a cost structure significantly lower than that of its competitors. During the first year in bankruptcy, Lorenzo shaved Continental's labor costs to 21.2 percent of operating expenses. The airline industry would not be the same again." Isaac Cohen of San Jose State University has described the outcome of the strike as "utter triumph of management: Continental came out of the strike a larger, financially stronger, and more profitable carrier."

Writer Harry Bernstein wrote in 1987 that Continental "pioneered a way to break union contracts in 1983," making Lorenzo "a nationwide symbol of union-busting." Legal scholar Ganesh Sitaraman wrote in 2023 that "the episode turned Lorenzo into the most hated figure among airline employees."

The strategy of the unions in the strikes has also been criticised. IAM president William W. Winpisinger admitted in 1989, as the 1989 Eastern Air Lines strike (Eastern Air Lines also being controlled by Lorenzo) that the failure of the strike "taught the entire labor movement a lesson." Cohen has noted that there existed significant "internal union problems," including a divide between pilots who had worked for Continental prior to the merger with Texas International and pilots who had come from TIA. Northwest Airlines vice-president Skip Eglet stated that, prior to the strike, Continental pilots had a reputation for "not being good trade-union guys," noting that they had previously failed to respect picket lines by mechanics and flight attendants. Hopkins wrote that the strike "began in a welter of confusion and disarray. On the union side, nobody was ready for it, no plans had been made, no communications were established and nobody knew what to do." In 2001, as ALPA attempted to return as the union for Continental pilots (replacing the Independent Association of Continental Pilots, which had been formed in 1993 after seven years without a pilots' union at the airline), Laura Goldberg of The Houston Chronicle wrote that "some Continental pilots haven't forgiven ALPA for the strike of 1983-85. They strongly believe the union mismanaged the affair, with some believing a strike was a mistake in the first place and others critical that ALPA didn't end the walkout when it became clear it couldn't win. Other pilots, including some ALPA members at other airlines, remain angry at those who crossed the line in the 1980s."

The role of the American government and courts in the strike has also been questioned. According to Cohen, "deregulation evoked much sympathy for airline management in Congress, the courts, the governmental agencies, and the public, and thereby was quite instrumental in helping Frank Lorenzo win." Cohen has also noted that Lorenzo "cultivated close ties with key government officials in two government agencies: the CAB and the FAA. Former CAB and FAA officials not only sat on the board of directors of Lorenzo's diverse airlines, but also held high-ranking executive positions in Continental... Such close ties between government officials and airlines executives may help to explain why both the CAB and the FAA ruled consistently in favor of Continental management."

The longer-term success of Lorenzo's tactics at Continental, however, has been debated. In 1990, Continental again declared bankruptcy under Chapter 11. Barbara Kiviat of Time Magazine wrote that strategy "worked so well for Continental in 1983 that it went back again," but this time for different reasons, as "spiking fuel costs and a heavy debt load from an aggressive expansion strategy, plotted by the same chairman who broke the unions less than a decade before, overtook the company." In 2002, Nancy Brown Johnson of the University of Kentucky wrote that Lorenzo's union-busting approach in the American airline industry "has largely failed. With the exception of Delta, most major carriers are largely unionised," while noting that Gordon Bethune was widely credited with turning Continental's reputation around after becoming the airline's CEO in 1994.

== See also ==
- List of airline bankruptcies in the United States
- Braniff International Airways
- Johns Manville
