= John O'Donnell =

John O'Donnell may refer to:

== Sportsmen ==
- John O'Donnell (baseball), 19th-century Major League Baseball player
- John O'Donnell (boxer) (born 1985), Irish boxer
- John O'Donnell (Australian footballer) (born 1947), Australian footballer for St Kilda
- John O'Donnell (rugby union, born 1902) (c. 1902–c. 1990), rugby union player who represented Australia
- John O'Donnell (Gaelic footballer) (1910–1954), Irish Gaelic footballer who represented Donegal and Ulster
- John O'Donnell (rugby, born 1993), Irish rugby player

== Other ==
- John O'Donnell (Lewis County, New York) (1827–1899), New York assemblyman, state senator, railroad commissioner
- John O'Donnell (merchant) (1749–1805), Irish-born merchant based in Baltimore, a statue of whom was removed in 2021
- John O'Donnell (music journalist) (born 1962), Australian music journalist and record producer
- John O'Donnell (poet), Irish-Australian soldier and poet
- John O'Donnell (political journalist) (1896–1961), American political journalist
- John O'Donnell (Irish politician, born 1866) (1866–1920), Irish journalist, Nationalist politician and Member of Parliament
- John O'Donnell (Irish politician, born 1980s), member of Donegal City Council
- John O'Donnell (radio personality) (born 1947), Sydney radio personality
- John F. O'Donnell (died 1993), Irish-born American labor lawyer
- John H. O'Donnell, member of the California legislature
- John J. O'Donnell (1925–2022), American labor union leader
- John Harrison O'Donnell (1838–1912), physician and political figure in Manitoba
- John Francis O'Donnell, Irish journalist and poet

== See also ==
- Jack O'Donnell (disambiguation)
