= Boeing machinists strike =

Boeing machinists strike may refer to:

- 2008 Boeing machinists strike
- 2024 Boeing machinists strike
