= Timeline of strikes in 1989 =

Strikes in 1989

In 1989, a number of labour strikes, labour disputes, and other industrial actions occurred.

== Background ==
A labour strike is a work stoppage caused by the mass refusal of employees to work. This can include wildcat strikes, which are done without union authorisation, and slowdown strikes, where workers reduce their productivity while still carrying out minimal working duties. It is usually a response to employee grievances, such as low pay or poor working conditions. Strikes can also occur to demonstrate solidarity with workers in other workplaces or pressure governments to change policies.

== Timeline ==
=== Continuing strikes from 1988 ===
- 1988–89 Baltimore Symphony Orchestra strike, 22-week strike by Baltimore Symphony Orchestra musicians, the longest symphony strike in the United States at that point.
- 1986–90 Colt strike, 4-year strike by Colt Firearms workers in the United States.
- 1988–89 Hyundai strike, 3-month strike by Hyundai workers in South Korea.
- First Intifada, including strikes, against the Israeli occupation of Palestine.
- Karabakh movement, including strikes, in the Armenian Soviet Socialist Republic, demanding transfer of the Nagorno-Karabakh Autonomous Oblast to Armenia.
- 1988–89 P&O strike
- 1988–91 United States jai alai strike, 3-year strike by jai alai players in the United States.
- 1988–90 Zimbabwe healthcare strikes, series of strikes by healthcare workers, including doctors and nurses, in Zimbabwe.

=== January ===
- 1989 Adelphi University strike, strike by clerical workers at Adelphi University in the United States.
- 1989 Clabecq strike, strike at the Forges of Clabecq in Belgium.
- 1989 Fishery Products International strike, strike by Fishery Products International workers in Newfoundland and Labrador, Canada.
- 1989 Greek judicial strike, 10-day strike by judicial workers in Greece in protest against terrorist attacks targeting the judicial system.
- 1989 Mexican oil strike, by Sindicato de Trabajadores Petroleros de la República Mexicana members after the arrest of Joaquin Hernandez Galicia, the union's leader.
- 1989 Mexican teachers' strike, 5-month strike by teachers in Mexico represented by the Coordinadora Nacional de Trabajadores de la Educación.
- 1989 Moscow air traffic controllers dispute
- 1989 prisoners' hunger strike in South Africa, 24-day hunger strike by prisoners in South Africa, demanding the end of an emergency decree that allowed the South African apartheid government to detail individuals deemed a threat to public safety without charges or trial.
- 1989–1990 unrest in Benin

=== February ===
- 1989 Corsican public sector strike, strike by public sector workers in Corsica.
- 1989 Kosovo miners' strike

=== March ===
- 1989 Brazilian general strike, 48-hour general strike in Brazil against wage freezes.
- 1989 Eastern Air Lines strike, 285-day strike by pilots at Eastern Air Lines in the United States.

=== April ===
- Pittston Coal strike
- 1989 Tiananmen Square protests and massacre, including hunger strikes.

=== May ===
- 1989 BBC strikes, series of strikes by BBC journalists and technicians over wages.
- 1989 Los Angeles teachers' strike, 9-day strike by teachers in Los Angeles, United States, represented by the United Teachers Los Angeles, over wages and administrative control.
- 1989 Philippines general strike, general strike in the Philippines over wages.
- 1989 Turkish steelworkers' strike

=== June ===
- 1989 Daewoo strike
- 1989 Dominican Republic general strike
- 1989 prisoners' hunger strike in Turkey, in protest against prison conditions.

=== July ===
- 1990s Donbas miners' strikes
- 1989 Highland Valley strike, 3-and-a-half month strike by miners at the Highland Valley Copper mine in Canada.
- 1989 Soviet miners' strikes.

=== August ===
- 1989 Australian pilots' dispute
- 1989 Helwan strike, strike by steelworkers in Helwan, Egypt.
- 1989 Indian general strike, general strike by opponents of Rajiv Gandhi's government in India.
- 1989 NYNEX strike, 15-week strike by NYNEX telephone workers in the United States.
- 1989 Russians in Estonia strike, strike by Russians in Estonia in the Estonian Soviet Socialist Republic, organised by the Intermovement, against a new law on voting rights passed by the Popular Front of Estonia.

=== September ===
- 1989 Azerbaijani rail strike, strike by Azerbaijani rail workers aiming to block entry of goods into Armenia, part of the Nagorno-Karabakh conflict.
- 1989–1990 British ambulance strike
- 1989 New York City Opera strike, 7-week strike by New York City Opera musicians in the United States.
- 1989 Québec nurses' strike
- 1989 Peugeot strike, 7-week strike by Peugeot automobile workers in France.

=== October ===
- 1989 Boeing strike, 48-day strike by Boeing factory workers in the United States against forced overtime.
- 1989 Bolivian teachers' strike

=== November ===
- 1989–90 British Aerospace strike, 5-month strike by British Aerospace calling for a 35-hour work week.
- 1989 Colombian judicial strike, strike by judges and judicial workers in Colombia following the killing of a judge in Medellín.
- 1989 TELCO strike, strike by TATA Engineering and Locomotive Company workers in Pune.

== Changes in legislation ==
In October, the Supreme Soviet of the Soviet Union passed a bill that granted Soviet workers limited rights to strike.
