= IACP =

IACP may be:

- International Academy of Compounding Pharmacists
- International Association of Canine Professionals
- International Association of Chiefs of Police
- International Association for China Planning
- International Association of Culinary Professionals
- Independent Association of Continental Pilots
- Istituto Autonomo Case Popolari
