= Duane Woerth =

American labor Union leader

Duane E. Woerth
- Born: 1948 (age 77–78); Scribner, Nebraska, United States
- Occupations: Pilot, labor union leader
- Known for: Former American labor union leader

Duane E. Woerth (born 1948) is an American pilot and former American labor union leader.

== Early years and military service ==
Born in Scribner, Nebraska, Woerth served in the United States Air Force, eventually becoming a lieutenant colonel in the Air National Guard.

== Career ==
After leaving the air force, he became a pilot with Braniff Airlines, for five years, then served with Northwest Airlines for 23 years. From 1993 to 1998, he sat on its board of directors.

He was active in the Air Line Pilots Association (ALPA), and served as its first vice president for eight years, then executive vice president. He also represented ALPA on the board of the International Federation of Air Line Pilots' Associations.

In 1998, Woerth was elected as president of ALPA. Under his leadership, the union grew by absorbing various independent pilots' unions, while its financial position was strengthened, and donations to its political action committee doubled. He also served as a vice-president of the AFL-CIO.

== Later life ==
Woerth retired from the union in 2006, and from the AFL-CIO in 2007. That year, he was a co-founder of the big data and marketing firm Sojern, and he then served on its board of directors. From 2010 to 2013, he also represented the United States on the council of the International Civil Aviation Organization.

Trade union offices
Preceded by Randy Babbitt	President of the Air Line Pilots' Association; 1998–2006	Succeeded by John Prater
