= 1989 Eastern Air Lines strike =

The 1989 Eastern Air Lines strike was a 285-day strike by Eastern Air Lines flight crew in the United States in sympathy with action taken by ground workers for the airline. In early March 1989, the airline began a lockout against mechanics and ramp service employees due to those employees' refusal to accept significant salary and benefits cuts. Shortly after the lockout announcement, the airline's pilots walked off the job, launching a strike in sympathy with the ground employees. The strike would continue until November 1989.

== Background ==
Eastern Air Lines was a scheduled airline in the United States, headquartered at Miami International Airport.

In 1986, the airline was purchased by Frank Lorenzo and his Texas Air Corporation. Lorenzo was notorious in the aviation industry for his reputation as a corporate raider and an aggressive union buster, including his use of bankruptcy in 1983 to break a strike by Continental Airlines workers in 1983. According to Air Line Pilots Association archivist Kathy Mauser,

Almost immediately after taking control Lorenzo began demanding unions take pay cuts and change working rules, he pushed pilots to work while sick and to ignore FAA flight time regulations, and attempted to get around maintenance regulations. The pilots started a campaign, Max Safety, to bring attention to these safety violations, gaining national attention and bringing EAL under FAA scrutiny. Lorenzo also began to sell Eastern assets to Continental for less than they were worth; damaging Eastern’s ability to make a profit while blaming EAL’s financial problems on the high price of labor.

Under Lorenzo, Eastern also fired a quarter of its workforce, dropped services to over a dozen cities, and sold the profitable Eastern Air Lines Shuttle to real estate businessman Donald Trump, who used it to create the Trump Shuttle. Janice Castro of Time Magazine wrote that "few labor-management battles in the 1980s have matched in bitterness the feud between Texas Air Chairman Frank Lorenzo and the machinists at Eastern Air Lines."

== Prelude ==
At the end of 1987, the collective bargaining agreement between Eastern Air Lines and its mechanists and ramp employees, represented by the International Association of Machinists and Aerospace Workers (IAM), expired without a new agreement after several months of stalled negotiations. During the negotiations, Eastern had demanded significant pay cuts from the employees, including a 15% pay cut for machinists and one-third cut for baggage handlers. The IAM, on the other hand, demanded pay raises for the workers.

After the agreement expired, the federal government's National Mediation Board (NMB) stepped in to begin a mediation process between the two sides, led by Harry Bickford.

On 31 January 1989, after a year of mediation, the NMB declared that it had reached an impasse. After Eastern refused to submit to binding arbitration, the NMB declared that a mandatory thirty-day cooling off period would begin before the union could begin strike action.

Before the end of the cooling-off period, the NMB asked American president George H. W. Bush to appoint an emergency board to review the impasse, driven by fears of the potential wide-ranging impact of a strike. The appointment of an emergency board would have increased the cooling-off period by an extra sixty days. Eastern management denounced the request, with senior vice-president Thomas J. Matthews claiming that it "has the effect of totally undermining the negotiations. Is the N.M.B. trying to create an atmosphere for agreement, or do the bidding of one side?" Bush refused the request, saying that he thought it was unlikely an emergency board would be able to make the two sides reach an agreement, while also warning other transport unions not to engage in actions in support of the strike. United States Secretary of Transportation Samuel K. Skinner pledged that the Bush administration would "not stand idly by while the grievances of a few jeopardize the continued safe and efficient transportation of all."

== Strike ==
=== Launch of the strike ===
On 4 March 1989, Eastern mechanics and ramp service employees, represented by the IAM, walked off the job, launching strike action against Eastern's management. Shortly afterwards, Eastern pilots, represented by the ALPA, and flight attendants, also walked off the job, launching a sympathy strike with the ground crew strike.

Benjamin H. Troemel Jr. and James T. Schultz of the Embry–Riddle Aeronautical University, along with Marian C. Schultz of the University of West Florida, wrote that Lorenzo "had thought he could push ALPA to the limit because they still harbored ill feelings toward the IAM for past wage concession discrepancies and the 1986 sale of the airline. He was mistaken." J.B. Stokes, spokesperson for the Miami local of ALPA, told the press that the Eastern management had "obviously underestimated the solidarity of the pilots."

The strike immediately caused significant disruption to Eastern's flight network, with only thirty-five flights taking off in the first day of the strike, compared to a pre-strike average of 1040.

By the fifth day of the strike, Laurent Belsie and Marshall Ingwerson of The Christian Science Monitor noted that it was "rapidly becoming one of the major strikes of the decade... The campaign almost inevitably will be perceived as a key test for organized labor." According to Kenneth M. Jennings of the University of North Florida, the strike "assumed more national publicity than any other labor dispute since the air controllers' strike in 1981."

=== Bankruptcy filing ===
On 9 March 1989, Lorenzo announced that Eastern would be filing for bankruptcy under Chapter 11, Title 11, United States Code. Eastern CEO Phil Bakes told the press that the strike "has not only paralyzed our operation and severely inconvenienced customers, but has precipitated a looming cash crisis at Eastern," while Lorenzo stated that he should not be focus of the strike, saying that "the intensive focus on a single person does a great injustice to the real issues that are at stake in airline deregulation and in our business climate today." Pilot and Air Line Pilots Association (ALPA) head Henry Duffy responded by saying that Lorenzo "is much better at filing for bankruptcy than he is at running an airline," while IAM vice-president John Peterpaul accused Lorenzo of taking "vengeance out on the workers who stood up against his atrocities."

Under Chapter 11, Eastern would not have to pay its creditors, allowing it to conserve cash flow, which it could use to hire strikebreaking staff and continue operations. According to author David Lee Russell, Lorenzo's goal in declaring Eastern bankrupt was to

... reorganise to pay off the creditors, negotiate lower wages, and then merge Eastern with Continental. The problem with his approach was that immediately after the bankruptcy action, the unions began to work towards having Lorenzo and Texas Air separated from Eastern. ALPA moved for the appointment of a trustee to operate the airline.

Burton Lifland of the United States Bankruptcy Court for the Southern District of New York, who had presided over a number of high-profile bankruptcy cases and had a pro-company reputation, was assigned to the case. Ten days after his appointment, Lifland announced that he considered the appointment of a trustee to be too extreme a step to take and that he would instead be accepting Eastern's management's request to appoint an examiner to study a potential sale of Eastern, naming 1st Amendment lawyer David I. Shapiro. In announcing his decision, Lifland described Eastern as a "national asset" and said that he had a duty to "prevent the often bitterly opposed parochial interests of management and the unions from destroying it."

=== Failed sale to Peter Ueberroth ===
In late March, American sports executive and Commissioner of Baseball Peter Ueberroth made a $464-million buyout proposal for Eastern. The bid was rejected, however, in the following days, Ueberroth continued to pursue a buyout. On 6 April, Ueberroth announced that Lorenzo had accepted his bid. As part of the deal, Eastern workers would end the strike and compromise on several salary and benefits demands in exchange for a 30% ownership stake in the airline through an employee stock ownership plan. Another significant ownership stake in airline would be acquired by investment groups Drexel Burnham Lambert and Ardshiel.

When news of the potential sale was announced, many Eastern employees celebrated. The Los Angeles Times quoted flight attendant Joan Babcock as saying that "we supported the American worker instead of the American corporation. This shows what happens if workers stick together," and pilot Ken Wolters as saying that "capitalism is what our economy is based on in the free Western world, but that means capitalism with morality, with ethics, not for greed, not for the gain of only man." The Christian Science Monitor quoted pilot Ron Fletcher as saying that, "We're ready to go back to work under someone who is not interested in tearing down the airline. Money is not really the issue. What we want to know is that Eastern has a future."

The deal with Ueberroth, however, was not yet finalised and was conditional upon Ueberroth being able to broker an official agreement to end the strike by 11 April. Despite the unions agreeing to the compromises on salaries and benefits, attempts to reach a formal agreement soon stalled in the face of the unions' demand that Eastern be removed from Lorenzo's control under the transitional period while the bankruptcy court and regulatory agencies reviewed and approved the agreement. Lorenzo refused to cede control of the airline during this period, saying that "when you sell a house, you don't hand over the keys until the closing, until you've been paid." After further negotiations, Ueberroth appeared to have reached a deal between the unions and Shapiro to appoint former Secretary of Defence Frank Carlucci as trustee to replace Lorenzo at the head of Eastern's operations during the transitional period. However, Eastern's chief bankruptcy attorney Harvey R. Miller threatened to sue the court as soon as he heard of the deal, saying that a trustee could not be appointed under Chapter 11 unless the court had proved gross mismanagement, fraud, or conflict of interest by Lorenzo. In the face of Miller's threat, Lifland announced that he would not appoint a trustee and that Lorenzo would remain in charge of Eastern's operations during any transitional period. Further attempts at negotiations soon faltered, with the unions refusing to accept the appointment of a co-chair of Eastern to share the duties with Lorenzo, as it would still leave Lorenzo partially in charge, and Ueberroth refusing an expedited transitional period that would see the company out of Lorenzo's hands sooner, in case Eastern turned out to be in worse financial shape than he believed.

After more last-minute negotiations failed to gain any traction, Ueberroth announced that the deal had fallen through and that he would end his attempts to buy Eastern Air Lines. On 17 April, Lorenzo released a press statement saying that "Eastern is no longer for sale."

=== Faltering of the pilots' strike ===
On 1 August, Eastern management announced that the airline would be further increasing the number scheduled daily flights to 350, made possible by leasing planes and crew from Continental (also owned by Lorenzo). On 4 August, Eastern pilot and union leader Jack Bavis sparked controversy among the pilots when he called for an end to the strike, leading to a further wave of pilots crossing the picket line; he would subsequently be removed from his position in the union. On 6 August, the union came close to deciding to end the strike, however ultimately decided to continue.

On 12 August, Keith Bradsher of The New York Times reported that the strike was "weakening significantly," following an decision by Lifland to delay a hearing requested by the striking pilots over the company's training of strikebreaking pilots and a new announcement by Eastern management claiming that enough pilots had crossed the picket line to make it viable for the airline to "meet its plan to rebuild as a nonunion carrier that would be two-thirds the size Eastern was before the strike." On 15 August, Eastern again expanded its number of daily flights to 390, by leasing additional planes and crew from Continental, while announcing its intention to reach 602 daily flights by the first week of September. At the same time, the airline also announced that it would a wide range of discounted tickets to attract customers. On 18 August, the ALPA executive board voted against calling a nationwide general strike among pilots due to concerns over the cost of the strike on the union's funds at a time when several other major American airlines were potentially facing labour disputes. In late August, the Federal Aviation Administration released a report requested by Shapiro into the effects of the strike on Eastern's air safety. In the FAA's report, it said that "Eastern's post-strike maintenance performance compares favorably with that of air carriers having equivalent aircraft, fleet size, utilization rates and operating environments." The FAA's report was criticised by striking workers, who claimed that the company had prioritised short-term fixes that kept the planes flying over deeper fixes that addressed root causes of faults.

On 9 October, Bob Baker of The Los Angeles Times reported that, "desperately, labor is trying to find a sense of victory in a strike that virtually every airline industry analyst and many labor experts say has already been lost." In mid-October, Lorenzo and Bakes announced that the company's re-organisation under bankruptcy was proceeding at a quicker pace than expected, crediting the number of pilots that crossed the picket line.

=== End of the strike ===
According to Mauser, by the end of autumn 1989,

with the courts favoring Lorenzo, hopes for a buyout gone, and many of Eastern’s assets sold off, there was not much else ALPA could do. The pilots’ last hope hung on petitioning Congress to force president Bush to declare a Presidential Emergency Board.

On 20 November, Bush announced that he would veto the bill approved by the House of Representatives to create an emergency board. Bush stated that he was opposed to interfering in the affairs of the bankruptcy court, and did not want to set a precedent for such interference. He also stated that he believed that it was unlikely that an emergency board would be able to break the impasse between the unions and management, and that he did not want to set a precedent for interfering in collective bargaining.

IAM leader George Kourpias criticized Bush for making that decision at a time when Bush publicly supported the Solidarity movement in Poland, saying that Bush's "praise for union workers in Poland does not extend to workers in America." Lorenzo, who had supported Bush in Bush's campaign in the 1988 United States presidential election, wrote Bush a letter praising his courage in vetoing the bill.

On 22 November, the pilots voted to end their strike. When announcing the results of the decision, union officials blamed the American government, saying that the pilots had faced "a hostile administration and an indifferent bureaucracy and judicial system." Eastern management stated of the pilots' decision that "it is unfortunate that it did not come earlier. We could have avoided all the trauma and heartache which has affected Eastern and its employees," while adding that the airline did not have any jobs for the pilots to return to as it already had enough pilots from the strikebreakers.

The day after the end of the pilots' strike, the flight attendants' union announced that it would be ending its sympathy strike as well. The IAM, on the other hand, continued its strike.

== Aftermath ==
In April 1990, after negotiations between Eastern's management and its creditors broke down, with creditors rejecting Lorenzo's attempts to convince them to restructure the debt so that the airline only had to pay 25 cents for each dollar of debt, Lifland declared the company's management "not competent," and appointed former Continental Airlines president Martin Shugrue to take over control of the airline's operations. Shugrue launched efforts to find new investors for the airline and to increase revenue, but was ultimately unsuccessful. In January 1991, Eastern Air Lines ceased operations.

E.J. Breen, who had served on the pilots' strike committee in 1989, described the closure of Eastern as "like the loss of a loved one," while IAM leader Charles Bryan stated that "I regret that the strike had to happen, but there was absolutely no choice... If there's a lesson to be learned by corporate America, it proves that union-busting is bad business." Mary Jane Barry, who had been head of flight attendants' union during the strike, stated that "Eastern management, led by Frank Lorenzo, chose a course of action that guaranteed disaster. Lorenzo’s team improperly transferred millions in assets to Continental Airlines, fired long-term employees and provoked a strike as a final strategy to destroy the work force."

Agis Salpukas of The New York Times wrote in 1991 that the strike was ultimately

a Pyrrhic victory for Mr. Lorenzo. The rebuilding did not go smoothly. Eastern was plagued by mechanical problems, and the new people, while highly motivated, lacked experience and polish. Eastern's business remained disappointing, and the airline continued to lose money. The safety issues aside, Eastern's prospects for a revival were probably damaged when an examiner appointed by the bankruptcy court, David Shapiro, found last spring that there were 12 transactions between Texas Air and Eastern where there was evidence of possible improper action. As a result, Mr. Shapiro said, Texas Air, which is now known as Continental Airlines Holdings Inc., could have deprived Eastern of $280 million to $400 million. This finding seemed to bulwark the unions' earlier complaints that Mr. Lorenzo was stripping Eastern of some of its most profitable operations, like its computerized reservation service, in order to prop up Continental Airlines.
