= Jack O'Donnell =

Jack O'Donnell may refer to:

- Jack O'Donnell (footballer) (1897–?), English professional football player
- Jack O'Donnell (rugby union) (c. 1877–c. 1956), rugby union player who represented Australia
- Jack O'Donnell (businessman), owner of inMusic Brands

== See also ==
- John O'Donnell (disambiguation)
