= John Prater =

American labor union leader

John H. Prater is a former American labor union leader.

Prater served as an airline pilot with Continental Airlines from 1978. He joined the Air Line Pilots' Association (ALPA), rising from chairing a strike committee, to chairing the Master Executive Council for Continental pilots. In this role, he convinced the Independent Association of Continental Pilots to merge into ALPA, in 2001. He also served as vice-chair of the Wings Alliance.

In 2006, Prater was elected as president of ALPA, promising to bargain harder, strictly enforce existing contracts, and put more efforts into organizing pilots. He started his term at the beginning of 2007. He also won election to the executive of the AFL-CIO. In 2010, he was defeated for re-election as leader of ALPA by Lee Moak, and in 2011 he left the AFL-CIO executive. He retired as a pilot in 2017.

Trade union offices
Preceded by Duane Woerth	President of the Air Line Pilots' Association; 2007–2010	Succeeded by Lee Moak
