= 2025 Boeing machinists' strike =

Labor action in Missouri and Illinois, US

- Cities in which the strike occurred (Note: The state highlighted is Missouri; the city of Mascoutah lies in the neighboring state of Illinois.)
- Date: August 4, 2025 – November 13, 2025; (3 months, 1 week and 2 days)
- Location: St. Louis, Missouri, United States; St. Charles, Missouri, United States; Mascoutah, Illinois, United States
- Caused by: Union's rejection of Boeing labor contract
- Goals: Obtaining a contract with higher wages, increased benefits, and improved working conditions
- Methods: Strike action; Picketing
- Result: Strike ended with new contract

Parties
International Association of Machinists and Aerospace Workers District 837	Boeing

On August 4, 2025, the 3,200 members of International Association of Machinists and Aerospace Workers (IAM) District 837 started a labor strike after they rejected a new employment contract from Boeing. For the next few months, the company's facilities in the cities of St. Louis and St. Charles in Missouri and Mascoutah in Illinois suffered a shortage in manpower. Boeing attempted to end the strikes four times by making minor improvements to their contract offers, but union members turned down the modified contracts since, in their view, it failed to address longstanding issues. A subsequent union-offered contract was ignored by Boeing, and the company decided to hire permanent replacement workers and shift certain aircraft work to other facilities in an effort to minimize the impact of the strike. The union voted to accept a fifth offer in November 2025, ending the strike on 13 November 2025. The strikers failed to secure a demanded 401(k) match, $10,000 ratification bonus and wage increases for longtime employees; however the strikers were able to obtain an extra year of pay rises for top-paid employees.

== Background ==
IAM District 837 is composed of around 3,200 members who primarily work on military aircraft in the vicinity of St. Louis, Missouri, including the F-15EX, F/A-18, T-7A, and MQ-25. District 837 is also planned to work on the Boeing F-47, a future aircraft that Boeing and Lockheed Martin were tasked with producing by the Department of Defense in March 2025.

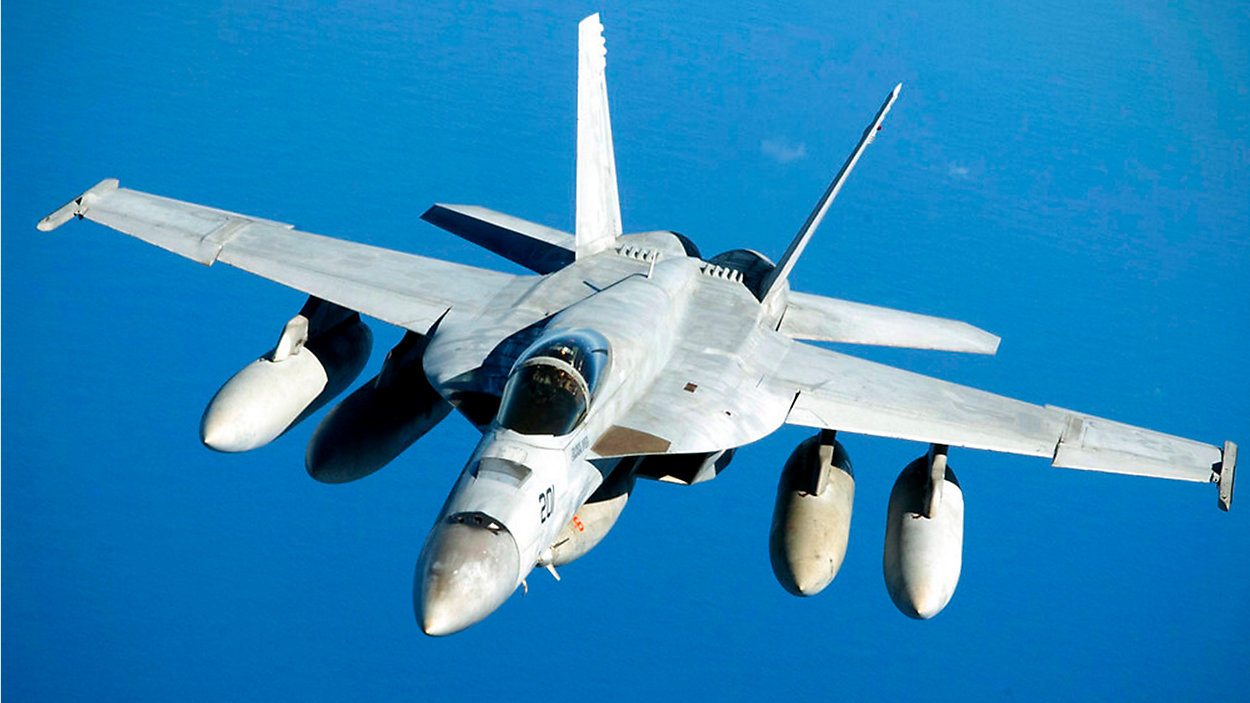
An F/A-18 Super Hornet produced by Boeing and operated by the United States Navy, an example of the type of hardware worked on by District 837 members for the US Armed Forces.

=== Lead-up to the strike ===
IAM District 837 members rejected a new labor contract offer from Boeing by an overwhelming vote on July 27, 2025, the same day the previous contract expired. The proposed contract included a 20% wage growth over four years, along with $5,000 signing bonuses and additions to retirement funds.

On August 3, District 837 voted to decline a modified version of the contract previously rejected on July 27; in it, the proposed wage growth was unchanged.

== Timeline ==
Around 3,200 members of District 837 began their strike on August 4 outside of Boeing production facilities in three cities: St. Louis and St. Charles in Missouri, and Mascoutah in Illinois. Soon after, Dan Gillian, vice president of Boeing's Air Dominance division (Note: The division responsible for producing military fighter aircraft and drones.) and St. Louis senior site executive, expressed disappointment and claimed that the contract from August 3 "featured 40 percent average wage growth", but striking employees stated that this was false and that many workers would only gain a net 12% wage increase at the end of the four-year period instead of the listed 20%. Additionally, the contract contained several downsides for long-time workers: for half of the years, they would receive lump-sum bonuses in place of wage increases, and a contract from 2014 designed to lower pay raises during high inflation ensured that veteran machinists would not see any increase in wage at all for several years.

As the strike entered its second week, the picketing campaign intensified, with thousands of workers filling the sidewalks in protest outside of the St. Louis facility. Union leadership also reached out to U.S government officials from the Missouri congressional delegation for support; by the next week, U.S. representatives Wesley Bell and Nikki Budzinski (Note: From Illinois's 13th congressional district.) were pressuring Boeing to continue talks with District 837.

Throughout the strike, all three primary facilities remained open, with Boeing still being able to deliver jets and test flights. Boeing stated that District 837 members only composed 20% of all employees in the region. Additionally, Boeing was less economically strained than during the strikes the previous year because the strike was affecting lower-rate aircraft production (as compared to the Boeing 737 production line that was stalled in 2024), production that was also being partially financed by the United States government; this leeway allowed the company to avoid contract negotiations, hire replacement workers, and attempt to outlast the striking workers. Still, even with the aid of temporary workers, aircraft production slowed, and the prolonged strike created delivery delays and impacted Boeing's profit margins.

On September 4, Boeing announced that it would be hiring permanent replacements for the striking workers' positions. Gillian stated that District 837 was being too demanding, and that this alienated the company, thus necessitating bringing in replacements as "...taking the next step in our contingency plan.” Gillian also claimed that the contract from August 3 was the best ever offered to District 837, and thus Boeing would only be willing to make minor changes to the agreement without changing the general layout. The international president of the IAM, Brian Bryant, criticized the replacements as Boeing "...doubling down on its mismanagement..."; he additionally called out Boeing's removal of the $5,000 signing bonuses from the contract as disrespectful towards the striking workers. Doubts were expressed among union members as to whether Boeing would be able to suitably replace the 3,200 workers, with one mechanic believing the move to be a dividing tactic.

On September 10, District 837 and Boeing reached a tentative agreement that was to be voted on two days later. This new contract, compared to the one from August 3, would last a year longer and raise the wage boost from 20% to 24%. The contract also re-introduced signing bonuses that were originally scrapped by Boeing post-August 3, although they were $1,000 lower than before. On September 12, District 837 members turned down the agreement, with about 57% of the striking force voting against it. Downsides for long-time workers were cited as the primary issue once again: it would take fifteen years instead of the regular five to seven for the wage increase to be complete, and lump-sum payments were still present. The length of the strike became a financial burden for some union members, with one stating that he voted for the agreement because “I've been without a paycheck for two months, and it's really starting to weigh on me." Ultimately, the contract was declined; as one worker put it: “The younger crowd realized that it wasn't in everyone's best interest, so we all stuck together, showed solidarity.”

Several days after rejecting Boeing's third contract offer, District 837 announced it would vote on a new, union-created contract. This contract added several benefits on top of the preexisting offered contract: a guaranteed 20% wage increase, $10,000 signing bonuses, consistent wage growth for longstanding employees, better 401(k) benefits, and a return to the four-year timeline. According to IAM, this new contract improved upon the company-created offer by bringing the signing bonuses to a similar level as the $12,000 bonuses gained by Seattle-based workers in 2024, along with tackling the grievances held by veteran workers. The contract was subsequently approved by District 837 membership. Gillian stated that Boeing would not accept the union-proposed contract, called the effort a "publicity stunt", and said that the contract "isn't real". IAM representative Jody Bennett responded, saying, "Boeing’s attempt to dismiss the IAM District 837 membership-ratified proposal, overwhelmingly approved by the striking men and women on the shop floor, as ‘not real’ is both insulting and dishonest."

On September 24, Boeing announced that the task of upgrading F/A-18 Super Hornet jets would be moved away from the St. Louis facility. IAM representative Tom Boelling called the move "deeply disappointing", although Gillian did not officially note the strike as a reason, instead claiming that the move was being done to make room for the F-47 sixth generation fighter jet program.

In part due to pressure from the Congressional Labor Caucus and other figures of government, Boeing accepted restarting negotiations with District 837, and both parties released a joint statement on September 25 in which they agreed to negotiate with the aid of a federal mediator. Negotiations began on September 29; however, by the end of the day talks had already fallen apart. Boeing continued to push the same contract that District 837 had rejected on September 12, but union representatives stated that they were not willing to “re-vote a rejected offer.”

On October 1, hundreds of striking workers rallied in Hazelwood at the IAM District 837 union hall, both as an act of solidarity with one another and as an expression of anger towards Boeing's refusal to move beyond its own proposed contract. Present workers expressed discontent over being treated as disposable, the quick hiring of replacement workers, and what they called "scare tactics". Also in attendance were representatives of the AFL-CIO, SPEEA, St. Louis Labor Council, and IAM District 751 (the same district that led the 2024 strikes in Seattle). Boeing continued to decline negotiating over the union-proposed offer, with Gillian stating, "Your union leadership is telling you to hold out for a $10K ratification bonus and a different 401(k) formula. But I want to be clear: there is no more coming." Boeing Defense CEO Steve Parker would later reaffirm this message.

On October 9, the United States Air Force officially noted that the delivery of F-15EX aircraft had stalled due to the strike, with only half of the expected dozen new jets having been delivered. This delay specifically impacted operations at the Portland Air National Guard Base in Oregon; broadly, the strike impacted military aircraft deliveries into 2026, including overseas shipments.

District 837 filed an Unfair Labor Practice charge against Boeing on October 16 via the National Labor Relations Board, alleging bad faith in negotiations. Talks between both parties continued even after the filing, however.

Despite a lack of endorsement from the union's bargaining committee, District 837 members voted on a modified offer from Boeing on October 26. The striking workers rejected the five-year offer. IAM International President Brian Bryant said after the vote that "Boeing claimed they listened to their employees, the result of today's vote proves they have not..."

In November 2025, about 3200 members of the union voted to approve Boeing's latest offer by a 68% margin, after rejecting the company's previous offer. This offer was significantly worse than the previous September 2025 offer, with the union failing to secure their demanded 401(k) benefit match, higher wage increases for longtime employees and a $10,000 ratification bonus. Labor experts said that "Time caught up to the strikers. After more than three months of missing paychecks and losing health insurance, members settled for less than the union proposed" with additional pressure being played on striking workers to agree to a deal due to Boeing threatening to replace striking workers with hired full time replacements and pressures brought by the 2025 United States federal government shutdown.

== Analysis ==
Washington University sociology professor Jake Rosenfeld compared the strikes to those that occurred the previous year at Boeing facilities in the Pacific Northwest, noting that in both of them a series of contracts from Boeing were repeatedly rejected by strikers in order to send a strong message to the company. Additionally, he pointed out that Boeing benefitted from the lack of public attention focused on the St. Louis strike as compared to the one in Seattle; this allowed for them to harshly resist negotiation efforts.

== See also ==
- 2008 Boeing machinists' strike
- 2024 Boeing machinists' strike
