= John O'Donnell (Australian footballer) =

Australian rules footballer (1947–2018)

Personal information
- Full name: John O'Donnell
- Born: 8 June 1947
- Died: 13 November 2018 (aged 71)
- Original team: Xavier College
- Height: 184 cm (6 ft 0 in)
- Weight: 81 kg (179 lb)
- Position: Forward

Playing career^{1}
Years	Club	Games (Goals)
1968–70	St Kilda	33 (27)
- ^{1} Playing statistics correct to the end of 1970.

John O'Donnell (8 June 1947 – 13 November 2018) was an Australian rules footballer who played with St Kilda in the Victorian Football League (VFL).

He sustained a knee injury after taking a high mark over Ross Dunne, and contracted golden staph from the subsequent operation. The infection was severe, and he was unable to make a return to the VFL.

O'Donnell's cousin, Simon O'Donnell, was a cricketer for Australia and Victoria and also played VFL football for St Kila.
