= John O'Donnell (poet) =

John P O'Donnell (born 1890; date of death unknown) was an Irish Australian soldier and poet, fl. 1915–1918.

O'Donnell was born in Tuam, County Galway in Ireland in 1890, the son of an accountant in the National Bank. He served in the Australian Army during World War I, arriving at Gallipoli on 25 April 1915. He was there eight months and wounded in that time. A poem of his - "Lines on Australian Graves at Gallipoli" - was published in the Dublin Evening News of 18 September 1915, and he was described as of the machine gun section of the Australian Expeditionary Force, a nephew of the Hon. B. McM. Glynn, iLH.R., having arrived in Australia from Ireland 18 months previously. He received an appointment to the staff of the Bank of Adelaide, and for some time lived with an uncle, the late Dr. Eugene Glynn. When the war broke out he volunteered and landed with the 10th Battalion at Gaba Tepe. He was hit 10 times and wounded four times, and with 28 others was posted as missing, but subsequently the whole 29 reappeared in the trenches. He later fought at the Battle of the Somme. In 1918 he was invalided home, during which time he wrote the last six poems of his only collection, dealing with the war from the perspective of an Australian.

== Bibliography ==
- Songs of an Anzac, Dublin, Brown & Nolan, 1918
