= Independent Association of Continental Pilots =

Former trade union of the United States

The Independent Association of Continental Pilots (IACP) was a bargaining agent (labor union) certified by the National Mediation Board (NMB) on July 12, 1993. The IACP represented the pilots of Continental and Continental Express Airlines and was initially headquartered in Denver, Colorado near Stapleton International Airport.

== History ==
In 1985 a card signing campaign by strike breaking pilots (strikebreaker) gave CEO Frank Lorenzo an excuse for stating that the airline was withdrawing its voluntary recognition of the Air Line Pilots Association, International (ALPA) as the bargaining representative for the Continental pilots. The rationale for this action was based on the belief that since in the 1930s the airline, in the face of an overwhelming number of cards requesting that a representational election be held, agreed to recognize ALPA as the bargaining agent for the pilots without a representational election, that they could withdraw that recognition at any time.

The strike breaking pilots (strikebreaker) of Continental Airlines maintained that after that time they were no longer represented by ALPA, however, ALPA maintained and the National Mediation Board (NMB) confirmed that ALPA continued to represent all Continental pilots despite the airline's pronouncement to the contrary. This confirmation is best evidenced in a letter from the NMB to Continental Airlines in which the NMB notified that since the airline had failed to respond to a Section 6 letter from ALPA to open negotiations, that an NMB representative would present himself at the airline’s headquarters to assist in opening contract negotiations between ALPA and the airline. Additionally, the NMB answered several pilot inquiries about their representational status stating that there had not been any action that resulting in a change to the bargaining agent.

Traditional union representation by ALPA in terms of contract negotiations (collective bargaining) and prosecution of grievances was virtually nonexistent from the end of the pilot strike in 1985, but ALPA vigorously represented the rights of pilots who return to work after the strike. The contentious 1993 representational election conducted by the NMB between the IACP and ALPA settled the question of ALPA representation. The IACP was victorious by a wide 68% margin where more than 92% of the eligible voters participated, the highest participation ever recorded by the NMB. The Continental Express pilots also won the right to be represented by the IACP during that election.

== Negotiations ==
In 1995 the IACP met with exceptional initial success by securing the first contract for the Continental pilots in more than ten years, and the very first contract for the Continental Express pilots. Most noteworthy is that the contracts were negotiated while the airline was mired in its second bankruptcy, and during the life of the Continental contract, overall pilot compensation was increased more than 80%. In 1999 the contract negotiations by the IACP yielded even greater improvements to the pay and benefits of Continental pilots. The Continental pilot contract was followed shortly by a new contract for the Continental Express pilots.

== Merger ==
A third organizational effort by ALPA began officially in 2000 (headed by the then current IACP president captain Pat Burke) was finally successful and approximately 7,000 Continental and Continental Express pilots elected about 2:1 to be represented by ALPA, at which time the IACP ceased to exist (May 22, 2001).
