= John Francis O'Donnell =

Irish journalist and poet (1837–1874)

John Francis O'Donnell (c. 1837 – 17 May 1874) was an Irish journalist and poet.

== Life ==
O'Donnell was born in the city of Limerick, the son of a shopkeeper, and was educated by the Christian Brothers. In his seventeenth year, having acquired a knowledge of shorthand, he joined as a reporter the staff of The Munster News, a bi-weekly paper published in Limerick. At the same time he began to contribute verse to The Nation, the organ of the Young Ireland party, and continued to write prose and poetry for it until his death, twenty years later.

After spending two years as reporter on The Munster News, O'Donnell was appointed sub-editor on The Tipperary Examiner, published in Clonmel; in 1860 he moved to London, where he obtained an appointment on The Universal News, a weekly paper of Roman Catholic and Irish nationalist opinion. He also contributed verse to Chambers's Journal and All the Year Round. Charles Dickens, who then edited the latter journal, wrote the young poet an encouraging letter, and showed kindly interest in him.

=== Dublin, and return to London ===
In 1862 O'Donnell joined in Dublin the editorial staff of The Nation, then edited by A. M. Sullivan, and also acted as editor of Duffy's Hibernian Magazine, a monthly publication; but, with the restlessness which characterised him through life, he was again in London in 1864 as editor of The Universal News, and the next year he became sub-editor of The Tablet. He retained the post until 1868. At this time the Fenian movement was convulsing the country. It is uncertain whether O'Donnell was a member, but he was one of its ablest propagandists in the press. He wrote, with passionate nationalism, numerous poems which, under the noms de guerre of "Caviare" and "Monkton West", he contributed to the Dublin national journals. He also acted as London correspondent of The Irish People, the organ of the Fenian movement, which, with John O'Leary as its editor, was founded in November 1863, and was suppressed by the government in September 1865.

In September 1873 O'Donnell obtained an appointment in the London office of the agent-general of New Zealand. He died, after a brief illness, on 7 May 1874, aged 37, and was buried at Kensal Green Cemetery, London.

== Publications ==
Absorbed in journalism, O'Donnell found little time for purely literary work. The Emerald Wreath, a collection of his prose and verse, published in Dublin as a Christmas annual in 1865, and Memories of the Irish Franciscans, a volume of verse (1871), were his only substantial contributions to literature. Under the auspices of the Southwark Irish Literary Society, O'Donnell's poems were published in 1891, and his grave was marked by a Celtic cross.
