= John J. O'Donnell =

American labor union leader (1925–2022)

John Joseph O'Donnell (January 14, 1925 – March 20, 2022) was an American labor union leader.

Born in Dracut, Massachusetts, O'Donnell served in the United States Navy during World War II, and later, in the United States Air Force. He left in 1956, to become an airline pilot with Eastern Airlines, and joined the Air Line Pilots' Association (ALPA). He serve on ALPA's board of directors from 1960 to 1964, and chaired its retirement and insurance committee from 1966. In 1971, he was elected as president of ALPA, also serving on various government and labor union committees. In 1979, he was also elected as a vice-president of the AFL-CIO. Under his leadership, ALPA established a Flight Security Committee and developed the Human Intervention Motivation Study.

In 1982, O'Donnell was defeated while running for re-election as leader of ALPA. The following year, he was appointed by Ronald Reagan as an assistant secretary of labor.

Trade union offices
Preceded by Charles H. Ruby	President of the Air Line Pilots' Association; 1970–1982	Succeeded by Henry A. Duffy
