= 2008 Boeing machinists' strike =

Mechanist strike

A strike by about 27,000 machinists at Boeing over outsourcing, job security, pay, and benefits began September 7, 2008.

The union, International Association of Machinists, and Boeing appeared unwilling to compromise to settle the strike. The company had 3,700 jets on back order, which union members hoped would put pressure on Boeing to end the strike.

In late October 2008, a tentative deal was reached between Boeing and the union, in which Boeing made a number of concessions. Boeing told SPEEA engineers that the company planned less outsourcing on future airplanes, including the next 787 Dreamliner model.

On November 1, 2008, members of the union ratified the contract, ending the eight-week strike. The new contract was approved by 74 percent of those voting in favor. This was the longest strike against Boeing by this union since 1995, and the fourth in twenty years. The strike cost the union members an average of $7,000 in base pay and cost the company $100 million per day in revenue and penalties with a postponement of the delivery of aircraft. Boeing has a $350 billion backlog.

== See also ==
- 2024 Boeing machinists' strike
- 2025 Boeing machinists' strike
