= 2016 China Airlines flight attendants' strike =

The 2016 China Airlines flight attendants strike refers to a labor strike launched in June 2016 by the Taoyuan Flight Attendants Union in the Republic of China (Taiwan), targeting the cabin crew department of China Airlines. After obtaining the legal right to strike, the union announced the strike would begin at midnight on June 24, 2016, with members ceasing to provide labor services. The strike lasted for three days, with operations resuming in the early morning of June 27. However, a consensus between labor and management was reached as early as June 24, making it a successful case of labor action. It was also the second large-scale strike in Taiwan since the Taiwan Railways Administration engineers' strike on May 1, 1988.

This event was the first ever strike by flight attendants in the Republic of China. It was also the second instance in Taiwan's aviation history where aviation employees obtained the legal right to strike, following the 2015 efforts by the Taoyuan Pilots Union. These legal rights were made possible by amendments to Taiwan's "three labor laws" in 2011. However, since the pilots union ultimately did not launch a strike, the 2016 strike marked the first instance where legally sanctioned strike rights were both obtained and exercised.

== Background ==
China Airlines is the national carrier of the Republic of China (Taiwan). Even after privatization, the government has retained significant control over the company. Due to recurring disputes over issues like crew rest times and wages, China Airlines has experienced several labor-management conflicts in the past.

After the launch of cross-strait charter in 2008 and the signing of a new aviation agreement between Taiwan and Japan in October 2011, flight frequencies rapidly increased. Additionally, the rise of low-cost carriers led to a surge in overnight "red-eye" flights. Traditional carriers, trying to stay competitive, also began adding more red-eye routes, significantly disrupting the biological clocks of Flight attendant. Meanwhile, surging global oil prices made profitability difficult for airlines, prompting executives to cut costs wherever possible. As a result, working conditions deteriorated, leave became scarcer, and wages were reduced.

According to Taiwan's Trade Union Act, only one union is allowed per enterprise. If a company union is controlled by management, the union's ability to represent workers is weakened. This was the case with China Airlines' own union. Although in 2013, labor representatives gained control over the union's third chapter (primarily composed of flight attendants), and participated in several protest actions, the chapter was not recognized by management as a valid negotiation counterpart. To obtain legal rights to labor disputes, the chapter was restructured in November 2015 into the Taoyuan Flight Attendants Union.

On May 5, 2016, China Airlines announced, in accordance with its internal policies, that starting from June 1, flight attendants' check-in location would be changed from Songshan District in Taipei City to the company's headquarters in Taoyuan City. At the same time, the company unilaterally required flight attendants to sign a responsibility agreement based on Article 84-1 of the Labor Standards Act. However, this move would result in reduced rest time between assignments for the flight attendants. Under the responsibility system, flight attendants were also expected to use their own time to complete tasks that were previously counted as working hours. As a result, the implementation of the new system made flight duties more exhausting due to insufficient rest time.

== Pre-strike negotiations ==
On the morning of May 13, at 10:00 AM, more than 150 flight attendants organized by the Taoyuan Flight Attendants Union protested in front of the Ministry of Labor, opposing China Airlines' changes to working conditions. Protesters accused the company of exploiting Article 84-1 of the Labor Standards Act to circumvent labor protections and demanded a return to standard labor conditions. The union also displayed over 1,000 authorization forms signed by China Airlines flight attendants and consent forms required by the company for the new policy, demonstrating their readiness to launch a strike.

In response, the Ministry of Labor urged both sides to communicate sincerely and in good faith without violating labor laws. China Airlines expressed a willingness to examine the issues and make adjustments.

On May 20, during the early stages of the strike threat, China Airlines' General Manager Chang Yu-Hern submitted his resignation, which was not accepted by then Minister of Transportation and Communications, Hochen Tan.

On the afternoon of May 31, the Taoyuan Flight Attendants Union joined forces with the Pilots Union, which was dissatisfied with accumulated leave days, and the China Airlines Maintenance Workers Union, which was demanding better working conditions. Together, over a thousand employees—including pilots, flight attendants, and maintenance workers—staged a large-scale protest. Beginning at 4:00 AM, three flight attendants—Luo Yongxiang, Hong Beidi, and Xie Yizhong—protested in front of China Airlines' Taipei branch by standing for 12 hours to highlight the physical toll of red-eye flights, especially on long routes such as Changchun, Phnom Penh, and Bangkok, where in-flight work could last up to 11–12 hours. The protest received support from some members of the public.

That same morning, General Manager Chang Yu-Hern issued a five-point statement, acknowledging shortcomings in communication but denying that the policy changes had affected working hours or workers' rights. He also suggested submitting the dispute to arbitration to prevent further social unrest.

Despite Chang's appeal for employees to remain at their posts, the Taoyuan Flight Attendants Union announced plans for a collective leave action on June 9, the Dragon Boat Festival. The Pilots Union also declared that 800 union members would take leave on the same day. In response, Chang stated that 20 employees who had recently transitioned from flight attendant roles to ground positions would be reassigned to fill the staffing gap.

Following these protests and the union's threat of a strike, China Airlines retaliated by dismissing key members of the Maintenance Workers Union, including Liu Huizong and Zhu Meixue. This move drew criticism from Democratic Progressive Party (DPP) legislator Tuan Yi-kang.

On June 13, China Airlines requested the Taoyuan City Government to initiate compulsory arbitration. However, Taoyuan Mayor Cheng Wen-tsan urged the airline to proactively communicate and negotiate with the union to resolve the conflict. The city's Labor Bureau also noted that compulsory arbitration would prevent the union from holding a strike vote, thereby infringing upon workers' right to strike. Moreover, unlike voluntary arbitration, compulsory arbitration is not binding, and if the union rejected the outcome, further mediation would be required—potentially leading to an endless loop.

=== Response from the chairman ===
China Airlines Chairman Sun Hung-Hsiang stated that since all other China Airlines employees reported for duty at the Taoyuan Airport, agreeing to the union's demand for Taipei check-ins would be unfair. Regarding the union's demand to raise overseas per diem allowances for flight attendants, Sun said that China Airlines had already agreed to increase the rate from USD 2 per hour to USD 3, which was higher than the industry average. However, the union insisted on USD 5 per hour, which he argued would place a significant financial burden on the company's future operations.

== Strike vote ==
Although the May 31 demonstration garnered significant support from employees, China Airlines insisted on enforcing the new check-in policy and did not respond positively to the demands. After negotiations between the Taoyuan Flight Attendants Union and China Airlines failed, the union decided to initiate the strike procedure for flight attendants employed by China Airlines. On June 10, the union conducted a strike vote limited to 2,638 union members working as flight attendants for China Airlines, setting up voting stations in Taipei, Kaohsiung, and Taoyuan. A 70% approval threshold for the strike was also established during an ad hoc union delegate meeting. The vote received strong support from China Airlines' flight attendants. The Taoyuan City Government's Labor Department stated that it would not proceed with mandatory arbitration, and Taoyuan Mayor Cheng Wen-tsan also emphasized the importance of equal negotiations between labor and management, noting that there was no precedent for compulsory arbitration in Taiwan, and even arbitration requires further labor-management negotiations.

In response to the strike vote, the China Airlines Enterprise Union held a press conference in Taipei on June 20, criticizing the strike as being led by a union external to China Airlines and alleging external manipulation of the movement. They also called for job stability and protection of workers' rights. However, these statements drew criticism from the Taoyuan Confederation of Trade Unions, which accused the enterprise union of acting as a "company-controlled union," claiming that it no longer represented grassroots employees and that pilots, maintenance staff, and flight attendants had to establish separate unions. During the strike, members of the Taoyuan Flight Attendants Union were not required to report to work, and China Airlines, as the employer, was not obligated to pay them.

=== Strike vote passed ===
On the evening of June 21, the Taoyuan Flight Attendants Union began counting the votes. The result showed 2,535 in favor of striking, 9 against, and 3 invalid ballots—an approval rate of over 99.5%, far exceeding the 70% threshold. The union thus announced it had obtained the legal right to strike and would officially launch the action during the summer vacation, planning another protest by the end of June. In response, both the Ministry of Labor and the Ministry of Transportation and Communications of the Republic of China said they would actively mediate and encourage ongoing negotiations. The Ministry of Labor expressed respect for the union's actions, while the Ministry of Transportation urged the union to make some concessions.

Following the union's acquisition of strike rights, China Airlines issued a statement saying it would not abandon communication and was drafting alternative plans to deal with the strike. The Consumers' Foundation stated that China Airlines must adapt without compromising passenger safety. On the morning of June 22, China Airlines General Manager Chang Yu-heng expressed regret over the union's unwillingness to communicate and stated that the company was willing to negotiate sincerely, hoping the union would not proceed with the strike. China Airlines also questioned the discrepancy between the number of people who voted and the figures announced by the union and said it had prepared over 600 backup personnel and contingency plans. These included adjusting flight schedules, changing aircraft, and requesting other airlines to assist with passenger transfers to minimize disruption.

That same morning, more than 20 members of the Taoyuan Flight Attendants Union held a press conference at the Civil Aeronautics Administration (CAA), titled "Does the CAA Care That China Airlines Ignores Flight Safety?" A scuffle briefly broke out. The union questioned the CAA's handling of aviation safety during the strike and criticized its lack of action against China Airlines for ignoring labor rights. Regarding China Airlines' plan to recall retired flight attendants after only four days of training, the CAA stated that former staff must undergo adequate retraining or face penalties.

== Strike begins ==
On June 23, the Taoyuan Flight Attendants Union announced that its members employed by China Airlines would begin a strike at midnight on June 24. At 11 p.m. that night, General Manager Chang Yu-heng, in a video conference, announced that all China Airlines flights departing from Taoyuan and Songshan airports between 6 a.m. and 10 p.m. on June 24 would be canceled, except for the presidential flight. Flights from Tainan and Kaohsiung would operate normally. A total of 67 flights were canceled, affecting over 20,000 passengers.

To assist affected travelers, China Airlines stated it would help them transfer to other flights and would issue $100 vouchers, encouraging passengers to contact customer service.

On the morning of June 24, Ho Nuan-hsuan became the new chairman of China Airlines. He stated he agreed to the union's condition to revert check-ins to Songshan Airport, restoring the terms from June 1, allowing negotiations to begin. At 2 p.m., Ho personally visited the strike site and agreed to all demands regarding check-in location, with flexibility on the remaining six demands. He assured that negotiations would be formalized in writing and that no retaliation would occur afterward. However, his remarks triggered dissatisfaction from flight attendants present, who shouted, "No result, no end!" and insisted that all six demands must be met or the protest would continue.

At 4 p.m., labor and management held negotiations at the Ministry of Labor, chaired by Minister Kuo Fang-yu, marking the first time a labor minister mediated such talks. Despite ongoing negotiations, the strike continued to impact operations. China Airlines announced the cancellation of two more flights after 10 p.m. The union, citing heavy rain, kept 100 members on-site while the rest returned home to wait for further instructions. That night, three more flights scheduled for June 25 were also canceled.

=== Explanation at Songshan Airport ===
In response to the June 23 cancellation of flights from Taoyuan and Songshan, the union spokesperson, Huang Hui-chen, criticized China Airlines for having enough personnel but deliberately inciting public anger and shifting the blame onto flight attendants. Therefore, on the morning of June 24, union members went to Songshan Airport to explain their reasons for striking and to seek public understanding.

About 30 union members distributed flyers at the airport. While some passengers expressed support, others complained angrily about the inconvenience. Union Vice Chair Chang Shu-yuan emphasized that the real issue was management's refusal to negotiate, not the strike itself.

=== Petition at DPP Headquarters ===
The union also criticized the Tsai Ing-wen administration for failing to stop what they saw as a series of unfair actions by China Airlines. Around 100 union members gathered in front of the Democratic Progressive Party (DPP) headquarters, directing specific questions at Transportation Minister Ho Chen Tan, Premier Lin Chuan, and Kaohsiung Mayor Chen Chu.

DPP Women's Department Director Tsai Wan-fen expressed support for the flight attendants' actions and pledged to convey their demands to the party leadership.

== Negotiation results ==
At 9 p.m. on June 24, after 4.5 hours of negotiation, Deputy Minister of Labor Kuo Kuo-wen announced that preliminary consensus had been reached on all seven union demands. However, the decision to end the strike was left to the union.

Kuo stated that negotiations went relatively smoothly with only occasional raised voices. On the issue of check-in location, China Airlines agreed to revert to Songshan and to restore the 80 minutes of rest time previously cut. Regarding Article 84-1 of the Labor Standards Act, the union would first deliberate and then formally submit its consensus. The longest discussion involved overseas allowances, which once reached an impasse. Ho Nuan-hsuan described the process as "like negotiating with a knife to the throat." Eventually, China Airlines agreed to raise the allowance from $2 to $5 USD. This would be implemented in stages: $4 starting July 1, 2016, and $5 by May 1, 2017, applicable only to union members, with a "no freeloaders" rule.

At 9:45 p.m., the union announced to members at the protest site that the strike was a success. Six demands were fully accepted, and the overseas allowance would be gradually increased. Regarding resuming work, the union explained that time was needed to return 1,700 passports and that many members were physically and mentally exhausted. They promised that flights departing after midnight on June 27 would operate normally. The protest blockade was lifted at 10:45 p.m.

== Impact and aftermath ==
Due to mishandling of labor relations, China Airlines Chairman Sun Hung-hsiang and General Manager Chang Yu-heng were replaced by Ho Nuan-hsuan and Hsieh Shih-chien, respectively.

The strike affected 266 tour groups and 5,261 individuals, either stranded abroad or unable to depart. The tourism industry estimated losses of NT$50 million and planned to seek compensation. More than 30,000 passengers in total were affected. Ground staff, bearing the brunt of customer complaints, also voiced grievances, with one staffer publicly criticizing management.

Due to the lenient fines under Taiwan's Labor Union Act, some union officials faced dismissal during the strike. In response, the New Power Party proposed increasing the maximum fine for union suppression to NT$1.5 million.

On June 25, the China Airlines Enterprise Union held a press conference, accusing the company of favoring flight attendants and ignoring the rights of other employees. They demanded equal benefits for all and threatened to launch a company-wide strike if their demands were not met, although they pledged to give at least seven days' notice in consideration of passengers. Ho Nuan-hsuan stated that all employees would be treated equally but noted that ground staff did not receive overseas allowances. Talks with the enterprise union were scheduled for the following week.

Although the seven union demands would increase annual operating costs by NT$200 million, Ho believed the company could absorb the cost without raising ticket prices.

Chang Yu-heng warned that state-owned enterprises like the Kaohsiung MRT and Taiwan Railways might follow suit. He also acknowledged that China Airlines might not return to profitability due to the strike.

On June 27, the Legislative Yuan's Transportation Committee passed a resolution requesting the Ministry of Transportation to seek legal accountability and compensation from former executives Sun Hung-hsiang and Chang Yu-heng. According to China Airlines, the strike led to an estimated NT$300 million revenue loss and NT$200 million in compensation costs, totaling around NT$500 million. Additionally, fulfilling the union's demands was projected to increase annual expenses by NT$550 million.
