= 2024 Boeing machinists' strike =

Labor strike in the United States

- Date: September 13, 2024 – November 4, 2024
- Location: Seattle, Portland, Southern California
- Caused by: Rejection of Boeing contract
- Goals: Improved wages and benefits
- Methods: Marching; Strike action; Picketing
- Result: Strike ends with a new contract, Boeing loses at least $9.66 billion

Parties
International Association of Machinists and Aerospace Workers District 751	Boeing

The 2024 Boeing machinists' strike was a labor strike by more than 33,000 machinists employed by aerospace giant Boeing from September to November 2024. It was the first strike by the International Association of Machinists and Aerospace Workers (IAM) at Boeing since the 2008 strike. Most of the striking workers were at the company's plants in Everett and Renton in the Seattle metropolitan area.

== Background ==
The strike began on September 13 after 94.6% of workers voted to reject a contract promising a 25% pay raise over four years, and 96% voted to approve the strike, surpassing the two-thirds threshold. The strike temporarily halted production of Boeing's 737, 777, and 767 jets, including military derivatives such as the U.S. Air Force KC-46 tanker and Navy P-8 maritime aircraft.

== Timeline ==
=== October ===
By early October, the strike had cost Boeing an estimated $5 billion. Negotiations broke down on October 8, with Boeing Commercial Airplanes President and CEO Stephanie Pope stating that the union "made non-negotiable demands far in excess of what can be accepted if we are to remain competitive as a business." On October 10, Boeing filed an unfair labor practice charge against the union with the National Labor Relations Board, accusing it of failing to bargain in good faith. On October 14, Boeing announced layoffs affecting thousands of workers. On October 31, the union backed a new contract that included a 38% wage increase over four years, plus a choice between a $12,000 ratification bonus or a combination of a $7,000 bonus and a $5,000 401(k) contribution.

=== November ===
On November 4, union members voted to approve the contract with 59% support, officially ending the strike.

== See also ==
- 2008 Boeing machinists strike
- 2025 Boeing machinists' strike
