= Henry Duffy =

American pilot, president of the Air Line Pilots Association (ALPA)

Henry A Duffy
- Born: 1934 (age 91–92)
- Known for: President of the Air Line Pilots Association

Henry A. Duffy (born 1934) is an American pilot who served as president of the Air Line Pilots Association (ALPA) from 1983 to 1990.

== Career ==
Henry A. Duffy began his career in 1962 as a pilot for Delta Air Lines, later serving as the Chairman of the Delta Master Executive Council (MEC) and the Delta Pilots Representative to ALPA. In November 1982, he was elected as President of the Air Line Pilots Association (ALPA), and served from 1983 to 1990. He was succeeded by Randy Babbitt, who was later appointed as Administrator of the FAA.

Duffy's election as President of ALPA was politically complex, following a decision by the previous incumbent, J.J. O'Donnell, not to run for re-election after the bankruptcy of Braniff International Airways, and was detailed in the book, Flying the Line, Volume II. Duffy gave a keynote speech at the 1983 AFL-CIO National Convention, and was first interviewed on the national stage on the Larry King show on December 19,1983.

During his tenure as President of ALPA, he represented 50,000 commercial airline pilots, and was instrumental in the development of comprehensive collective bargaining agreements for airline pilots, preventing the implementation of a lower second tier of pilots, with corresponding lower pay and more restrictive work rules, and resolving the Eastern Airlines strike of 1989.

Duffy's tenure occurred during a challenging period for ALPA as a result of the federal deregulation of the airline industry in 1978. Following frontal assaults on the industry by Frank Lorenzo, cited by the Chicago Tribune as 1985's "most intriguing, and perhaps important, labor-management conflicts", ALPA's efforts under Duffy's leadership assisted in Lorenzo being discredited and driven from the industry. Duffy, by solidifying the power of collective bargaining while making certain concessions on behalf of the pilots, was credited with saving the basic fabric and security of the airline industry.

Consequently, in a July, 1985, interview with the New York Times, Duffy gave credit to ALPA efforts for saving the "corporate lives" of Eastern, Republic, and Western airlines. Duffy was described in the article as a "pilot's pilot", and the "driving force - indeed the mastermind" behind ALPA's accomplishments in "shaping the nation's airline industry".

Duffy served as the chief U.S. delegate to the International Federation of Air Line Pilots' Associations, a 64-nation organization representing commercial airline pilots. He also served on the executive board of the Maritime Trades Department, AFL–CIO, and was a member of the Services Policy Advisory Committee in the Office of the U.S. Trade Representative. In 1987, President Ronald Reagan appointed Mr. Duffy as a member of the National Commission for Employment Policy.

He appeared in several C-SPAN videos while testifying before Senate committee hearings regarding collective bargaining (March 17, 1989), the Eastern Airlines strike in 1989 (March 7, 1989), and the replacement of striking workers (June 6, 1990).

== Personal life ==
Originally from Norfolk, Virginia, he obtained his Bachelor's degree in accounting from the University of Miami.
