= Society of Professional Engineering Employees in Aerospace =

American aerospace industry labor union

The Society of Professional Engineering Employees in Aerospace (SPEEA), IFPTE Local 2001 is a professional labor union representing more than 24,000 engineers, technical workers and other professionals in the aerospace industry. SPEEA represents employees at The Boeing Company, Spirit AeroSystems, BAE Systems and Triumph Composite Systems. Members work in Washington, Kansas, Oregon, Utah, Texas, California, and Florida.

SPEEA is governed by an elected Executive Board and Council, but daily operations are handled by a professional staff and Executive Director. Union headquarters are in Seattle, with branch offices and union halls in Everett, Washington and Wichita, Kansas.

== History ==
According to Richard Henning, SPEEA's co-founder and engineer, SPEEA's earliest beginnings were meetings at the Seattle YMCA in 1945 to frame its first constitution.

SPEEA was formed in 1946 by a group of Boeing engineers in Seattle, Washington and is an affiliated local union of the International Federation of Professional and Technical Engineers (IFPTE). On behalf of its members, SPEEA negotiates contracts with employers; it also provides assistance with resolving workplace and benefit issues. SPEEA originally stood for Seattle Professional Engineering Employees Association.

In an interview in February 2015, the centenarian co-founder Richard Henning, who retired in 1979 as a Boeing Executive remarked,

“It’s a smart idea to have an organization speak for an individual instead of one on one. In the old days, if you sat down to negotiate with the chief of engineering it was pretty difficult to express ideas. Whereas in a union, there was discussion to bring out points and that happened on a daily basis.”

In August 2026, approximately 17,000 members of the Society of Professional Engineering Employees Association overwhelmingly rejected a proposed contract from Boeing.
