= 1981 Professional Air Traffic Controllers Organization strike =

Failed U.S. air traffic controllers strike in 1981

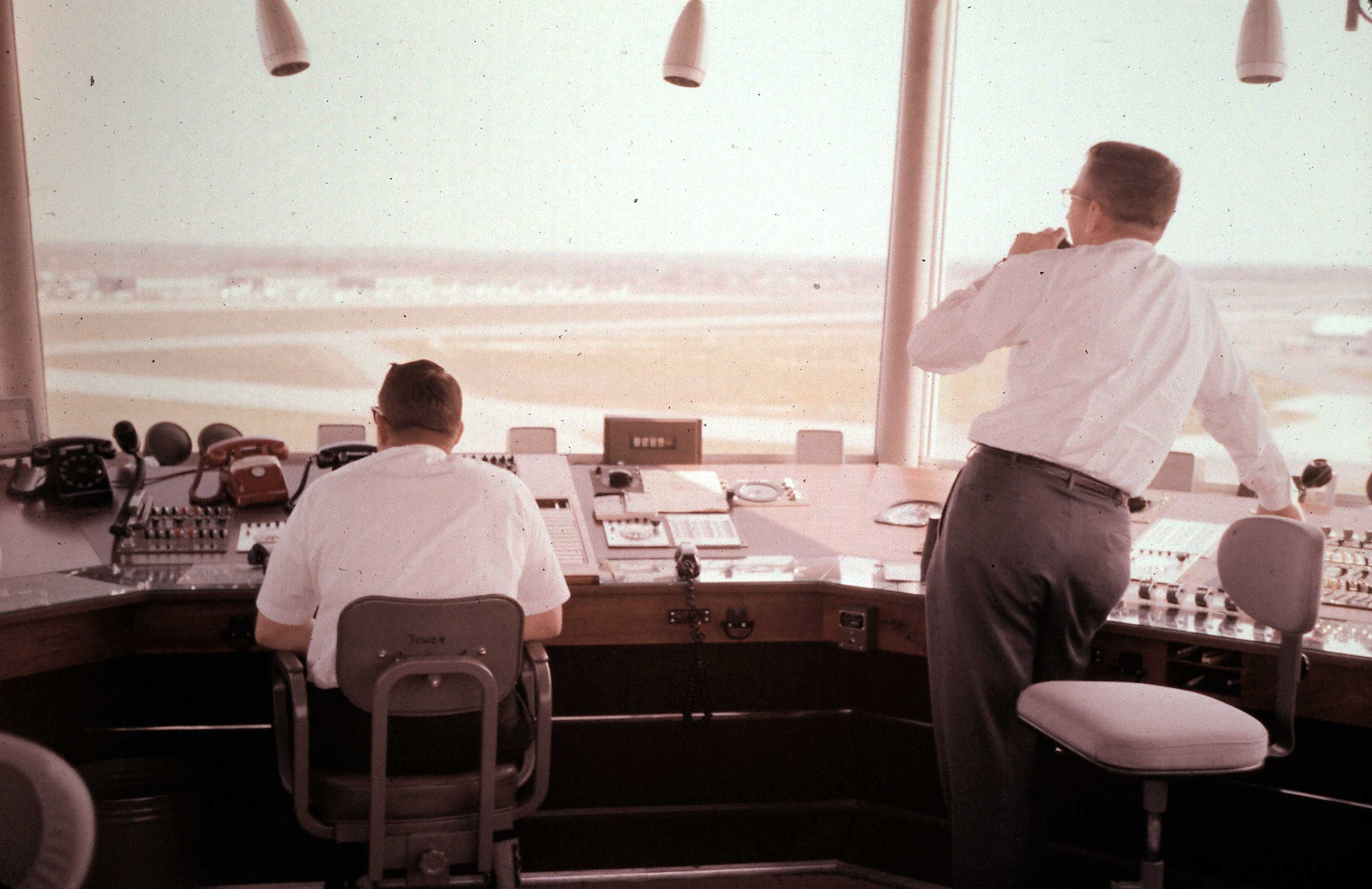
Air traffic controllers working in a control tower, showing the typical environment and equipment used before the 1981 PATCO strike.

The PATCO Strike of 1981 was a union-organized work stoppage by air traffic controllers (ATCs) in the United States. The Professional Air Traffic Controllers Organization (PATCO) declared a strike on August 3, 1981, after years of tension between controllers and the federal government over long hours, chronic understaffing, outdated equipment, and rising workplace stress. Despite 13,000 ATCs striking, the strike ultimately failed, as the Reagan administration was able to replace the striking ATCs, resulting in PATCO's decertification.

The failure of the PATCO strike impacted the American labor movement, accelerating the decline in labor unions in the country, and initiating a much more aggressive anti-union policy by the federal government and private sector employers.

== Background ==
The decades leading up to the PATCO strike saw reform within American labor unions, with country-wide unionization rates peaking at 35% in 1954. In the late 1960s, corrupt union leaders were forced out and replaced by younger leaders, often motivated by Vietnam veterans with strong anti-authority positions. The strikes and boycotts organized by these reformed unions were successful in achieving new laws for safety and labor, such as the Black Lung Benefits Act of 1972.

The background of PATCO consisted of years and years of tension between the air traffic controllers and the federal government. The government often required a stressful working environment, which consisted of demanding and long hours, and harsh working conditions. Additionally, there were constant staffing issues that resulted in long hours of high stress. Frustration rose as many repeated attempts to address the issues were ignored. On top of this, there were concerns about outdated equipment and workplace exhaustion. This was a direct threat, not only to worker safety but aviation safety. Into the 1970s, PATCO's relationship with the government and federal agencies had reached a dead end. On top of this, there were many staffing concerns, and public sector relations as a whole were at an all-time low. Additionally, around the same time, the nation's aviation system was extremely overstrained. Complaints of understaffing, as well as outdated infrastructure and equipment, drove the aviation industry to its breaking point. Increasing pressures from political and organizational groups created conditions that ultimately led to the 1981 PATCO strike.

The increased popularity of air travel in the 1970s placed a burden on the ATC community, causing long hours, higher stress, and overall discomfort within the workplace. The successful labor movements of the 1960s and 70s inspired PATCO to go on strike in an attempt to reduce stress in the workplace. Many of the workers were veterans of the Air Force, as well as Republican voters who had backed Ronald Reagan's presidential campaign, so they believed that a strike would be supported and ultimately be successful.

President Reagan making remarks on the strike from the White House Rose Garden, August 3, 1981.

The PATCO strike of 1981 was important to American labor relations. This strike illuminated the problems faced by air traffic controllers and the growing animosity between organized labor and the federal government. Stress at work and a desire for better working conditions, such as fewer hours, more money, and increased worker safety, were the main reasons controllers chose to go on strike. The controllers' burnout became worse under the heavy workload brought on by increasing aviation traffic. Members of PATCO, many of whom were veterans of the armed forces with strong rebelliousness toward authority, had shown much of the support for the organization. Strikers were certain of their victory against the Federal Aviation Administration (FAA), but this confidence proved to be unfounded. President Ronald Reagan, from whom they expected reciprocal support, responded negatively to the strike. Despite his being a former President of the Screen Actors Guild, he opposed strikes as a tactic. He quickly ruled the strike unlawful and ordered the dismissal of more than 11,000 striking controllers.

== Preparation and strike ==
PATCO's original demands included a $10,000 pay increase across the board, a four-day work week, increased pension and disability benefits, and cost-of-living adjustments.

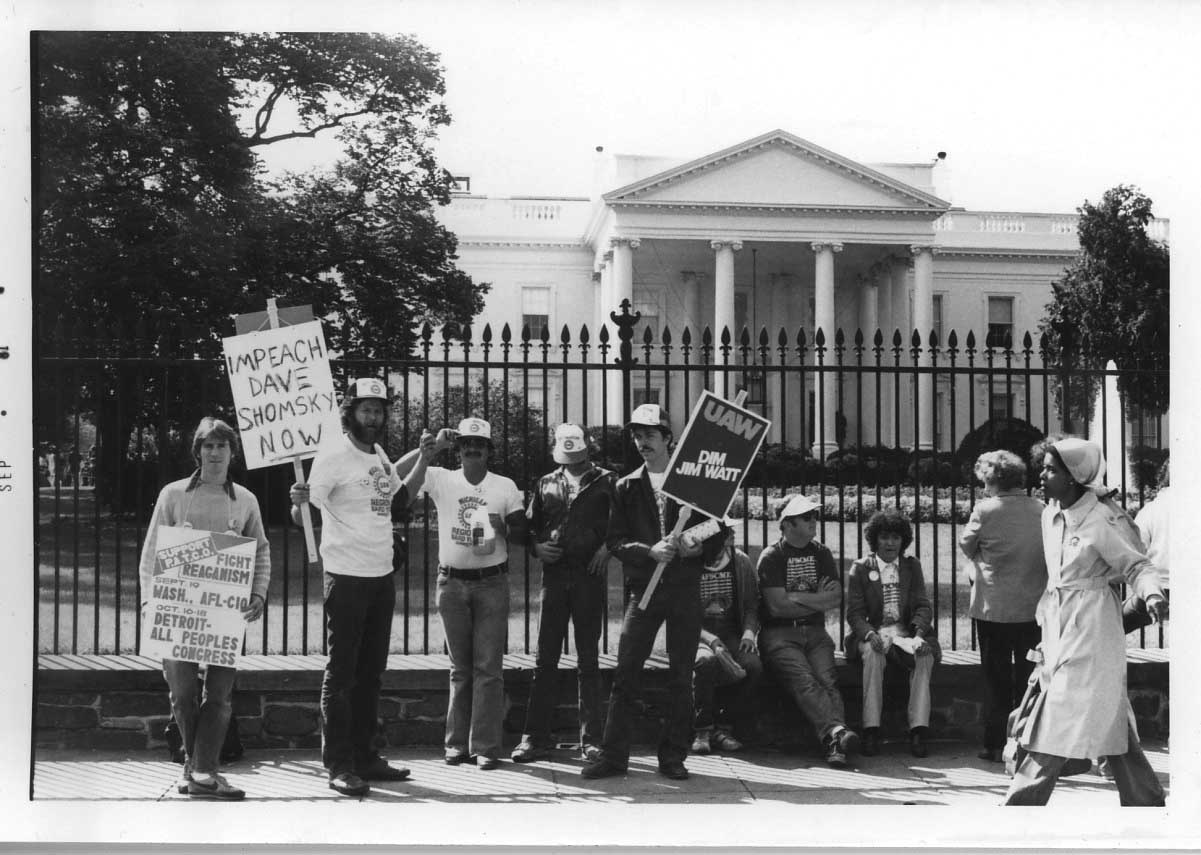
The American Federation of Labor and Congress of Industrial Organizations (AFL-CIO) at the Solidarity Day march in Washington, D.C., in September 1981.

On-the-job stress was seemingly thrown aside by the government and the general public. In some cases, employers saw that stress was just a "phenomenon" that only a few workers felt. Despite these claims, widespread stress among air traffic controllers was documented, and many workers reported significant psychological strain under heavy workloads. There was clear pressure on those who were air traffic controllers at the time. Over time the work caused them to seemingly break down psychologically the longer they continued to work. Even as PATCO and outside researchers raised concerns about controller fatigue and the risks it posed, federal officials continued to insist that the system was safe and resisted major structural reforms. As air traffic controllers would work, they would often become fatigued. Fatigue is often one of the symptoms of stress, but this feeling was pushed to the side as just another characteristic of the job by employers.

On August 3, 1981, over 13,000 ATCs went on strike. By the morning, the strike had stopped over 50% of flights; this number rose to 70% later in that day. Prior to the strike, former Secretary of Transportation Drew Lewis and former FAA Administrator Lynn Helms had prepared a contingency plan in preparation for such a strike. This contingency plan was immediately activated once the walkout began, relying on supervisors and military personnel to maintain limited operations. Two days into the strike, August 5, the Reagan administration gave the striking ATCs 48 hours to return to their jobs. After, only 875 union members returned to work following Reagan's request. Air traffic control towers were staffed by a mix of non-striking controllers, military controllers, and retired personnel who temporarily returned to service. Ultimately, the government action was effective at defeating the union. Only 1,300 of the striking workers were able to retain their jobs, and none of them attained their demands. The strike lasted 3 days and ended on August 5.

== Aftermath ==
The failure of the PATCO strike reshaped the American labor movement. Unionization within the U.S. steadily declined, from 20.9% in 1981 to 10% in 2024. The strike encouraged employers, with the backing of the federal government, to wield the threat of permanent replacement as a strikebreaking weapon. Consequently, labor unions grew more hesitant about going out on strike, and employers grew bolder.

Labor historian Joseph McCartin writes that before the PATCO strike, permanent replacements were used in roughly one out of every 70–80 major work stoppages. "In the first ten years after 1981, employers used permanent replacements in roughly one out of seven major work stoppages." As an example, he cites the 1983 dispute between Phelps Dodge Corporation, a copper-mining and smelting company, and its Arizona miners. In the past, each side would eventually agree on a new contract after the unionized miners went on strike. But in 1983, as soon as the miners struck, Phelps Dodge brought in 1,300 permanent replacements, protected by the Arizona National Guard, so that the mines could continue to operate. The replacement workers voted to decertify the union, "completing the destruction of collective bargaining in the copper mines." McCartin quotes the Phelps Dodge president who said that after PATCO, "Suddenly people realized, Hell, you can beat a union."

On the twenty-fifth anniversary of the PATCO strike, the New Labor Forum published an article that looked back on the walkout, and examined why it failed. Among the reasons listed was a lack of public relations material from the air traffic controllers to sway the general public in their favor. By contrast, the Federal Aviation Administration (FAA), according to labor sociologist Art Shostak, had "one of the biggest propaganda machines outside the Kremlin." The FAA leveraged its connections with news outlets to frame the strike as unlawful and a threat to ordinary Americans, claiming PATCO's contract demands would result in higher inflation. President Reagan also acted on the side of the FAA, criticizing PATCO workers for "abandoning their posts". Without meaningful countermeasures from PATCO, the federal government was able to shape public opinion, presenting the strike as both illegal and impractical.

The long-term impact of the PATCO strike was a decline in strike activity across the United States. After 1981, the number of major strikes fell. The average number of strikes in the late 1970s was 382, which then declined to less than 150 strikes per year by the mid-1980s. This dip in numbers showed the fear among unions of replacement and also the attitude of employers, who were often backed by government, and were more capable of avoiding union demands. Federal and state authorities, including the Department of Labor, sometimes supported employer strategies, reinforcing the perception among unions that strikes could be legally and politically suppressed. While strike activity remained low through the 1980s and 1990s, an increase occurred in the 2000s and 2010s, particularly among public-sector workers which suggests that union strength slowly recovered after decades of limitation.
