= Air Line Pilots Association, International =

North American trade union

- Abbreviation: ALPA; US-ALPA
- Formation: 27 July 1931; 95 years ago
- Type: Trade union
- Headquarters: McLean, Virginia, US
- Locations: Canada; United States
- Members: 79,000+
- President: Jason Ambrosi
- Affiliations: AFL–CIO; Canadian Labour Congress; International Federation of Air Line Pilots' Associations
- Website: www.alpa.org

The Air Line Pilots Association, International (ALPA) is the largest pilot union in the world, representing more than 80,000 pilots from 42 American and Canadian airlines. ALPA was founded on 27 July 1931 and is a member of the AFL-CIO and the Canadian Labour Congress. Known internationally as US-ALPA, ALPA is also a member of the IFALPA.

The association has been a staunch proponent of the "1,500-hour rule", which requires pilots for commercial airlines to log 1,500 hours of flying before they can obtain their license, which is vastly higher than the rules in other countries and has substantially increased the costs and time for prospective pilots to obtain certification.

== History ==
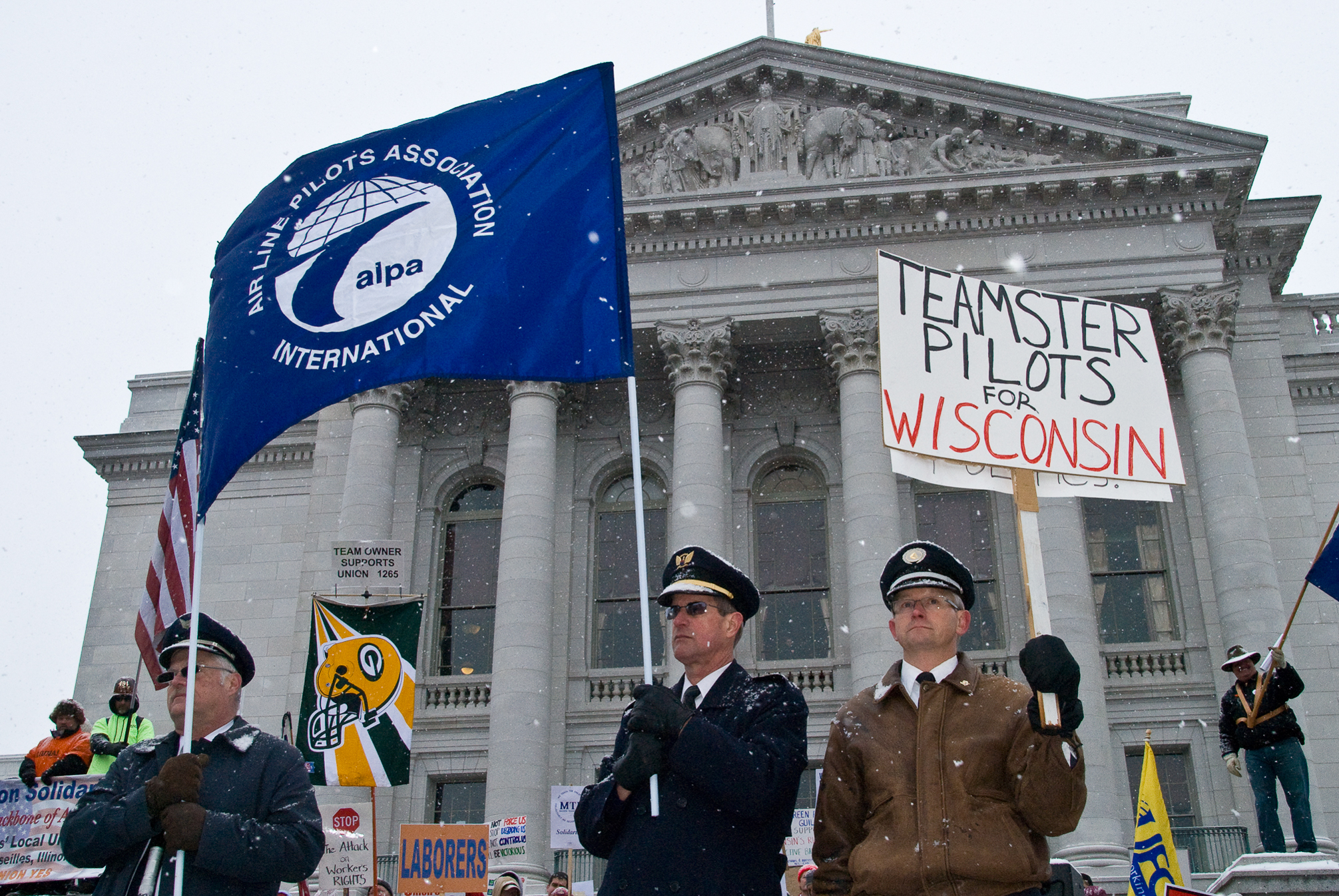
ALPA protesters demonstrating during the 2011 Wisconsin protests

ALPA was founded by David L. Behncke and 23 other key figures in Chicago, Illinois, on July 27, 1931. In the 1930s, flying was a perilous occupation; thus, from the time of its formation, one of ALPA's main goals was to improve air safety.

In 1934, the decision by the National Labor Board to limit the flight time for pilots and co-pilots to 85 hours a month was the result of the union's first major lobbying campaign to make the skies safer. By the end of the 1930s, the association had persuaded numerous airlines to form air traffic control centers and had started the Airworthiness and Performance Committee, the first ALPA technical committee dedicated to improving flight safety.

In the 1940s, numerous ALPA pilots enlisted in the military to help the United States battle the Axis powers during World War II. In this decade, ALPA created additional air safety committees, and the newly established International Federation of Air Line Pilots' Associations (IFALPA) worked to improve flight safety around the world.

In 1951, ALPA created an internal air safety system, which developed into the world's biggest independent, nongovernmental safety structure. During the 1950s, jet travel was introduced, marking a new period for the air industry. In this era, crew fatigue became a greater concern for pilots, with the union successfully persuading the Civil Aeronautics Board to stop airlines from scheduling impractical flights.

During the 1960s, jet transport of people and goods became commonplace, with ALPA addressing the new safety issues that came with this type of travel. In 1961, ALPA's second president, Clarence N. Sayen, directly asked new US President John F. Kennedy to make hijacking a federal crime, which subsequently became the law of the land in September of that year. The Southern Airways strike of 1960–62, a conflict that ALPA winningly took on in a dispute over pilot wages, is the longest walkout in the union's history. For years, ALPA had lobbied hard for the creation of an independent government agency that would investigate accidents, and in 1967, the National Transportation Safety Board was established to conduct such investigations.

In 1972, ALPA began an anti-skyjacking lobby offensive, among other efforts to fight air terrorism. Also in 1972, after decades of campaigning by ALPA, the Federal Aviation Administration (FAA) established an airport certification program, which required airport operators to prove they are following safety standards. In 1976, the union's dedicated work resulted in NASA creating the Aviation Safety Reporting System (ASRS), a database of confidential incident reports.

During the 1980s, ALPA accomplished much in the way of safety. In 1981, among other achievements, the Association convinced the FAA that “fasten seatbelt” signs were needed, and in 1987, the FAA again heeded calls from the union, requiring the installation of a traffic collision avoidance system (TCAS) in every airplane. On March 4, 1989, ALPA pilots at Eastern Airlines went on strike in support of the International Association of Machinists. The pilots stood their ground for 285 days.

Following the 1994 crash of USAir Flight 427, in which all 132 people on board were killed, the National Transportation Safety Board ruled that pilot error was the cause. But ALPA fought that decision, and in the end, it was found that a malfunction in the rudder control system of the B-737 plane was likely the cause. Subsequently, a redesign of all B-737s—the most commonly flown commercial airplane—was ordered by the FAA. After another tragic 1994 crash, of American Eagle Flight 4184, a study of icing issues with the ATR 72 commenced, an inquiry ALPA was closely involved with. The outcomes were alterations in the design of the ATR 72 and improved pilot training. ALPA's chief accomplishment of the 1990s was the 1995 enactment of the “One Level of Safety” program by the FAA, resulting in stricter safety rules for smaller airplanes. ALPA came up with the name for the program and lobbied hard for the measure.

In 1997, the Canadian Airline Pilots Association (CALPA) merged with ALPA, forming what would become known as ALPA Canada. As of 2024, ALPA Canada represents more than 10,600 pilots.

In 2000, after years of advocacy by the association, the FAA approved ALPA's recommendations for Land and Hold Short Operations (LAHSO).

During the 2010s, ALPA successfully lobbied to make pointing lasers at pilots in the air a federal crime.

In 2020, amidst the COVID-19 outbreak, ALPA pressed the US government for favorable provisions in the CARES Act for the aviation industry.

ALPA has lobbied against attempts to rescind the "1,500-hour rule", which requires that pilots for commercial airlines must log 1,500 hours of flying before they can get their ATP Certificate. The 1,500-hour rule was implemented in 2013, raising the required flight training hours from 250 to 1,500. Critics of the rule say it is arbitrary and not based on scientific data, as well as raises the costs and time for prospective pilots to obtain certification. The rule has been attributed as a factor in explaining a shortage of pilots in the United States. Most countries, including the European Union, require 250 hours for pilot certification.

ALPA has also fought to oppose a reduction in the required number of flight crew members on commercial airliners. In early 2023, ALPA launched its “Safety Starts with Two” campaign, joining forces with the European Cockpit Association, the International Federation of Air Line Pilots' Associations, the Associations of Star Alliance Pilots, the Oneworld Cockpit Crew Coalition, and the SkyTeam Pilots Association to promote awareness about the dangers of various reduced-crew schemes proposed by some operators and manufacturers. ALPA’s president, Capt. Jason Ambrosi, has called attempts to implement reduced-crew operations one of greatest threats to aviation safety, emphasizing that the most important safety element on every commercial airliner is the presence of two highly trained, experienced, and well-rested pilots.

In July 2023, after four years of negotiations, a new labor deal was struck for United Airlines pilots, valued at $10 billion over the contract life. The pilots received up to a 40% raise. In September 2024, a strike was averted with Air Canada pilots after a new labor deal was struck which was valued at $1.9 billion over a four-year contract life. The pilots are to receive up to a 46% raise.

== Leadership ==
ALPA's four international officers were elected by the union's Board of Directors on Oct. 19, 2022, and began their four-year terms on Jan. 1, 2023.

Jason Ambrosi, Delta Air Lines, is ALPA's twelfth president. He previously served as chair of the Delta pilots’ Master Executive Council. While employed by a charter airline, Ambrosi was a strong supporter of labor representation and helped create a culture of safety.

Wendy Morse, United Airlines, is ALPA's first vice president and national safety coordinator. At United, Morse served as Master Executive Council chair and held many other positions of leadership.

Justin “Tyler” Hawkins, United Airlines, is ALPA’s vice president-administration/secretary. Hawkins held the same position at Frontier Airlines. At Frontier, he was also on the Master Executive Council and served as the chair of the MEC’s Strategic Preparedness and Strike Committee.

Wes Clapper, JetBlue, is ALPA's vice president–finance/treasurer. Clapper previously served in several leadership roles at JetBlue, and recently was the Group A executive vice president for the union.

=== Former presidents ===
The following is a complete list of ALPA's former presidents since the Association's founding in 1931:

- David L. Behncke (1931–1951)
- Clarence N. Sayen (1951–1962)
- Charles H. Ruby (1962–1970)
- John J. O'Donnell (1971–1982)
- Henry Duffy (1983–1990)
- J. Randolph Babbitt (1991–1998)
- Duane E. Woerth (1999–2006)
- John Prater (2007–2010)
- Lee Moak (2011–2014)
- Tim Canoll (2015–2018)
- Joe DePete (2019–2022)

== Archives ==
The Walter P. Reuther Library at Wayne State University is home to over 50 collections of archival material documenting the history of the Air Line Pilots Association. To access the collections' finding aids, search for ALPA-related content via ArchivesSpace@Wayne.

== Member pilot groups ==
ALPA represents the following bargaining units:

- Air Canada
- Air Inuit
- Air Transat
- Air Transport International
- Air Wisconsin Airlines
- Alaska Airlines
- Amerijet International
- Breeze Airways
- Calm Air
- Canadian North
- Cargojet
- CommuteAir
- Delta Air Lines
- Endeavor Air
- Envoy Air
- FedEx Express
- Flair Airlines
- Frontier Airlines
- Hawaiian Airlines
- Jazz
- JetBlue Airways
- Kalitta Air
- Keewatin Air
- Kelowna Flightcraft Ltd.
- Mesa Air Group
- Morningstar Air Express Inc.
- PAL Aerospace
- PAL Airlines and Air Borealis
- Pascan Aviation
- Perimeter Aviation
- Piedmont Airlines
- Pivot Airlines
- Porter Airlines
- PSA Airlines
- Spirit Airlines
- Sun Country Airlines
- Sunwing Airlines
- United Airlines
- Wasaya
- Western Global
- WestJet
- WestJet Encore
