= 1985 United Airlines strike =

Labor dispute between pilots and United Airlines

- Date: May 17 – June 15, 1985
- Location: United States
- Caused by: United Airlines management's plan to implent a two-tier system for pilot salaries

Parties
United Airlines	Air Line Pilots Association, International; Association of Flight Attendants	Government of the United States: National Mediation Board; United States District Court for the Northern District of Illinois

Lead figures
Richard J. Ferris (CEO)	

The 1985 United Airlines strike was a 29-day strike by United Airlines pilots in mid-1985. Occurring amidst the airline deregulation of the 1980s, the strike was sparked by a dispute between United pilots and management over implementation of a two-tier system for pilot salaries, with pilots demanding a less unequal two-tier system than United management demanded. Over the course of the strike, further disputes would emerge over United management's tactic of using strikebreaking pilots to try and overcome the strike.

== Background ==
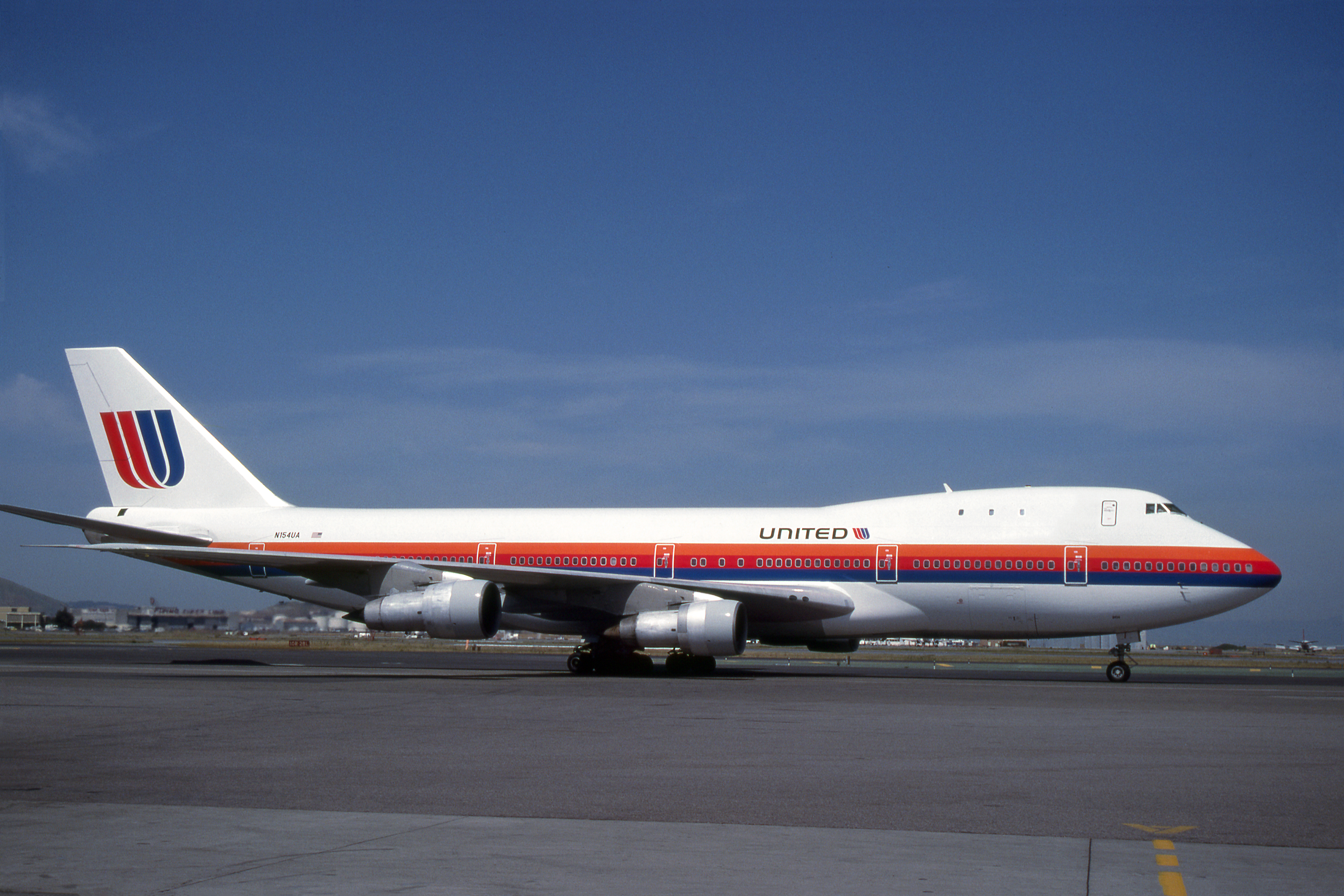
A United Airlines Boeing 747 in 1985

United Airlines was one of the major airlines of the United States, headquartered at O'Hare International Airport in Chicago, Illinois. A subsidiary of the UAL Corporation, the airline had been led by CEO Richard J. Ferris since 1976. By 1985, United was the largest domestic airline in the country, with over 1500 flights every day, around 5000 pilots, and reporting a $259 million profit in 1984. United pilots were represented in labour relations by the Air Line Pilots Association, International (ALPA), while United flight attendants were represented by the Association of Flight Attendants (AFA).

In 1978, the Airline Deregulation Act came into force in the United States, removing a wide range of federal government controls over the airline industry in the country, including over farse, routes, and the creation of new airlines. As CEO of United, Ferris had been one of the most prominent advocates of deregulation among airline industry executives. Deregulation led to significantly increased competition between airlines, with the industry further being disturbed by the early 1980s recession and the 1981 Professional Air Traffic Controllers Organization strike. These factors in turn led to a surge in labour disputes between airline managements and workers, as managements moved aggressively to rollback wages and benefits and to lower costs. However, according to David J. Walsh of Miami University, "in general, airline unions did not fare well in strikes during the 1980s. In contrast to the period before deregulation, carriers usually attempted to operate during strikes and sometimes actively provoked them. Permanent replacements were frequently threatened and sometimes used. A key factor affecting the outcomes of strikes was the degree of interunion support available."

Under American law, labour relations in the airline industry were regulated by the Railway Labor Act. The Act, first enacted in the 1920s, emphasised bargaining and arbitration in labour disputes, while minimising strike action, with the goal of preventing disruption to nationally-important transportation. Notably, the Act enforced a bargaining process between unions and management followed 30-day cooling-off period following the failure of the process, during which unions were no allowed to begin strike action. As well, unions could only strike over disputes deemed to be major disputes, there were less restrictions on unions' ability to take secondary boycotts, and management was less restricted on unfair labor practice (including being allowed to permanently hire strikebreakers).

== Events ==
=== Prelude ===
During the early 1980s, United's management under Ferris joined other airlines in the United States in taking aggressive action to cut wages and benefits for its workers. This notably included convincing several of its trade unions (including machinists and flight attendants) to agree to two-tier systems for salaries, where newly-hired employees would be paid on a significantly lower pay scale than the one that current employees followed. In 1984, management convinced almost 3000 of its current employees to retire early, so that they could be replaced by new employees on that lower scale.

On 14 April 1984, the collective bargaining agreement between United pilots and the company expired, setting the stage for a labour dispute. United's management's demand to implement the two-tier system for pilots would emerge as the key issue in the dispute. In the proposed two-tier system, newly-hired pilots would be paid between one-third and half less than currently-hired pilots. The new hires would only become eligible to be upgraded to the higher pay scale once they were promoted to captain, a process that could take as long as 20 years. The union, on the other hand, reluctantly accepted the implementation of a two-tier system, but demanded that it be less strict, proposing a modified two-tier system in which the newly-hired pilots would be paid a maximum of one-quarter less and would be upgraded to the higher scale after six years.

Pilots and their union, ALPA, opposed United's management's demands for a number of reasons. On the one hand, they argued that it was unfair that newly-hired pilots would be paid on a much lower scale while still performing the same duties and responsibilities as existing pilots. On the other hand, they argued that it would also incentivise the company to try and induce existing pilots to quit so that they could be replaced by cheaper new hires. Pilots argued that these would have the effect of sowing divisions among them, impacting trust and cooperation between pilots, and potentially affecting pilot performance and flight safety. Pilots also warned that management would use divisions between pilots to try and undermine their union and their collective bargaining power.

Ferris argued that management's demands were necessary to ensure United's long-term survival during "a shakeout of the carriers" sparked by deregulation. United's management's also warned that it was prepared to take drastic steps in the event of any strike, including hiring large numbers of strikebreaking pilots on permanent contracts to replace pilots on strike. These tactics were informed in part by the success of other airlines in defeating unions in other labour disputes in the early 1980s, including the 1983–85 Continental Airlines strikes and the 1985 Pan Am strike. Ferris told the press that, if there was a strike, "we will close down the airline and hire permanent replacements. The short-term pain is worth insuring our long-term health."

=== 30-day cooling-off period ===
On 16 April, the 30-day cooling-off period under the Railway Labor Act began.

In late April, United pilots voted in favour of strike action beginning on 17 May. Roger Hall, the chair of ALPA's United branch, told the press that "the company`s final offer to us is the kind that gives even corporate greed a bad name."

In the following days, UAL would hold its shareholders' annual general meeting. At the AGM, United reported a $3.2 million loss during the first fiscal quarter of 1985, attributing it to competition between airlines over ticket prices. Late April also saw United acquire Pan Am's entire Pacific Division in a $750 million deal. As the end of the cooling-off period drew nearer, United sent letters to its frequent flyers assuring them that a strike "will not affect you as seriously as you might imagine," pledging to provide frequent flyers additional services during a strike and airplane miles if they had to rebook flights with other carriers.

On 13 May, management and the union met for the first time in a month, in talks held in Boston and overseen by the National Mediation Board. The last-minute talks failed to reach an agreement.

=== Strike begins ===
On 17 May 1985, United pilots walked off the job, launching strike action. The first picket line of the strike was established at O'Hare International, United's main hub and headquarters, early in the morning. The pilots who walked off the job at airports elsewhere than O'Hare refused to fly the United planes back to O'Hare. It marked the first time that United pilots had gone on strike since 1951.

The same day, the AFA announced that United flight attendants would be joining the pilots, launching a sympathy strike.

United communications manager Chuck Novak told the press that the airline management would be launching its contingency plans to deal with the strike, including pressing almost 300 pilots who were working in management back into flying and immediately hiring several hundred pilots-in-training who could fly the airline's Boeing 727s. Novak also said that the company believed it could quickly hire hundreds already-qualified pilots to work and that it would schedule any strikebreaking pilots to work longer hours than the company's usual pre-strike scheduling.

Around 90% of United flights were cancelled as the strike began. Other airlines in the United States also instituted contingency plans to deal with an expected increase in demand during the strike. Frontier Airlines hired 100 new workers and added flights to new destinations.

=== Strike ===
Of the around 500 trainee pilots who management had hoped to use as strikebreakers, only four crossed the picket line, surprising the management.

On Friday 24 May, National Mediation Board chair Helen Witt announced that a tentative agreement between the pilots and management had been reached over the two-tier system. However, further negotiations in the following days soon reached an impasse over the issue of strikebreaking pilots. United management demanded that strikebreaking pilots retain pay and seniority increases that the company awarded them for strikebreaking and that trainee pilots who refused to cross the picket line and were consequently fired would not be re-hired. The unions, on the other hand, demanded that those trainee pilots be reinstated and that seniority slots be reverted to the pilots who had gone on strike.

As the month of May drew to an end and the strike reached the end of its second week, with the airline managing to maintain only around 15% of its pre-strike flights, both United management and the striking pilots dug in. At a nationwide teleconference at the Odeum Expo Center, ALPA spokesperson John Mazor told pilots that "United has shifted the purpose and nature of the strike from economics to one of preservation of basic union concepts." Ferris, on the other hand, stated that the pilots were still making demands that the company would refuse to negotiate over, notably hiring pilots-in-training who had been offered jobs when the strike but who refused to cross the picket line and that flight attendants not be penalised for their sympathy strike. He stated that those issues were outside of ALPA's jurisdiction and called for ALPA to "rethink its position."

As the strike continued, animosity began to grow between the pilots on strike and the strikebreaking pilots. The Chicago Tribune quoted strikebreaking pilot V.D. Cordle as saying that "I want to work for United Airlines very much. I want it so bad that I`m willing to risk some animosity in the cockpit." The Federal Aviation Administration reported several incidents where pilots of other airlines interfered with the radio communications of the strikebreaking pilots.

In early June, as the strike reached two-and-a-half weeks, United management claimed to have hired 148 new pilots since the beginning of the strike and that its plans to permanently replace the striking pilots was on schedule, saying that it still aimed to be back to its pre-strike flight numbers by early 1986.

=== End of strike ===
In mid-June, as the duration of the strike neared one month, ALPA announced that a tentative agreement had been reached between the pilots and management. ALPA, however, pledged to remain on strike until management also reached a back-to-work agreement with the flight attendants.

In the following days, the AFA would decide to return to work without an agreement, bringing at end to the strike after 29 days.

== Reactions ==
The strike had a particular effect on the state of Hawaii, as United was the main airline servicing the islands.

The Chicago Tribune wrote in an editorial after the end of the strike that "United`s battle with its pilots was not a struggle for economic relief," saying that it was "now clear that United`s goal in the strike was to destroy its employee organizations." William Serrin of The New York Times wrote that the strike "illustrates the stern resolve of a number of companies in the United States to attack unions... many companies are taking actions that would have been unthinkable a few years ago."

AFL-CIO Secretary-Treasurer Thomas R. Donahue described the strike as a "pure and simple effort to bust the union."

== Aftermath ==
When UAL posted its second fiscal quarter reports, the company reported that it had lost $91 million during the second quarter compared to a $123.1 million profit in the second quarter of 1984. The drop in profits was widely attributed to the strike, especially as it occurred as summer was beginning, which was usually a peak travel season.

In the weeks following the end of the strike, United management would host several banquets in honour of the pilots who had crossed the picket line.

The aftermath of the strike saw several lawsuits in the United States District Court for the Northern District of Illinois. One lawsuit, presided over by judge James Benton Parsons, was filed by the AFA, accusing United management of attempted intimidation by withholding benefits from flight attendants on strike.

In late July, judge Nicholas John Bua ruled on another lawsuit that United had to re-hire the 500 trainee pilots who had refused to cross the picket line during the strike. In his ruling, Bua stated that the company had previously considered trainee pilots to be employees, a practice that had only changed with the outbreak of the strike, and that having to re-hire the trainee pilots would not prevent United from hiring permanent replacements in future strikes. Bua also ruled that the company's practice of hiring strikebreaking pilots on a higher pay scale than the pilots was lawful, but that the company's plan to grant strikebreaking pilots "super-seniority" was unlawful, based on what could be reasonably deemed necessary to maintain the airline's operations during a strike. During the case, it was revealed that Ferris had said before the strike of the trainee pilots that, "if they don`t show up to work, they will never, ever, work for this airline, ever, because they`re not on the property, they won`t have a number, they don`t have anything."

== Replacement pilots and post-strike seniority disputes ==
=== The "Group of 570" ===
Beginning in the autumn of 1984, while contract negotiations with the Air Line Pilots Association (ALPA) were ongoing, United selected approximately 570 candidates for a newly created pilot training programme, intending to build a pool of trained pilots it could deploy without immediately paying the wages required under its existing pilot contract. Trainees signed agreements acknowledging they were not United employees during training and would receive $30 per day in expenses only.

After federal mediation between United and ALPA broke down in April 1985, United formally offered second-officer positions to members of this group effective 17 May 1985, the strike's first scheduled day, and informed them they would not be employed unless they reported to work that day. ALPA urged the trainees to honour its picket lines instead. Only 25 reported for work on 17 May 1985, and approximately six more shortly afterwards; the remainder did not cross.

ALPA sued on the trainees' behalf. After a ten-day trial, U.S. District Judge Nicholas J. Bua found that the trainees became United employees on 17 May 1985, and ordered United to grant them employee status and seniority as of that date. The U.S. Court of Appeals for the Seventh Circuit reversed this specific holding in September 1986, ruling that trainees who had performed no work for United did not meet the Railway Labor Act's definition of "employee". The Supreme Court denied certiorari in March 1987.

Following the Seventh Circuit's ruling, United proposed discharging the entire group unless ALPA agreed to a new seniority arrangement. On 3 April 1987, United and ALPA executed a letter of agreement extending employment offers to the group — subsequently and consistently referred to in company and union documents as "the 570" or the "Group of 570" — with seniority dated to 9 November 1985 (the date of the first recall under Judge Bua's order), placing them behind the strike-replacement pilots. ALPA agreed not to reopen the issue.

ALPA nonetheless continued pressing to restore the 570's original 17 May 1985 seniority date. Under a new collective bargaining agreement reached in 1991, United agreed to adjust the seniority and longevity of the 570, together with a smaller, separate group known as the "Class of 1985" (see below), to 17 May 1985, retroactively placing them ahead of the replacement pilots.

=== Fleet-qualified replacements and the "Group of 539" ===
Separately, before and during the strike, United recruited pilots already qualified to fly its aircraft at other airlines to serve as permanent replacements, advertising guaranteed annual salaries of $75,000 for captains and $50,000 for first officers regardless of the strike's outcome. Approximately 219 such "fleet-qualified" pilots were hired, with seniority dates between 17 May and 28 June 1985.

United also hired approximately 320 additional candidates as student pilots during the strike who were not yet qualified to fly its aircraft; these pilots began active service between 1 and 22 July 1985.

Together, these 539 replacement pilots became known in subsequent litigation, and in company and union documents, as the "Group of 539" or "the 539". Under the 1987 agreement, the 539 held seniority ahead of the 570; the 1991 agreement reversed this, placing the 570 and the Class of 1985 ahead of the 539 instead.

A group of 103 fleet-qualified pilots sued United and ALPA in 1991 to block the new seniority provision. The U.S. District Court for the Northern District of Illinois held that ALPA had breached its duty of fair representation toward the 539 by repeatedly lobbying, over several years, to reverse a seniority arrangement it had itself negotiated and agreed to in 1987, and issued a permanent injunction barring the 1991 seniority change from taking effect as to those plaintiffs. The court ruled in United's favour on the plaintiffs' remaining claims, finding no evidence that United had acted in bad faith.

=== The "Class of 1985" ===
A separate, much smaller group of approximately 15 pilots had been offered new-hire positions during the strike but declined them at the time. They were subsequently hired by United after the strike ended, receiving less favourable seniority dates than they would have received had they accepted the original strike-period offer. Because this group, like the 570, had not worked during the strike, it was included alongside the 570 rather than the 539 in the seniority adjustments negotiated from 1991 onwards.

== Legacy ==
Walsh wrote that the strike has been "widely pointed to as a rare successful strike in the aftermath of deregulation, although its 'success' was relative to the disastrous strikes that had preceded it... ALPA successfully resisted the carrier’s more extreme concession demands and demonstrated that it could engineer an effective strike. On the other hand, it still submitted to some concessions, including a two-tier wage structure, albeit one that merged new hire and previous hire pay scales much more quickly. Issues regarding treatment of the trainees were left for the courts to decide, and the strike was very costly to ALPA (estimated at $8 million–$10 million)."

Animosity between the pilots on strike and those who crossed the picket line continued after the end of the strike. Travel author Gary Leff wrote in 2020 that United's attempts to use strikebreakers during the strike "still engenders bitterness, thirty five years later." In 2025, on the 40th anniversary of the strike, Michael Batkins of ALPA wrote that "those wounds ran deep, and some of the scars still linger."

In 2023, the AFA described the strike as "one of the most notable displays of solidarity" between flight attendants and pilots in American airline labour history, while warning that "the tactics and practices employed in 1985 still loom in the shadows of today's management." Walsh has also noted "the strong support from the flight attendants... on this occasion the pilots recognized the symbolic value of labor unity and its ability to counter efforts to paint them as rich men in a squabble with other rich men. The pilots went further than usual in looking out for the interests of the flight attendants during the United strike, although in the end they settled before an acceptable back-to-work agreement was obtained by the Association of Flight Attendents (AFA)."

== See also ==
- History of United Airlines
- Timeline of strikes in 1985
