= 1984 Marval turkey strike =

1984 labor strike in Virginia

- Date: June 2 – August 2, 1984 (Note: Multiple sources give the start date of the strike as June 2, 1984. The end date is calculated based on a 2014 article by academic David C. Huffman, who said that the strike lasted 61 days.) (2 months)
- Location: Dayton, Virginia, United States
- Goals: Increased wages and improved working conditions
- Methods: Boycott; Picketing; Strike action
- Result: Strike ended without a new labor contract; Union later decertified in October 1984

Parties
United Food and Commercial Workers Local 400	Marval Poultry Company, Inc.

In June 1984, several hundred workers at a turkey processing plant owned by the Marval Poultry Company in Dayton, Virginia, United States, went on strike. Within two months, the company had replaced many of the striking workers and the labor union representing the workers, the United Food and Commercial Workers, told the strikers that they could return to work, bringing an end to the strike.

In the mid-1980s, the Marval plant was the largest turkey processing plant in the world, employing about 800 workers. The plant was organized by a local union of the United Food and Commercial Workers, Local 400, which for many years had enjoyed a good relationship with the company. However, following Marval's acquisition by Rocco, Inc. in 1981, the relationship began to sour. In 1984, the union and company began negotiating a new collective bargaining agreement but could not agree on terms regarding wages and working conditions. In June 1984, the union members voted to reject the company's new collective bargaining proposal and commenced striking on June 2.

The strike involved several hundred workers and featured picketing outside of the plant. Additionally, the union organized a boycott, initially local in scope, that eventually spread nationwide with the support of the AFL-CIO. The union filed unfair labor practice charges against the company, but these were dismissed by the National Labor Relations Board. Within a few weeks, the company had replaced most of the striking employees and renewed negotiations in mid-June were unproductive. In early August, the union informed strikers that they could return to work, though they continued with their boycott and sporadic picketing until late 1986. In mid-August 1984, a union decertification drive began at the plant that resulted in the union losing its status as the workers' bargaining unit in October. The union sued the company over this, but the case was dismissed in 1989.

== Background ==
In 1955, Marval Poultry Company, Inc. purchased a turkey processing plant in Dayton, Virginia, from the Spencer Produce Company. Several years later, in 1961, a predecessor of the United Food and Commercial Workers (UFCW), an affiliate labor union of the AFL-CIO, organized the plant under a local union, Local 400. (Note: In a 2014 article on the strike, academic David C. Huffman said that the United Food and Commercial Workers (UFCW) had organized the plant in 1961. However, the UFCW was formed in 1979, as a merger of the Amalgamated Meat Cutters and the Retail Clerks International Union.) While the company initially filed a complaint against the union with the National Labor Relations Board (NLRB), both sides enjoyed a relatively good relationship for the next several years. By 1984, the Dayton facility had become the world's largest turkey processing plant in the world. (Note: Attributed to multiple sources.) Per The Washington Post, the plant was producing about 200 million pounds (91 million kilograms) of turkey annually, equivalent to over 11 million turkeys. At the time, it employed about 800 workers. (Note: Sources vary on the number of workers at the Marval facility, including 780, 800, and 900. Per Peter Perl, a reporter for The Washington Post, the figure of 800 was given by Robert Wolfe, a spokesperson for Marval.) Statewide, the turkey industry generated about $250 million (equivalent to $775 million in 2025) per year, with The Washington Post calling Rockingham County, Virginia, the "Turkey Capital of the World". By this time, the Marval plant was one of only two unionized turkey processing plants in the Shenandoah Valley region, with the other, owned by the Shenandoah Valley Poultry Company, also being represented by the UFCW. UFCW Local 400, which was based in Landover, Maryland, represented about 30,000 members in total.

In January 1981, Rocco, Inc. purchased Marval, with the company's new owners being less willing to cooperate with the union than the previous ones. In May of that year, the company and union negotiated a new labor contract, with UFCW Vice President Bill Sellers saying that major points of contention in the negotiations included insurance and pay. However, Sellers was overall pleased with the agreement, calling it "a terrific contract". Around the same time, under the presidency of Ronald Reagan, there were several changes to the United States Department of Labor and the NLRB that made the organizations more pro-management in labor disputes, and additionally, public opinion towards unions had become less favorable over the early 1980s. According to David C. Huffman, a professor of economics at Bridgewater College, these changes may have encouraged the plant's owners to attempt to weaken the union. Between 1981 and 1984, the company reduced the plant's workforce and increased production, with the workforce shrinking from about 1,100 to 800. Beginning in April 1984, the company and union began to negotiate the terms of a new labor contract. On June 2, 1984, the existing collective bargaining agreement expired, with union members voting to both reject the company's new contract offer and also to perform a strike action. The vote was unanimous and involved about 400 workers.

== Course of the strike ==
=== Points of contention ===
The strike began on June 2, 1984, with several hundred employees performing a walkout. (Note: Sources vary on the number of strikers. These include 300, 450, 500, and 800.) Picketing commenced outside of the plant, with one of the picket signs reading "Abraham Lincoln Freed the Slaves. Why Hasn't Marval?". Over the first day of picketing, the union said that only a few people crossed the picket line and returned to work, while the company told saying that about 45 percent of the plant's workforce reported for work.

Points of contention between the union and management included disagreements over pay and working conditions. Concerning pay, the company was offering a 10¢ (31¢ in 2025) hourly raise in the first year of the contract and a 25¢ (77¢ in 2025) raise in the second year. In contrast, the union was seeking an hourly wage increase of $1 ($3.1 in 2025) per year over the course of three years. At the time, workers at the plant made between $5.20 and $9.10 ($16.11 and $28.2 in 2025) per hour, with an average pay of $5.40 ($16.73 in 2025). According to the company, the pay was over a dollar more than the average throughout the turkey processing industry in the Southeastern United States.

Concerning working conditions, the union said that the company did not provide adequate medical personnel at the facility and alleged that some workers had had to work while injured. The union also protested the company's bathroom policy, which required workers to receive a pass from their supervisor. In order to limit disruptions at the plant, the number of passes issued were limited. Per Huffman, the bathroom policy and medical personnel issue received more attention from the local media than the pay disputes. Additionally, Harry Dull, the president of the Shenandoah Valley Council (the regional council of the AFL-CIO), said that working conditions were the major concern expressed by the workers, with a June 1984 report by the UPI listing several allegations from union leaders of a poor working environment. (Note: Specific allegations from union leaders reported by United Press International included a man being fired for attending a training session of the National Guard, a woman who urinated on herself after she was unable to obtain a bathroom pass having her pay docked, a woman whose request to leave work while her house was on fire being refused, and a woman whose arm was broken while on the job being denied medical attention.) Concerning the plant, Dull said, "This is the closest thing to a sweatshop you'll ever see".

In addition to these issues, the union was opposed to two proposals from the company—the elimination of the chief job steward position and a change to the system of union dues that would have allowed for workers to more easily opt out of paying—with UFCW Local 400 leader Thomas McNutt calling the proposals an example of "union-busting". Countering this, the company accused the union of using the strike as a way to bolster their power base and said that most of the union members were not supportive of the strike.

=== Further developments ===
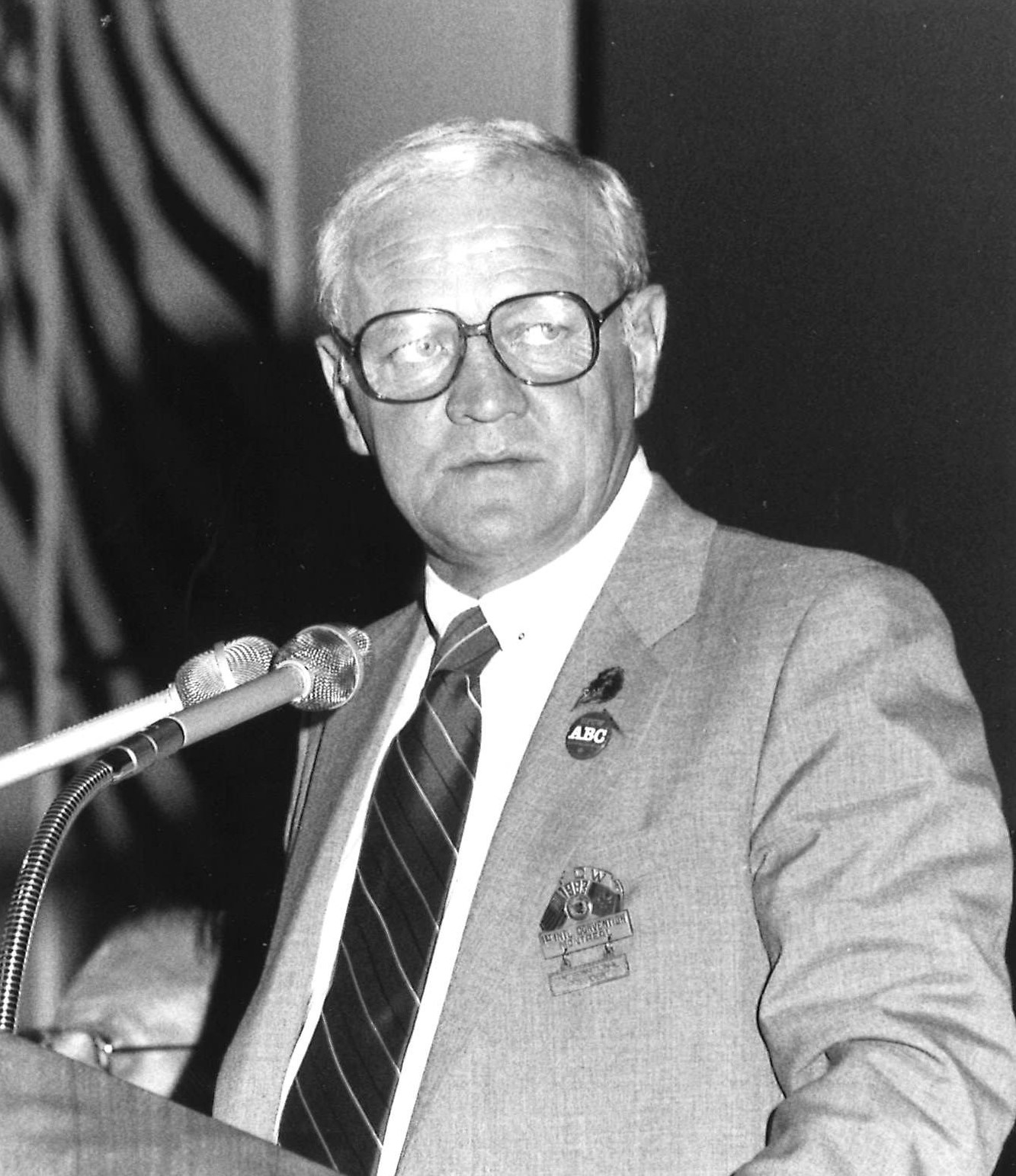
UFCW President William H. Wynn (pictured 1983) accused Marval of "impos[ing] oppressive working conditions on its employees" in a statement on July 12, 1984.

By the end of the first week, the company was telling striking employees that they had until the start of the next week to return to work or face the risk of being permanently replaced. Marval also accused the union of fining strikers who crossed the picket line $1,000 ($3,099 in 2025) and offered to pay any legal costs and provide legal aid to returning workers. Over the next several weeks, the company hired about 250 replacement workers. During this time, there were no discussions held between the union and the company. At the time, strikers were receiving about $40 ($124 in 2025) per week from the union in strike pay. In mid-June, the union accused the company of influencing a local food bank to deny requests for food from the families of striking employees, though the company denied this. Subsequently, the union filed unfair labor practice charges against both the company and the food bank. However, according to a company representative, all of the union's unfair labor practice charges were dismissed by the NLRB by that September.

Alongside the strike, the union initiated a boycott of products produced by Marval. While this boycott was initially local in scope, it eventually spread nationwide, and by June 17, boycott efforts were in place along the East Coast of the United States, from Florida to Pennsylvania. By the following month, the boycott had received support from the AFL-CIO, with McNutt saying that about $100,000 ($310,000 in 2025) per month would be spend on advertising for the boycott. In mid-July, he said that about six supermarket chains, including Foodarama in the Baltimore metropolitan area and Giant Food in the Washington metropolitan area, had stopped carrying Marval products. (Note: This claim was reported in a July 13, 1984, issue of The Washington Post. However, the newspaper also reported that a representative for Giant Food said that, while the company had previously stopped selling Marval products, it had resumed selling by that point.)

=== End of the strike ===
In a UPI report published on June 17, UFCW Vice President Don Cash said that 380 of the plant's 780 workers were on strike, though the company disputed this number, saying that only about 250 workers were still on strike and that over 100 had returned to work. The UPI also reported that a mediator of the Federal Mediation and Conciliation Service (FMCS) was scheduled to oversee renewed talks between the two sides on June 18. Discussions were held on June 22 and 23, but by this time, the company had replaced most of the striking workers and was unwilling to agree to the concessions, leading the negotiations to break down without an agreement in place. On July 13, The Washington Post reported that, of the 500 initial workers who went on strike, about 250 had returned to work, while an additional 250 replacement workers had been hired by the company. In early August, the union ended its picketing and told workers that they could return to work, ending the strike. In total, the strike lasted 61 days.

== Aftermath ==
=== Union decertification ===
In mid-August, a drive began at the plant to decertify the UFCW as the official bargaining unit for the employees, eventually garnering the support of a majority of the plant workers. As a result, according to an executive at the company, the union was decertified on October 1, and on October 5, the company informed the UFCW that they no longer represented workers at the plant. The UFCW contended that the company had not acted in a neutral manner during the decertification drive and that, further, an election would be required for the union to be decertified.

On October 25, the UFCW filed a lawsuit against the company, alleging that they had acted in violation of the Racketeer Influenced and Corrupt Organizations Act by providing gifts to employees as a way of persuading them to support decertification. In the lawsuit, the union was seeking $2 million ($6 million in 2025) in damages. On March 26, 1985, a regional director for the NLRB charged that Marval had violated labor laws, saying that a director at the company called several employees and requested their assistance in the union decertification process, promising compensation for their actions. However, the company denied these charges. In 1989, the lawsuit was dismissed.

=== Continued boycott ===
By September, most of the strikers had either returned to work or found employment elsewhere, but about 100 individuals continued to engage in some sporadic picketing outside of the plant. Additionally, the UFCW continued with its boycott of Marval products, and that month, a union representative said that about $250,000 ($775,000 in 2025) had been spent on advertising, with an expected increase in coverage to coincide with the Thanksgiving season. In November, the AFL-CIO launched an advertising campaign urging people to avoid buying Marval turkeys for their Thanksgiving dinner. This included a radio advertisement featuring a jingle called "Turkeybusters", based on the song "Ghostbusters", and the disbursement of about 75,000 $1 ($3.1 in 2025) rebate coupons to AFL-CIO union members in the Washington metropolitan area who bought non-Marval turkeys. Additionally, at a news conference, the union criticized Labor Secretary Raymond J. Donovan for promoting anti-union positions and Safeway, a grocery store chain, for threatening to fire union members who wore buttons supporting the boycott. By November 1985, the number of individuals who were still on strike had fallen to 33. The boycott ended in late 1986.

== Legacy ==
The labor dispute was the first strike in the history of Virginia's turkey processing industry. Around the same time that the strike occurred, the Shenandoah Valley Poultry Company's plant was sold to Perdue Farms, and because of the sale, the owners were not legally obligated to recognize the union there. Academic David C. Huffman has called the strike "one of the most contentious" in the Shenandoah Valley, and according to his research, it was one of only four strikes recorded by the FMCS to have occurred in the region between 1983 and 2014. In 2013, sociologist Kathleen C. Schwartzman cited the strike, as well as a successful unionization drive at the Delta Pride catfish processing plant in Mississippi, (Note: For further information, see 1990 Delta Pride strike.) as examples of the UFCW's efforts in the Southern United States. The following year, the strike was the subject of an article, written by Huffman, that was published in the Virginia Economic Journal by the Virginia Association of Economists.

== See also ==
- Timeline of strikes in 1984

== Sources ==
- "Bridgewater College professor publishes account of 1984 Dayton poultry strike". Augusta Free Press. January 8, 2015. Archived from the original on June 6, 2023.
- Carmichael, Dan (November 15, 1984). "The Thanksgiving 'Turkeybusters'". United Press International.
- "United Food and Commercial Workers". The Encyclopedia of Cleveland History. Case Western Reserve University. Archived from the original on May 17, 2017.
- Huffman, David C. (2014). "Labor Relations in the Shenandoah Valley: The Marval Poultry Strike of 1984". Virginia Economic Journal. 19. Virginia Association of Economists: 63–73. ISSN 1085-1046. OCLC 33275120.
- Perl, Peter (June 4, 1984a). "Va. Turkey Plant Struck Over Working Conditions". The Washington Post. ISSN 0190-8286. OCLC 2269358. Archived from the original on August 28, 2017.
- Perl, Peter (June 7, 1984b). "Strike Hits Peaceful Shenandoah". The Washington Post. ISSN 0190-8286. OCLC 2269358. Archived from the original on January 31, 2026.
- Perl, Peter (July 12, 1984c). "AFL-CIO Calls for a Boycott of Marval Turkeys". The Washington Post. ISSN 0190-8286. OCLC 2269358. Archived from the original on August 28, 2017.
- Perl, Peter (September 14, 1984d). "AFL-CIO Launches Turkey-Season Assault on Marval Poultry". The Washington Post. ISSN 0190-8286. OCLC 2269358. Archived from the original on August 28, 2017.
- Perl, Peter (November 20, 1984e). "Food Union Escalates Turkey War". The Washington Post. ISSN 0190-8286. OCLC 2269358. Archived from the original on August 28, 2017.
- Perl, Peter (March 27, 1985). "NLRB Says Marval Used Illegal Payoffs To Help Oust Union Va. Turkey Processing Firm Issues Denial". The Washington Post. ISSN 0190-8286. OCLC 2269358. Archived from the original on August 19, 2026.
- Schwartzman, Kathleen C. (2013). The Chicken Trail: Following Workers, Migrants, and Corporations Across the Americas. Ithaca, New York: ILR Press. ISBN 978-0-8014-5116-4. LCCN 2012027611. OCLC 893671039.
- Serrin, William (November 26, 1985). "Outside Turkey Plant, Union Is Testing a Boycott". The New York Times. p. 16. ISSN 0362-4331. OCLC 1645522. Archived from the original on November 23, 2017.
- "Feathers really flying in turkey strike". Suffolk News-Herald. Vol. LXII, no. 144. United Press International. June 17, 1984a. p. 3 – via Virginia Chronicle.
- "Turkey strikers fail to agree". Suffolk News-Herald. Vol. LXII, no. 151. United Press International. June 25, 1984b. p. 2 – via Virginia Chronicle.
