= Timeline of strikes in 1985 =

Strikes in various countries

In 1985, a number of labour strikes, labour disputes, and other industrial actions occurred.

== Background ==
A labour strike is a work stoppage caused by the mass refusal of employees to work. This can include wildcat strikes, which are done without union authorisation, and slowdown strikes, where workers reduce their productivity while still carrying out minimal working duties. It is usually a response to employee grievances, such as low pay or poor working conditions. Strikes can also occur to demonstrate solidarity with workers in other workplaces or pressure governments to change policies.

== Timeline ==
=== Continuing strikes from 1983 ===
- Anti-Duvalier protest movement, including strikes, against the dictatorship of Jean-Claude Duvalier in Haiti.
- 1983-85 Bolivian protests, including strikes, against austerity policies adopted by the government of Hernán Siles Zuazo in Bolivia.
- 1983-85 Continental Airlines strikes, series of strikes by Continental Airlines workers, including a 25-month pilots' strike.
- 1984–85 Eaton's strike
- 1984 Globe Steel strike, 4-year strike by Globe Steel Corporation steelworkers in the Philippines, the longest strike in the country's history.
- Mudginberri dispute
- 1984–1985 United Kingdom miners' strike, year-long strike by coal miners in the United Kingdom, represented by the National Union of Mineworkers against layoffs.
- 1984–1985 Yale strike, strike by Yale University clerical workers in the United States.

=== January ===
- 1985 Philippines transport strike

=== February ===
- 1985 Gujarat riots
- 1985 Mississippi teachers' strike, the first teachers' strike in Mississippi history.
- 1985 Pan Am strike
- SEQEB strike of Queensland, 1985

=== March ===
- Påskestrejkerne 1985, general strikes in Denmark.
- 1985 Sudanese Revolution
- 1985 Writers Guild of America strike, 2-week strike by Writers Guild of America members.

=== April ===
- 1985 Italian journalists' strike

=== May ===
- 1985 Blyvooruitzicht strike, strike by gold miners at the Blyvooruitzicht mine in South Africa after two National Union of Mineworkers members were fired.
- 1985 El Salvador social security strike, 1-month strike by social security workers in El Salvador.
- 1985 New York cemeteries' strike, 7-week strike.
- 1985 Rio Grande do Sul teachers' strike
- 1985 Swedish public sector strike
- 1985 United Airlines strike
- 1985 Yosemite National Park strike, 10-day strike by Yosemite National Park concessions workers, the first strike in the park's history.

=== June ===
- 1985 Ford Motor Argentina occupation
- 1985 Jamaica general strike
- 1985-87 Silentnight strike, 18-month strike by Silentnight workers in the United Kingdom.

=== July ===
- 1985 Bath Iron Works strike
- Dollar Sweets dispute
- 1985 Western Union strike, 10-day strike by Western Union workers in the United States.
- 1985 Wheeling-Pittsburgh Steel strike

=== August ===
- 1985–1986 Hormel strike
- 1985 Major League Baseball strike

=== September ===
- 1985 strike of Ethiopian Jews in Israel, strike by Ethiopian Jews in Israel protesting against the Chief Rabbinate of Israel's policy that they had to undergo conversion to be recognised as Jews.
- 1985 Philadelphia newspaper strike
- 1985 Seattle teachers' strike
- 1985–1987 Watsonville Cannery strike

=== October ===
- 1985 Chrysler Canada strike
- 1985-86 Victorian nurses' strikes

=== November ===
- 1985 Adamjee Jute Mills strike, 1-week strike by Adamjee Jute Mills workers in Bangladesh.

=== December ===
- 1985–1986 New Bedford fishermen's strike
- 1985 UNESCO crisis, including a strike by UNESCO workers against job losses following the withdrawal of the United States and United Kingdom from the organisation.
