= Timeline of strikes in 1984 =

Strikes in 1984

In 1984, a number of labour strikes, labour disputes, and other industrial actions occurred.

== Background ==
A labour strike is a work stoppage caused by the mass refusal of employees to work. This can include wildcat strikes, which are done without union authorisation, and slowdown strikes, where workers reduce their productivity while still carrying out minimal working duties. It is usually a response to employee grievances, such as low pay or poor working conditions. Strikes can also occur to demonstrate solidarity with workers in other workplaces or pressure governments to change policies.

== Timeline ==
=== Continuing strikes from 1983 ===
- 1983 Arizona copper mine strike, 3-year strike by Phelps Dodge copper miners, represented by the United Steelworkers.
- 1983-85 Bolivian protests, including strikes, against austerity policies adopted by the government of Hernán Siles Zuazo in Bolivia.
- 1983-85 Continental Airlines strikes, series of strikes by Continental Airlines workers, including a 25-month pilots' strike.
- 1983-84 Douglas Aircraft strike, 16-week strike by Douglas Aircraft Company workers in the United States over wages.
- 1982-84 French auto strikes strikes led by immigrant workers in the automobile industry in France against low salaries and discrimination.
- 1983-84 Sagunto strikes, series of strikes and protests in Sagunto, Spain, over the closure of the Altos Hornos del Mediterráneo steel plant in the city.
- 1983 Suriname bauxite strike, by bauxite miners in Suriname against tax increases designed to qualify the country for an International Monetary Fund loan.

=== January ===
- Moroccan Intifada of 1984, including strikes, in Morocco over rising food and education costs resulting from International Monetary Fund structural adjustment policies.
- 1984 Uruguayan strikes, series of strikes against the Civic-military dictatorship of Uruguay, resulting in the 1984 Uruguayan general election.

=== February ===
- 1984 Ecuadorian oil strike, strike by oilfield workers in Lago Agrio, Ecuador, over road, electricity, and water conditions.

=== March ===
- 1984 Indian dockworkers' strike, strike by dock workers in India calling for wage parity with steelworkers.
- 1984 Lorraine steelworkers' protests, including strikes, part of the Lorraine steelworking crisis.
- 1984–1985 United Kingdom miners' strike, year-long strike by coal miners in the United Kingdom, represented by the National Union of Mineworkers against layoffs.

=== April ===
- 1984 Las Vegas casinos strike, 75-day strike by casino workers in Las Vegas, United States, breaking the record for the longest gaming strike in American history.

=== May ===
- Anti-Duvalier protest movement, including strikes, against the dictatorship of Jean-Claude Duvalier in Haiti.
- Cammell Laird Shipyard occupation
- 1984 West Germany metalworkers' strike, 7-week strike by metalworkers in West Germany, represented by IG Metall, calling for the introduction of a 35-hour work week.

=== June ===
- 1984 Marval turkey strike, a 2-month strike by workers at the Marval turkey processing plant in Dayton, Virginia.
- 1984 Iberia strikes, series of strikes by Iberia workers in Spain; including a 36-day strike by pilots over wages and a later strike by maintenance workers demanding union recognition.
- 1984 Israeli broadcast strike, 2-week strike by Israel Broadcasting Authority TV and radio workers in Israel.
- 1984 Merck strike, 3-month strike by Merck & Co. workers in the United States over cost-of-living.
- 1984 Minnesota nurses' strike, 38-day strike by nurses in Minnesota, United States, over working conditions and job security; one of the largest nursing strikes in American history at that point.

=== July ===
- Dunnes Stores strike, by Dunnes Stores shop workers in Ireland, represented by the Irish Distributive and Administrative Trade Union, refusing to handle produce from apartheid South Africa.
- 1984 Globe Steel strike, 4-year strike by Globe Steel Corporation steelworkers in the Philippines, the longest strike in the country's history.
- 1984 LILCO strike, 5-week strike by Long Island Lighting Company workers in the United States.
- 1984 New York hospital strike, 47-day strike by hospital workers in New York State, the largest healthcare strike in New York history at that point.
- 1984 United Kingdom dock strikes, strikes by dockworkers in the United Kingdom, including a 10-day strike in July and a 3-week strike in September, in sympathy with the 1984–1985 United Kingdom miners' strike.
- 1984 US military bases strike in Greece, 27-day strike by Greek workers at American military bases in Greece.

=== August ===
- 1984 Mount Vernon Hospital strike, 2-month strike by hospital workers at the Mount Vernon Hospital, New York, the longest strike in the hospital's history.
- 1984 Victoria Brewery strike, 5-day strike by Victoria Brewery workers in Nicaragua over a five-year wage freeze, the first strike in the country since 1979.

=== September ===
- 1984 Disneyland strike, 22-day strike by Disneyland workers in California, United States, the longest strike in Disneyland history at that point.
- 1984 Palestinian prisoners' hunger strike, 10-day hunger strike by Palestinians imprisoned by Israel in Al-Junaid Prison in Nablus over prison conditions.
- 1984 San Francisco restaurant strike, 95-day strike by restaurant workers in San Francisco, United States.
- 1984–1985 Yale strike, strike by Yale University clerical workers in the United States.

=== October ===
- 1984 General Motors Canada strike, 13-day strike by General Motors Canada autoworkers.
- 1984 Louisville Orchestra strike, 2-month strike by Louisville Orchestra musicians.
- 1984 Old Original Bookbinder's strike, 2-month strike by workers at the Old Original Bookbinder's restaurant in Philadelphia, United States, over health benefits.

=== November ===
- 1984–85 Eaton's strike, by Eaton's workers in Canada, represented by the Retail, Wholesale and Department Store Union.

=== December ===
- 1984 Air New Zealand strike, by Air New Zealand flight attendants.

== Changes in legislation affecting strikes ==
In the United Kingdom, the government of Margaret Thatcher passed the Trade Union Act 1984.

In Nicaragua, the Sandinista National Liberation Front-led Junta of National Reconstruction lifts a two-year ban on strikes in August. In September, pro-government unions passed a resolution voluntarily abandoning the use of strikes to settle labour disputes.
