= 1984 Disneyland strike =

1984 labor strike in Anaheim, California, United States

- Date: September 25 – October 17, 1984 (3 weeks and 1 day)
- Location: Anaheim, California, United States
- Caused by: Disagreements over the terms of new labor contracts
- Methods: Picketing; Strike action; Walkout
- Result: Ratification of new labor contracts that included a two-year wage freeze with concessions from the company on certain benefits

Parties
Bakery and Confectionery Workers International Union Local 66; Hotel Employees and Restaurant Employees Union Local 681; International Brotherhood of Teamsters Local 88; Service Employees International Union Local 399; United Food and Commercial Workers Local 324	Disneyland

In September 1984, about 1,800 employees at Disneyland in Anaheim, California, United States, represented by five different labor unions went on strike over the terms of a new contract. The strike lasted about 3 weeks and ended the following month with a compromise agreement between the company and the unions. It is the largest strike to take place at the park.

In 1984, about a third of the employees at Disneyland were represented by five different unions, covering various positions in the theme park that included bakers, janitors, and ride operators, among others. The contracts between the company and these unions, which negotiated as a coalition, were set to expire on September 16. As part of a new deal, the company was seeking wage decreases, citing a decline in attendance over the past several years that had been exacerbated by the 1984 Summer Olympics in nearby Los Angeles. In further negotiations that lasted until late September, the company submitted an offer for a two-year wage freeze and cuts to certain benefits. Union members voted to reject the offer and authorize a strike action.

The strike began on September 25, with picketing outside of the park. Shortly after it began, the park received a court order barring picketing from private property near the park. In early October, several union officials were arrested for violating the court order, with the unions filing a lawsuit seeking damages of several million dollars stemming from the arrests. Around the same time, the unions began to plan for a nationwide boycott of both Disneyland and Walt Disney World. On October 16, a tentative agreement was reached between the two sides, with the strike coming to an end the following day. As part of the deal, the unions agreed to a two-year wage freeze, but gained concessions that allowed present union members to maintain several of their employee benefits.

Following the strike, tensions were high between employees and management, with several union members quitting in the years following. Additionally, in further contract negotiations, management continued to seek compromises, with a union official saying that the company cut full-time positions and decreased the percentage of its wealth that it shared with employees. As of 2024, the strike remains the last to take place at the park.

== Background ==
=== Unions at Disneyland ===
Sleeping Beauty Castle at Disneyland (pictured 1969)

In September 1984, Disneyland, an American theme park in Anaheim, California, had contracts with five labor unions that represented 1,844 employees in several different positions, including bakers, hotel workers, janitors, and ride operators. The local unions consisted of the following:

- Bakery and Confectionery Workers International Union Local 66
- Hotel Employees and Restaurant Employees Union Local 681
- International Brotherhood of Teamsters Local 88
- Service Employees International Union Local 399
- United Food and Commercial Workers Local 324

These unions were part of a coalition that coordinated labor negotiations with the management. Altogether, they represented about a third of the park's workforce, with the rest of the park's roughly 5,000 total workers being represented by other unions. The existing contracts between Disneyland and the five unions were set to expire on September 16, 1984, with Disneyland's other unions having contracts running until either 1985 or 1986.

=== Contract negotiations ===
Several days before the contracts were set to expire, the Associated Press (AP) reported that the park's management, as part of a new three-year labor agreement, was seeking a 17 percent pay decrease, consisting of a seven percent decrease in the first year and five percent decreases over the last two years. Management said that the pay decreases were due to a decline in attendance, falling from an annual attendance of 11.5 million in 1985 to under ten million in 1983. They additionally said that attendance had drastically fallen as a result of the 1984 Summer Olympics in Los Angeles. At the time, unionized employees operated on a pay scale of between about $7 and $10 (equivalent to $21.69 and $30.99 in 2025) per hour.

On September 16, the existing labor contracts expired, but both sides agreed to continue to operate under the terms while a new agreement was still negotiated. The following day, a contract proposal was voted down by union members. However, the union and management did agree to meet later that week with a member of the Federal Mediation and Conciliation Service. The AP reported that Disneyland was training clerical workers to replace unionized employees in the event of a labor strike, and United Press International (UPI) quoted a representative for The Walt Disney Company as saying that the company would bring in workers from other departments in the event of a labor dispute. If it occurred, it would be the park's third strike in its history, following a 1979 labor dispute that saw maintenance workers conduct a 13-day walkout.

On September 24, about 1,400 of the 1,844 workers voted on the management's final offer, despite union officials advocating for its acceptance. Among other things, the management's proposal would have included a two-year pay freeze and the end of certain benefits and policies for new hires. These policies concerned health, seniority, and welfare benefits. However, approximately 69.25 percent of the voters chose to reject the proposal and authorize a strike, surpassing the necessary threshold of two-thirds to authorize the labor dispute. According to David Stillwell, a union organizer with SEIU Local 399, "There wasn't a sufficient [strike] plan because the leaders of the union were caught off guard. ... All of that had to be constructed at midnight going forward from the strike vote."

== Course of the strike ==
=== Early activities ===
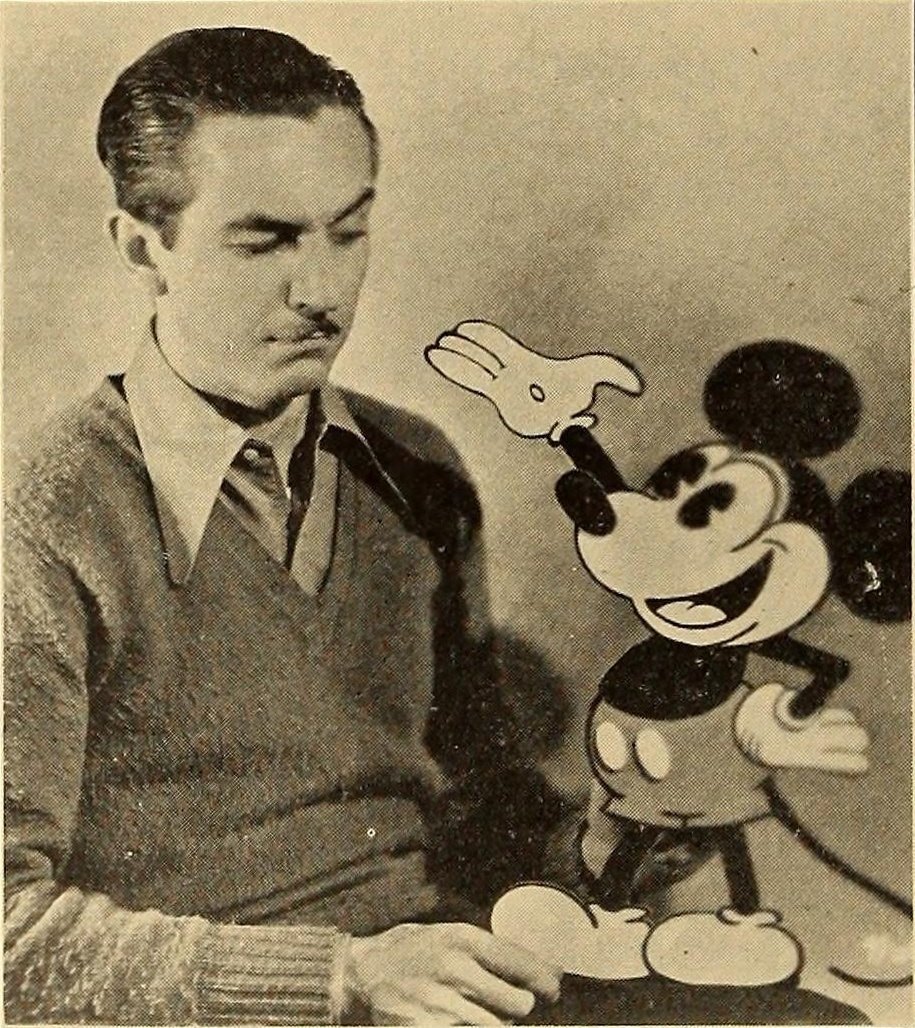
Picketing strikers had clothing attire and signs depicting Mickey Mouse and Walt Disney (pictured 1931).

On September 25, roughly 1,800 workers from the five unions went on strike, with a walkout commencing at 6 a.m. Picketing commenced shortly thereafter outside of the facility, with many wearing buttons and t-shirts showing Mickey Mouse inside of a no symbol. Several carried signs depicting the park's founder, Walt Disney, with one sign saying, "We miss you, Walt". Other signs advised visitors to instead visit Knott's Berry Farm, another California-based amusement park. In addition to picketing, the strikers distributed pamphlets to visiting guests and cautioned them about the safety of some of the rides, which would be operated by replacement workers. The union also had operatives covertly enter the park to distribute pamphlets to park guests. Park officials said that Disneyland would remain in operation, with approximately 3,200 workers remaining. They additionally said that they would be bringing in workers from Walt Disney World in Florida, and considerations were given to bringing in workers from Tokyo Disneyland. The strike began on the same day that Michael Eisner became chief executive officer and chairman of the Walt Disney Company.

On September 27, UPI reported that lawyers for the park had sought a temporary restraining order against the picketers from the Orange County, California Superior Court. Additionally, they were seeking damages of $250,000 ($775,000 in 2025) from the involved unions, arguing that they had failed to leave private property. By October 3, picketing was continuing outside the park's gate, but, pursuant to a court order barring them from doing so near the ticket booths and in the parking lot, was taking place off of private property. The previous day, federally mediated negotiations had abruptly ended after company negotiators presented the same offer that the union members had voted to reject on September 24, with the company saying that they would not be making any new offers. Meanwhile, the union said that it was seeking annual pay increases of between 3 and 8 percent.

On October 4, UPI reported that the federal mediator working on the dispute was unable to call any additional meetings between the two sides as a result of the 1984 federal government shutdown. By that time, a spokesperson for the park said that 300 union members had crossed the picket line and resumed working. On October 6, the company informed the strikers that they were to return to work or risk being replaced. Later that day, the striking unions held a candlelight vigil outside of the park in honor of Walt.

=== Arrests and proposed boycott ===
On October 9, approximately 150 union members acted in defiance of the court order and marched near the ticket booth, littering copies of the court order on the ground and chanting, "We want a contract". Six union officials were arrested for during the event, with park officials detaining them before eventually turning them over to police officers. Following the arrests, the unions announced that they would be suing the park for $18 million ($56 million in 2025) in the Orange County Superior Court, saying that the park officials' citizen's arrests had "caused humiliation, emotional distress and damage to the reputations" to the arrested individuals. A day after the arrests, another march took place near the ticket booth after strikers were given replacement notices, with park officials saying that strikers not returning to work the following day would be replaced. As part of the demonstration, about 500 workers discarded their notices into a trash bin. On October 12, the international presidents of the five unions announced that they would be launching a nationwide boycott involving approximately 4.1 million members against both Disneyland and Walt Disney World. Around the same time, strikers made plans to picket outside the Laguna Beach, California, house of Dick Nunis, the park's president.

=== End of the strike ===
On October 14, management and union officials announced that they had reached a tentative agreement to bring an end to the strike, with the company backing down from its final offer that it had initially presented the unions. Union members were expected to vote on the agreement on October 16. While the federal mediator involved in the case said that the terms of the agreement would initially be kept private as part of the negotiations process, later reporting said that the agreement included a two-year wage freeze and concessions from the company on benefits, with current employees keeping their existing benefits. This included part-time employees who worked 20 hours per week. Additionally, the agreement would limit the power of Disneyland to subcontract work normally done by union members to non-union workers. According to Michael O'Rourke, a union spokesperson, "In the new contract they can't subcontract any more than 10 percent of the work performed by any of these unions."

We did recommend ratification, and while we don't feel we really gained much over the old contract, we were certainly victorious in our fight to stop Disneyland from securing all the contract takeaways they were pursuing.

— Union spokesperson Michael O'Rourke, in discussing the tentative agreement

On October 16, with union officials recommending ratification, the agreement was approved in a member vote of 696 in favor and 292 against. Over 800 union members did not participate in the vote, which UPI noted was consistent with the number of employees that park officials had said had returned to work at that time. The contract also included protections for union workers who had returned to work by that time, which caused some frustration amongst the still-striking workers, and contained an agreement that the unions would drop their personal lawsuits against the company and any unfair labor practice charges filed with the National Labor Relations Board. Disneyland announced that they would return all striking employees to their previous positions while keeping on replacement workers that they had hired during the course of the strike. The strike ended on October 17, with workers reporting for their 8 a.m. shift.

== Aftermath and legacy ==
The strike was the largest in Disneyland's history. In reference to the strike's 22-day length, several former strikers began to refer to themselves as "Club 22", modeled after the park's dining club called Club 33.

=== Later organized labor activity at Disneyland ===
In 1985, a strike occurred at the nearby Disneyland Hotel, which was owned and operated not by the park but by the Wrather Corporation. That strike involved a local union of the Hotel Employees and Restaurant Employees Union and saw Cesar Chavez join the picket lines in a show of support.

Journalist Matt Coker, in a 2015 article in OC Weekly, said that the strike had been "a gut punch to employee morale". The labor dispute resulted in increased tensions between the employees, with hostilities between union members who crossed the picket line during the strike and those who remained on strike until the end. Stillwell said that there were some fistfights between employees that occurred after the strike, with former strikers often being fired for the acts, and several former strikers quit in the ensuing years.

Gabriel San Román, another OC Weekly journalist, noted in the 2010s that the strike contributed to an end of the paternalistic relationship that had existed between workers and management prior. Coinciding with an uptick in union employees quitting, many "scabs", per San Román, began to be promoted to management positions. In subsequent contracts between the park and the union, management continued to push for compromises on employee benefits, with SEIU Local 399 organizer David Stilwell saying that the company shared an increasingly smaller percentage of its wealth with its employees and decreased the number of full-time positions at the park. According to San Román, tensions between management and workers only began to improve significantly in the mid-2000s.

Writing in 2018, San Román said that there was not another united front of organized labor at the park until the formation of the Coalition of Labor Resort Unions in 2016. Around that time, the journalist noted similarities between the 1984 strike and the then-ongoing Fight for $15 campaign, which included the participation of several Disneyland employees. As of 2024, the 1984 dispute remains the last strike at the park.

=== In media ===
In 1987, the strike was the subject of a scholarly article by researchers Eric M. Eisenberg and Ruth C. Smith, published in the academic journal Communication Monographs, which analyzed the strike from a psychological perspective. In 2019, OC Weekly published a multi-part series about the strike, titled "Alt-Disney", in commemoration of the 35th anniversary of the labor dispute.

== See also ==
- Disney animators' strike - A 1941 labor dispute at Walt Disney Productions
- Timeline of Anaheim, California
- Timeline of strikes in 1984
- Timeline of the Walt Disney Company
