= 1984–1985 Yale strike =

Strike by clerical workers at Yale University in 1984–85

The 1984–1985 Yale strike was a strike by clerical workers at Yale University in the United States, from September 1984 to January 1985.

== Background ==
Yale University is a private research university in New Haven, Connecticut. One of the oldest universities in the United States, it has one of the largest university endowments in the world, has one of the largest academic libraries in the United States, and has been affiliated with a number of Nobel laureates in its history.

Clerical work is a form of white-collar work centered on record keeping. As part of their duties, clerical workers will often take and file records, staff service counters and phones, and perform related administrative tasks. Clerical workers can include secretaries, laboratory technicians, and hospital aides. At Yale University in 1984, 82% of the clerical workers were women, earning an average of $13,473 annually. The Yale clerical workers were organised into the Federation of Hospital and University Employees Local 34.

== History ==
=== Strike ===
On 27 September 1984, the clerical workers went on strike. The aims of the strike was a three-year contract that raises worth 38% of and a guarantee of no layoffs. The union also accused the university of discriminating against women in its pay scale.

Due to the strike, up to 40% of classes at the university had to be held off campus, after professors refused to cross the picket line. These classes were held in other buildings in the city, including private houses, churches, community centres, and the York Square Cinema. The university library reduced its opening hours. A significant number of blue collar workers at the university also refused to cross the picket line, leading to the university's dining halls being shut down and waste collection being impacted. The university reimbursed students $72.80 each week for the price of food. University sporting events, on the other hand, were largely unaffected.

A significant demonstration was held on 6 October, blocking the road in front of the house of Bart Giamatti, the Yale president. The demonstration was broken up by police, who arrested 190 demonstrators on misdemeanor charges. On 27 October, another significant demonstration was held in front of Woodbridge Hall, including addresses from civil rights activists Bayard Rustin and Ralph Abernathy. After having blocked the street in front of the Hall for an hour, police moved to break up the demonstration, arresting 430 demonstrators on charges of disorderly conduct.

On 10 October, the workers rejected an offer containing a 24% pay raise. On 25 October, the university rejected an offer to have a panel of three professors, one chosen by each side and one jointly chosen, arbitrate a contract.

On 13 November, the university and the workers returned to the negotiating table for the first since 9 October.

=== Student support for the strike ===
Despite the impact on students, and mixed feelings about the strike among the student community, students at Yale staged a number of actions in support of the striking clerical workers. On 29 September, students held a demonstration in support of the striking clerical workers, presenting a petition with the signatures of 4700 students calling for an arbitrated settlement. On 24 October, 141 students would participate in a sit-in at the university library, refusing to leave at closing time, the largest of the three library sit-ins that had been held to that point. The sit-in was ended after university secretary John Wilkinson threatened to suspend the students on the spot. On 15 January, 31 students would participate in a sit-in of the university president's office. The sit-in ended after the president threatened to suspend the protestors.

102 students would also file a class-action lawsuit against the university at the New Haven Superior Court, claiming that students suffered "on account of failure to deliver educational, custodial and dining hall services" and that the university administration had "destroyed the atmosphere of collegiality and intellectual inquiry." In November, 150 students would take part in a tuition strike, led by law student Andy Tomback, refusing to pay the winter term tuition fees until the university agreed on a deal with the striking workers.

=== December pause ===
On 29 November, the striking workers voted 800 to 250 to temporarily return to work during December, ahead of the Christmas holiday season, and to resume the strike in January. The striking workers also voted 959 to 79 to reject a new offer from the university of a 25,45% pay raise. John Wilhelm, a negotiator for the union, justified the pause in the strike by pointing to the absence of students over the holidays, meaning that the workers would only return during a very slow working period and would strike again once the pace picked up as students returned.

On 8 January 1985, the university and the striking workers met at the negotiating table for the first time in the new year. As the union's deadline of 18 January to resume the strike approached, no agreement had been reached.

=== Resolution ===
On 18 January, the union's deadline to resume the strike, the union as well as the blue collar union voted to extend the deadline to 26 January. Following a night of around-the-clock negotiations, a preliminary agreement was reached in the early hours of 19 January. On 22 January, the striking workers voted 890 to 2 to accept the agreement, which included an average raise of 35%, bringing the average wage to around $18,000. The contract also contained provisions allowing women in low-paying roles to advance up the pay scale faster, as well as a new dental plan, and an end to penalties for women who took maternity leave.

== Reactions ==
=== Contemporary reactions ===
Yale president Bart Giamatti described the strike as "a fundamentally economic dispute in a nonprofit organization," saying that it "involves a set of claimants against a finite set of resources. And there's a whole series of judgments about whether or not one can simply compromise or divert resources from everyone else – financial aid policies, tuition levels which are rational, salaries of faculty and staff, deferred maintenance, set-up costs for labs." Political science professor James C. Scott criticised Giamatti's claims, saying that it "most certainly serves to divide us and set us at one another's throats." On 12 October, Giamatti told The New York Times that Yale would not "be able to do things that are absolutely contrary to our other principles or to compromise all our other obligations" and that "the notion that somehow these fine people's lot is going to be made better the longer they stay out I think is just tragic." In the interview, Giamatti also stated that the strike had "become very personalized" and that he had become "the personification of evil. There has been a fair amount of abuse and vilification."

Lane Kirkland, AFL-CIO president, stated that "the issue in this strike is fairness" and that a successful strike "will be felt in work places throughout this land." Five Connecticut chapters of the American Association of University Professors (AAUP) urged the university "to reconsider its bargaining position and return to the table with new proposals."

William Serrin of The New York Times described the union's strike as "highly imaginative," saying that it used unconventional tactics, that it "became highly skilled at winning press attention," and that it "used Yale's reputation as an essentially liberal institution, dedicated to human values, against the university, saying the university should bargain and negotiate a contract." The Yale Workers' Club of the Communist Party USA stated that the strike "reaffirms the value of class-struggle trade unionism, unity on an industrial basis, organizing the unorganized (including women and clerical workers) and proves the old adage that the best defense is a good offense."

=== Historical assessments ===
Yale historian Michael Denning has described the strike as "an emblem of a nationwide self-organization of low-paid "service" workers, mainly women, disproportionally African-Americans, Latinos and immigrants," along with the Justice for Janitors movement. Josh Eidelson of the Yale Daily News wrote that winning the strike "meant defying entrenched perceptions about men, women and work."

Jacob Remes of New York University has described the strike as an early example of workers losing the "ability to win by strikes alone" and that the tactics developed by the striking clerical workers "today seem like a blueprint for the labor movement."

== Aftermath ==
In 1985, Julie Hovey and Gary Lavorgna, two Yale employees who met on the picket lines, later married. In 2022, Amelia Prostano, who had worked as a clerical worker at Yale for forty years, wrote for the Yale Daily News that the strike "changed my life, and that union made me who I am," saying that when she retired, she "was able to retire comfortably with a good pension and excellent healthcare, two major benefits my union won through years of hard work and intense negotiations with Yale."

The next strike by clerical workers at Yale would take place in February 1996. Another strike would occur in 2003.

On 25 September 2014, a demonstration was held in front of the Sterling Memorial Library to commemorate the 30th anniversary of the strike.

== In popular culture ==
In 1995, a book recounting the strike titled On Strike for Respect: The Clerical and Technical Workers' Strike at Yale University, 1984–85 was written by Toni Gilpin, Gary Isaac, Dan Letwin, and Jack McKivigan.
