= Ray Grebey =

Clarence Raymond Grebey Jr. (March 10, 1928 – August 28, 2013) was the chief labor negotiator for Major League Baseball's owners in the early 1980s.

== Personal life and education ==
Grebey was born on March 10, 1928, in Chicago, Illinois. He attended Kenyon College and the University of Chicago. He served in the Army during the Korean War. He died from cancer at the age of 85.

== Major League Baseball ==
Initially hired by MLB in 1978, he succeeded in avoiding a strike in 1980, before having to negotiate for the owners during the 1981 strike. He became known as "the man who killed baseball." He left baseball in 1982 to work for Pan Am Airlines.
