= The Encyclopedia of Cleveland History =

Online urban encyclopedia

- Author: David Van Tassel and John Grabowski
- Language: English
- Subject: History of Cleveland
- Genre: Reference encyclopedia
- Publisher: Indiana University Press
- Publication date: October 1987 (print); May 1998 (online)
- Publication place: United States
- Media type: hardbound / internet
- Pages: 1128
- ISBN: 0-253-31303-1
- Website: case.edu/ech/

The Encyclopedia of Cleveland History is a historical reference work covering Greater Cleveland and the Northeast Ohio community. It was the first modern study of an American city published in encyclopedia format. It had two print editions (1987 and 1996) before moving online, becoming the first encyclopedia of a major American city on the Internet. The Encyclopedia is currently published digitally in collaboration with Case Western Reserve University and the Western Reserve Historical Society.

== Print history ==
The Encyclopedia of Cleveland History was the brainchild of Dr. David Van Tassel, a history professor at Case Western Reserve University and the creator of National History Day. Van Tassel was approached by Homer Wadsworth, the director of The Cleveland Foundation, to write a history of Cleveland. Van Tassel decided that the project was best constructed as an encyclopedia rather than as a monograph. Wadsworth agreed and The Cleveland Foundation provided the seed money for the book in 1980. The next year, Dr. John J. Grabowski, also of Case Western Reserve University, joined the project as managing editor.

The first edition of the book took seven years to produce. It was published in October 1987 by Indiana University Press in association with Case Western Reserve University. The single-volume work totaled 1,128 pages and had more than 3,000 articles written by 250 contributors. It received positively, with reviews noting its ease of use and the "uniform voice" achieved across its entries. One review called it, "a monumental book in every sense. The first edition went through four printings in one year.

Because of the book's success, Van Tassel was able to receive grants allowing for the additional publication of illustrated volumes covering topics of special interest such as fine arts and women. As the first modern study of an American city to be published in encyclopedia format, the Encyclopedia also served as a model for similar public history projects published by other cities, such as Philadelphia. During the period from 1980 to 1996, Van Tassel raised $1.2 million for the Encyclopedia of Cleveland History. This money went to paying publishing costs, encyclopedia staff, and writers, which included both university faculty (including members of Case Western Reserve University as well as other schools in northeast Ohio, like Cleveland State University, John Carroll University, and Oberlin College) and community members, who also helped determine the book's content.

In 1996, an updated version of the Encyclopedia was published to mark Cleveland's bicentennial. It was published by Case Western Reserve University in conjunction with the Western Reserve Historical Society as was a second, companion volume: The Dictionary of Cleveland Biography. As such, the second edition of the Encyclopedia only contained 2,000 entries while the Dictionary consisted of over 1,600 biographical sketches. Both volumes were distributed by Indiana University Press.

By 2001, the two print editions of The Encyclopedia of Cleveland History had sold 24,000 copies.

== Digital history ==
In 1997, Case Western's Department of Information Services agreed to host an internet-based version of the encyclopedia. The IS staff donated more than $100,000 (equivalent to $200,560 in 2025) worth of time to transfer the text of the 1996 edition of the Encyclopedia to a server at the university. They also designed an interactive website for the encyclopedia and created editorial software allowing for the constant modification of the information on the website. Being online has also allowed the Encyclopedia to include more visuals, including video, which has helped add understanding to its entries.

The Encyclopedia of Cleveland History website went live in May 1998, becoming the first urban encyclopedia on the internet and serving as a model for similar projects nationwide. In its first month of operation, the site had 8,000 hits. By September 1999, it was averaging 50,000 hits per month from visitors around the world. By 2016, monthly hits numbered over 850,000.

The CWRU Department of History created the Krieger-Mueller Chair, a joint position between the university and the Western Reserve Historical Society, to oversee the digital encyclopedia project, which by then had more than 4,400 articles. Additionally, two history graduate students supported by the Ralph M. Besse Fellowship assist in the maintenance of the online version of the Encyclopedia. Grabowski, the current Krieger-Mueller Chair, encourages community engagement with the project, saying "Look at it. Let us know what you don't see that you want to see" and noting that the Encyclopedia's website has a tab for suggested corrections. In 2018, the Encyclopedia launched an initiative to reconnect with Clevelanders by updating existing articles and creating new content in contemporary subject matters like African American History.
