= Two-tier system =

Type of payroll system

A two-tier system is a type of payroll system in which one group of workers receives lower wages and/or employee benefits than another.

The two-tier system of wages is usually established for one of three reasons:

- The employer wishes to better compensate more senior and ostensibly more experienced and productive workers without increasing overall wage costs.
- The employer wishes to establish a pay for performance or merit pay wage scheme that compensates more productive employees without increasing overall wage costs.
- The employer wishes to reduce overall wage costs by hiring new employees at a wage less than the wage of incumbent workers.

A much less common system is the two-tier benefit system, which extends certain benefits to new employees only if they receive a promotion or are hired into the incumbent wage structure.

That can be distinguished from traditional benefit structures, which permit employees to access a benefit, such a retirement pension or sabbatical leave, after they have achieved certain time-in-position levels.

Two-tier systems became more common in most industrialized economies in the late 1980s. They are particularly attractive to companies with high rates of turnover for new hires, such as in retail, or with many high-wage, high-skilled employees about to retire.

== Motivations ==
Trade unions generally seek to reduce wage dispersion, the differences in wages between workers doing the same job. Not all unions are successful, however. A 2008 study of collective bargaining agreements in the United States found that 25% of the union contracts surveyed included a two-tier wage system. Such two-tier wage systems are often economically attractive to both employers and unions. Employers see immediate reductions in the cost of hiring new workers. Existing union members see no wage reduction, and the number of new union members with lower wages is a substantial minority within the union and so is too small to prevent ratification. Unions also find two-tier wage systems attractive because they encourage the employer to hire more workers.

Some collective bargaining agreements contain "catch-up" provisions, which allow newer hires to advance more rapidly on the wage scale than existing workers so that they reach wage and benefit parity after a specified number of years, or they provide wage and benefit increases to new hires to bring them up to party with existing workers if the company meets specified financial goals.

== Examples ==
- Public education systems in the United States have employees categorized as either "certified" or "classified." Certified employees (or colloquially certifieds) have teaching certificates which are used by their current position; all other employees are considered classified employees (or colloquially classifieds). Certified teaching full-time positions include teacher aides and, in some cases, substitute teachers. Certified non-teaching full-time positions include security officers and administrative assistants. Non-teaching certified part-time positions include food service (cafeteria) workers, bus drivers, and facility maintenance. Some education system positions are excluded from consideration as certified employees because they were technically categorized under the United States Department of Health and Human Services when the United States Department of Education broke off from the former Department of Health, Education, and Welfare in 1979. Certified employees are almost always represented by teachers unions, which use collective bargaining to improve compensation, benefits, and/or conditions for their members. Classified employees' interests are not necessarily represented by the unions, and they are not even permitted to join. In most states (of the U.S.), this results in differences in benefits like:
  - certified employees having sick days that roll over to the next year, and classified employees have sick days that expire at the end of the calendar (or fiscal) year;
  - many school systems allow certified employees to accumulate vacation days for the entirety of their career but cap the total number of vacation days that classified employees can keep;
  - certified employees' unused vacation days are often paid out upon retirement, and classified employees' unused vacation days are not;
  - certified employees can have tenure and classified employees cannot;
  - classified employees cannot participate in the same retirement plan offered to certified employees;
  - education system compensation concerns discussed in the media do not necessarily include classified employees' compensation; and
  - classified positions are contracted hourly positions and are therefore not paid for a postponed school day (such as for inclement weather), but certified positions are salary positions, and in some states, cancelled school days (which will not be replaced) can still count toward their required 170-180 days of teaching students.

== Problems ==
Some studies have found problems with two-tier systems like higher turnover for newer lower-paid employees and a demoralized workforce. After enough time, a two-tier wage system can permanently lower wages in an entire industry. Lowering productivity expectations for new hires seems to alleviate some of those problems.

== See also ==
- Two-tier healthcare
