= Richard J. Ferris =

American business executive (1936–2022)

- Born: August 31, 1936; Sacramento, California, U.S.
- Died: January 16, 2022 (aged 85); Orlando, Florida, U.S.
- Education: Cornell University
- Occupations: Business executive; CEO of United Airlines Limited; Co-chairman of Pebble Beach Golf Links

Richard Jesse Ferris (August 31, 1936 – January 16, 2022) was an American business executive who was the CEO of UAL Corporation, the former holding company of United Airlines, and was later the co-owner of the Pebble Beach Golf Links in Monterey County, California. During his time as the CEO of UAL Corporation, he helped restructure the company into a travel industry conglomerate called the Allegis Corporation, which combined the assets of United Airlines, The Hertz Corporation, Westin Hotels, Hilton International, and the Apollo Reservation System.

== Early life and education ==
Ferris was born in Sacramento, California, on August 31, 1936. His father was an insurance salesman. He served three years in the United States Army after the Second World War, and spent time in Japan managing an army officers' club in Tokyo before returning to the states to graduate with a hotel management degree from Cornell University in 1962.

== Career ==
Ferris started his career with Western International Hotels, which later became Westin Hotels & Resorts. He spent his time managing a number of the company's properties across the country. During this time, he also was the general manager of the Continental Plaza Hotel in Chicago.

He joined UAL Corporation, the parent holding company of United Airlines, after UAL's acquisition of Western International Hotels in 1970 and was made president of United's Food Services Division in 1971. He then became group vice president of marketing in 1974. He would go on to become CEO of United in 1976 at the age of 39 and chairman of the board in 1978. Ferris was named CEO of Allegis Corporation in 1979 and chairman and president in 1982. He followed his mentor, Edward Carlson, who himself had been Western Hotels' CEO.

During his time as the CEO at UAL Corporation, he was a proponent of airline deregulation, which began in the United States with the passing of the Airline Deregulation Act of 1978. He also led acquisitions by purchasing the Pacific routes of Pan American Airways. He was also at the helm of the company during the airline pilots' strike of 1985. The strike itself was prompted by UAL's demand for a two-tier wage structure, in which newly hired pilots would earn less than current employees. UAL won its demand for a two-tier system after a 29-day strike that ended in June 1985.

He organized the company into a travel conglomerate and renamed it Allegis, while trying to battle activist investors' attempts to take over the company. The conglomerate brought together United Airlines, along with the company's acquisitions of the rental car company Hertz, Westin Hotels, Hilton Hotels, and the Apollo Reservation System. In a later interview in 2002, he would say that the name sounded like "a bad cold".

During this time, he was noted to have worked on an 'unusual' financing deal with The Boeing Company where he paid the corporation $700 million in convertible notes which could have been exchanged for 16% of the common stock of the Allegis combined entity. The move was intended to act as a deterrent against hostile takeovers but instead ended up offending its shareholders over dilution of their existing shares.

The conglomerate did not result in the intended synergies and a takeover bid was mounted by the company's pilot union for $4.5 billion. The board agreed to disband the conglomerate and undertake a restructuring effort in 1987, resulting in the sale of the Hilton Hotels and Hertz rental car businesses. Ferris stepped down as the CEO in June 1987.

Ferris stayed connected with the travel industry, partnering with American businessman and former MLB commissioner Peter Ueberroth to acquire Guest Quarters Hotels while partnering with the American multinational conglomerate General Electric. The company would go on to merge with DoubleTree hotels in December 1993, and later with the Promus Hotel Corporation. Ferris quit the combined company in 1997.

Ferris partnered with Ueberroth, actor Clint Eastwood, and golfer Arnold Palmer to buy the Pebble Beach Company, which owned resorts and golf courses including Pebble Beach Golf Links, from Japanese investors at the Sumitomo Bank and Taiheiyo Club. He remained as a co-chairman of the club for 20 years before stepping down in 2020. Ferris also was the PGA Board chair for policy. He was a member of the board at various companies, including Procter & Gamble, Rockwell Collins, and BP-AMOCO.

== Personal life ==
Ferris was married to Kelsey Ferris. The couple had three children. Ferris was an avid golfer and took part in golf tournaments as late as in 2021, when he was already diagnosed with amyotrophic lateral sclerosis (ALS) and his condition had rapidly deteriorated.

Ferris died from ALS in Orlando, Florida, on January 16, 2022, at the age of 85.
