= Suffolk News-Herald =

Newspaper in Virginia, U.S.

- Type: Daily newspaper
- Format: Broadsheet
- Owner(s): Suffolk Publications LLC, a division of Boone Newspapers
- Publisher: Lindsay Richardson
- Editor: Ed Pugh
- Founded: 1873
- Headquarters: 110 W.Finney Ave. O'Connor Suite; Suffolk, Virginia 23434; United States
- Circulation: 11,165 (as of 2021)
- Website: suffolknewsherald.com

The Suffolk News-Herald is a newspaper serving Suffolk, Virginia, United States. The News-Herald is published weekly on Wednesdays, and is available free at newsstands and businesses throughout Suffolk and surrounding areas. It is owned by Suffolk Publications LLC.

Issues from August 1, 1927 to December 31, 2009 have been scanned and are accessible through the Virginia Chronicle.
