= 1985 Pan Am strike =

1985 labor strike

- Date: February 28 - March 28, 1985 (1 month)
- Location: United States
- Caused by: Dispute between union and company over terms of a new labor contract
- Methods: Picketing; Strike action
- Result: Union agrees to terms similar to those the company made prior to the strike

Parties
Pan Am	Transport Workers Union of America

The 1985 Pan Am strike was a labor strike involving several thousand workers, all members of the Transport Workers Union of America (TWU), at Pan American World Airways. The strike began on February 28 and ended one month later on March 28. It involved roughly 19,000 workers.

During the 1980s, Pan Am was struggling financially, and in the early years of the decade, its five labor unions agreed to concessions in order to help the company remain financially stable. However, in December 1984, the labor contracts between Pan Am and the unions expired without replacements, with the unions requesting a lifting of the concessions that had included a pay freeze. TWU, which represented about 5,800 workers in various positions at the company, was especially vocal, and on February 28, after failing to come to an agreement with the company, they went on strike. Initially, the four other unions agreed to honor TWU's picket lines. However, after several days, citing concerns over the negative long-term impact a prolonged strike could have on the company, several unions (including those representing pilots and flight attendants) crossed the picket lines and returned to work. Following this, TWU and Pan Am agreed to meet for negotiations, which occurred throughout March and led to a tentative agreement being reached on March 23. In a narrow vote finalized on March 28, the union agreed to accept the contract (which contained similar provisions to the proposal Pan Am had made TWU before the strike) and ended the strike. While the contract included several concessions, the union also received annual pay increases of 5 percent for the duration of the contract.

The strike came during a difficult time in the relationship between organized labor and American airlines, with 14 strikes occurring at airlines between 1980 and 1986. Several of these strikes saw a high degree of interunion support. Historian David J. Walsh summarized the strike by saying that, while TWU won some gains alongside some concessions, the union's efforts were hurt by a breakdown in interunion support and genuine concerns from some unions over the negative effects of a long-term strike. Following the strike, Pan Am sold some of its assets in 1985, and in 1991, the company declared bankruptcy and ceased operations.

== Background ==
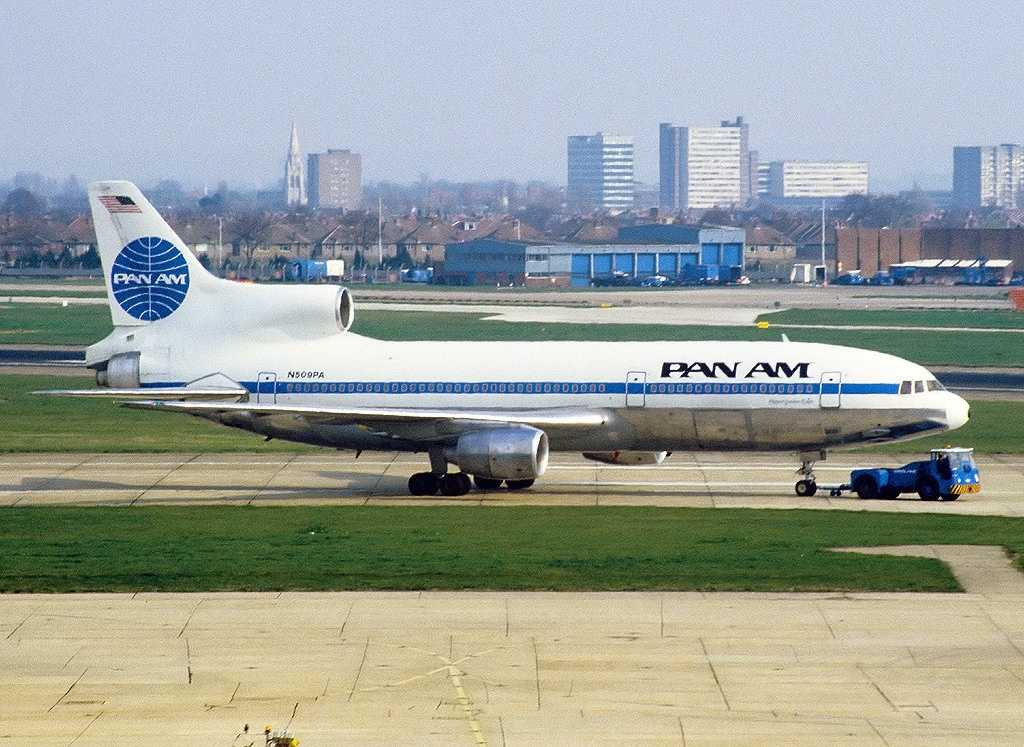
A Pan Am commercial airliner, 1984

On December 31, 1984, labor contracts between Pan American World Airways and five labor unions (Note: These unions included the Air Line Pilots Association, International; International Brotherhood of Teamsters,;the Independent Union of Flight Attendants; the Transport Workers Union of America; and the Flight Engineers International Association.) representing 21,000 of the company's 26,000 workers (Note: Sources differ slightly on the numbers, with some claiming 19,000 union workers and a total workforce of 27,000.) for the company expired without replacements in line, with the company arguing that further concessions regarding wages and productivity levels were required from the unions in order to maintain financial stability. In the preceding years, Pan Am had experienced major losses, with the company posting a US$206.8 million loss for 1984 and a $51 million loss for 1983. The company itself had not been profitable since 1980, and since then, over 8,000 workers had been laid off. However, in negotiations, the unions rejected an extension for these concessions. In a previous round of negotiations in 1982, the unions had agreed to a pay freeze with an agreement that pay increases would return by the end of 1984. However, as this did not happen, the Air Line Pilots Association (ALPA) took legal action and won a "snapback" of wages on December 26. Pan Am, in an effort to continue the concessions, appealed the decision, though the company lost this fight by late February 1985. Around the same time, the company began to prepare for possible strike action from the unions, with the Transport Workers Union of America (TWU, representing 5,800 Pan Am baggage handlers, flight dispatchers, food service employees, and mechanics) legally free to strike starting on February 28. TWU had previously staged a one-day walkout in August 1984. The other labor unions, in a show of solidarity, stated that they would probably honor TWU's picket lines if they were to go on strike. In a preemptive move, Pan Am began placing advertisements recruiting new hires for the company, which one union representative claimed was "a maneuver to put pressure on the union".

On February 26, the union representing roughly 1,500 pilots came to a tentative agreement with the company, with the union making some concessions to the company. According to some experts in the airline industry, the agreement included 25.7 percent wage increases for the pilots spread out over 32 months. Despite the agreement with the pilots, TWU still maintained plans to begin striking on February 28 and had agreements with other union leaders to honor their strike. TWU was seeking a 14 percent wage increase, which had been frozen since 1982, and additional guarantees regarding job security. Additionally, TWU was opposed to reduction in benefits, a new two-tier pay scale, the addition of more part-time workers, and other changes the company was trying to make. At the time, maximum base pay for Pan Am mechanics was over $10,000 less than their counterparts at United Airlines, while baggage handlers similarly made several thousand dollars less than those at United. The day before the strike deadline, the union rejected the company's counteroffer of four five percent wage increases over the next three years and bonuses of $1,200 for mechanics and $900 for other union members. According to a company representative, they had been holding off on making an offer to TWU until a deal had been made with the pilots. The strike action would be the first major strike at Pan Am in 20 years.

== Course of the strike ==
The strike commenced at 12:35 a.m. on February 28. On the first day of the strike, a TWU representative claimed that most of Pan Am's 400 daily flights would be grounded, affecting some 39,000 passengers. However, on the first day, Pan Am managed to operate about 100 flights. Starting on the first day, airports that Pan Am operates out of were picketed by the strikers. Union leaders for some of Pan Am's other unions agreed to honor TWU's strike, and while there was some questioning from the pilot's union, which had recently come to an agreement with the airline, they also agreed not to cross the picket line. Speaking to the Associated Press on the first day, a union representative said he believed the strike could last a long time. As a result of the strike and subsequent groundings, people who had tickets for Pan Am flights were directed to flights from other airlines, such as American Airlines and Eastern Air Lines. Additionally, in spite of union claims that the strike had grounded nearly all of Pan Am's flights, a company representative stated that 60 percent of the company's international flights were still operating, but that domestic flights had been significantly affected. By March 1, the company was not operating any domestic flights. At that time, no negotiations were scheduled between TWU and Pan Am, and while a company representative stated that they hoped for a quick end to the strike, agreeing to the terms set forth by TWU would financially hurt the company and threaten its recovery. An economics professor from Wayne State University stated that, "A long strike can kill Pan Am", while an industry analyst stated that the strike could affect Pan Am's chances of turning a profit for the year.

By the beginning of March, the number of Pan Am flights had dropped to about 30 worldwide, including 40 percent of its international flights, but with none in the United States. By March 6, the Chicago Tribune reported that the Independent Union of Flight Attendants (IUFA) had set a strike deadline for April 1, at which time, if Pan Am and IUFA had not come to an agreement on a new contract, they would also go on strike. That same day, however, ALPA reached a return-to-work agreement with the company. The development was considered a major blow to the strike, as Pan Am announced they would begin to expand the number of flights they were offering. Pan Am CEO C. Edward Acker praised the pilots for "demonstrating their support for the welfare of the company, while on the other end, one TWU representative used the term "scab" to describe the pilots' actions. On March 7, flight engineers, represented by the Flight Engineers International Association, also crossed picket lines and returned to work, while some flight attendants did so as well. In addition, Pan Am was recruiting some management workers to temporary fill-in as flight attendants. With the developments, Pan Am announced they soon hoped to have 50 percent of their normal number of flights operating in the next few days. However, Pan Am was still losing approximately $5 million per day, and both IUFA and the Teamsters maintained a strike deadline of April 1.

On March 9, TWU and Pan Am announced their first negotiation session since the start of the strike, scheduled for the following day, with the company being represented by noted labor negotiator Ray Grebey. Grebey had a reputation for being a hardline negotiator with anti-union leanings, and he had previously served as a negotiator for MLB team owners during the 1981 Major League Baseball strike. These negotiations, held at the Roosevelt Hotel in New York City, had been ordered by a federal mediator. On March 23, Pan Am agreed to rehire over one hundred flight attendants who had been fired for not crossing TWU's picket line. Following several days of negotiations, on March 24 both sides announced that they had come to a tentative agreement that would see an end to the strike. According to a TWU representative, the terms of the agreement were similar to the terms proposed by the company prior to the strike, but with slight changes that made them more palatable to the union. Terms included the aforementioned pay raise, alongside bonuses ranging from $600 to $1,000 and an extension in the time it takes for union members to reach the "top scale" in the company's pay scale from four to seven years. Additionally, Pan Am would be allowed to hire some part-time workers under certain circumstances. While TWU leadership urged members to vote to accept the agreement, some members were vocally opposed to the concessions. Additionally, the tentative agreement did not see an immediate end to the picketing, which would continue until a new contract was ratified. Voting on the contracts began on March 26. On March 28, the contract was ratified in a vote of 3,583 for and 2,193 against, thus bringing an end to the strike.

== Aftermath ==
While the strike with TWU had ended, Pan Am was still in negotiations with the flight attendants and Teamsters. However, the company came to tentative agreements with the two unions several days later, thus avoiding further strike action. The following month, Pan Am, still hurting financially, sold their Pacific Division to United Airlines. Furthermore, Pan Am's relationship with organized labor continued to be uneasy, and amidst further contract disputes in 1989, TWU voted once again to approve strike action against the company. By 1991, Pan Am declared bankruptcy, with Delta Air Lines purchasing the majority of their remaining assets.

The strike was watched closely by other airlines, as the 1980s saw a strain in the relationship between unions and airlines. Between 1980 and 1986, American airline companies saw 14 strikes, and in 1985 alone, both United and Alaska Airlines would also experience strike action from unions. In all three of the 1985 cases, interunion support played a role in the strike. However, historian David J. Walsh noted the decision by other unions at Pan Am, ALPA, to return to work after a few days highlighted the concern many in these unions had that prolonged strike action could seriously jeopardize the future of financially struggling airlines and possibly even drive them to bankruptcy. Discussing the strike and its resolution, Walsh wrote that the TWU managed to avoid permanent replacement and secured some gains to balance out their concessions. However, the success of their strike was hindered by limited support from other unions and the recognition that a prolonged strike could potentially lead to the carrier's downfall, making other concerns irrelevant.

== Sources ==
- Albrecht, Sandra L. (2017). The Assault on Labor: The 1986 TWA Strike and the Decline of Workers' Rights in America. Lanham, Maryland: Lexington Books. ISBN 978-1-4985-3771-1.
- Sleigh, Stephen R. (1995). "The Difficulty of Sticking Together in Tough Times". In Cappelli, Peter (ed.). Airline Labor Relations in the Global Era: The New Frontier. Ithaca, New York: ILR Press. pp. 212–222. ISBN 978-0-87546-344-5.
- Walsh, David J. (1994). On Different Planes: An Organizational Analysis of Cooperation and Conflict Among Airline Unions. Ithaca, New York: ILR Press. ISBN 978-1-5017-1740-6.
- Walsh, David J. (2009). "Strikes in the U.S. Airline Industry, 1919–2004". In Brenner, Aaron; Day, Benjamin; Ness, Immanuel (eds.). The Encyclopedia of Strikes in American History. Armonk, New York: M. E. Sharpe. pp. 577–589. ISBN 978-1-317-45707-7.
