= William Serrin =

American journalist (1939–2018)

William G. Serrin Jr. (March 16, 1939 – February 22, 2018) was an American journalist for the Detroit Free Press and New York Times.

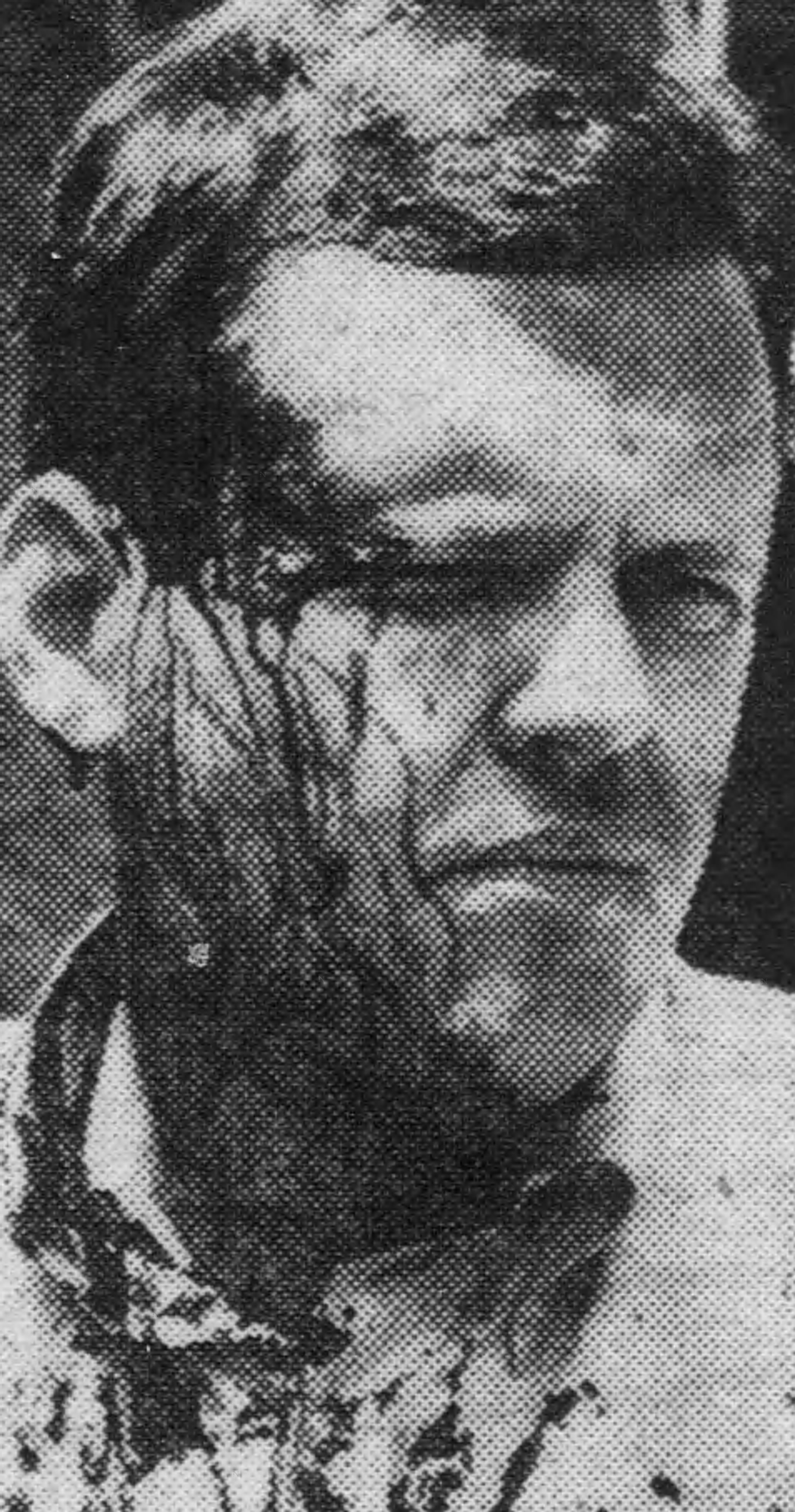
Serrin during the 1967 Detroit riot

Born in Saginaw, Michigan, Serrin graduated from Central Michigan University in 1961. He began working for Booth Newspapers in 1964, and joined the Detroit Free Press staff two years later. In 1967, the Free Press won a Pulitzer Prize for Local General or Spot News Reporting for its coverage of the Detroit riot to which Serrin contributed. Serrin's reporting on the Kent State shooting of 1970 was honored with a George Polk Award. In 1971, he shared The Hillman Prize with Carolyn See, Kenneth Lasson, Robert Coles, and Richard Todd. In 1973, Serrin published his first book, The Company and the Union, which detailed the relationship between General Motors and the United Auto Workers. Serrin worked for the New York Times from 1979 to 1986, when he left to begin work on his second book. Prior to publication in 1993, Homestead: The Glory and Tragedy of An American Steel Town was reviewed by Robert Reich in the New York Times and Samuel G. Freedman in the Los Angeles Times.

Serrin later taught at New York University School of Journalism. Upon retirement in 2014, he was inducted into the Michigan Journalism Hall of Fame. Serrin received an equivalent honor from his alma mater, Central Michigan University. Serrin died of a heart attack on February 22, 2018, at home in Boca Raton, Florida, aged 78.
