= 1985–1987 Watsonville Cannery strike =

California labor action

- Date: September 9, 1985 – March 11, 1987 (1 year, 6 months and 2 days)
- Location: Watsonville, California, United States
- Caused by: Disagreements over the terms of a new labor contract
- Goals: Union sought to prevent cuts in wages and benefits
- Methods: Corporate campaign; Picketing; Strike action; Walkout
- Result: Union and companies agreed to new industry-wide labor contract that preserved employee benefits, but included wage cuts

Parties
International Brotherhood of Teamsters Local 912	Richard A. Shaw Frozen Foods; Watsonville Canning Company

The 1985–1987 Watsonville Cannery strike was a labor strike that involved over 1,000 workers at two food processing facilities in Watsonville, California, United States. The facilities were owned by Watsonville Canning and Richard A. Shaw Inc., two of the largest frozen food processors in the United States, while the workers were all union members of the International Brotherhood of Teamsters (IBT) Local 912. The strike began on September 9, 1985, and completely ended about 18 months later, on March 11, 1987.

The city of Watsonville has historically been a center for the food processing industry in California, and by the mid-1900s, it had branded itself as the "frozen food capital of the world", with eight frozen food processing plants in the city. These plants were in an industry-wide labor contract with IBT Local 912, who represented several thousand employees in the city. By the 1980s, due to an increase in migration from Mexico, a large number of these food processing workers were Latinos. Around that same time, changes in the food processing industry caused the Watsonville plants to become less profitable, and in 1982, Watsonville Canning (the single-largest frozen food processor in the United States) negotiated an hourly wage decrease for their union employees from $7.06 to $6.66. In 1985, their labor contract had expired, and Watsonville Canning began pushing for further wage and employee benefits reductions. Richard A. Shaw Inc., another major food processing company in the city, similarly began requesting wage and benefits reductions, which were opposed by the local union. On September 9, union members from both companies began a strike, with picketing commencing shortly thereafter.

The strike received significant support from the local Latino community, with support coming from Chicano and Hispanic organizations such as the League of United Latin American Citizens and the Mexican American Political Association. Additionally, civil rights leaders Cesar Chavez and Jesse Jackson were supportive of the strikers, viewing the labor dispute as part of a larger struggle for civil rights for Latinos in the United States. Additional support came from organized labor activists in both northern California and nationwide, and the strike was characterized by its militancy and rank-and-file leadership. The strikers elected their own Strike Committee that managed the overall daily operations of the strike, and the Teamsters for a Democratic Union also contributed to organizing the strike. On February 14, 1986, Shaw and Local 912 agreed to an hourly wage of $5.85, which soon became the industry standard. However, the strike continued against Watsonville Canning through 1986. In August, the company tried to decertify the union in an election, but failed, and subsequently the company (which had taken on a large debt during this time) declared bankruptcy, with the plant being sold. A tentative contract was reached with the new owners in March 1987 that set wages to the industry standard but contained cuts to medical benefits. While the IBT declared the strike over, several workers continued the dispute as a wildcat strike that lasted for about a week before the company agreed to include medical benefits, with the strike finally coming to an end on March 11.

Labor historians note the significance of the strike as one of the few successful strikes in the United States during the 1980s, compared to other strikes of the time such as the Arizona copper mine strike of 1983 and the 1985–1986 Hormel strike, with the Northwest Labor Press calling it "a rare union victory during an era of union-busting". In Watsonville, the strike coincided with increased political activity from the Latino community. Oscar Rios, a union organizer during the strike, was elected as the city's first Latino mayor several years later, stating, "The strikers helped change the politics in our city and county". However, in the years following the strike, most of the major food processors relocated from the city, with only one frozen food plant left in the city by 2000.

== Background ==
=== Food processing industry in Watsonville ===
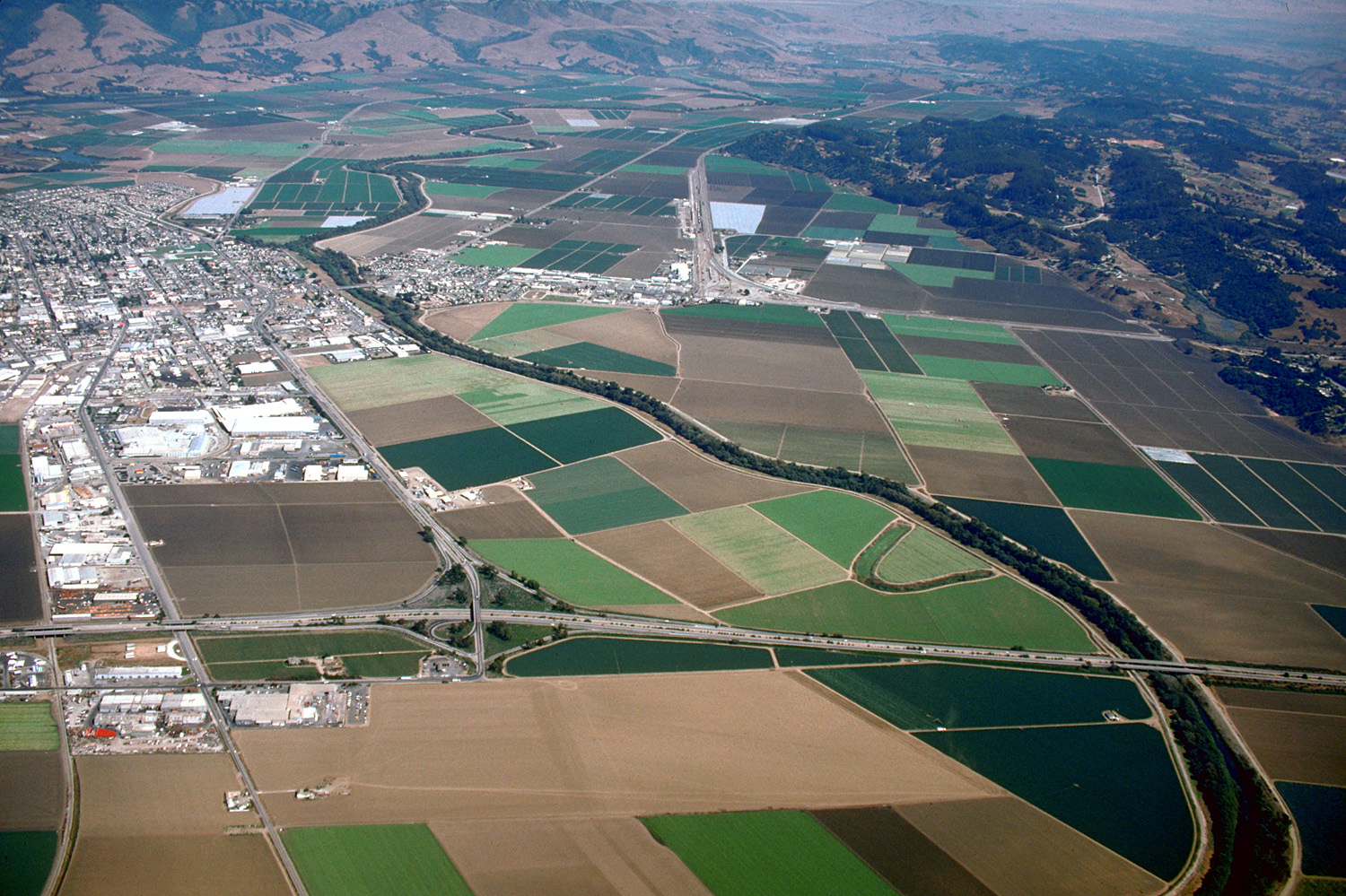
Partial view of Watsonville and surrounding agricultural area near the Pajaro River

Watsonville is a city located about 80 miles (130 km) south of San Francisco, in the Monterey Bay area. Founded in the mid-1800s by Americans from the east coast and European immigrants, the city had become a major food processing center by the early 1900s. Due largely to its location near the agriculturally productive Pajaro Valley and Salinas Valley regions (which by the 1960s were responsible for about 80 percent of vegetable production in the United States), Watsonville was a major canning location for vegetables grown in the area, such as broccoli, Brussels sprouts, and cauliflower. By the 1950s, food processors in the city began freezing this food instead of canning, and soon the city was home to eight frozen food plants, (Note: Multiple sources state that there were eight frozen food plants in Watsonville at the time. However, academic Patricia Zavella stated that there were eleven plants in Watsonville.) earning it the nickname of the "frozen food capital of the world". By 1986, the city, with a population of about 27,000, (Note: Sources vary slightly on the population, with sources differing between 25,000, 27,000, and 28,000.) was processing about 40 percent of the frozen broccoli, Brussels sprouts, green peppers, and spinach produced in the United States.

By the mid-1980s, the city's industry was dominated by two firms in particular: the Watsonville Canning Company and Richard A. Shaw Inc. Together, these two companies accounted for about 80 percent of Watsonville's frozen food output. These two firms were also the largest frozen food processors in the United States. Watsonville Canning, the larger of the two, was the largest frozen food processing company in the United States. It employed about 5,000 people and processed roughly half of the United States's supply of frozen vegetables. The company, which by the 1980s was owned by Watsonville native Mort Console, produced frozen vegetables for Birds Eye and private supermarket brands.

=== Latinos in the area ===
In 1900, Watsonville had a population of 3,528, of which only 118 were from Mexico. Many of the food processing workers in Watsonville were Portuguese or Slavic. However, as the agricultural industry in the region grew through the 1900s, more Mexican immigrants came to the area to find work through the Bracero program. Starting in the 1960s, the industry began recruiting female workers, primarily Mexican immigrants from South Texas, to work in the Pajaro Valley. Watsonville's food processing industry provided many of these immigrants with more stable employment than that of farmworkers, and the city became a center of a growing Latino population. Through the 1980s and 1990s, the city grew at an annual rate of about 38 percent, due in large part to Latino immigration, and many during this time were able to rise into the middle class. By the 1980s, Latinos made up a majority of the city's population, making it the first California city north of Fresno to hold that distinction. Among frozen food workers in the city, nine out of ten were Latino.

However, despite the change in demographics, white Americans still held most of the economic and political power in the city. Discrimination against Latinos was common in Watsonville, with housing discrimination being a major issue. In 1969, some Latino students at Watsonville High School held a walkout and boycott of classes, demanding that more Latino teachers and employees be hired by the school. By 1985, the mayor, fire chief and police chief were all white, and only one member of the city council was Latino. Additionally, Watsonville Canning was white-owned. Regarding the economic disparities between Latinos and white Americans, scholar Erik Davis once referred to Watsonville as "a poor town with a large, struggling migrant population".

=== Union activity ===
Through the 1930s and 1940s, labor unions began a concerted effort to unionize food processing workers in the southwestern United States. These efforts primarily targeted Latina workers and involved high-ranking Latina labor leaders, such as Luisa Moreno, Manuela Solis Sager, and Emma Tenayuca. Militant unions such as the Cannery and Agricultural Workers' Industrial Union (CAWIU), the United Cannery, Agricultural, Packing, and Allied Workers of America (UCAPAWA), and the Food, Tobacco, Agricultural, and Allied Workers (FTA), were largely responsible for these early efforts and led to large-scale strike actions such as the 1938 San Antonio pecan shellers strike. Both the UCAPAWA and the FTA were affiliate unions of the Congress of Industrial Organizations (CIO), which had been founded in the 1930s as an alternative to the more conservative American Federation of Labor (AFL). In the mid-1940s, the AFL-affiliated International Brotherhood of Teamsters (IBT) began to also organize workers in California, often in direct competition to union efforts from the FTA. The IBT's organization efforts were aided by the California Processors and Growers (CPG), an employers' organization representing agricultural businesses in the state, who supported the comparatively conservative IBT over the FTA. In 1950, following the passage of the Taft–Hartley Act, the FTA was expelled from the CIO, leading to the IBT becoming the dominant union in the industry. The IBT worked closely with business interests to create "sweetheart" contracts that were generally favorable to the companies, and in 1949, Edward T. Console, owner of Watsonville Canning, signed the first labor contract between a Watsonville food processing company and the IBT, setting a wage pattern for the city's industry as a whole. Under these industry-wide agreements, the Watsonville canneries would pay the same wages and offer the same benefits. Due in large part to these favorable contracts and conservativeness of the IBT, the food processing industry in California would not see a major industrial dispute for the next three decades.

==== Local 912 ====
In 1952, with assistance from the owners of Watsonville Canning, IBT Local 912 was organized in Watsonville to represent cannery workers in the city, and by 1986, they represented almost all of the roughly 4,000 food processing workers in Watsonville. By the mid-1990s, roughly one out of every four Watsonville residents were members of Local 912. This local union was closely aligned with the local business interests, leading to some researchers calling it a "company union" that "was controlled by a corrupt leadership". According to activist Frank Bardacke, "the bosses allowed the union officials a good deal of personal power, as long as they refrained from challenging the employer's prerogatives in production or encouraging workers to organize themselves". Some of the union leaders would socialize and play poker with cannery officials, and Richard King, who served as the secretary-treasurer for several years before becoming the local's president in 1967, was the father-in-law of a business partner at Richard A. Shaw. As the head of the local, he was generally uninvolved in union activities, rarely attending union meetings, and some rank and file union members were critical of his accommodationist approach to labor-management relations.

In 1985, about 70 percent of Local 912's membership was Latino, and more Latinos voted in Teamsters elections than they did in municipal elections. However, the local was dominated by white Americans who were largely disconnected from these members' concerns. Union meetings were held only in English and, until the mid-1980s, only one person on the local's leadership, a business agent who had been appointed by the local in 1968, spoke Spanish. Additionally, while women made up the majority of Local 912 membership, they were not represented on the local leadership, and few attended union meetings due to a lack of child care coverage from the local and the bureaucratic and parliamentarian nature of the meetings. Despite these issues, the local had managed to negotiate some of the highest wages for food processing workers in the country, with a base hourly pay up to $7.05 for most workers and up to $12 for machine operators, plus employee benefits.

=== Changes in the industry in the 1980s ===
In 1973, Local 912 membership peaked at about 7,000 members, with peak season employment in the Watsonville canneries reaching about 10,000. During this time, California held what an article in The New York Times called a "virtual monopoly" on the processing of certain vegetables. However, the mid-197s through the 1980s saw a continuous decline in both employment and union membership. This was due primarily to increased competition in the food processing industry from firms outside of Watsonville. Primarily, imports from Latin American countries, such as Guatemala and Mexico, were entering the United States market, and food processing operations in right-to-work states such as Texas had seen a noted growth. This growth was primarily due to lower labor costs, as in the mid-1980s, the average Texas food processing worker had an hourly wage of $3.36, while in Mexico and some Central American countries like Guatemala, workers earned only a few dollars per day. According to the United States Department of Commerce, between 1983 and 1984, foreign imports of broccoli and cauliflower increased from 33 million lb (15 million kg) to 65 million lb (29 million kg) and 21 million lb (9.5 million kg) to 31 million lb (14 million kg), respectively. In addition to increased competition, the time period saw a change in consumer preferences away from frozen or canned foods and towards more fresh food options. Between 1975 and 1983, over a dozen major canneries in California closed, leading to roughly 15,000 lost jobs, with only about 19,000 workers remaining in California canneries. According to academic Patricia Zavella, in the years leading up to 1985, "the global restructuring of agriculture ... prompted local farmers and processors to expand acreage in Mexico, grow new crops locally for the fresh market, and downsize food processing in Watsonville".

==== Wage decreases at Watsonville Canning ====
Food processing companies in Watsonville responded to these changing market trends by renegotiating labor contracts with Local 912. In 1982, Watsonville Canning negotiated an agreement with Local 912 wherein they would reduce their hourly wages from the industry standard of $7.06 to $6.66. (Note: These figures are given in several sources. Additionally, several sources state an hourly wage decrease of 40 cents. However, one source states that the wage decrease was from $7.75 to $6.66.) The company argued that the pay cut was necessary due to a decline in business, claiming that the company was near bankruptcy and the cuts would allow the company to remain profitable. Additionally, the company agreed to restore the wages if business improved. The cuts gave Watsonville Canning a competitive edge over the other food processing plants in Watsonville, with the company seeing a five percent increase in business during 1985. Soon after these changes were implemented at Watsonville Canning, other food processors began requesting similar wage decreases from the union.

=== Contract negotiations ===
In early 1985, the union and Watsonville Canning entered into negotiations for a new labor contract, with the existing contract, including the wage reduction agreement, set to expire that June. The company proposed a two-tier wage system that would see existing employees maintain their $6.66 hourly pay, while new hires would start at a base pay of $4.25. However, the union members voted to reject this proposal in August and instead requested that wages be restored to the original $7.06 rate. With the contract expired by this point, Watsonville Canning implemented this proposal as negotiations continued. Throughout negotiations, the company submitted 22 different offers, all of which containing rollbacks that would decrease wages and benefits. (Note: Sources vary considerably on the proposed wage reductions made by Watsonville Canning, with sources giving proposed hourly wages of $5.05, $4.75, $4.65, $4.45, and $4.25. Some sources expressed the wage decreases as a percentage of the workers' initial pay, with values of "almost 30 percent", "40 percent", and "cut almost in half". The Christian Science Monitor reported that the pay decreases were approximately equal to a 30 percent decrease for production workers and a 60 percent decrease for skilled workers.) During negotiations, the Federal Mediation and Conciliation Service became involved, and by September, the company implemented a base hourly pay for existing employees of $4.75, with new hires earning $4.25. Additionally, the company took away 54 employee benefit items, including a reduction in healthcare, vacation benefits, and an end to union dues automatically being pulled from employees' paychecks. In addition, Watsonville Canning instituted an increase in production quotas for broccoli processing, which was in violation of an agreement the company had with the union. The changes resulted in an increase in work accidents, as well as the firing of about 25 employees, many of whom had worked for the company for several years, for failing to meet these new standards. As part of these speedup policies, workers on the line were forbidden from using the restroom outside of their scheduled breaks. The changes were ill-received by the union members at large, with one calling it "a terrorist attack" on the workers. In defending the policy changes, Smiley Verduzco, an executive at Watsonville Canning, stated that there had been work slowdowns prior to the changes.

Around the same time, Shaw also left the industry-wide agreement and began pushing for terms similar to what Watsonville Canning had. Shaw proposed a base hourly pay reduction from $7.06 to $6.66, with new hires earning $4.43 per hour. Additionally, the company was pushing for 25 takeaways in employee benefits. As it became apparent that an agreement between Local 912 and both Watsonville Canning and Shaw was unlikely to be reached, the companies began preparing for possible strike action. Watsonville Canning began to stockpile its product during mid-1985, and additionally secured $18 million in credit from Wells Fargo. In an article for the Los Angeles Times, union officials stated that the speedups and policy changes made during mid-1985 were intended to force a strike in sentiments that were echoed by Charles Craypo, head of the economics department at the University of Notre Dame, who said, "Companies today are taking the offensive, doing things to weaken unions and sometimes forcing them into strikes that they can’t win". Don McIntosh, editor of the Northwest Labor Press, stated that the company had recently hired an anti-union law firm and, on their advice, were attempting to provoke a strike, hire permanent replacements, and decertify the union in a government-administered decertification election that would involve voting from those permanent replacements. Speaking about the policy changes and wage reductions, King said, "The companies are trying to break the union here and send us back into the 1950's".

In comparison to Watsonville Canning, Local 912 was unprepared for a strike. Leaders within the local were generally opposed to a strike, and the local lacked a strike fund. However, on Friday, September 6, at a meeting of 200 union members at the union hall, the union decided that a strike would commence. By this point, the workers had been without a contract for three months. While some workers had considered a walkout in early 1985, this decision was postponed until peak season in order to most affect the companies. The following day, an informal group was organized amongst the union members to create a rudimentary plan for the strike, and Watsonville Canning and Richard A. Shaw were served strike notices that day. On September 8, some members met at the union hall to create picket signs. The strike would be Watsonville's first in 37 years. The strike would target both Watsonville Canning and Richard A. Shaw, affecting over 1,000 workers. (Note: According to Linda Dailey Paulson of the St. James Encyclopedia of Labor History Worldwide, "the reported number of striking workers varied widely". Several sources state that the strike affected about 1,000 workers. However, this figure may only apply to workers from Watsonville Canning, as several sources report that that company employed about 1,000 people, while one source states that about 900 employees from Shaw went on strike. Other figures for the number of strikers involved include 1,100; 1,500; 1,600; 1,700; and 2,000. According to one source, the strike "at its height" involved about 1,700 workers.) Of these workers, about 85 percent were Latina, many single mothers. According to academic Margie Brown-Coronel, the strike was not only to oppose the company's wage decreases and benefits reductions, but "also ... to protest lack of leadership and support required of the Teamsters Union". The strike was somewhat unique in that rank and file members initiated the action, which was then supported by the international union. Meanwhile, other food processors in the area agreed to extend their $7.06 agreements with the union for another year in order to see the outcome of the labor dispute.

== Course of the strike ==
=== Early activities during the strike ===
The food processing workers began their strike on September 9, 1985. At 5 a.m. that Monday, union members met at the union hall and were given picket signs and sent to the gates of the two frozen food plants. At Watsonville Canning, the strikers formed a picket line that stretched for eight city blocks, while at Shaw, the line was a third of a mile long. Many of the picket signs were written in both English and Spanish, and many of the strikers brought their children with them. In response to the picketing, the district attorney and Console, who stated that he "feared for [his] personal safety", requested Santa Cruz County Superior Court Judge William Kelsay to issue a temporary restraining order against the strikers, which he granted at 8 p.m. that day, within 15 hours of the start of the strike. As part of the restraining order, there could be no more than four pickets within 20 feet (6.1 m) of each of Watsonville Canning's eight gates, pickets could not be within 10 feet (3.0 m) of each other, and only people going to work at the plant could congregate within 100 yards (91 m) of the plant. The restraining order significantly hampered the effectiveness of the strike, with each plant limited to only 60 pickets.

Soon after the strike began, the Watsonville City Council increased funding for their police department, with many in the department working twelve-hour shifts to ensure that at least twelve officers were at the scene of the picketing at all times. By 1 a.m. on September 10, the police had cleared the area around Watsonville Canning, and they issued their first citation against a striker after someone struck a delivery truck with a picket sign. By October, the police had arrested several strikers for violations of the restraining order. In an effort to further reduce the size of the picketing, Watsonville Canning replaced several of their gates with chain-link fencing, which decreased the number of pickets legally allowed around the property. Additionally, the company did not allow strikers to come into the plant to pick up their last paycheck, instead mailing it to them. On September 20, about 17 students from Watsonville High School were arrested after joining with picketers near the plant, and in the immediate aftermath, police in riot gear dispersed the crowd that had gathered to protest the arrests. Around the same time, Judge Kelsay upgraded the restraining order to an injunction.

=== Community support for the strike ===
To make up for the lost wages, strikers received a weekly strike pay of $55. (Note: Most sources state the value was $55, though one source gives the value as $50.) Strikers continued to pay union dues for the duration of the strike (which was equal to about twice what the workers earned in an hour of work), and the pay was a significant decrease from the $250 that most workers received in weekly pay. In addition to the lost income, strikers also lost employee benefits, and few received government assistance such as food stamps and other forms of welfare. Extended families and local food banks helped support many workers for the duration of the strike, and the strike received significant support from the local Mexican-American community. In several cases, strikers received extended credit from local grocers, and some had their rent payments delayed. Some supporters saw the strike as an "Anglo assault" on the Latino community, highlighted by the white power structure in the majority-Latino city. In an interview with the Los Angeles Times, Mike Herald, the head of a group of several community churches that provided charitable services to the strikers, expressed this opinion, saying, "The city’s white power structure has lined up on one side and the strikers on the other". Within the first few weeks, two support groups were formed to assist the strike, and the strikers began receiving donations from various Chicano groups such as the League of United Latin American Citizens and the Mexican American Political Association. Activists from nearby universities, such as Stanford University and the University of California, Santa Cruz (UCSC), also participated in supporting the strike.

==== Teamsters for a Democratic Union ====
One of the groups involved in the strike were the Detroit-based Teamsters for a Democratic Union (TDU), a group within the IBT that had been formed in the 1970s with the intent to challenge the conservative old guard and push for more militant union with more of an emphasis on rank-and-file leadership. The TDU had become involved in Local 912 activities in the early 1980s when it campaigned for union meetings to be held in both English and Spanish Some TDU members in Local 912 were active in pushing for a strike in mid-1985, and at the start of the strike, the TDU chapter in Watsonville attempted to fill the power vacuum in the strike leadership. The TDU also pushed for weekly strike meetings and attempted to raise the weekly strike pay from $55 to $100.

=== Strikebreakers and instances of violence ===
In order to continue operations during the strike, the two companies began hiring strikebreakers shortly after the strike began. These workers were paid slightly over $5 per hour, (Note: Sources vary on the exact hourly pay rate, with different values of $5.05 and $5.16.) with no employee benefits or guaranteed job security. For roughly the first two months of the strike, the plants operated with about 80 to 100 strikebreakers, whereas before the strike these plants operated with between 1,000 and 2,000 employees. As a result, the plants operated at a reduced production level. Through the strike, there was a high turnover rate among the replacement workers, with many working only a few weeks before quitting. However, by September 1986, Watsonville Canning had about 900 replacement workers in their employment.

"Just because you’re Catholic doesn’t mean you can’t throw rocks at scabs".

— Gloria Betancourt, a strike leader, discussing instances of violence against strikebreakers

Police accompanied the strikebreakers to and from the plants, as picketers would often intimidate them, sometimes spitting in their direction and yelling that they were "esquiroles" (the Spanish word for "scab"). Some violent outbreaks occurred in the first few months of the strike, including attacks on strikebreakers. Some of the strikebreakers' cars were vandalized, and strikebreakers used sand-filled socks to bust out the windows on the buses that carried the strikebreakers to and from the plants. Additionally, one striker was arrested for attempting to throw a Molotov cocktail at one of these buses. During the strike, three cars that were owned by company executives were destroyed, and instances of arson increased during that time. Several homes were firebombed, and two fires at properties owned by Watsonville Canning resulted in about $1 million in damages. In total, four instances of arson resulted in damages of about $2 million. Despite this, no major injuries were reported from strike-related activities.

=== Late 1985 ===
On October 6, the Watsonville TDU helped to organize a "Solidarity Day" rally in Watsonville that included a march to the Watsonville Canning plant, with about 3,000 supporters participating. Several days later, on October 15, about 400 strikers met to elect their own Strike Committee that would function independently of either the IBT or the TDU. Regarding the creation of this group, Gloria Betancourt, one of the rank-and-file union members who was elected to the committee, said, "We didn't trust the union officials anymore. We felt as workers we had to form our own Strike Committee". This strike committee, composed of workers from both plants, handled the day-to-day operations of the strike, which included, among other things, 24-hour picketing and food distribution. The same month that the strike committee was formed, Watsonville Canning presented their final proposal to Local 912. The company offered a base hourly pay of $5.05, as well as a preference for the replacement workers over the striking workers. On October 28, 1985, union members voted 800–1 to reject this offer. On November 3, the strike committee called for another rally, which was again attended by about 3,000 supporters. The following month, Local 912 held officer elections in which the more moderate incumbent members of the union were challenged by more militant candidates, including Betancourt, who was the first Mexican women to run for president in the local's history. While several members of this slate were elected, Betancourt lost her bid. King, meanwhile, was not reelected as an officer of the union. (Note: Sources differ slightly, with one source stating he declined to run for reelection, one stating that he retired, and another stating he resigned.) This trend of more militant union members winning Local 912 elections continued in next December's elections, though again Betancourt lost her bid for president.

=== Shaw settles with strikers ===
In February 1986, after several months on strike, the workers from Richard A. Shaw settled with that company, ending their strike on February 14. As part of the agreement, the workers accepted an hourly pay rate of $5.85, which, while higher than the $5.05 Shaw had proposed prior to the strike, was still significantly lower than the previous industry standard. The agreement affected about 900 union employees of Shaw, who ultimately took a 17 percent pay cut. Additionally, the contract contained language that would allow the company and union to renegotiate wages if Watsonville Canning settled with their employees for a lower rate. According to Chavelo Moreno, a member of the Strike Committee, the agreement set a wage ceiling for industry, which made it more difficult for the Watsonville Canning employees to negotiate a higher rate. In July 1986, union employees at another Watsonville plant accepted a pay rate of $5.85 per hour, cementing that as the new industry standard. However, the language of this master agreement that the IBT had with the industry included a "me-too" clause that would not allow Watsonville Canning to undercut this rate. According to Local 912 President Leon Ellis, the local had agreed to the $1.21 pay cut after Shaw disclosed their financial information to the union that proved that the company was losing money. The local had also requested that Watsonville Canning disclose their private financial information as part of contract negotiations, but Verduzco stated that the company would only do so if the union paid a $500,000 fine. In an interview with the Los Angeles Times, he said, "I don’t trust those hoodlums; they want to run this company out of business. We are a privately held corporation. Our financial statements are our financial statements; they don’t belong to the people".

=== Early 1986 ===
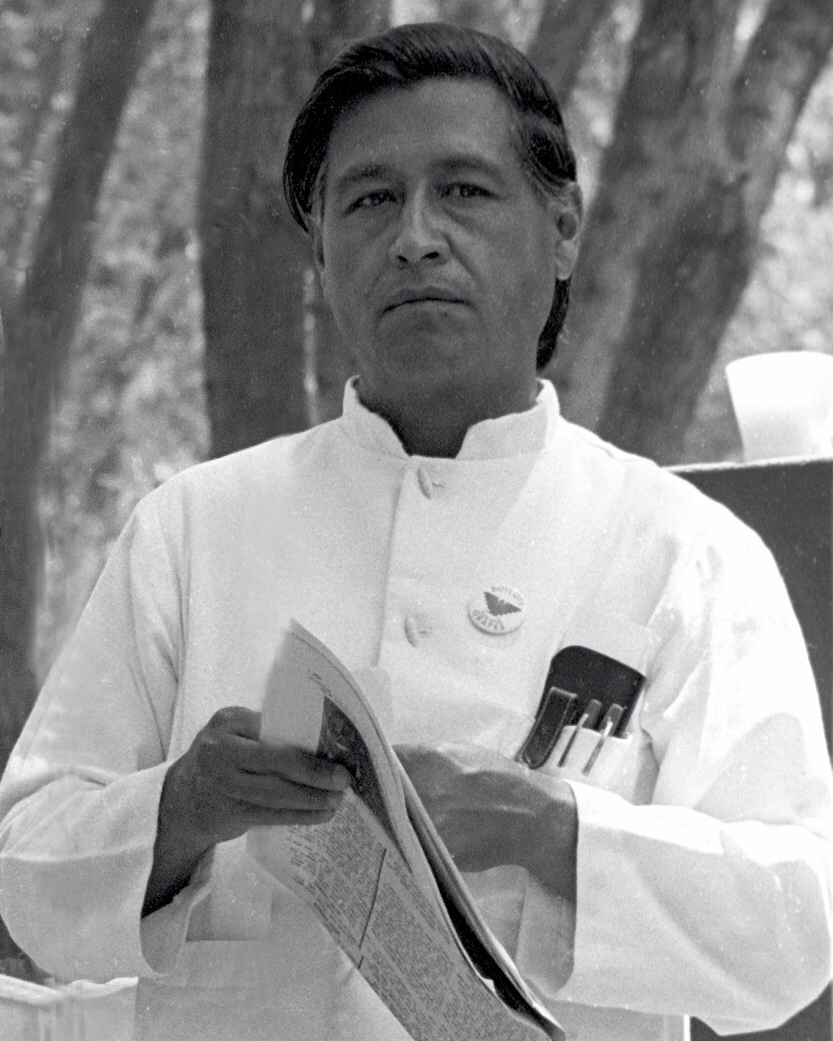
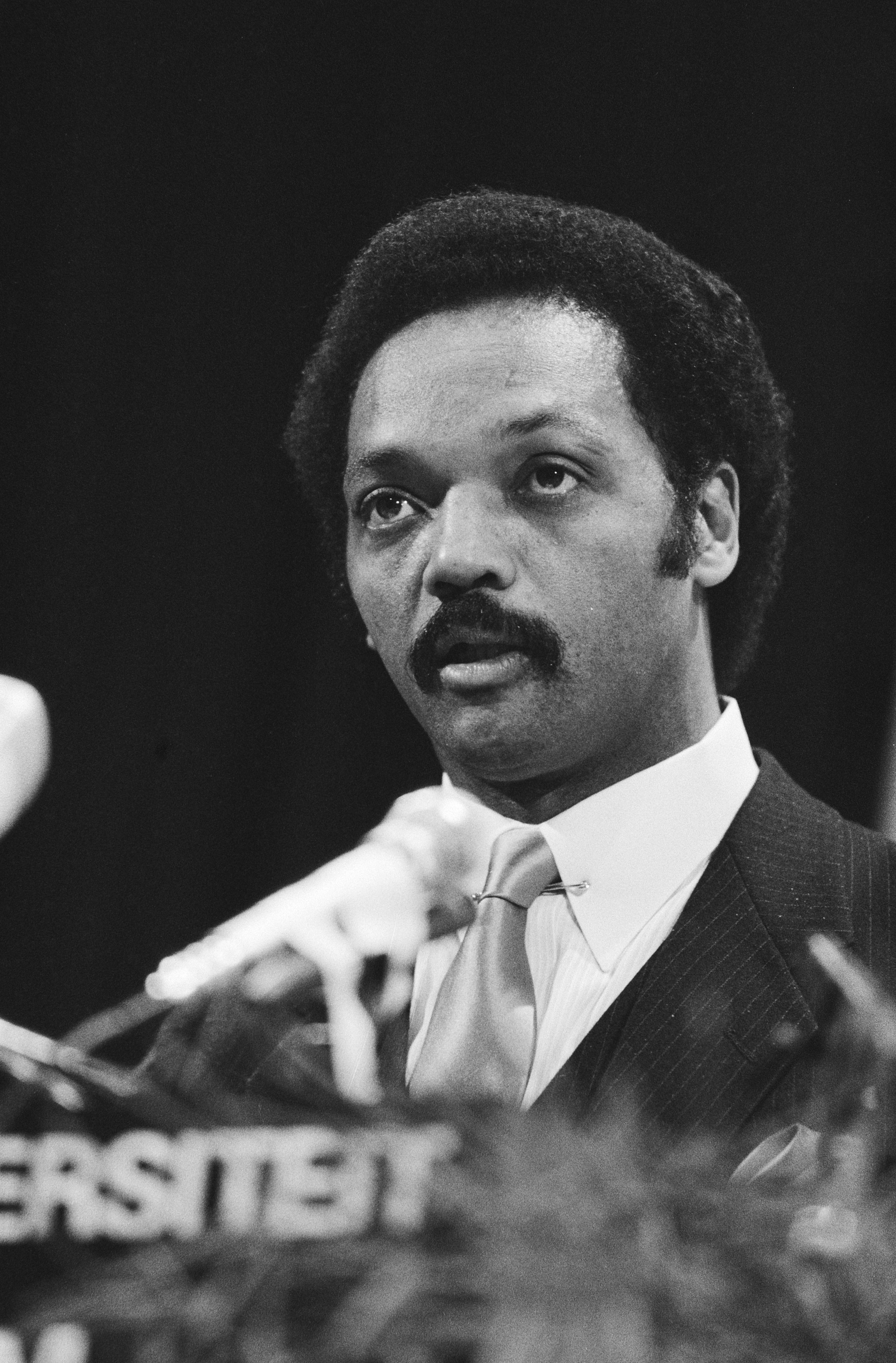
Civil rights activists Cesar Chavez (left) and Jesse Jackson were both vocal supporters of the strikers.

On International Women's Day (March 8), another rally was held that drew about 4,000 supporters. Political activist Jesse Jackson gave a speech at this event, and labor activist groups from the San Francisco Bay Area were well-represented. In a further show of solidarity among labor unions, on April 12, a representative of Local 912 spoke at a union rally in Austin, Minnesota, which was the site of the then-ongoing 1985–1986 Hormel strike, about the similarities between the two strikes. In addition to the Hormel strikers, Local 912 also tried to forge connections with other striking workers across the United States, including flight attendants who were on strike against Trans World Airlines. The Local 912 strikers held a joint rally with the flight attendants in San Jose, California, which was followed by a rally in Watsonville. Regarding the relationship-building with other striking workers, Betancourt stated, "we learned from them, what they did, what worked and didn't". On June 29, the Strike Committee held another large rally in Watsonville that drew over 4,000 attendees, with a significant number of supporters from northern California, including members of Chicano organizations, labor activists, and members of the United Farm Workers (UFW). Jackson, who by this time was seeking the presidency of the United States in the 1988 Democratic Party presidential primaries, again addressed the crowd, where he drew comparisons between the strike and the Selma to Montgomery marches during the civil rights movement. While the IBT had been reluctant to allow Jackson to speak, the Strike Committee was in full support. Jackson was one of the most vocal national advocates for the strikers, and members of his National Rainbow Coalition participated in picketing and other forms of support for the strike. In 1988, Betancourt served as a delegate for Jackson at the 1988 Democratic National Convention.

=== Local 912 targets Wells Fargo and company moves to decertify ===
Around mid-1986, Local 912 began to focus its attention on Wells Fargo for its role as a major financial backer of Watsonville Canning. This idea to put pressure on Wells Fargo had initially been proposed in November 1985 by UFW president and civil rights activist Cesar Chavez. In May 1986, the IBT voted to pressure Wells Fargo, allowing Local 912 to campaign for northern California labor unions and groups to withdraw their funds from Wells Fargo if the strike did not end on terms favorable to the union. Despite this vote, the international union did little in active campaigning against Wells Fargo, and that same month, the IBT voted to "undertake economic sanctions" against Watsonville Canning but stopped short of calling for a full boycott of Watsonville Canning products. In July 1986, Chavez met with strikers in Watsonville and pushed for a boycott against Wells Fargo. The Strike Committee's decision to meet with Chavez was against the wishes of the IBT, who were opposed to the UFW and had competed directly against that union in organizing farm workers in the 1970s.

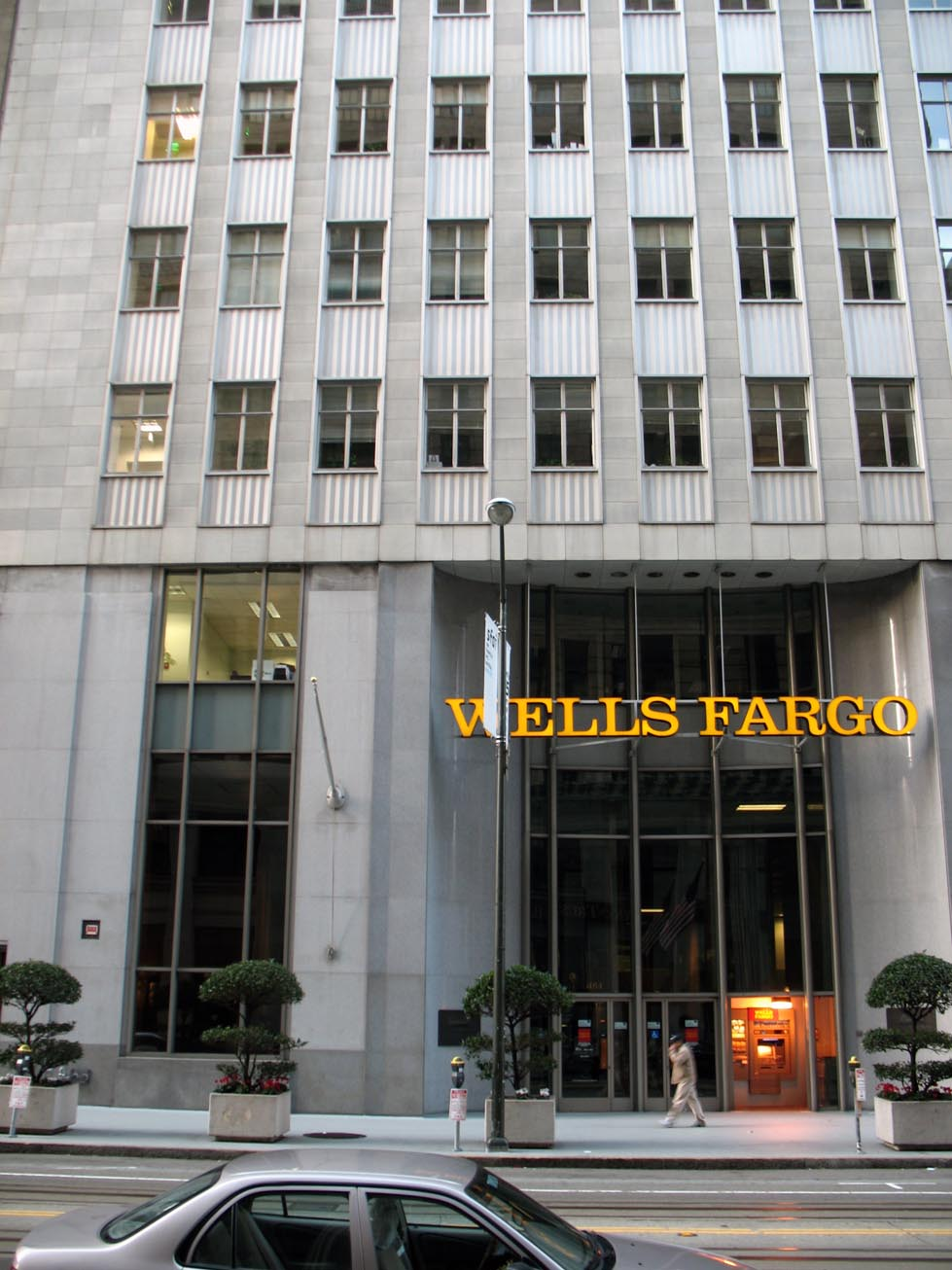
The headquarters for Wells Fargo in San Francisco

By this time, many of the strikers had taken on other jobs to support themselves, and some left Watsonville altogether. In August 1986, Console filed a petition with the National Labor Relations Board (NLRB) to decertify Local 912. A vote was scheduled that would include both striking union members and non-striking workers to decide whether Local 912 would continue to represent the workforce at Watsonville Canning. Local 912 began gathering union members, including those who had moved as far away as Texas and Mexico, to return to Watsonville to vote against decertification. Console, meanwhile, hired additional strikebreakers, sometimes doubling the number of workers on a line and hiring many for four-hour shifts in order to bolster the non-union vote. In a narrow election, the union members won out over the non-union employees, with the decertification effort failing in a 914–848.

=== Console goes into default, sells Watsonville Canning ===
Following the failed decertification vote, Console's financial situation deteriorated, and Watsonville Canning closed for 11 days before reopening with funding from a new $930,000 loan from Wells Fargo. By this point, Console was in excess of $30 million in debt. After this loan was approved, the Strike Committee began to push for the IBT to withdraw all their assets from Wells Fargo and began pushing for other IBT members to cancel their Wells Fargo accounts. However, while the IBT was unwilling to do this, the Chicano activist group MEChA began their own boycott of Wells Fargo, and in January 1987, eight Wells Fargo branches in northern California were targeted in a series of rallies, including one in the San Francisco Financial District. By September, the Los Angeles Times reported that the local had been waging a "corporate campaign" against Watsonville Canning's creditors for the past three months. That same month, the California Department of Food and Agriculture announced that they were opening an investigation into Watsonville Canning. By this point, Wells Fargo had loaned the company $23 million, and Watsonville Canning owed the bank $18 million, in addition to $7 million it owed to its growers. In December 1986, saddled with this debt, Console closed the plant down for one month. Two months later, Wells Fargo declared that Console was in default on his loans. At this point, in order to avoid bankruptcy, Console was forced to sell the plant.

In the aftermath of this, Wells Fargo sold the company, and new ownership of the plant was established in February 1987. The owner of this new company, named Norcal Frozen Foods, was a grower who was owed $5 million from Watsonville Canning, and 18 other growers who were owed money from Watsonville Canning were also part of this company. On February 28, 400 strikers elected a new negotiating committee to reach a deal with these new owners, and on Friday, March 6, a tentative agreement had been reached that would see an end to the strike. The deal would set hourly wages at $5.85, the industry standard, and was approved by both the negotiating committee and union leadership. However, many union members were opposed to the agreement because it would deny many of them medical benefits that they had had before the strike. Ultimately, the union members voted to wait one week before voting on whether or not to approve the contract. However, with the tentative agreement, the IBT announced that the strike was over, and as a result, they ended strike benefits, locked members who continued to strike out of the union hall, and stated that the union may go into trusteeship if strike activities did not cease. Without IBT approval, the members of Local 912 continued their labor dispute as a wildcat strike.

=== Hunger strike, religious pilgrimage, and end of the strike ===
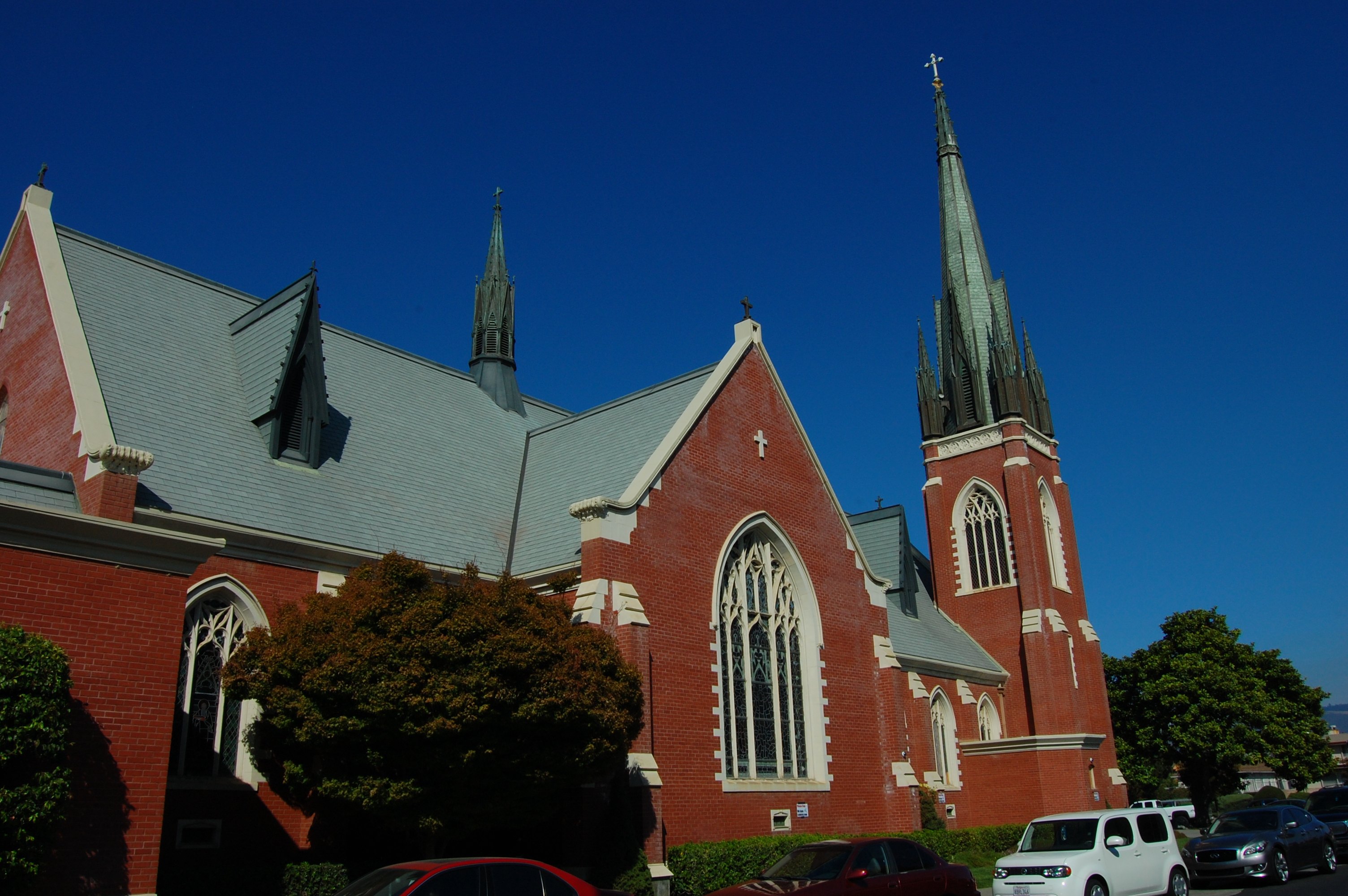
On March 9, several strikers walked on their knees from the plant to St. Patrick's Catholic Church to protest the lack of medical benefits.

In defiance of the IBT, six women, including Betancourt, initiated a hunger strike to protest the lack of medical benefits. The next day, the new plant owners stated that seniority rights would be revoked for any employees not reporting to work that Monday, March 9. On March 9, several hundred strikers protested outside the plant, demanding a reinstatement of medical benefits. Only a few dozen actually reported for work that day, effectively keeping the plant out of operation. The next day, the protesters outside of the plant began a religious procession, with more than 20 women and several men walking on their knees for four city blocks. The procession, which ended at St. Patrick's Catholic Church over 1 mile (1.6 km) from the plant, included prayers to Our Lady of Guadalupe and the leader of the procession chanting, "“As long as God is in Heaven, I will never give up". A special mass was held, with the local priest urging the strikers to continue the protest until their medical benefits were part of the contract. The pilgrimage was a tactic that had been used by UFW members during a strike about 15 years earlier. Later that night, contract negotiations between Local 912 and the company resumed.

On March 11, a new contract that preserved the workers' medical benefits was ratified, passing in a vote of 543–21. In addition to the medical benefits, the three-year contract workers maintained their seniority rights and received strike amnesty. With regards to pay, the workers accepted the new industry standard of $5.85, although an incentive pay plan could raise their hourly wages up to $6.61. Additionally, the contract allowed for negotiations on economic terms to start again in February 1988 and 1989. In celebration of the end of the strike, union members held a parade down Watsonville's Main Street. However, due to the wage reduction, many of the strikers viewed the outcome less as an outright victory and more as a compromise. According to Betancourt, "It was not what we wanted, but it was still a victory".

== Aftermath and legacy ==
=== Impact in Watsonville ===
In total, the IBT spent roughly $5 million in strike benefits over the course of the strike. According to municipal officials, the strike cost the city government about $1 million in police overtime and lost sales. A 1986 article from the Los Angeles Times stated that the strike had "devastated" Watsonville, highlighting the increased rates of violence and the impact on the local economy. That same article states that Watsonville had seen an uptick in domestic violence cases and rates of alcoholism, as well as an increase in prostitution. With a reduced income, many of the strikers saw their savings decline significantly, and some permanently relocated from Watsonville.

After the strike, the plant reopened with a skeleton crew composed of former strikers brought back on a seniority basis. While the owners of the plant provided their own produce for processing, other growers who had previously operated with Watsonville Canning had made deals with other plants during the strike, decreasing the overall output of the plant. Norcal Frozen Foods ultimately went out of business, and several hundred jobs were lost. In the years following the strike, more food processing plants in the city closed, with many of the companies relocating their operations to Mexico. In 1991, Green Giant relocated their facilities from Watsonville to Mexico, and more companies moved during the 1990s after the passage of the North American Free Trade Agreement. Within ten years of the strike, five of the city's eight frozen food plants had relocated, and by 2000, the former "frozen food capital of the world" was home to only one frozen food plant that employed about 400 people. As a result of the plant closures, the unemployment rate in Watsonville remained high compared to the rest of the state.

=== Political developments in Watsonville ===
The strike coincided with a federal court case, Gomez v. City of Watsonville, that dealt with the lack of Latino representation in Watsonville city politics. The court's decision led to an electoral district system that could better represent the ethnic demographics of the city, and in the following years, several Latinos were elected to city council and other government positions. In 1991, three Latinos were elected to the city council, and Oscar Rios, a union organizer from San Francisco who had moved to Watsonville during the strike, was later elected the city's first Latino mayor. Discussing the link between the strike and the shifting politics, Rios stated, "The strikers helped change the politics in our city and county". In 2017, some of the individuals who had been involved in the strike gathered at the Watsonville Public Library to commemorate the 30th anniversary of the strike.

=== Later analysis and legacy ===
The strike is noted for being one of the largest and most important in the United States during the 1980s. Academic Erik Davis called the strike "one of the most important labor campaigns of the 1980s", while activist Kim Moody called the event "one of the most important strikes against concessions" during that time. Moody also listed the strike as one of the decade's largest, occurring during a time when strikes were becoming more uncommon, but the length of strikes was increasing. Labor historian Jeremy Brecher stated that the strike was one of the "most important" strikes of the time, alongside the Hormel strike and the Pittston Coal strike. However, unlike many of the other long labor strikes that occurred during this time, the Watsonville strike was one of the only successful ones, with an article in the Northwest Labor Press calling it "a rare union victory during an era of union-busting". Political activist Sharon Smith noted it as one of the few exceptions to the trend of strike failures, and several sources noted that the solidarity of the strikers was crucial to the strike's victory. As multiple sources have noted, none of the strikers crossed the picket line for the duration of the strike. The strike is also seen as an important moment in the history of Latino relations in the United States. A 1996 book co-written by economist Teresa Amott called the strike "one of the most important recent episodes in Chicana labor history", and it is seen as one of the major strikes in the American southwest that was led by Chicanos, alongside the Arizona copper mine strike of 1983 and the 1938 pecan shellers' strike in San Antonio. Speaking further of the relation between this strike and older strikes, labor historian Myrna Cherkoss Donahoe compared the militant nature of the rank-and-file Watsonville strikers to those of the CIO strikes of the 1930s.

== Sources ==
- Adams, Florence (2000). "The Beginning of the Push from At-Large to Single-Member Districts: Watsonville and Pomona". Latinos and Local Representation: Changing Realities, Emerging Theories. New York City: Garland Publishing. ISBN 978-1-317-77629-1.
- Alaniz, Yolanda; Cornish, Megan (2008). Viva la Raza: A History of Chicano Identity and Resistance (First ed.). Seattle: Red Letter Press. ISBN 978-0-932323-28-6.
- Amott, Teresa L.; Matthaei, Julie A. (1996). Race, Gender, and Work: A Multi-cultural Economic History of Women in the United States (Revised ed.). Boston: South End Press. ISBN 978-0-89608-537-4.
- Bardacke, Frank (October 1995). "The Workers, United". El Andar. Introduction by John Speyer. Archived from the original on August 18, 2021.
- Bernstein, Harry (September 10, 1986). "Ex-Teamster Leader Bolsters Union's Foes". Los Angeles Times. Archived from the original on January 22, 2022.
- Brecher, Jeremy (1997). Strike! (Revised and Updated ed.). Cambridge, Massachusetts: South End Press. ISBN 978-1-62963-808-9.
- Brown-Coronel, Margie (2006). "Watsonville Strike". In Ruiz, Vicki L.; Korrol, Virginia Sánchez (eds.). Latinas in the United States: A Historical Encyclopedia. Vol. 1. Bloomington, Indiana: Indiana University Press. pp. 805–806. ISBN 978-0-253-11169-2.
- Castillo, Ana (2014). "The 1986 Watsonville Women's Strike: A Case of Mexicana/Chicana Activism". Massacre of the Dreamers: Essays on Xicanisma. Foreword by Clarissa Pinkola Estés (20th Anniversary Updated ed.). Albuquerque, New Mexico: University of New Mexico Press. pp. 39–64. ISBN 978-0-8263-5359-7.
- Corwin, Miles (September 14, 1986). "Canning Workers' Bitter Strike Devastates Lives, Economy of Watsonville". Los Angeles Times. Archived from the original on September 27, 2020.
- Davis, Erik (2006). The Visionary State: A Journey Through California's Spiritual Landscape. Photographs by Michael Rauner. San Francisco: Chronicle Books. ISBN 978-0-8118-4835-0.
- Donahoe, Myrna Cherkoss (2009). "The Watsonville Cannery Strike, 1985–1987". In Brenner, Aaron; Day, Benjamin; Ness, Immanuel (eds.). The Encyclopedia of Strikes in American History. Armonk, New York: M. E. Sharpe. pp. 444–448. ISBN 978-1-317-45707-7.
- Erlich, Reese (December 10, 1985). "California Teamsters election tests influence of women, Hispanics". The Christian Science Monitor. Christian Science Publishing Society. ISSN 0882-7729. Archived from the original on September 15, 2015.
- Flores, William V. (1997). "Mujeres en Huelga: Cultural Citizenship and Gender Empowerment in a Cannery Strike". In Flores, William V.; Benmayor, Rina (eds.). Latino Cultural Citizenship: Claiming Identity, Space, and Rights. Boston: Beacon Press. pp. 210–254. ISBN 978-0-8070-4635-7.
- Gutiérrez y Muhs, Gabriella; Eldredge, Veronica (2019). "Gómez, Cruz". In Lavariega, Jessica L. (ed.). Latinos in the American Political System: An Encyclopedia of Latinos as Voters, Candidates, and Office Holders. Vol. I and II: A–Z. Santa Barbara, California: ABC-Clio. pp. 208–210. ISBN 978-1-4408-5347-0.
- Kwik, Phil (May 1, 1986). "Leaders of Hormel Strike Arrested; International Holds Trusteeship Hearing". Labor Notes. Archived from the original on November 25, 2021.
- Lindsey, Robert (January 1, 1986). "Eating Patterns Affect Packers Strike". The New York Times. p. 6. ISSN 0362-4331. Archived from the original on May 24, 2015.
- Lindsey, Robert (January 27, 1987). "Packing Plant Strike: Arduous Battle to Survive". The New York Times. p. 14. ISSN 0362-4331. Archived from the original on November 2, 2017.
- Manning, Caitlin; Michaelson, Louis (Winter 1985–1986). "Fire Against Ice: California Frozen Food Workers on Strike". Processed World (15): 23–28. ISSN 0735-9381.
- McIntosh, Don (January 3, 2017). "Song of the Stubborn One Thousand". Northwest Labor Press. Archived from the original on May 7, 2021.
- Mize, Ronald L.; Swords, Alicia C. S. (2011). Consuming Mexican Labor: From the Bracero Program to NAFTA. Toronto: University of Toronto Press. doi:10.3138/9781442601598. ISBN 978-1-4426-0157-4.
- "Strike ends at canning and frozen food company". Monthly Labor Review. 110 (6). Bureau of Labor Statistics: 58. June 1987.
- Moody, Kim (1988). An Injury to All: The Decline of American Unionism. New York City: Verso Books. ISBN 978-1-78478-783-7.
- Moody, Kim (2014). In Solidarity: Essays on Working-Class Organization in the United States. Chicago: Haymarket Books. ISBN 978-1-60846-458-6.
- Muñoz Jr., Carlos (2007). Youth, Identity, Power: The Chicano Movement (Revised and Expanded ed.). New York City: Verso Books. ISBN 978-1-84467-142-7.
- Murolo, Priscilla; Chitty, A. B. (2001). From the Folks Who Brought You the Weekend: An Illustrated History of Labor in the United States. Illustrations by Joe Sacco. New York City: The New Press. ISBN 978-1-62097-449-0.
- "Concessions at Issue in Strike of Food Plants". The New York Times. October 20, 1985. p. 28. ISSN 0362-4331. Archived from the original on November 21, 2017.
- Paulson, Linda Dailey (2004). "Watsonville Canning Strike". In Schlager, Neil (ed.). St. James Encyclopedia of Labor History Worldwide: Major Events in Labor History and Their Impact. Vol. 2: N–Z. With introductions by Willie Thompson and Daniel Nelson. Detroit: St. James Press. pp. 410–413. ISBN 978-1-55862-561-7.
- Phillips, Steve (2016). Brown Is the New White: How the Demographic Revolution Has Created a New American Majority. New York City: The New Press. ISBN 978-1-62097-325-7.
- Romney, Charles W. (2016). Rights Delayed: The American State and the Defeat of Progressive Unions, 1935–1950. Oxford: Oxford University Press. doi:10.1093/acprof:oso/9780190250294.001.0001. ISBN 978-0-19-025029-4.
- Shapiro, Peter (November 2, 2016a). "Nothing to Lose". Jacobin. Archived from the original on May 6, 2021.
- Smith, Sharon (2006). Subterranean Fire: A History of Working-Class Radicalism in the United States. Chicago: Haymarket Books. ISBN 978-1-60846-918-5.
- Takash, Paule Cruz (1997). "Breaking Barriers to Representation: Chicana/Latina Elected Officials in California". In Cohen, Cathy J.; Jones, Kathleen B.; Tronto, Joan C. (eds.). Women Transforming Politics: An Alternative Reader. New York City: New York University Press. pp. 412–434. ISBN 978-0-8147-1558-1.
- Tisbe, Allison (October 20, 2017). "Leaving a Legacy". City on a Hill Press. Additional reporting by Alonso Hernandez. Archived from the original on November 24, 2020.
- Todd, Michael (September 11, 2018) [March 11, 2017]. "Watsonville canning strikers gather for 30th anniversary meeting". Santa Cruz Sentinel. Digital First Media. Archived from the original on January 22, 2022.
- Trumpbour, John; Bernard, Elaine (2009). "Unions and Latinos: Mutual Transformation". In Suárez-Orozco, Marcelo M.; Páez, Mariela M. (eds.). Latinos: Remaking America. With commentary from Merilee S. Grindle (Updated ed.). Berkeley, California: University of California Press. pp. 126–149. ISBN 978-0-520-25827-3.
- Weber, Brandon (2018). "The Watsonville, California, Cannery Strike". Class War, USA: Dispatches from Workers' Struggles in American History. Chicago: Haymarket Books. ISBN 978-1-60846-871-3.
- Zavella, Patricia (1997). "The Tables are Turned: Immigration, Poverty, and Social Conflict in California Communities". In Perea, Juan F. (ed.). Immigrants Out!: The New Nativism and the Anti-Immigrant Impulse in the United States. New York City: New York University Press. pp. 136–162. ISBN 978-0-8147-6642-2.
- Zavella, Patricia (2002). "Engendering Transnationalism in Food Processing: Peripheral Vision on Both Sides of the U.S.–Mexican Border". In Vélez-Ibáñez, Carlos G.; Sampaio, Anna (eds.). Transnational Latina/o Communities: Politics, Processes, and Cultures. Latin American Perspectives in the Classroom. With Manolo González-Estay. Lanham, Maryland: Rowman & Littlefield. pp. 225–246. ISBN 978-0-7425-1702-8.
- Zavella, Patricia (2011). I'm Neither Here nor There: Mexicans' Quotidian Struggles with Migration and Poverty. Durham, North Carolina: Duke University Press. doi:10.1515/9780822394259. ISBN 978-0-8223-5035-4.
- Zavella, Patricia (2020). "The Watsonville Cannery Strike, 1985–1987". In Berger, Dan; Hobson, Emily K. (eds.). Remaking Radicalism: A Grassroots Documentary Reader of the United States, 1973–2001. Athens, Georgia: University of Georgia Press. pp. 109–111. ISBN 978-0-8203-5727-0.
- Zinn, Howard (2003). A People's History of the United States. Teaching materials by Kathy Emery and Ellen Reeves (Abridged Teaching ed.). New York City: The New Press. ISBN 978-1-56584-826-9.
