= Roger Taylor =

Roger Taylor may refer to:

- Roger Taylor (Queen drummer) (born 1949), English drummer for Queen
- Roger Taylor (Duran Duran drummer) (born 1960), drummer for Duran Duran
- Roger Taylor (author) (1938–2023), British author of epic fantasy Hawklan series
- Roger Taylor (college president), former president of Knox College in Galesburg, Illinois
- Roger Taylor (tennis) (born 1941), British tennis player
- Roger Taylor (American football) (born 1958), American football player
- Roger Taylor (photographic historian) (born 1940), English curator and photographic historian

== See also ==
- Roger Tayler (1929–1997), British astronomer
