= Bardacke =

Bardacke is a surname. Notable people with the surname include:

- Frank Bardacke, American activist and writer
- Paul Bardacke (born 1944), American attorney and politician
