= Teresa Amott =

American economist and academic administrator

19th President of Knox College
- Incumbent
- Assumed office July 2011
- Preceded by: Roger Taylor

Personal details
- Education: Smith College (BA in economics); Boston College (PhD in economics)

Teresa Amott is an American economist and academic administrator, who served as the 19th president of Knox College in Galesburg, Illinois.

== Career ==
Prior to serving as president of Knox College, Amott was a professor of economics at Wellesley College, the University of Massachusetts Boston, University of Massachusetts Amherst, Gettysburg College, and the Hobart and William Smith Colleges. She was also a visiting professor of women's studies at Harvard Divinity School. Amott worked as a policy advisor on the Jesse Jackson 1988 presidential campaign. Amott has worked as an editor for Dollars & Sense, an economics publication. From 1988 to 1995, she was a member of the board of Bread for the World, a Christian advocacy organization.

She served as a professor of economics and chair of the economics department at Bucknell University. Amott was selected to serve as the president of Knox College in 2011.

In March 2020, Amott announced her intention to retire as president in June 2021.

== Selected works ==
- Race, gender, and work : a multicultural economic history of women in the United States
- Caught in the crisis : women and the U.S. economy today, 1993
- Women and welfare reform : women's poverty, women's opportunities, and women's welfare : conference proceedings, transcript of presentations and discussion, 1994
