= Roger Taylor (photographic historian) =

English curator and historian

Professor Roger Taylor MVO
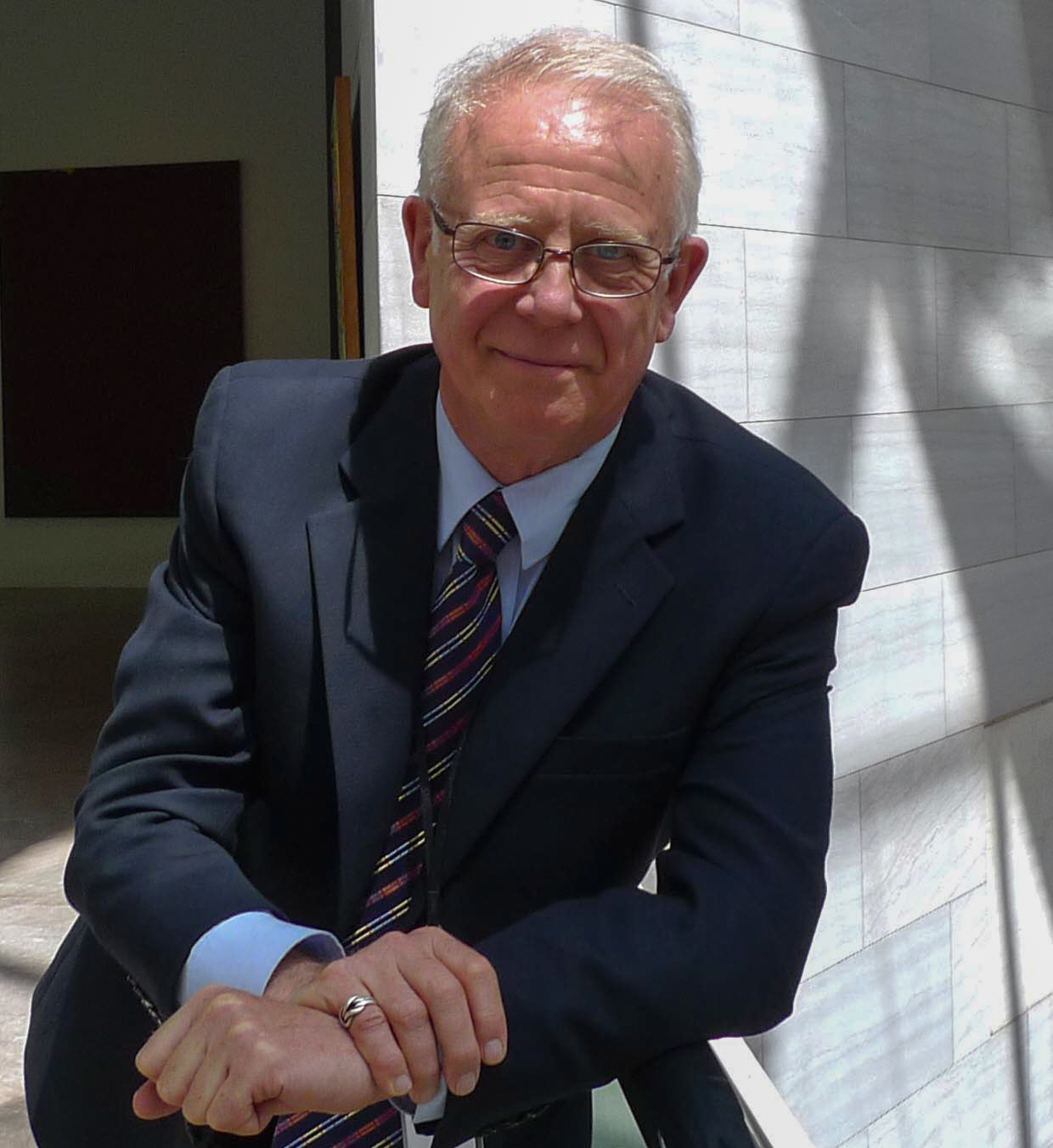
- Born: 31 October 1940 (age 86); Stockport, Cheshire, England
- Occupation: Photographic history

Roger Taylor, MVO (born 31 October 1940) is a curator, photographic historian, and educator specialising in nineteenth century British photography and its social and cultural history. He is Professor Emeritus of Photographic History at De Montfort University.

== Early life and education ==
Roger Taylor was born on 31 October 1940 in Stockport, Cheshire, England. He attended Stockport Grammar School from 1946 to 1951 and King's School, Macclesfield, between 1951 and 1957. After leaving school, in 1957 Taylor was apprenticed to Rex Lowden, an industrial and commercial photographer in Manchester, where he was formally trained in photography, taking City & Guilds evening classes at Manchester College of Science and Technology between 1957 and 1960.

His education continued at Derby College of Art where he joined the college in 1966, initially as a technician and part-time lecturer prior to taking the final year of the course. In 1967 he secured a First Class Diploma in Creative Photography, and this led to his appointment as full-time lecturer at Sheffield School of Art where he remained until 1983. During his tenure he progressed to senior lecturer and finally, in 1981, Director of Studies for the BA [Hons] Fine Art course.

Encouraged by the urban historian Jim Dyos, Taylor took a sabbatical to attend the post-graduate course in Victorian Studies at Leicester University, in 1974 to 1976. This experience fundamentally shaped his approach to photographic history. He gained a MA in Victorian Studies in 1977 for his thesis on George Washington Wilson.

It was during his time at Sheffield and Leicester that Taylor began to develop his interest in photographic history and in 1983 he became an associate lecturer as this allowed him to work independently as a freelance curator, notably for The Royal Collection and the Howard and Jane Ricketts Collection.

As the series editor for World Microfilms Publications between 1978 and 1981, he was closely involved with the development of a number of early research resources in photographic history. Taylor encouraged the inclusion of 19th century photographic journals, scientific texts, and significant collections of photographs. These were microfilmed and made commercially available, principally to academic institutions throughout the world, where they underpinned a whole generation of research.

== Curatorial and academic career ==
In 1985 he was appointed as the Curator of the Kodak Museum, at the National Museum of Photography, Film and Television, now the National Science and Media Museum, in Bradford. During his tenure Taylor was instrumental in the acquisition of several important collections, including Tony Ray Jones; Andor Kraszna-Krausz; George Rodger, Photographic Advertising Ltd, and the Zoltan Glass Archive. In 1990 he was made Senior Curator of Photographs and Head of Research Development.

Following early retirement in 1996 Taylor devoted his attention to the evolution of early photography in Britain, and was awarded a number research fellowships and scholarships in America and Canada in support of this. In 2002, he was appointed Senior Research Fellow at De Montfort University, became a professor in 2005, and Emeritus in 2009. During his time at De Montfort he edited three online research resources for photographic historians.

As an independent advisor Taylor was invited to help secure the future of three collections for the public domain: the Fay Godwin collection, for the British Library in 2007; The Talbot Collection for the British Library in 2009; and the Kodak Research Library, for De Montfort University library's Special Collections in 2009.

Drawing on his museum and curatorial experience Taylor also served in a number of specialist advisory roles. These include membership of the Bodleian Library's Talbot Catalogue Raisonné advisory board.

Taylor has written extensively on the social history of Victorian photography, and curated exhibitions in nineteenth century photography.

== Awards and fellowships ==
He was awarded the J. Dudley Johnson Award for sustained contribution to the field of photographic history by the Royal Photographic Society in 2007. In 2010 he was invited as Edmund J. Safra Visiting Professor at CASVA, National Gallery of Art, Washington. The University of Derby awarded him an Hon DFA in 2014. He was made a member of the Royal Victorian Order (MVO) 'for services to the Royal Collection' in the 2020 Queen's Birthday Honours list.

== Other projects and activities ==
As a personal project in 2009 Taylor was involved with establishing ‘The Gallery on the Green’ in a refurbished British Telecom telephone box in Settle, North Yorkshire. As a curator of the gallery, he attracted a wide range of contributors, including well-known photographers and collectors.

== Selected publications ==
=== Books ===
- Roger Taylor, Samuel Bourne, 1834-1912: photographic views in India. [exhibition catalogue]. Sheffield, Sheffield City Polytechnic, 1980.
- Roger Taylor, George Washington Wilson: artist and photographer 1823-93. Aberdeen: Aberdeen University Press, 1981.
- Frances Dimond and Roger Taylor, Crown & Camera: the royal family and photography 1842-1910. Harmondsworth: Penguin Publications, 1987.
- Roger Taylor, with Michael Bakewell, Some Other Occupation, Lewis Carroll and Photography, British Council, 1998.
- Roger Taylor. Photographs exhibited in Britain 1839-1865: a compendium of photographers and their works / Photographies exposées en Grande-Bretagne de 1839-1865: répertoire des photographes et des leurs oeuvres,, Ottawa: National Gallery of Canada, 2002.
- Roger Taylor and Edward Wakeling, Lewis Carroll, photographer: the Princeton University library albums. Princeton: Princeton University Press, 2002.
- Roger Taylor, with Gordon Baldwin, Malcolm Daniel, Sarah Greenough, All the mighty world. The photographs of Roger Fenton, 1852-1860. New Haven and London: Yale University Press, 2004.
- Roger Taylor, with Larry Schaaf, Impressed by light: British photographs from paper negatives, 1840-1860. London: Yale University Press, 2007.
- Roger Taylor, with Dominique de Font-Réaulx, L'image révélée: premières photographies sur papier en Grande-Bretagne, (1840-1860), Paris: Chaudun: Musée d'Orsay, 2008.
- Roger Taylor and Crispin Branfoot, Captain Linnaeus Tripe: photographer of India and Burma, 1852-1860, Munich: DelMonico, National Gallery of Art, Washington, DC, 2014.
- Roger Taylor, George Washington Wilson: artist and photographer 1823-93, With an introduction by Brian May, London Stereoscopic Company, 2018.

=== Articles and papers ===
- Roger Taylor, 'Priority & Precedence, The Graphic Society and Photography, 1839', History of Photography, Vol 23, 1, Spring, 1999.
- Roger Taylor, ‘Introduction’, in Sun pictures. Catalogue Ten. British paper negatives, 1839-1864, New York, Hans P Kraus Jr, 2001.
- Roger Taylor and Dr Mike Ware, 'Pilgrims of the Sun, The chemical evolution of the calotype, 1840-1852', History of Photography, vol 27, 4, Winter 2003.

=== Photographic history resources ===
- The Victorian Photograph Collection at Windsor Castle, World Microfilm Publications, 1979.
- Rare Books and Publications on Photography,World Microfilm Publications, 1979.
- The Photograph Collection, The Victoria & Albert Museum, World Microfilm Publications, 1980
- Exhibitions of the Royal Photographic Society 1870-1915. Catalogue records from the annual exhibitions, 2008.
- Photographic Exhibitions in Britain 1839-1865, Records from Victorian Exhibition Catalogues. Hosted by De Montfort University.
- Roger Fenton’s Crimean letterbooks, 2013.

== Curated exhibitions ==
- Crown and Camera, with Frances Dimond, Queen's Gallery, London, 1987.
- The Story of Popular Photography, displays at the National Museum of Photography, Film and Television, Bradford, based on the Kodak Museum collection, 1989.
- Some Other Occupation: Lewis Carroll and Photograph, 1998.
- Landmarks: The Photographs of Fay Godwin at the Barbican, 2001.
- Impressed by light: British photographs from paper negatives, New York: Metropolitan Museum of Art; Washington: National Gallery of Art.
- L'image révélée : premières photographies sur papier en Grande-Bretagne, (1840-1860), Musée d'Orsay, 2008.
- Captain Linnaeus Tripe: photographer of India and Burma, 1852-1860, National Gallery of Art, Washington, 2014, and the Victoria and Albert Museum.
