= Northwest Labor Press =

Trade union newspaper published in Portland, Oregon

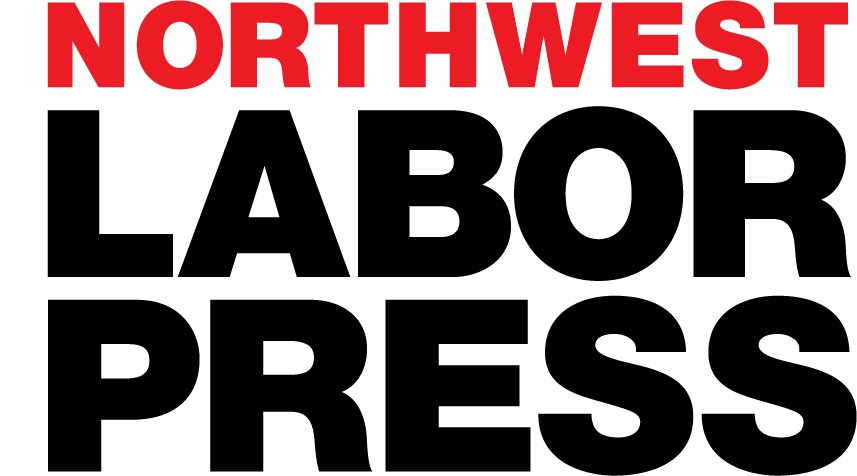
- Type: Biweekly newspaper
- Owner: Oregon Labor Press Publishing Company
- Founded: 1900; 126 years ago
- Language: English
- City: Portland, Oregon
- Website: nwlaborpress.org

The Northwest Labor Press is a newspaper which covers the American labor movement in the Pacific Northwest. It was known as the Portland Labor Press from 1900 to 1915, the Oregon Labor Press until 1986, the Oregon/Washington Labor Press until 1987, and by its present name since then.

The newspaper covers union organizing campaigns, contract negotiations, strikes, and news about labor unions in Oregon and southwest Washington.

The target audience for the journal comprises workers, and union leaders and members. Its reporting is sometimes picked up in other publications.

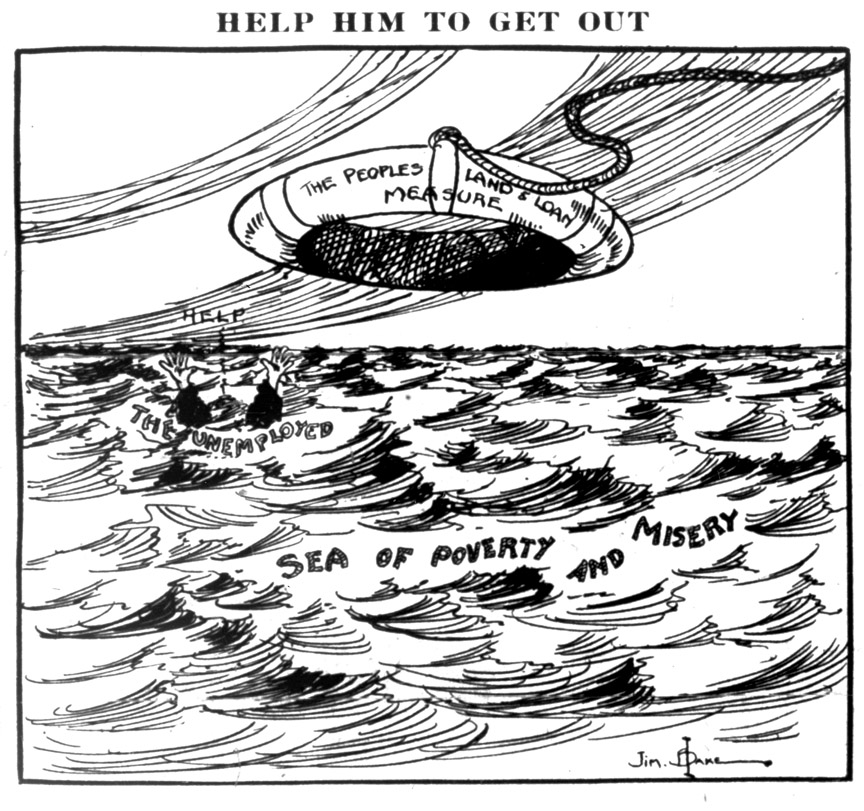
Editorial cartoon published in the Labor Press in 1916.

The Northwest Labor Press was founded in 1900, and is one of the oldest trade union publications in the United States. It is published biweekly by the Oregon Labor Press Publishing Company, a non-profit organization co-owned by 20 local labor unions and the Oregon AFL-CIO.

== See also ==
- Portland Reporter, a daily newspaper published by striking newspaper workers 1960–64
- Journalism in Oregon
