= Sharon Smith (writer) =

American historian

Sharon Smith (born 1956) is an American socialist and anti-racist writer and activist. She is the author of Subterranean Fire: A History of Working-Class Radicalism in the United States and of Women and Socialism: Essays on Women's Liberation.

Women and Socialism, published by Haymarket Books in 2005, is a collection of essays on the origin of women's oppression, the struggle for abortion rights, the political trajectory of mainstream feminism, the place of women in Islam, and the ways socialism could, in Smith's view, overcome women's oppression. In the course of some of these essays, Smith takes up an argument she had previously made in a lengthy article in International Socialism, arguing against identity politics, which she views as a mistaken approach for feminism or any other movement against oppression. In a new "fully revised and updated edition" Women and Socialism: Class, Race, and Capital, 2015, she expands on "social reproduction theory".

Subterranean Fire, published by Haymarket in 2006, is a history of the US labor movement from the late 19th century through the 21st, focusing on the role of its left wing.
