= Patricia Zavella =

Anthropologist and professor at the University of California

Patricia Zavella is an American anthropologist and professor at the University of California, Santa Cruz in the Latin American and Latino Studies department. She has spent a career advancing Latina and Chicana feminism through her scholarship, teaching, and activism. She was president of the Association of Latina and Latino Anthropologists and has served on the executive board of the American Anthropological Association. In 2016, Zavella received the American Anthropological Association's award from the Committee on Gender Equity in Anthropology to recognize her career studying gender discrimination. The awards committee said Zavella's career accomplishments advancing the status of women, and especially Latina and Chicana women have been exceptional. She has made critical contributions to understanding how gender, race, nation, and class intersect in specific contexts through her scholarship, teaching, advocacy, and mentorship. Zavella's research focuses on migration, gender and health in Latina/o communities, Latino families in transition, feminist studies, and ethnographic research methods. She has worked on many collaborative projects, including an ongoing partnership with Xóchitl Castañeda where she wrote four articles, some in English and others in Spanish. In 2010, the Society for the Anthropology of North America awarded Zavella the Distinguished Career Achievement in the Critical Study of North America Award. She has published many books including, most recently, I'm Neither Here Nor There, Mexicans' Quotidian Struggles with Migration and Poverty (Duke University Press, 2011), which focuses on working-class Mexican Americans' struggle for agency and identity in Santa Cruz County.

== Early life ==
Patricia Zavella was born in 1949 in Tampa, Florida, the oldest of twelve children in a working-class family and often cared for her siblings. Her parents were both born in the United States and the primary language spoken in her family was English. Her father worked in the Air Force; they moved frequently when she was a child. Zavella was often one of very few Mexican-American children in the schools she attended. Zavella's teachers were often amazed at her stellar performance in the classroom. At the age of ten, her family settled in Ontario in Southern California where there were more Mexican-Americans in her classrooms; this triggered her critical thinking about race relations and the Spanish language. In 1968, Zavella went to Chaffey Community College in Alta Loma, near her family's home. There she was influenced by both Dolores Huerta and Cesar Chavez and became involved with the Chicano/a movement. She became a student activist, supporting some of the first classes in Mexican-American studies. Her recollections of the early days of the movement are a vital part of this oral history. In August 1970, Zavella participated in the Chicano Moratorium along with approximately 25,000 other activists who protested in East Los Angeles against the Vietnam War. She began to claim an identity as a Chicana when she joined MECA [Movimiento Estudiantil Chicano de Aztlán].

Zavella completed her BA in anthropology at Pitzer College. Afterward, she attended graduate school at UC Berkeley, where she earned her PhD in anthropology in 1982. Her dissertation Women's Work in Chicano Families: Cannery Workers of the Santa Clara Valley developed into her first book. There was an influence in social movements on Zavella's identity formation and search for community-centered knowledge. Zavella was one of the first scholars to analyze the intersections of race, gender, and class for Chicana women workers, a research approach that emerged from feminist of color activisms of the late 1960s and 1970s.

== Education and career ==
- BA in anthropology at Pitzer College (one of the Claremont Colleges)
- Graduated school at UC Berkeley, and there she earned her PhD in anthropology in 1982.
- Before she came to University of California, Santa Cruz, Zavella taught courses at California State University at Hayward, University of California Berkeley, and University of California Santa Barbara and worked as a postdoc researcher at Stanford University with the Center for Chicano Research.
- She was hired by UCSC's community studies program in 1983, she was first hired for a temporary position however after a year for a permanent position. Later she transferred to the Latin American and Latino Studies department.
- From 1999 to 2003 she directed the Chicano and Latino Research Center and was a founder of both the BA and PhD program in the Latin American and Latino Studies Department at UC Santa Cruz. She has also served as UCSC's representative to the UC Committee on Latino Research.

== Employments ==
- 1977: Instructor, Sociology Department, California State University, Hayward
- 1980: Lecturer, Chicano Studies Program, University of California, Berkeley
- 1980–1981: Lecturer, Chicano studies department, University of California, Santa Barbara
- 1983–1989: Assistant Professor, Community Studies Department, UC Santa Cruz
- 1989–1993: Associate Professor, Community Studies Department, UC Santa Cruz
- 1993–2001: Professor, Community Studies Department, UC Santa Cruz
- 1994–1997: Chair, Community Studies Department, UC Santa Cruz
- 1999–2003: Director, Chicano/Latino Research Center, UC Santa Cruz
- 2001–: Professor, Latin American and Latino Studies Department, UC Santa Cruz
- 2007–2011: Chair, Latin American and Latino Studies Department, UC Santa Cruz

== Awards, recognition and grants ==
- American Anthropological Association's Committee on Gender Equity in Anthropology Award, 2016
- Association of Latina and Latino Anthropologists 2016 ALLA Distinguished Career Award
- The Society for the Anthropology of North America Distinguished Career Achievement in the Critical Study of North America Award, 2010
- Honorable Mention for the 2009–10 Excellence in Teaching Award, 2010
- Faculty Research Lecture by the Academic Senate, University of California Santa Cruz, 2009
- Scholar of the Year by the Chicano/Latino Research Center, University of California, Santa Cruz, 2006
- NACCS Scholar of the Year by the National Association for Chicana and Chicano Studies, 2003.
- The Gustavus Myers Center for the Study of Bigotry and Human Rights Outstanding Book Award of 2002 for Telling to Live: Latina Feminist Testimonios, co-authored with The Latina Feminist Group.
- Named one of the 100 Most Influential Hispanics, Hispanic Business Magazine, October 2002.
- Recognition as one of the "leaders who contribute to the farmworker and Latino communities", Salud Para La Gente community-based health center, Festival of Leadership, June 10, 1995.
- Presidential Professor, Sociology and Anthropology Departments, University of Michigan, Ann Arbor, fall 1994.
- Distinguished Visiting Scholar, Chicana/Latina Research Center, University of California, Davis, spring 1994.
- Profiled in Notable Hispanic American Women, Diane Telgen and Jim Kamp, Eds. Detroit: Gale Research, Inc., 1993.
- Winner of the National Women's Political Caucus, Distinguished Achievement Award, Celebrating Women Writers, Bay Area Chapter, for Women's Work and Chicano Families: Cannery Workers of the Santa Clara Valley, 1991.
- Regent Junior Faculty Fellowship Award, UC Santa Cruz, 1987–88 Committee on Research Grants, UC Santa Cruz, 1984–89
- Affirmative Action Award, UC Santa Cruz, 1986–87, 1985–86
- Award for contribution to leadership to the Latino community of the Pomona Valley, The First Annual Pomona Valley Latino Testimonial Awards, 1984.
- Postdoctoral Fellowship, Stanford Center for Chicano Research, Stanford University: 1982–83 "All But Dissertation" Fellowship, Chicano Studies Department, University of California, Santa Barbara: 1980–81
- National Institute for Mental Health Traineeship through the Institute for the Study of Social Change, University of California, Berkeley: 1979–80; 1974–75
- Ford Foundation, Graduate Fellowship Program for Mexican Americans: 1975–79 Graduate Fellowship Program

== Research and interests ==
Zavella's scholarship has been recognized as providing a base and a foundation for Latina and Chicana feminist studies. She is also interested in the movement for reproductive justice, family, poverty, sexuality, transnational migration by Mexicans, Chicana-Latina studies, feminism, ethnographic research methods. Her affiliations are Research Center for the Americas, Feminist Studies Department, Anthropology Department, Critical Race and Ethnic Studies, Community Studies Program. Her teaching experience cover the topics of migration, gender and health in Latina/o communities, Latino families in transition, Latina/o ethnographic practice, criminalizing the poor, migration, borders and borderlands.

== Publications ==
=== Publications ===
- The Impact of "Sun Belt Industrialization" on Chicanas, 1984
- Work-related Networks and Household Organization Among Chicana Cannery Workers, 1984
- Women's Work and Chicano Families: Cannery Workers of the Santa Clara Valley, 1987
- Sunbelt Working Mothers: Reconciling Family and Factory, 1993
- Situated Lives: Gender and Culture in Everyday Life, 1997
- Policy Implications of the Restructuring of Frozen Food Production in North America and Its Impact on Watsonville, California, 1999
- Las Nuevas fronteras del siglo XXI, 2000
- Women and Migration in the U.S.-Mexico Borderlands: A Reader, 2007
- Mexicans in California: Transformations and Challenges, 2009
- I'm Neither Here Nor There: Mexicans' Quotidian Struggles with Migration and Poverty, 2011
- The Movement for Reproductive Justice: Empowering Women of Color through Social Activism

== Translations ==
- Co-authored with Rebecca Gámez and Denise Segura, "Transborder Families and Trajectories of Migration and Work", translation of "Familias Transfronterizas y Trayectorias de Migración y Trabajo" by Norma Ojeda de la Peña, in Women and Migration in the U.S.-Mexico Borderlands: A Reader Denise A. Segura and Patricia Zavella, Eds. Durham: Duke University Press, 2007, pp. 327–340.
- Co-authored with Rebecca Gámez and Denise Segura, "The Migration of Women and Household Survival Strategies: A Case Study of Mixtec Women in Tijuana" translation of "Migración Femenina y Estrategias de Sobrevivencia de la Unidad Doméstica: Un Caso de Estudio de Mujeres Mixtecas en Tijuana" by Laura Velasco Ortiz, in Women and Migration in the U.S.-Mexico Borderlands: A Reader, Denise A. Segura and Patricia Zavella, Eds. Durham: Duke University Press, 2007, pp. 341–359.
