= Frank Bardacke =

American political activist, author

- Occupations: Political activist, labor activist, author

Franklin Joseph Bardacke is an American political activist, labor activist, and author. He protested the Vietnam War.

He was a member of the Oakland 7

Bardacke was featured in the film Berkeley in the Sixties and according to the film he: "Left Berkeley in 1970 and spent the next decade working in the fields and canneries near Salinas, California. He is still a leftist, active in labor and community politics." He had founded a Teamsters for a Democratic Union branch in Watsonville.

In 2011, he published Trampling Out the Vintage: Cesar Chavez and the two souls of the United Farm Workers (ISBN 9781844677184).
