= Roger Taylor (college president) =

Roger Taylor is the 18th president of Knox College, a nationally ranked liberal arts college located in Galesburg, Illinois. A native of Fulton County, Illinois, Taylor is a 1959 graduate of Cuba High School. He received his bachelor's degree in English from Knox College in 1963, and then served in the United States Navy for three and a half years, including a year in Vietnam, before entering law Northwestern University School of Law in 1968. He graduated with honors from Northwestern in 1971 and served as an editor of the law review. After law school, he practiced law at the firm of Kirkland & Ellis in Chicago, ultimately becoming partner with the international firm. Taylor joined the Knox College Board of Trustees in 1998 and served as its chair from 1999-2001. He became interim president in 2001, after the departure of Knox's 17th president, Richard Millman, and was officially installed as president of Knox College in October 2002. He served in that role until retiring in 2011.

His wife, Anne Zweifel Taylor, is a 1963 alumna of Knox.

== Work as president ==
At his installation, Taylor set three goals for his tenure as Knox's president: Nurturing Academic Excellence, Strengthening Institutional Self-Confidence, and Charting a Course Toward Financial Impregnability. Taylor took personally the challenge to help the college attract high-achieving students, strengthen alumni relationships, and enhance the academic reputation of Knox among other national liberal arts colleges.

Taylor guided Knox through restructuring its educational program, the growth of student enrollment from nearly 1,000 to 1,400, and an increase in alumni giving. During his tenure as president, Taylor oversaw several capital improvements to Knox's campus, including a multi-year Fitness & Athletics Initiative; the renovation of the student residence Hamblin Hall; the purchase and renovation of Borzello Hall, an academic and administrative building; and the renovation of a variety of campus facilities to enhance sustainability.

Challenges did arise during his tenure, including the need for increased student housing during a time of enrollment growth; the Recession of 2008, which affected Knox's endowment value and operating costs; and questions regarding the handling by the administration of sexual misconduct cases. Yet Taylor left office known for his enthusiasm for the college's students, faculty, and alumni and for his accessibility, regularly eating lunches with students in the student union and attending cultural and athletic events. The Knox College Student Senate honored his legacy at the college by naming a new student lounge the Roger Taylor Lounge in his name.

== Retirement ==
Taylor announced plans to retire as president of Knox College on April 5, 2010, and, after a national search for his successor, he officially stepped down on June 30, 2011. The Board of Trustees named Taylor Professor Emeritus in December 2011. When asked what he viewed as his greatest legacy at Knox, Taylor said "I fixed the Old Main bell."

Taylor and his wife, Anne, both received honorary Doctorate of Law degrees from Knox College during the celebration of their 50th Knox reunion in October 2013. In February 2016, Illinois Governor Bruce Rauner announced the appointment of Taylor to the Illinois State Museum Board.

== Successor ==
His successor as president was Teresa L. Amott, Ph.D., who was Provost and Dean of the Faculty at Hobart and William Smith Colleges (HWS), in Geneva, New York, having been in that post since 2005. Prior to that, she was Vice Provost of Gettysburg College in Gettysburg, Pennsylvania. She has a B.A. from Smith College and a Ph.D. from Boston College, and is an economist by training. Amott began her presidency in July 2011.

== Honors ==
In 2006, Roger Taylor was named one of the nation's ten "Most Attractive College Presidents," by "The Insider's Guide to the Colleges".

Roger Taylor was elected president of the Associated Colleges of Illinois, succeeding Richard F. Giese, the president of Monmouth College.
