= Aerion AS2 =

Cancelled supersonic business jet by Aerion Corporation

AS2
- AS2 configuration updated in 2020: low delta wing, area-ruled fuselage, cruciform tail, inlet spikes

General information
- Type: Supersonic business jet
- National origin: United States
- Manufacturer: Aerion
- Status: Cancelled

History
- Developed from: Aerion SBJ

The Aerion AS2 was a proposed supersonic business jet that was being developed by Aerion Corporation. In May 2014, it was announced that the Aerion AS2 would be part of a larger Aerion SBJ redesign, which aimed for release after a seven-year developmental period. Aerion partnered with Airbus in September the same year. In December 2017, Airbus was replaced by Lockheed Martin. Its General Electric Affinity engine was unveiled in October 2018. In February 2019, Boeing replaced Lockheed Martin. Development stopped when Aerion ceased operations in May 2021.

The Aerion AS2 12-passenger aircraft aimed for Mach 1.6 with a supersonic natural laminar flow wing for a minimum projected range of 4,750 nm (8,800 km). A $4 billion development cost was anticipated, for a market of 300 over 10 years and 500 overall for $120 million each.

== Development ==
Initial configuration with engines over the wing trailing edge

By May 2014, Aerion had invested over $100 million for technological development. The company announced at the May 2014 EBACE that it was redesigning its previous Aerion SBJ with a larger cabin, more range, and three yet unspecified engines for a $100 million-plus target price. The redesign aimed to fly a prototype in late 2018/early 2019 and certify the plane itself in 2021. Aerion intended to finance $3 billion for development, reducing risk for industry partners.

In September 2014, Aerion partnered with Airbus. Airbus Defence have supersonic expertise and available resources. The unit cost was predicted to be US$120 million at the May 2015 EBACE. In May 2015, NASA contracted Rockwell Collins to model supersonic boom on ground: predicting sonic booms and allowing pilots to see affected areas could ease restrictions against supersonic flights over inhabited areas. By September 2015, it was scheduled to enter service in 2023. In May 2017, Aerion was hoping to launch it in early 2018.

=== 2017 redesign ===
High wing 2017 configuration

In December 2017, Aerion and Lockheed Martin announced that they would explore its joint development without Airbus, aiming to fly in 2023 and be certificated in 2025. On December 15, after discussions with Lockheed's Skunk Works, they announced a MoU to explore over a year the joint development of the supersonic business jet: engineering, certification and production. Lockheed previously developed supersonic aircraft like the F-16, the F-35, F-22, and the Mach 3+ SR-71, and they concluded that the AS2 concept warranted time and resource investment after reviewing Aerion's aerodynamic technology. Throughout the two-and-a-half-year engineering collaboration with Airbus, Aerion advanced the AS2 aerodynamics and designed preliminary wing and airframe structures, a systems layout, and a fly-by-wire control system concept. Between May and December 2017, the GE collaboration resulted in moving the engines from the trailing edge to the wing leading edge, featuring a T-tail, and a higher wing aspect ratio.

By this time, Aerion said it was spending $1 billion for the AS2. Aerion and Lockheed wanted to freeze its engines, wings, and fuselage configuration in summer 2018, with the goal of selling 30 jets per year for $3.6 billion over 20 years.

With a 2018 launch, preliminary design would be reviewed by mid-2020 before detailed design for a critical design review in early 2022. First flight would be targeted in mid-2023 for a New York to London transatlantic flight in October, at the 20th anniversary of the retirement of the Concorde. Certification had aimed for late 2025 and entry-into-service in early 2026. Production will ramp up from 12 in 2026 to 23 in 2027 and should stabilize at 36 per year from 2028, although it could increase up to four per month.

In October 2018, Aerion announced the selection of the Honeywell Primus Epic avionics. The company was financed by Robert Bass and anticipated spending $4 billion in development costs. Aerion forecasted a market for 300 AS2s over 10 years, resulting in 500 overall for $120 million each. A faster (Mach 1.6), larger-cabin, longer-range successor could follow as a business jet and small airliner, but newer engines would need to be above Mach 1.8.

The partnership contract with Lockheed Martin expired on February 1, 2019. On February 5, Boeing announced its investment in Aerion, providing engineering, manufacturing, and flight test resources in order to keep the AS2 on path for a 2023 first flight. Billionaire backer Robert Bass left Aerion's board of directors (but remained a lead investor), and Tom Vice replaced him as chairman after being promoted to president, CEO, and board member in August. Boeing gained two seats on Aerion's five-person board, while the amount of its investment remained undisclosed.

=== 2020 redesign ===
In April 2020, Aerion unveiled an updated design for the 12 passenger jet, reaching Mach 1.4 in supercruise with nonafterburning engines, over 5,000 nmi (9,300 km). Building on the NASA X-59 experience, cruise could be boomless up to Mach 1.2, as thicker air at lower altitude can refract the boom away, but this was the highest drag region for the previous supersonic natural laminar flow wing. The new substantially cranked arrow delta wing is 79 ft (24 m) wide and has leading and trailing edges flaps for field performance and to meet aircraft noise regulations with reduced engine power. The fuselage has pronounced area ruling at its mid-section, and the cruciform horizontal stabilizer allows for a shorter airplane, down from 180 to 145 ft (55 to 44 m). The design is lighter with a 139,000 lb (63 t) gross weight, allowing a payload of 8,000 lb (3.6 t) and 70,000 lb (32 t) of fuel, used to trim weight and balance during the supersonic transition. The thick-lipped, subsonic-type engine inlets are replaced by axisymmetric external compression spiked inlets.

Partners and suppliers included: Safran for the landing gear and nacelles, GKN Aerospace and Fokker Technologies for the electrical wiring and the empennage structure, Spirit AeroSystems for the forward fuselage, Aernnova for the midfuselage structure, Potez for the doors, Eaton and Parker for systems and components, and Siemens Digital Industries Software for design and development. Aerion was then planning a 2024 first flight with a 2026 introduction. Aerion could propose an AS2 derivative to the United States military, as an Aerial Intelligence, Surveillance and Reconnaissance aircraft program. The High-Altitude Supercruise platform would serve as a high-altitude surveillance and eavesdropping aircraft.

Aerion then announced that it would construct Aerion Park, a research, design, and manufacturing campus, in Melbourne, Florida, benefiting from the aerospace expertise of Florida's Space Coast. The AS2 would be manufactured in the new facility starting in 2023, with the goal of building five AS2 test aircraft from 2023 to 2025. The facility would include a $300 million factory, a 110.6 acres (44.8 ha) campus, and production plants capable of building 48 AS2 aircraft per year. Aerion Park would also focus on green technologies, such as solar and 100% water recycling, to power its operations and leave the lowest environmental footprint possible.

In June 2020, Boeing and Spirit AeroSystems disbanded their AS2 engineering teams due to the impact of the COVID-19 pandemic on aviation, and Aerion had to push its first flight date back from 2024 to 2025.

In September 2020, Aerion had begun windtunnel testing at Onera. Wind tunnel tests reached Mach 3, providing high-speed performance evaluations, loads, stability measurements, and control of transonic and supersonic velocities, to complete the preliminary design review. A.I. technology and digital modelling shorten the AS2 development and avoid the need for a demonstrator aircraft. While Aerion had more than $500 million invested, total development could cost $5 billion, 25% more than the 2018 prediction.

Development stopped when Aerion ceased operations in May 2021.

=== Engine ===
In May 2017, Aerion selected GE Aviation to study the final engine configuration. Though initially designed with a modified Pratt & Whitney JT8D, General Electric Affinity was selected in May 2017 to power the AS2. The first official design was completed in 2018, and a more detailed design followed in 2020 for the first prototype production.

The engine's high-pressure core is derived from the CFM56, and it matches a new twin fan, low-pressure section for a reduced bypass ratio that is better suited to supersonic flight. The AS2 engine design supports an altitude ceiling of 60,000 feet. General Electric's intentions on the project were confirmed at the 2018 National Business Aviation Association's annual conference.

== Design ==
The Aerion AS2 should supercruise at up to Mach 1.4 over a range of 5,000 nm (9,260 km). Its projected maximum takeoff weight is 150,000 lb (68 t). The delta wing reduces aerodynamic drag by 20% compared to a conventional delta wing. The cabin seats up to 8-10 passengers. The plane has a revamped empennage, and elongated nacelles. The plane is 145 ft (44 m) long, 79 ft (24 m) wide and 29 ft (8.8 m) high.

Noise regulations caused Aerion to change the design from two engines to three. These noise regulations were to limit its MTOW at 54,400 kg (120,000 lb), which would have limited range. It plans to meet Stage 5 noise requirements and run 100% on biofuel.

GE Aviation provides the Affinity turbofan, Honeywell the Primus Epic avionics and connectivity systems. PPG Industries provides the flight deck windshields and cabin window transparencies, Liebherr Aerospace the integrated air management system, BAE Systems the flight controls, and Collins Aerospace the actuation systems. Spirit AeroSystems, Safran, GKN, Aernnova, and Potez Aeronautique supply aerostructures, wiring, nacelle, landing gear, and aircraft doors.

NASA research modelling Sonic boom on ground, to predict sonic booms and depict them for pilots, potentially easing restrictions against supersonic flights.

The AS2 will not incorporate the technology from the Low Boom Flight Demonstrator built by Lockheed's Skunk Works, but a following AS3 may. Aerion could develop a family of supersonic and hypersonic aircraft.

== Orders ==
In November 2015, Flexjet confirmed that they had placed a firm order valued at $2.4 billion for twenty Aerion AS2s, with delivery to begin in 2023. Flexjet CEO Kenn Ricci said the company would use the supersonic jet for overseas flights and also in China, which does not have restrictions on sonic booms. Ricci noted that, with the aircraft traveling at Mach 1.2, its boom would not reach the ground, possibly allowing regulators to permit supersonic flight over land. Flexjet, owned by Directional Aviation Capital, offers customers fractional ownership of aircraft, rather than outright purchase.

In March 2021, another fractional ownership company, NetJets, announced that it had acquired purchase rights for 20 AS2s, bringing Aerion's order backlog value to over $10 billion. The memorandum of understanding between NetJets and Aerion calls for the two companies to envisage Netjets operating an "Aerion Connect" network.

== Specifications (AS2) ==
Data from Aerion

General characteristics

- Crew: 2
- Capacity: 8–11 passengers
- Length: 144.9 ft (44.2 m)
- Wingspan: 79 ft (24 m)
- Height: 29 ft (8.8 m)
- Wing area: 1,511 sq ft (140.4 m^{2})
- Max takeoff weight: 150,000 lb (68,039 kg)
- Fuel capacity: 59,084 lbs / 26,800 kg
- Interior: 30 feet long, 6'4" high, 7'11" wide (9.1 × 1.95 × 2.16 m)
- Powerplant: 3 × General Electric Affinity turbofan, 18,000 lbf (80 kN) thrust each

Performance

- Cruise speed: 803 kn (924 mph, 1,487 km/h) Mach 1.4, subsonic: Mach 0.95, boomless: Mach 1.1–1.2
- Range: 4,200 nmi (4,800 mi, 7,800 km) at Mach 1.4, 5,400 nm / 10,000 km at Mach 0.95
- Balanced field length at ISA, SL: 7,500ft / 2,286m

== See also ==
- Supersonic business jet
- Supersonic transport

Related development

- Aerion SBJ

Aircraft of comparable role, configuration, and era

- Boom Overture
- HyperMach SonicStar
- SAI Quiet Supersonic Transport
- Spike S-512
- Sukhoi-Gulfstream S-21
- Tupolev Tu-444

Related lists

- List of civil aircraft
