= Aerion =

Defunct American aircraft manufacturer

Aerion Corporation
- Type: Private
- Industry: Aerospace
- Founded: 2003
- Defunct: May 21, 2021
- Fate: Ran out of money for funding
- Headquarters: Reno, Nevada, United States
- Key people: Tom Vice, chairman, president, and CEO; Robert Bass, founder
- Products: Supersonic business jet
- Website: aerionsupersonic.com

Aerion Corporation was an American aircraft manufacturer based in Reno, Nevada. It was founded by Robert Bass of Fort Worth.

From 2004 until 2021, the company was developing a 10-passenger supersonic jet to cut transatlantic flights by three hours, using "boomless cruise" technology to negate the sonic boom. It was expected to be the first supersonic aircraft without an afterburner to lower emissions, and the first to run on biofuels.

Aerion abruptly announced on May 21, 2021, that the company would be shutting down due to inability to raise needed capital to proceed.

== History ==
Aerion Corporation was founded in 2003 by Texas billionaire Robert Bass as a startup working to commercialize supersonic aviation technology. The company began development on supersonic business jets in 2004.

Increased demand from a variety of aircraft manufacturers for Aerion’s natural laminar flow (NLF) expertise drove the company to launch Aerion Technologies Corporation, a wholly owned subsidiary, in May 2011. Aerion stated that the same proprietary technologies and design tools that enable a practical supersonic business jet also have subsonic and transonic applications. During the previous 10 years, Aerion had developed extensive NLF test data and methods for optimizing its application to aircraft design, as well as assuring practical manufacturing and operational use. Aerion Technologies’ NLF technology and design tools may also help airframe builders improve speed and efficiency limits for next-generation civil and military aircraft.

In May 2015, Ernest Edwards, formerly president of Embraer Executive Jets, was appointed Aerion’s chief commercial officer, while previous Gulfstream G650 chief engineer Mike Hinderberger was promoted to senior vice president for aircraft development.

In March 2018, Tom Vice, former president of Northrop Grumman's Aerospace Systems sector, was appointed President and COO. A year later, Vice also replaced Robert Bass as Chairman of the Board upon the announcement of a partnership between Boeing and Aerion.

In April 2020, the company announced the construction of a $375 million production facility at the Melbourne Orlando International Airport and the relocation of its headquarters to the Aerion Park campus, with the hopes of the first commercial delivery of planes by 2027. Aerion began development on carbon neutral capabilities for its AS2 jet through direct air capture in a 2020 deal with Carbon Engineering. In July 2020, Aerion partnered with Jetex to establish travel arrangements for AS2 passengers.

On May 21, 2021, at the time of its collapse, the company had 93 orders for the AS2 aircraft at a price of US$120 million, a backlog of $11.2 billion. Aerion had only a fraction of the US$4 billion it estimated would be needed to complete certification and commence production. The company said the customer deposits would be returned.

In June 2021, Boeing CEO Dave Calhoun explained why it stopped supporting Aerion, stating that he asked, "is it going to be big enough and meaningful enough to Boeing? And maybe not just in terms of share of market and service market, but also in terms of return on capital? And does it bring any technology to our existing core business? And if it doesn't, then it's got to really stand on its own … And our decision on supersonic was that it didn't."

== Projects ==
=== Aerion SBJ ===
The Aerion SBJ was a supersonic business jet project designed by Aerion.

Unveiled in 2004, the designer sought a joint venture with a business aircraft manufacturer anticipating a $1.2–1.4 billion development in 7–8 years. Aerion received 50 letters-of-intent before enlarging the design as the Aerion AS2 in 2014.

Powered by two Pratt & Whitney JT8D-219 engines, the $80 million aircraft would transport 8-12 passengers up to Mach 1.6 and up to 4,000 nmi (7,400 km).

=== Aerion AS2 ===
The Aerion AS2 was announced in May 2014, as a larger Aerion SBJ redesign, targeting introduction after a seven year development period. Aerion initially partnered with Airbus on the project in September 2014. In December 2017, Airbus was replaced as a partner by Lockheed Martin. Its General Electric Affinity engine for the AS2 was unveiled in October 2018. In February 2019, Boeing replaced Lockheed Martin as a partner.

The 12 passenger aircraft aimed for Mach 1.4 with a supersonic natural laminar flow wing for a minimum projected range of 4,750 nm (8,800 km). It was designed to have flown at just below the sound barrier while flying over land in order to comply with supersonic flight restrictions.

A $4 billion development cost was anticipated, for a market for 300 aircraft over 10 years and 500 aircraft overall, at $120 million each. A preliminary design review was delayed until 2021 due to the COVID-19 pandemic. Aerion had projected a $40 billion market for the AS2 with a $3.18 billion order backlog from companies such as Flexjet and discussions for orders valued at another $6.2 billion.

=== Aerion AS3 ===
Aerion announced, in March 2021, a 50 seat hypersonic Mach 4 airliner project aimed to achieve a range of 7,000 km (3,800 nmi). The company targeted commercial availability by 2029.

== See also ==
- Supersonic business jet
- Boom Supersonic
- Exosonic
- Spike S-512
- Hermeus
