= Tupolev Tu-244 =

1979–1993 proposed supersonic passenger airliner

Tu-244
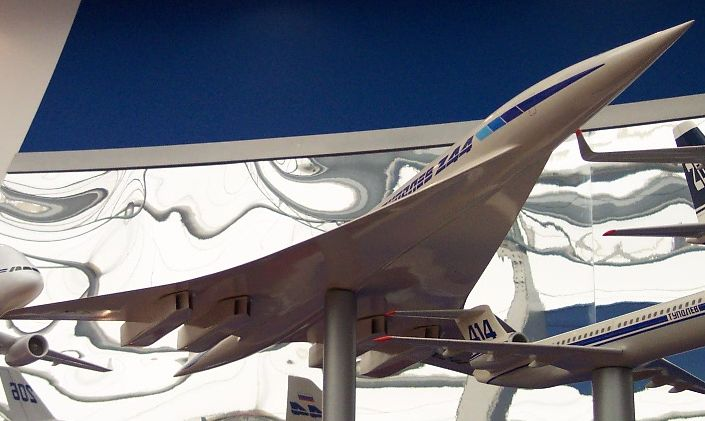
- Mockup of the Tupolev Tu-244

General information
- Type: Supersonic transport
- Manufacturer: Tupolev
- Designer: Tupolev
- Status: Cancelled

History
- Developed from: Tupolev Tu-144

The Tupolev Tu-244 was a proposed supersonic transport (SST) aircraft, developed from the Tu-144. It implemented novel features such as cryogenic fuel to enable flight distances of up to 10,000 km (6,200 mi) and would have carried up to 300 passengers. The project was cancelled in 1993.

== History ==
The draft work began in 1979, and when the project ended in 1993 substantial progress had already been made during the interpretation. Specifically, the air resistance in the range of Mach 2 was only 50% higher than a conventional passenger airliner traveling at a speed of Mach 0.9.

The nearly-circular fuselage (3.9 m [12.8 ft] width, 4.1 m [13.5 ft] height) and the wing unit would have consisted to a large extent of titanium-composite materials. The engines were to be higher performance hydrogen-fuelled versions of the Kuznetsov NK-321 turbofan, used also with the Tu-160. Adjustable air intake ramps from the Tu-160 might have been included. Projected passenger capacity was 311.

Fly-by-wire was intended for flight control. Rather than using a tilting nose, video cameras were to provide the crew with the necessary view for landings.

== Specifications ==
Data from tu144sst.com

General characteristics

- Crew: three
- Capacity: 250/320 passengers
- Length: 88.7 m (291 ft 0 in)
- Wingspan: 54.77 m (179 ft 8 in)
- Height: 16.9 m (55 ft 5 in)
- Wing area: 1,200 m^{2} (13,000 sq ft)
- Empty weight: 172,000 kg (379,195 lb)
- Max takeoff weight: 350,000 kg (771,618 lb)
- Fuel capacity: 178,000 kg (392,000 lb) maximum
- Powerplant: 4 × Kuznetsov NK-321 afterburning turbofan engines, 323.73 kN (72,780 lbf) with afterburner

Performance

- Cruise speed: 2,175 km/h (1,351 mph, 1,174 kn) / Mach 2.05
- Range: 9,200 km (5,700 mi, 5,000 nmi)
- Service ceiling: 19,000 m (62,000 ft)

== See also ==
- Hypersonic transport
- Quiet Supersonic Transport
- Supersonic transport

Related development

- Tupolev Tu-144
- Tupolev Tu-444

Aircraft of comparable role, configuration, and era

- Aerion SBJ
- Sukhoi-Gulfstream S-21
