= General Electric Affinity =

Supersonic aircraft engine design

Affinity
- Type: Turbofan
- National origin: United States
- Manufacturer: GE Aviation
- Major applications: Aerion AS2
- Number built: Cancelled
- Developed from: CFM International CFM56; General Electric F110

The General Electric Affinity was a turbofan developed by GE Aviation for supersonic transports. Conceived in May 2017 to power the Aerion AS2 supersonic business jet, initial design was completed in 2018 and detailed design in 2020 for the first prototype production. GE Aviation discontinued development of the engine in May 2021. Its high-pressure core is derived from the CFM56, matched to a new twin fan low-pressure section for a reduced bypass ratio better suited to supersonic flight.

== Development ==
At the May 2017 EBACE, Aerion announced the selection of GE Aviation to power the Aerion AS2 supersonic business jet. GE then launched the Affinity program. The final engine configuration was a core with billions of operational hours – suggesting the CFM56 – and a new low-pressure section optimized for supersonic speed. The Affinity high-pressure core was adapted from the CFM56 and the GE F101/F110 military engines.

In February 2018, Aerion released the GE engine configuration. Thrust was reduced at takeoff to meet Chapter 5 noise regulations, requiring a longer balanced field takeoff as an acceptable compromise. Chapter 5 applies from 2018 to over 120,000 lb (54,400 kg) aircraft and all aircraft from 2021. The initial design of its Affinity medium-bypass-ratio turbofan was completed by October 2018. The detailed design review was expected to be completed by 2020 for the prototype production.

Following the collapse of Aerion on 21 May 2021, GE Aviation discontinued development of the Affinity engine, leaving no supersonic turbojet supplier for the Boom Overture, after Rolls-Royce also announced the end of their involvement in the project.

== Design ==
GE Aviation needed to develop a configuration accommodating reasonable requirements for supersonic speed, subsonic speed and noise levels. Managing the high intake temperatures at high altitudes is a key challenge for the initial design. An engine for supersonic flight needs a lower bypass ratio than modern turbofans, and a higher flow speed for better efficiency. This is limited by noise regulations at takeoff, and a lower compression core like the CFM56 is better suited to higher temperatures encountered supersonically. The engine is a compromise between a large core for power and a small fan for wave drag, and Mach 1.4 is a compromise between higher speed and enough range.

The high-pressure core is derived from the nine-stage compressor and single-stage turbine of the CFM56, matched to a new low-pressure section optimised for supersonic speed with a 133 cm (52in) diameter fan instead of the 155-173 cm (61-68.3in) fan of the 6:1 bypass ratio CFM56. The twin-shaft, twin-fan engine with FADEC has a service ceiling of 18,300 m (60,000 ft). It lacks an afterburner, and has a combustor with advanced coatings and uses additive manufacturing technologies.

The 18,000 lbf (80 kN) GE Affinity has a nine-stage HP compressor, a single-stage HP turbine and a two-stage low-pressure turbine. Preceded by fixed inlet guide vanes with movable flaps, the twin blisk fans have wide-chord titanium blades. The exhaust mixer is similar to the GE Passport ceramic matrix composite design. The Mach 1.4-to-1.6 speed requires no variable-geometry inlet and the variable-area nozzle has a cone moving longitudinally, replacing a convergent-divergent nozzle. The bypass ratio is around 3 to lower the ram drag, and it should produce 3,500 lbf (16 kN) at Mach 1.4 and FL500, with a cruise fuel consumption increased by 50% over the Mach 0.78 CFM56-5.

== Specifications ==
==== General characteristics ====
- Type: Twin-shaft, medium bypass, non-afterburning turbofan
- Length:
- Diameter: 1.33m (52in) fan
- Dry weight:

==== Components ====
- Compressor: 2 Fans, 9 HP stages
- Turbine: 1 HP, 2 LP stages

==== Performance ====
- Maximum thrust: 16,000–20,000 lbf (71–89 kN) (3,500 lbf (16 kN) in cruise)
- Bypass ratio: ~3:1

== See also ==
Related development

- CFM International CFM56
- General Electric F101

Comparable engines

- Boom Symphony
- General Electric CF34
- Rolls-Royce BR700
- Pratt & Whitney JT8D

Related lists

- List of aircraft engines
