= Spike S-512 =

Supersonic business jet by Spike Aerospace

- Artist's rendering of Spike S-512 in flight

General information
- Type: Supersonic business jet
- Manufacturer: Spike Aerospace
- Status: Under development

The Spike S-512 is a planned supersonic business jet, designed by Spike Aerospace, an American aerospace manufacturer firm based in Boston, Massachusetts.

== Design ==
The S-512 would have enabled long flights for business and private travelers, such as from New York City to London, to take only three to four hours instead of six to seven. The aircraft did not have windows for passengers. Instead, it would have been equipped with cameras sending external views to thin, curved displays lining the interior walls of the fuselage.

== Development ==
In early 2014, the company planned to promote the project with an exhibit at the 2014 EAA AirVenture Oshkosh airshow. Spike then expected to launch the plane by December 2018. In January 2017, a subsonic scale prototype was planned to fly in summer 2017 to demonstrate low-speed aerodynamic flight characteristics, before a series of larger prototypes and a supersonic demonstrator by the end of 2018, Spike intended to certify the S-512 by 2023. By Spring 2018, Spike studied a 40- to 50-seat variant for the 13 million passengers interested in supersonic transport projected by 2025. In September 2018, Spike intended to fly the S-512 by early 2021 and start deliveries in 2023. In June 2021, Spike was reported to still be developing an 18-seat version.

== Specifications ==
Data from Spike

General characteristics

- Capacity: 18 passengers
- Length: 122 ft (37 m)
- Wingspan: 58 ft (18 m)
- Empty weight: 47,250 lb (21,432 kg)
- Max takeoff weight: 115,000 lb (52,163 kg)
- Fuel capacity: 56,000 lb
- Powerplant: 2 × engines , 20,000 lbf (89 kN) thrust each

Performance

- Maximum speed: 1,033 kn (1,189 mph, 1,913 km/h) Mach 1.8
- Cruise speed: 918 kn (1,056 mph, 1,700 km/h) Mach 1.6
- Range: 6,200 nmi (7,100 mi, 11,500 km)
- Service ceiling: 50,000 ft (15,000 m)

== See also ==
- Supersonic business jet
- Supersonic transport

Aircraft of comparable role, configuration, and era

- Aerion AS2
- Boom Technology
- HyperMach SonicStar
- SAI Quiet Supersonic Transport
- Sukhoi-Gulfstream S-21
- Tupolev Tu-444

Related lists

- List of civil aircraft
