= Zero Emission Hyper Sonic Transport =

Hypersonic passenger plane concept

ZEHST (Zero Emission High Speed Transportation)
- ZEHST Plane Concept

General information
- Type: Hypersonic airliner
- Manufacturer: EADS
- Designer: EADS
- Status: In development

The Zero Emission Hyper Sonic Transport or ZEHST is a planned hypersonic passenger jet airliner project by the multinational aerospace conglomerate EADS and the Japanese national space agency JAXA.

On 18 June 2011, the ZEHST concept was unveiled by EADS at the Le Bourget Air Show. The envisioned vehicle uses a combination of three different types of engines, including relatively conventional turbofans, rocket motors, and scramjets to attain a maximum speed of Mach 4.5 (four and a half times the speed of sound). The ZEHST has been projected to carry between 50 and 100 passengers while flying at very high altitudes for greater efficiency.

Conceptually, the ZEHST has been promoted as a descendant of, or a successor to, Concorde, a supersonic airliner that was withdrawn from passenger routes in 2003. According to projections released, the ZEHST would be capable of flying between Paris and Tokyo in 2.5 hours, or between New York and London in one hour. In 2011 EADS predicted that the ZEHST could be flying by 2050, according to an article in SuperBlondie revising the prediction in 2024 to 40 years from then.

== Development ==
Even before the introduction of the Concorde supersonic airliner during the 1970s, the aviation industry has wanted to produce high-speed transport aircraft. Since the 1990s, several collaborative research efforts in the field have been financed in Europe. By the 2010s, both the American aerospace company Boeing and the multinational aerospace conglomerate EADS were reportedly working on separate plans to develop hypersonic aircraft. Such efforts have largely been constrained to theoretical work, but some progress has been observed over the decades, and innovations have continued to be patented in the field, such as a patent for a mixed-propulsion arrangement awarded to EADS in 2010. Amongst other aspects, efforts have been made to reduce noise generated by the sonic booms commonly produced by aircraft flying at supersonic speeds.

On 18 June 2011, EADS revealed the Zero Emission Hyper Sonic Transport (ZEHST) concept at the Le Bourget Air Show. As originally announced, the aircraft would combine three distinct propulsion systems: two turbofan engines for taxiing, take-off, and up to Mach 0.8; then rocket boosters up to Mach 2.5, afterwards switching to a pair of underwing scramjets to accelerate up to its maximum speed of Mach 4.5 (four and a half times the speed of sound). The fuel of these engines is envisaged to be a biofuel primarily made out of seaweed, along with a combination of oxygen and hydrogen. Largely due to this fuel composition, the aircraft has been referred to as a "green" aircraft that generates "almost zero emissions".

The ZEHST has an unusually high cruising altitude of 32 km, flying within the outer atmosphere, compared to the 11km of conventional airliners; this altitude was chosen because the air is thinner and causes less drag. The use of conventional turbofan engines during takeoff would make the ZEHST quieter than conventional airliners. The ZEHST's configuration has not been finalised. In addition to EADS itself, much of the propulsion-based development work on the ZEHST project had been made in cooperation with the European missile specialist MBDA and the French national aerospace research centre ONERA. International engagement also secured partners; the cooperative HIKARI R&D project is underway between Japanese and European agencies. The ZEHST is not the only such effort that the company has engaged in; by 2015, Airbus Group (EADS's new name) was reportedly working on two hypersonic projects, one in conjunction with Japanese partners and the other with Russian and Australian involvement. That same year, Airbus chief executive Tom Enders stated his support for development of a hypersonic long range passenger transport.

== See also ==
- Supercruise
- Concorde
- Tupolev Tu-144
- SpaceLiner
- Boeing 2707
- Orient Express X-30 follow-on
- Boeing Sonic Cruiser
- HyperMach SonicStar
- Reaction Engines A2
- Skylon
- Airbus Defence and Space Spaceplane
