= SpaceLiner =

German concept space hypersonic airliner

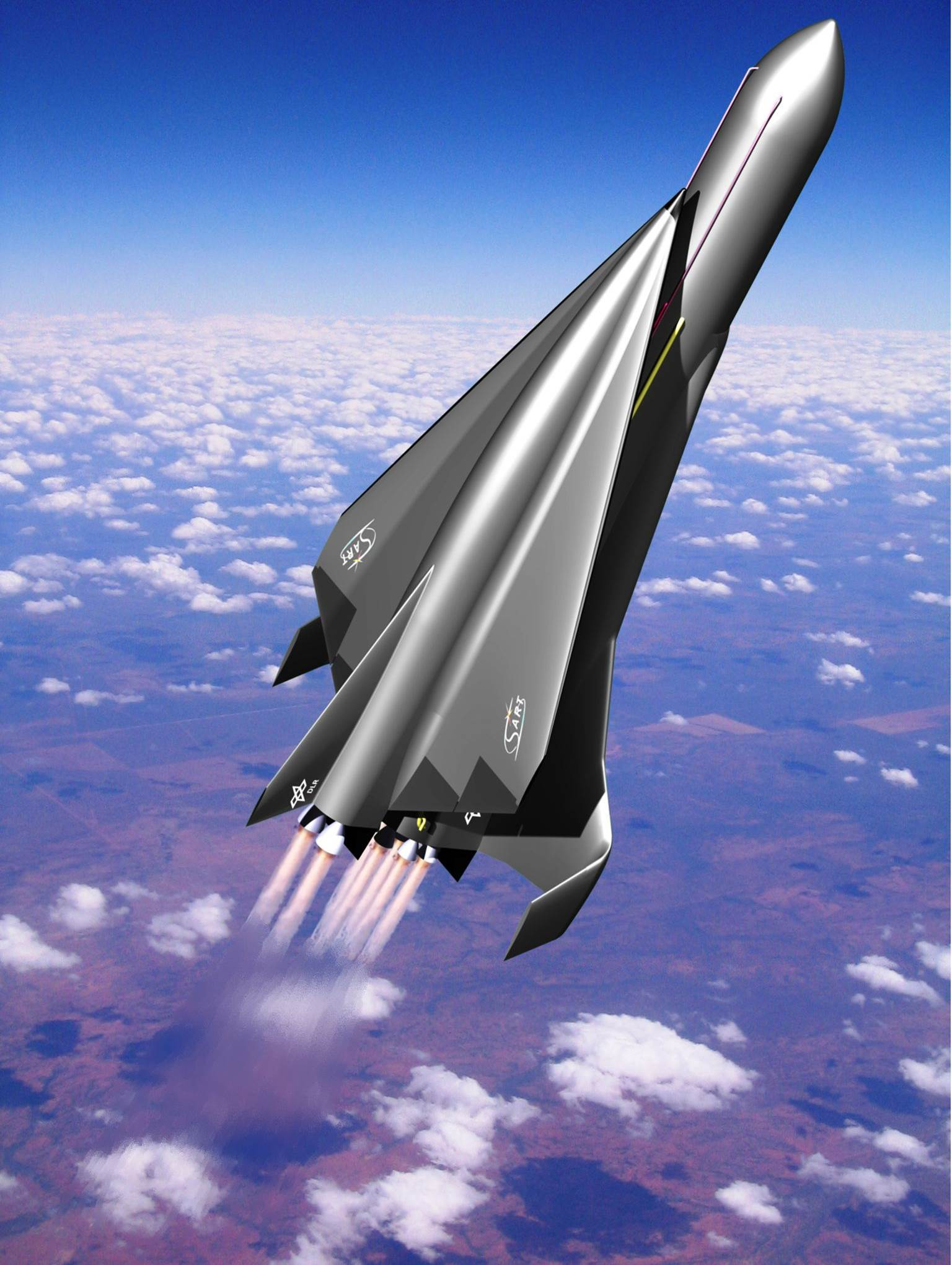
- Artist's impression of the SpaceLiner 7 during ascent
- Country: Germany
- Status: under study
- Crew members: 2 crew 50 passengers

SpaceLiner is a concept for a suborbital, hypersonic, winged passenger supersonic transport, conceived at the German Aerospace Center (Deutsches Zentrum für Luft- und Raumfahrt, or DLR) in 2005. In its second role the SpaceLiner is intended as a reusable launch vehicle (RLV) capable of delivering heavy payloads into orbit.

The SpaceLiner is a very long-term project, and does not currently have funding lined up to initiate system development as of 2017. Projections in 2015 were that if adequate funding was eventually secured, the SpaceLiner concept might become an operational spaceplane in the 2040s.

== Concept ==
The SpaceLiner concept consists of a two-stage, vertical takeoff, horizontal landing configuration with a large uncrewed booster and a crewed stage designed for 50 passengers and 2 crew members. The fully reusable system is accelerated by a total of eleven liquid rocket engines (9 for the booster stage, 2 for the passenger stage), which are to be operated using cryogenic liquid oxygen (LOX) and hydrogen (LH2). After engine cut-off, the passenger stage will enter a high-speed gliding flight phase and shall be capable of travelling long intercontinental distances within a very short time. Altitudes of 80 kilometers and speed beyond Mach 20 are projected, depending on the mission and the associated trajectory flown. SpaceLiner flight times from Australia to Europe, the chosen reference mission, should take 90 minutes. Shorter distances, such as Europe to California for example, would then be achievable in no more than 60 minutes. Acceleration loads for the passengers, and only during the propelled section of the flight, are designed to remain below 2.5 g, and well below those experienced by the Space Shuttle astronauts.

The concept design also foresees the passenger cabin to function as an autonomous rescue capsule which can be separated from the vehicle in case of an emergency, thus allowing the passengers to return safely to Earth.

A key aspect of the SpaceLiner concept is its full reusability and vehicle mass-production, which would closely resemble production rates of the aviation industry. Serial production is expected to deliver a significant increase in cost effectiveness compared to conventional space transportation systems of the early 2000s. A major challenge lies in improving the safety standards and especially the robustness and reliability of space components such as rocket engines, so that they will become suitable for the daily operation of a passenger transporter like the SpaceLiner, while also meeting the required reusability criteria.

As of 2013, the concept study was funded by DLR's internal resources, as well as in the context of EU-FP7 funded projects such as FAST20XX and CHATT. In addition to DLR, various partners from the European aerospace sector are involved.

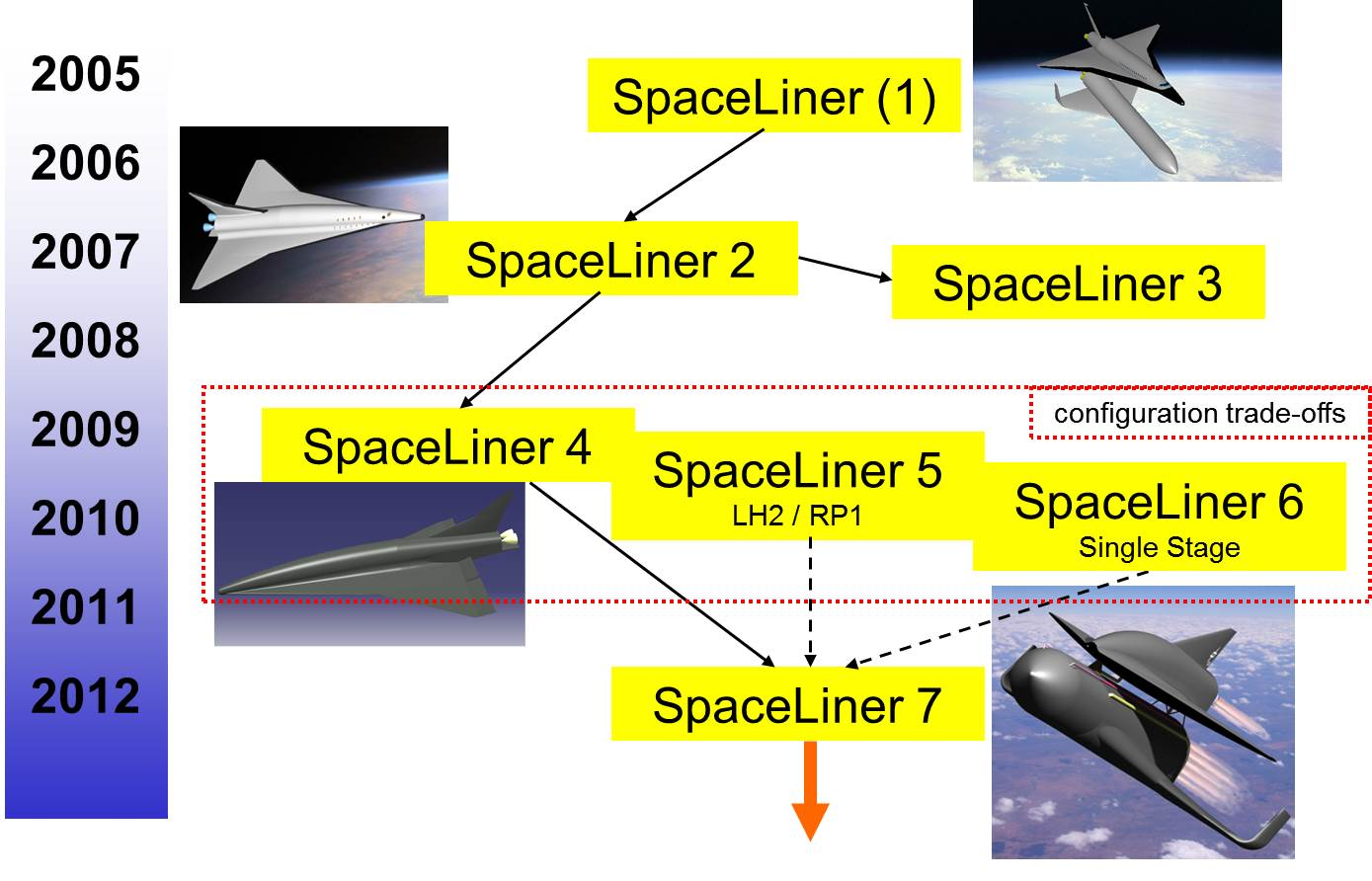
History of SpaceLiner development up to version 7

== Concept development ==
At the end of 2012 investigations and ongoing studies conducted within context of the FAST20XX framework led to the refinement and definition of the SpaceLiner 7 version. Based on the results of previous studies, development has been progressing continuously with increasingly detailed and in-depth considerations, modelling and simulations of the various subsystems, and their design and integration being performed. Selected variants to the baseline configuration given different requirements and specifications were studied with associated results influencing and redirecting the entire configuration process.

SpaceLiner 1 was the first version, conceived in 2005.

SpaceLiner 2 refers to the first version, which featured the integration of an innovative active cooling system for the areas of particularly high thermal stresses during atmospheric re-entry, which are the nose and wing leading edge sections.

SpaceLiner 3

SpaceLiner 4 concept is a 2015 evolution of version 2 with improved aerodynamic and flight dynamic characteristics. Based on this configuration, various technologies necessary for the SpaceLiner were experimentally and numerically examined, research that was funded by the EU research project FAST20XX.

SpaceLiner 5

SpaceLiner 6

As of 2015, the latest configuration under study at the DLR is the SpaceLiner 7. Based on results obtained from application of numerical optimisation methods which achieved an improvement of the aerodynamic, thermal and structural-mechanical properties in hypersonic flight, the initial double delta wing of previous versions has been modified and replaced by a single delta wing. So far, subsystems such as the passenger cabin, the cryogenic tanks, the propellant feed system and the vehicle thermal protection have been preliminarily defined and integrated. Studies have also been carried out on the economic and logistical aspects of the concept, with preliminary calculations of expected program development and production costs given necessary assumptions.

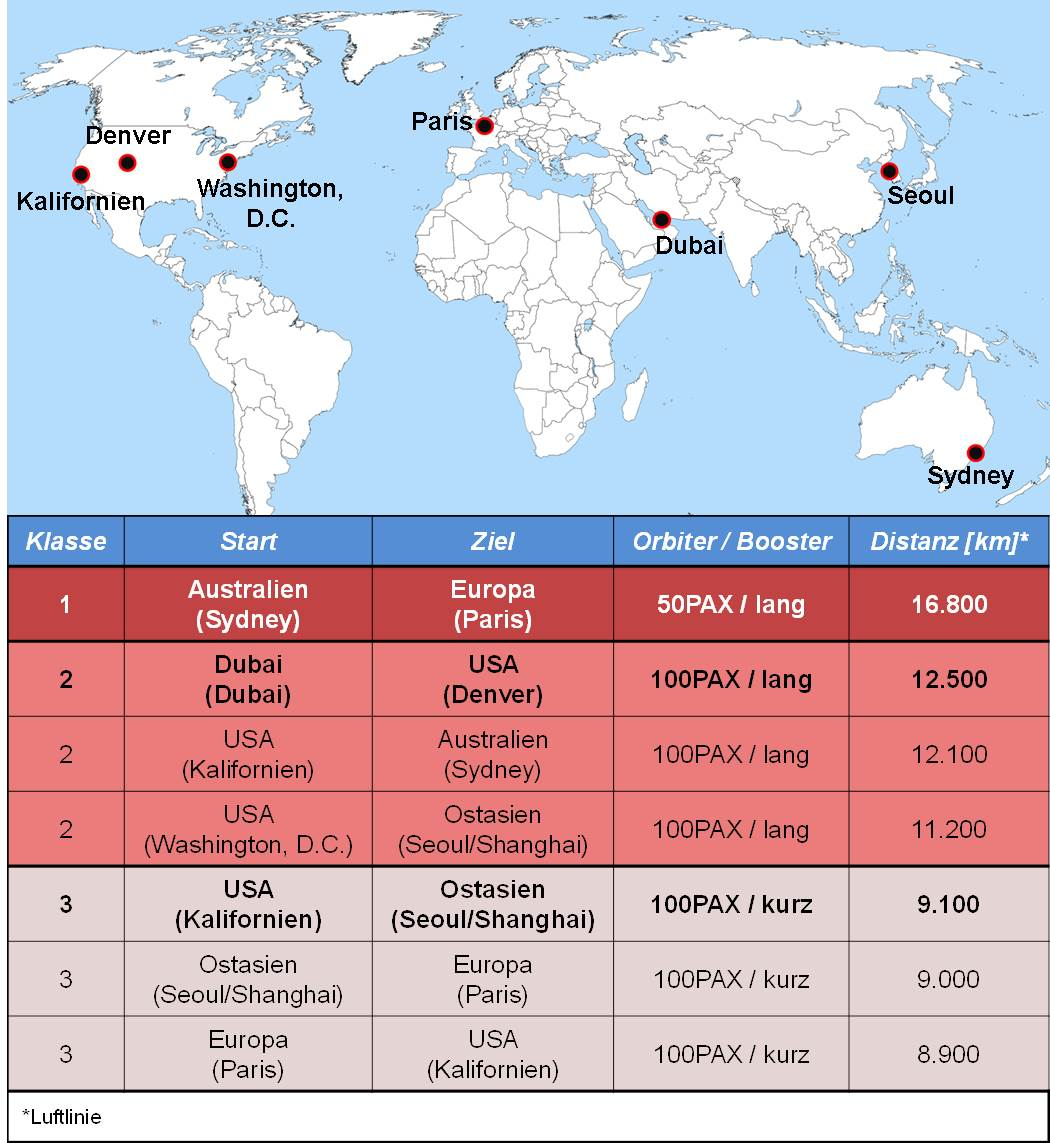
Classification of possible routes for the SpaceLiner

Possible routes, which have then formed the basis of trajectory analyses for SpaceLiner, have been identified. These are classified and grouped in terms of their distances, with Class 1 representing the longest route, and Class 3 describing the shortest yet still economically interesting and relevant distance. In line with this, a modified version of the SpaceLiner 7 capable of flying medium long-haul distances while carrying 100 passengers has been examined. Given the name SL7-100, this concept variant is suitable for Class 2 and Class 3 distance flights. To accommodate for the different SpaceLiner configurations, a long and short version of the booster stage have therefore been considered to accordingly fulfill the mission requirements depending on the required range, either in combination with the 50 or 100-passenger stage version. In addition, research into possible spaceport variants has been performed, determining mainland, offshore platform and artificial island possibilities, as well as the required infrastructure for a potential SpaceLiner spaceport.

== Technical data ==
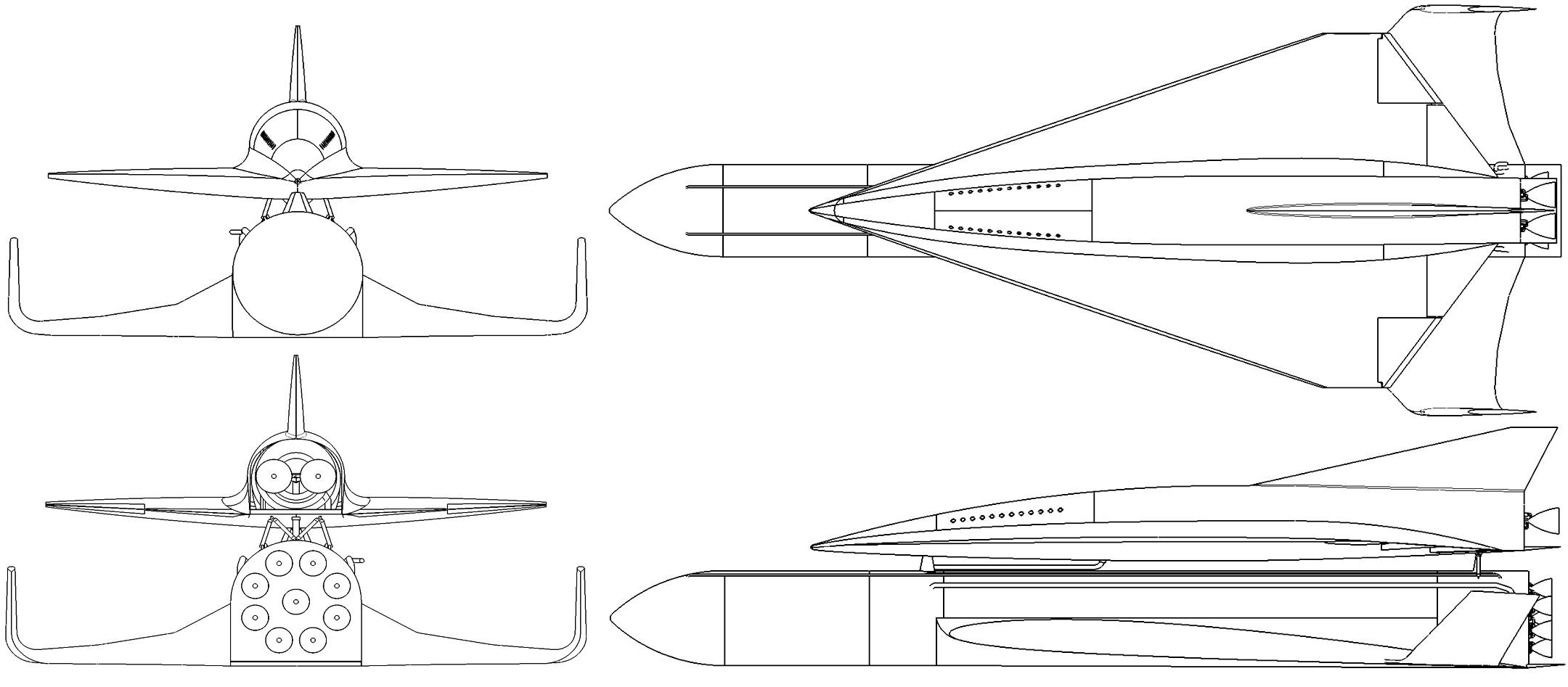
SpaceLiner7 drawings

The specifications of the SpaceLiner 7 passenger version are:

Parameters	Passenger stage (50 passenger version)	Booster (long version)	Total (Australia–Europe mission)
Overall length:	65.6 m	82.3 m	
Wing span:	33.0 m	36.0 m	
Overall height:	12.1 m	8.7 m	21.5 m
Cabin length:	15.3 m	-	
Max. fuselage diameter:	6.4 m	8.6 m	
Empty mass:	130 t	198 t	328 t
Total mass:	366 t	1467 t	1832 t
Propellant mass:	220 t	1272 t	1502 t
Main engines cut-off mass:	151 t	213 t	
Max. altitude:	approx. 80 km	approx. 75 km	
Max. speed:	7 km/s (25,200 km/h)	3.7 km/s (13,300 km/h)	
Max. Mach number:	24	14	
Max. range:	up to about. 18,000 km		
Number of engines:	2	9	11

== Propulsion ==
The SpaceLiner concept intends to use a single type of reusable liquid rocket engine, which operates in the full-flow staged combustion cycle mode. Having a common engine design for both SpaceLiner stages is in line with system commonality and is projected to support cost optimisation in both the development and production phases. The nozzle expansion ratio is adapted to the different missions of the booster and passenger stages. Furthermore, liquid hydrogen and liquid oxygen will be used as the propellants, a combination which is both very powerful while still remaining eco-friendly.

Characteristics	Passenger Stage	Booster
Mixture ratio:	6.0	
Combustion chamber pressure:	16.0 MPa	
Mass flow rate (per engine):	515 kg/s	
Expansion ratio:	59.0	33.0
Specific impulse (vacuum):	449 s	437 s
Specific impulse (sea level):	363 s	389 s
Thrust per engine (vacuum):	2268 kN	2206 kN
Thrust per engine (sea level):	1830 kN	1961 kN

== See also ==
- Airbus Defence and Space Spaceplane
- Boeing Sonic Cruiser
- HyperMach SonicStar
- SpaceX Starship
- Zero Emission Hyper Sonic Transport
- Earth-to-Earth spaceflight
