= Hyperstar =

Hyperstar may refer to:

- Hyperstar, a subsidiary brand of Carrefour
  - Iran Hyper Star, the subsidiary operating in Iran
- Hypergiant, a kind of star with extremely high luminosity
- Hypervelocity star, a star with substantially higher velocity than the rest of the stellar population of a galaxy

== See also ==
- Jesus Christ Hyperstar, 2015 album by Lychee Light Club
- HyperMach SonicStar, proposed high-supersonic aircraft business jet
