= Aerion SBJ =

Supersonic business jet project

SBJ

General information
- Type: Supersonic business jet
- National origin: United States
- Designer: Aerion Corporation
- Status: Cancelled

History
- Developed into: Aerion AS2

The Aerion SBJ was a supersonic business jet concept designed by American firm Aerion Corporation. Unveiled in 2004, the designer sought a joint venture with a business aircraft manufacturer for a $1.2–1.4 billion development in 7–8 years. Aerion received 50 letters-of-intent before enlarging the design as the Aerion AS2 in 2014. Powered by two Pratt & Whitney JT8D-219 engines, the $80 million aircraft was to transport 8–12 passengers up to Mach 1.6 and up to 4,000 nmi (7,400 km).

Aerion abruptly announced on May 21, 2021 the company was shutting down due to lack of funding.

== Development ==
In 2003, Aerion commenced a search for a large aerospace partner, including Bombardier Aerospace and Dassault Aviation. The SBJ project was unveiled at the 2004 NBAA convention, backed by US billionaire Robert Bass, with introduction targeted at 2011 for a $1.2–1.4 billion development cost, anticipating a 250–300 aircraft civil market over 10 years. Aerion then planned wind tunnel testing in the second half of 2005, before partnerships and detailed design. Global Express lead designer John Holding joined Aerion in 2008 to lead advanced design.

Each customer put a $250,000 deposit. By 2010, the company claimed 50 letters-of-intent. By then, Aerion sought a joint venture with a business aircraft manufacturer for deliveries five to six years later.

In March 2012, UK-based Indigo Lyon joined Swiss ExecuJet Aviation Group as sales agents outside North America. By October 2013, the company expected flight testing to begin in 2019, to reach market in 2021. Aerion believes that their design will find a market, despite the US ban on supersonic flight, whereas Gulfstream views the ban as prohibitive. In 2014, the design was updated as the Aerion AS2, with length and takeoff weight increased to accommodate customer requests.

== Design ==
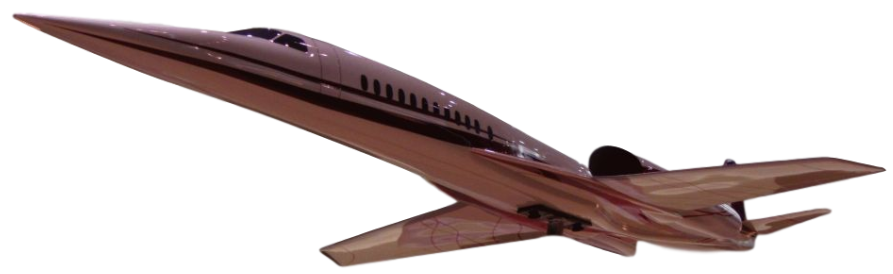
Aerion SBJ Model

The $80 million aircraft would transport 8–12 passengers up to Mach 1.6 and up to 4,000 nmi (7,400 km). It would have a conventional aluminium fuselage and a composite supersonic natural laminar flow wing, with existing Pratt & Whitney JT8D-219 engine for a 40,800 kg (90,000 lb) gross-weight. When necessary, it could also cruise efficiently just below the speed of sound at Mach .95-.99. If produced, it would allow practical non-stop travel from Europe to North America and back within one business day. The Aerion SBJ's key enabling technology, supersonic natural Laminar flow, has been conclusively demonstrated in transonic wind tunnel tests and in supersonic flight tests conducted in conjunction with NASA.

In the summer of 2010, an Aerion-designed calibration fixture was tested aboard a NASA F-15B. The experiments were intended to influence future laminar flow airfoil manufacturing standards for surface quality and assembly tolerances. A second test surface was flown during the first half of 2013, its design guided by the 2010 test. The new test surface was designed to provide large extents of laminar flow and be shaped so boundary layer instabilities grow relatively slowly and smoothly. These characteristics should facilitate good boundary layer imaging of the roughness and step-height experiments performed in next phase.

== Specifications (SBJ) ==
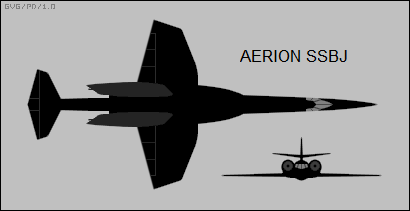
Silhouette of Aerion SBJ concept

Data from Aerion

General characteristics

- Crew: 2
- Capacity: up to 12 passengers
- Length: 148.3 ft (45.2 m)
- Wingspan: 64.2 ft (19.6 m)
- Height: 23.3 ft (7.1 m)
- Wing area: 1,200 sq ft (110 m^{2})
- Aspect ratio: 3.4
- Empty weight: 45,100 lb (20,457 kg)
- Max takeoff weight: 90,000 lb (40,823 kg)
- Fuel capacity: 45,400
- Cabin length × height × width: 30 ft × 6.2 ft × 6.5 ft (9.1 m × 1.9 m × 2.0 m)
- Powerplant: 2 × P&W JT8D-200 series turbofan, 19,600 lbf (87 kN) thrust each

Performance

- Maximum speed: Mach 1.6
- Minimum control speed: 140 mph (220 km/h, 120 kn) Approach speed
- Range: 4,800 mi (7,800 km, 4,200 nmi) at Mach 1.4
- Service ceiling: 51,000 ft (16,000 m)
- Wing loading: 75 lb/sq ft (370 kg/m^{2})
- Thrust/weight: 0.44
- Takeoff (BFL): 6,000 ft (1,800 m)
- Landing (wet): 3,460 ft (1,050 m)

== See also ==
- Supersonic business jet
- Supersonic transport

Related development

- Aerion AS2

Aircraft of comparable role, configuration, and era

- HyperMach SonicStar
- SAI Quiet Supersonic Transport
- Sukhoi-Gulfstream S-21
- Tupolev Tu-444

Related lists

- List of civil aircraft
