= Supersonic business jet =

Type of business jet

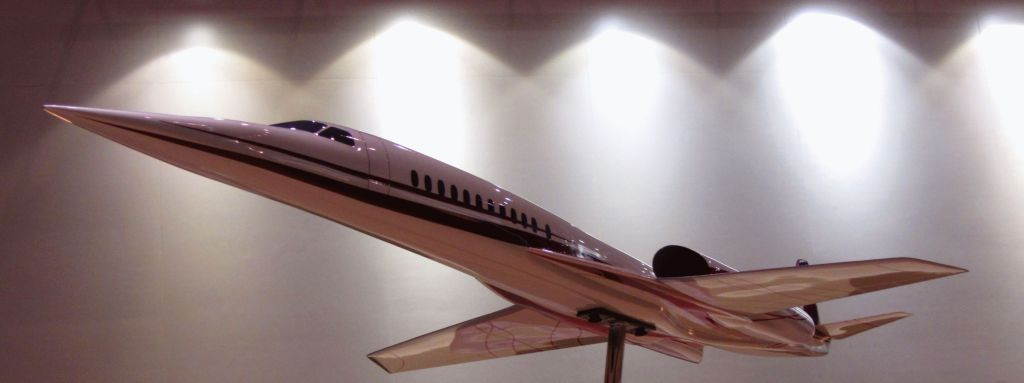
Aerion SBJ project model

A supersonic business jet (SSBJ) is a business jet travelling above the speed of sound, a supersonic aircraft. Some manufacturers are designing or have been designing SSBJs, but none is currently available. Usually intended to transport about 10 passengers, proposed SSBJs would be about the same size as subsonic business jets.

Only two commercial supersonic transports entered service - the Aérospatiale/British Aerospace Concorde and the Tupolev Tu-144. Both were designed with government subsidies and did not recoup development costs. They had high operating costs and faced heavy public and political opposition due to the sonic booms they created.

Some manufacturers believe these concerns can be addressed at a smaller scale, offering high-speed transport for small groups of high-value passengers, executives, or heads of state. Current proposals include the Boom Overture and the Spike S-512. Former proposals include the Aerion SBJ, Aerion AS2, HyperMach SonicStar, SAI Quiet Supersonic Transport, Sukhoi-Gulfstream S-21, and Tupolev Tu-444. Several companies, including Gulfstream Aerospace, work on sonic boom-mitigation technologies like the Quiet Spike.

== Timeline ==
In 1997, Dassault Aviation was considering a Mach 1.8 supersonic business jet powered by three nonafterburner engines derived from subsonic aircraft, with a cabin similar to the Falcon 50, capable of flying between Paris and New York. With a 40 t (88,000 lb) maimum takeoff weight and over 20 t (44,000 lb) of fuel, it would cover a range of 7,200 km (4,500 nmi). In September 2004, the European Commission selected the HISAC High Speed Aircraft program, launched with Dassault in 2005 and evaluating the feasibility of a small supersonic aircraft. By 2019, Dassault was reserved about the prospects for a supersonic business jet.

In 2018, Vladimir Putin proposed a civilian SSBJ variant of the Tu-160 bomber, for a potential market of 20-30 units in Russia alone at $100–120 million each. UAC previously studied a SSBJ, displaying a scale model at MAKS Air Show 2017, to be designed and built in seven years with an existing engine such as the NK-32 and a titanium airframe, a limited production would be worth an expected $150 million price.

In 2020, Virgin Galactic announced the design of a high-speed, delta-wing aircraft for 9 to 19 people, targeting Mach 3 above 60,000 ft (18,000 m), in partnership with Rolls-Royce plc for its propulsion.

In 2024, Boom Technology tested a subscale demonstrator Boom XB-1 "Baby Boom", achieving supersonic flight for the first time. Boom are currently developing this prototype into a full scale commercial aircraft, the Boom Overture.

== Gallery ==
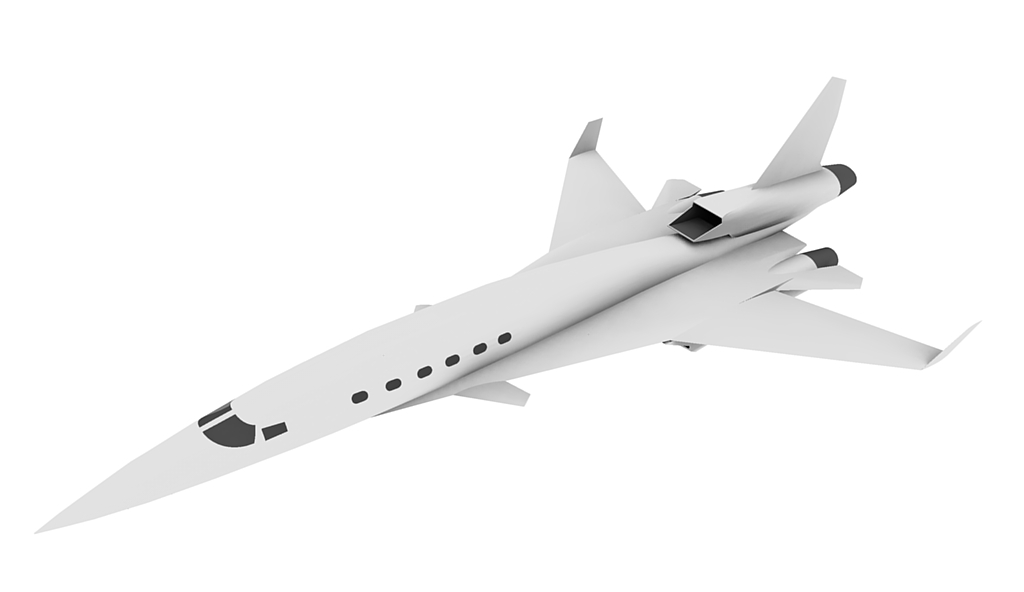
S-21 3D model

== See also ==
- Supersonic transport
- Supersonic aircraft
- Environmental impact of aviation – Effect of emissions from aircraft engines
