= Balanced field takeoff =

Aviation term

In aviation, a balanced field takeoff is a condition where the takeoff distance required (TODR) with one engine inoperative and the accelerate-stop distance are equal for the aircraft weight, engine thrust, aircraft configuration and runway condition. For a given aircraft weight, engine thrust, aircraft configuration, and runway condition, the shortest runway length that complies with safety regulations is the balanced field length.

The takeoff decision speed V_{1} is the fastest speed at which the pilot can still take the first actions to reject the takeoff (e.g. reduce thrust, apply brakes, deploy speed brakes). At speeds below V_{1} the aircraft can be brought to a halt before the end of the runway. At V_{1} and above, the pilot should continue the takeoff even if an emergency is recognized. The speed will ensure the aircraft achieves the required height above the takeoff surface within the takeoff distance.

To achieve a balanced field takeoff, V_{1} is selected so the take-off distance with one engine inoperative, and the accelerate-stop distance, are equal. When the runway length is equal to the balanced field length only one value for V_{1} will exist. Aviation regulations (for transport category aircraft) require the takeoff distance with one engine inoperative to be no greater than the take-off distance available (TODA); and the accelerate-stop distance to be no greater than the accelerate-stop distance available (ASDA).

On runways longer than the balanced field length for the aircraft weight the operator may be able to choose V_{1} from a range of speeds if adequate information is supplied by the aircraft manufacturer. The slowest speed in this range will be determined by the Take Off Distance Available (TODA). For a low V_{1}, if an engine fails just above V_{1}, the acceleration to V_{R} on one engine will take more distance. Whereas, if an engine fails before a low V_{1}, it will take less distance to stop, so the Accelerate Stop Distance Required (ASDR) is lower. By contrast, the fastest speed in this range will be determined by the Accelerate Stop Distance Available (ASDA). If an engine fails above a high V_{1}, it will take less distance to reach V_{R}, so Take Off Distance Required (TODR) is lower. Whereas, if an engine fails just below a high V_{1}, it will take more distance to stop, so the Accelerate Stop Distance Required is greater.

Alternatively, on runways longer than the balanced field length the pilot can use reduced thrust, resulting in the balanced field length again being equal to the runway length available.

Factors affecting the balanced field length include:

- the mass of the aircraft – higher mass results in slower acceleration and higher takeoff speed
- engine thrust – affected by temperature and air pressure, but reduced thrust can also be deliberately selected by the pilot
- density altitude – reduced air pressure or increased temperature increases minimum take off speed
- aircraft configuration such as wing flap position
- runway slope and runway wind component
- runway conditions – a rough or soft field slows acceleration, a wet or icy field reduces braking

== Technology ==
Calculation of the balanced field length traditionally involves relying on an expansion program model, where the various forces are evaluated as a function of speed, and step-wise integrated, using an estimate for V_{1}. The process is iterated with different values for the engine failure speed until the accelerate-stop and accelerate-go distances are equal. This process suffers from the inherently slow and repetitive approach, which is also subject to round-off errors if the speed increment between the steps is not carefully selected, which could cause some issues in first principle aircraft performance models provided to airlines for day-to-day operations. Alternate approaches using a more mathematically complex but inherently more accurate and faster algebraic integration method have however been developed.

Landing and Takeoff Performance Monitoring Systems are devices aimed at providing the pilot with information on the validity of the performance computation, and averting runway overruns that occur in situations not adequately addressed by the takeoff V-speeds concept.

== See also ==
- Flight planning
- Index of aviation articles
- Takeoff
- V speeds
