= Pratt & Whitney JT8D =

1963 turbofan engine family

JT8D
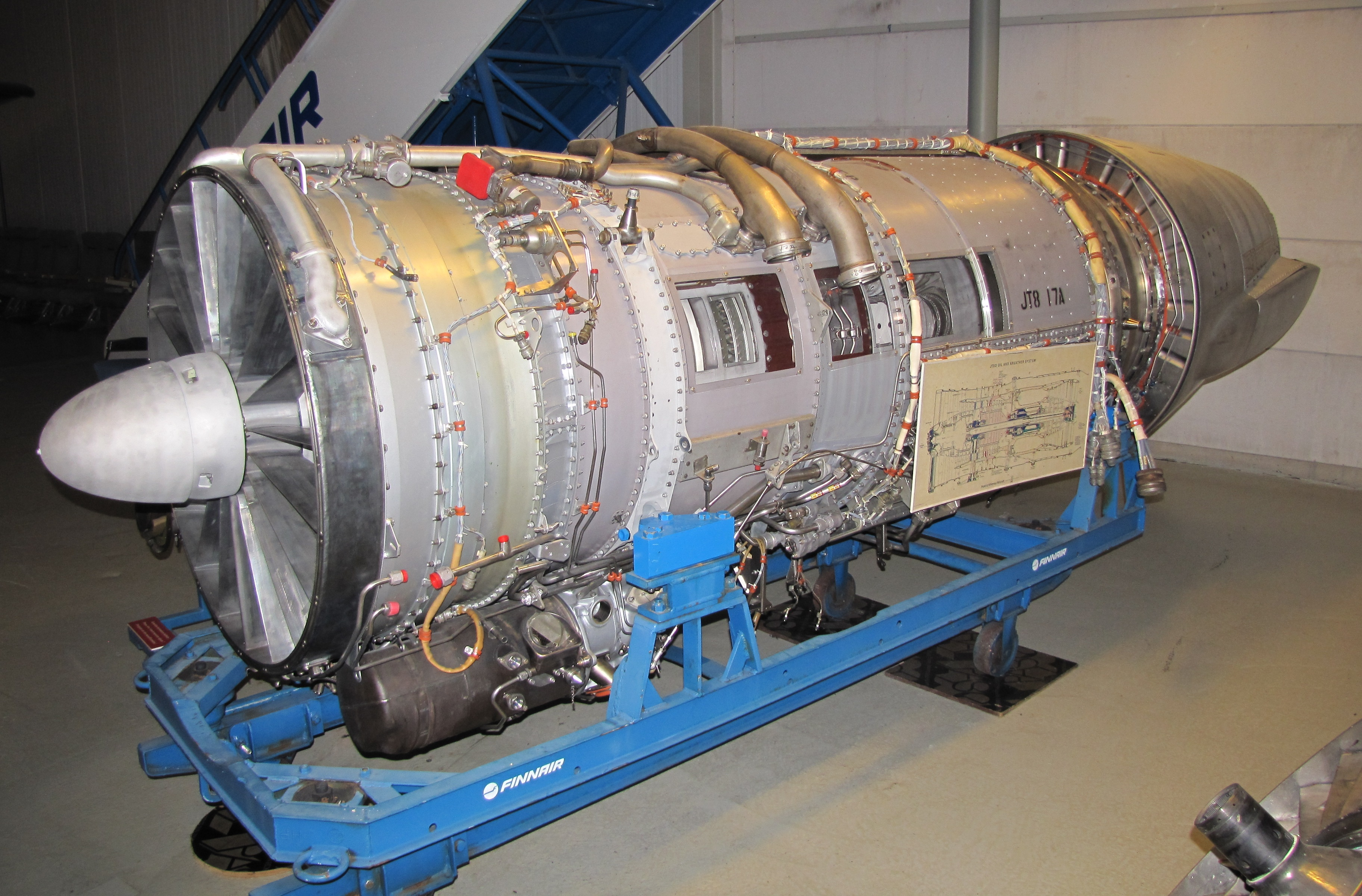
- The JT8D is a low-bypass turbofan often used on early narrowbody jetliners
- Type: Turbofan
- National origin: United States
- Manufacturer: Pratt & Whitney
- First run: 1960
- Major applications: Boeing 727; Boeing 737-100/-200; McDonnell Douglas DC-9; McDonnell Douglas MD-80; Dassault Mercure
- Number built: 14,750
- Developed from: Pratt & Whitney J52
- Developed into: Volvo RM8

The Pratt & Whitney JT8D is a low-bypass (0.96 to 1) turbofan engine introduced by Pratt & Whitney in February 1963 with the inaugural flight of the Boeing 727. It was a modification of the Pratt & Whitney J52 turbojet. Eight models comprise the JT8D standard engine family, covering the thrust range from 12,250 to 17,400 lbf (54,500 to 77,400 N), and powered the 727, 737-100/200, and DC-9. The updated JT8D-200 family, covering the 18,900 to 21,000 lbf (84,000 to 93,000 N), powered the MD-80 and re-engined Super 27 aircraft. The JT8D was built under license in Sweden as the Volvo RM8, a redesigned afterburning derivative for the Saab 37 Viggen fighter. Pratt & Whitney also sells static versions for powerplant and ship propulsion as the FT8.

== Design ==
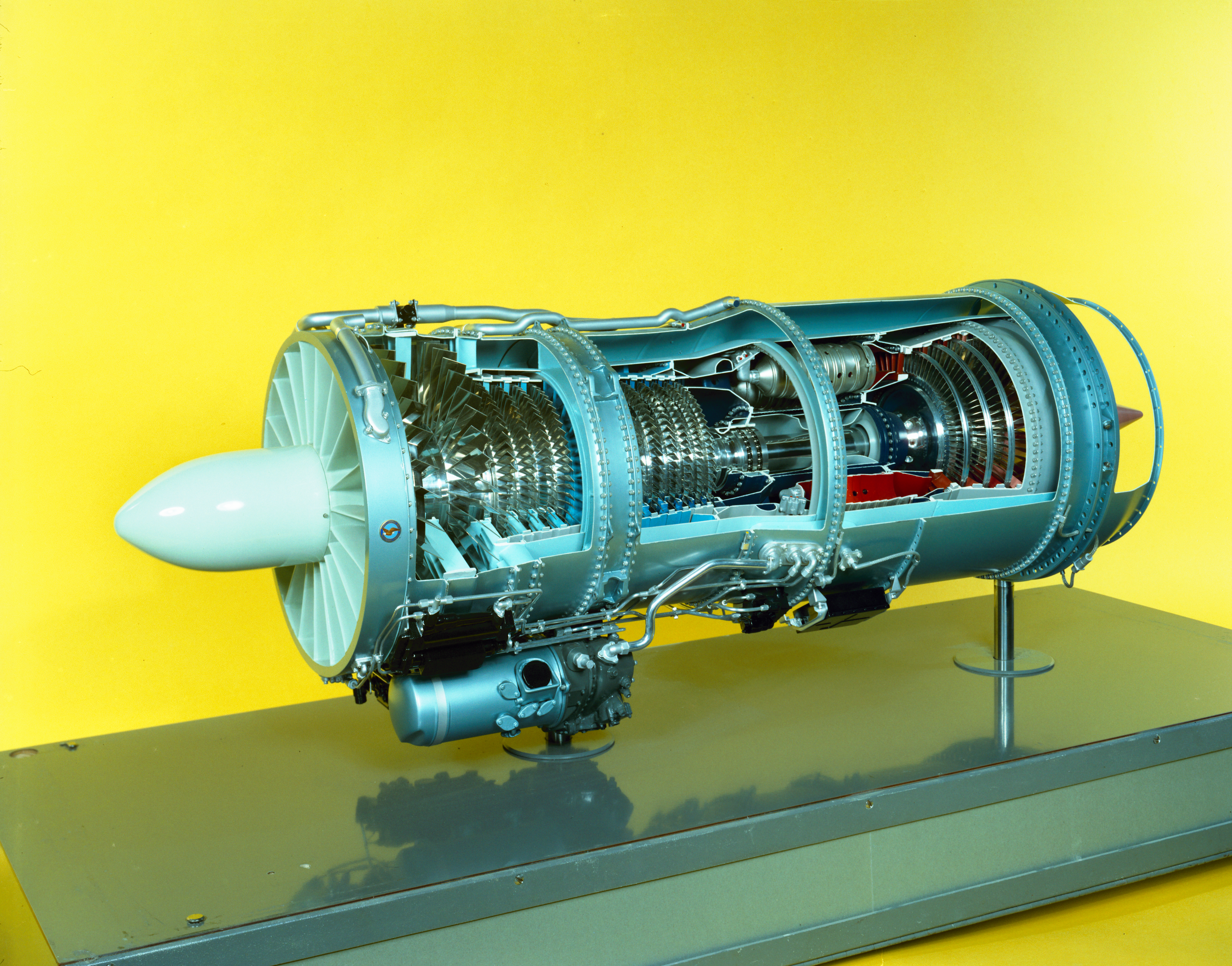
Cutaway showing the configuration: twin fan, axial compressor stages, cannular combustors and 4-stage turbine

The JT8D is an axial-flow front turbofan engine incorporating a two-spool design. There are two coaxially-mounted independent rotating assemblies: one rotating assembly for the low pressure compressor (LPC) which consists of the first six stages (i.e. six pairs of rotating and stator blades, including the first two stages which are for the bypass turbofan), driven by the second (downstream) turbine (which consists of three stages); and a second rotating assembly for the high-pressure compressor (HPC) section, which has seven stages. The high-pressure compressor is driven by the first (upstream) turbine, which has a single stage.

The front-mounted bypass fan has two stages. The annular discharge duct for the bypass fan runs along the full length of the engine, so that both the fan air and exhaust gases can exit through the same nozzle. This arrangement allows some noise attenuation, in that the still-hot fast-moving turbine exhaust is shrouded in much-cooler and slower-moving air (from the bypass fan) before interacting with ambient air. Thus, the JT8D noise levels were significantly reduced from previous non-turbofan engines, although the low bypass ratio meant that, compared to subsequently developed turbofans, high noise levels were still produced.

Within the fan inlet case, there are anti-icing air bosses and probes to sense the inlet pressure and temperature. Similar units exist throughout the engine to check temperatures and pressures.

At the 13th (i.e. the final) compressor stage, air is bled out and used for anti-icing. The amount is controlled by the Pressure Ratio Bleed Control sense signal (PRBC). The diffuser case at the aft end of the compressor houses the 13th stage. Its increasing cross-sectional area allows the compressed air to slow down before entering one of the engine's nine burner cans. Again, there are two bosses to extract 13th stage air for anti-icing, de-icing of fuel, and airframe (cabin pressurization) use. Not all the compressed air enters the burner cans at the fuel-ignition point; some bypasses the can completely and cools the first turbine stage, and some is gradually introduced into the burner can's perimeter in such a way that the burning fuel is held near the can's centerline.

There are nine combustion chambers positioned in a can-annular arrangement. Each chamber has three air inlet hole sizes: the smallest is for cooling, the medium is for burning and the largest for forming an air blanket.

Details

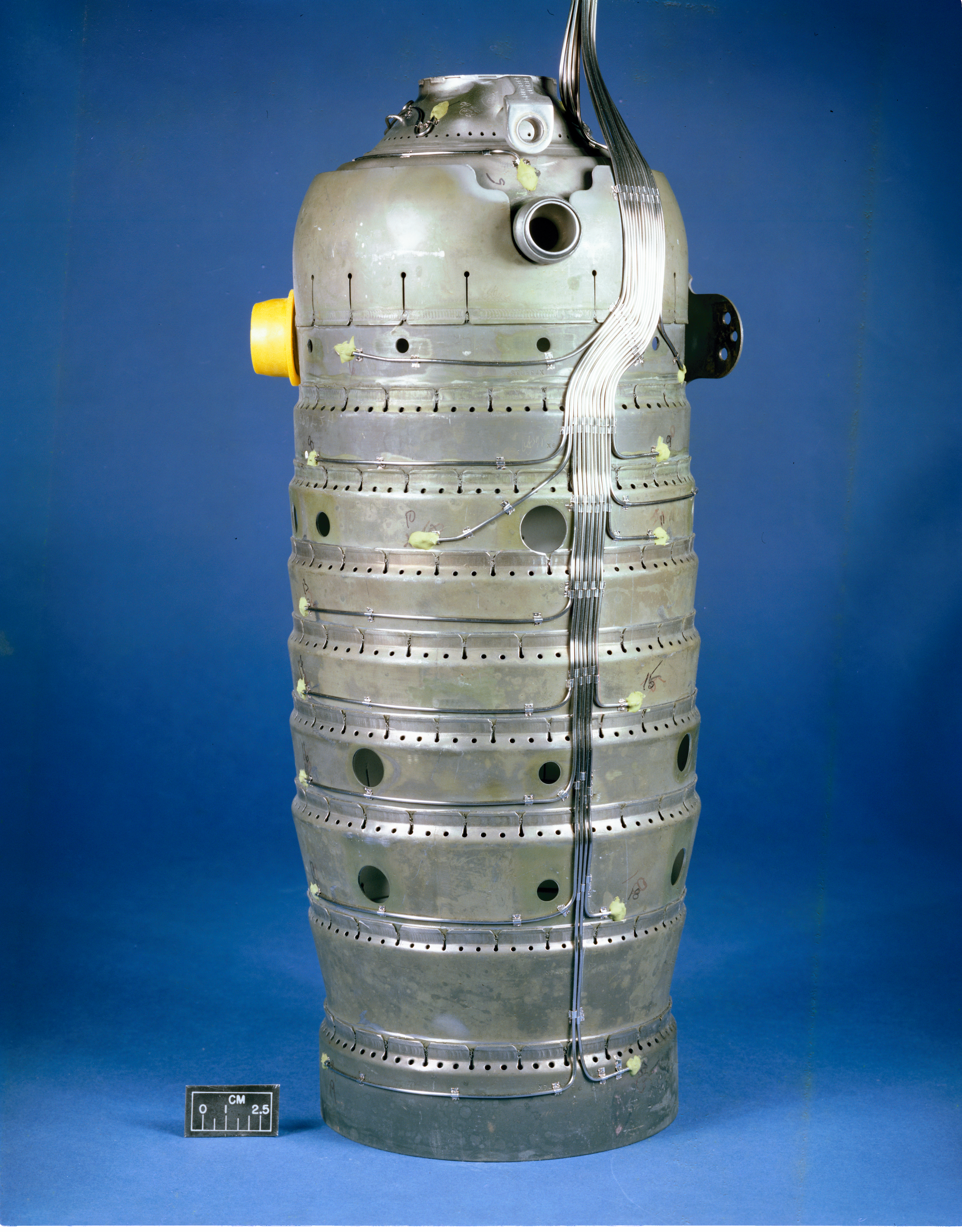
Cannular combustor

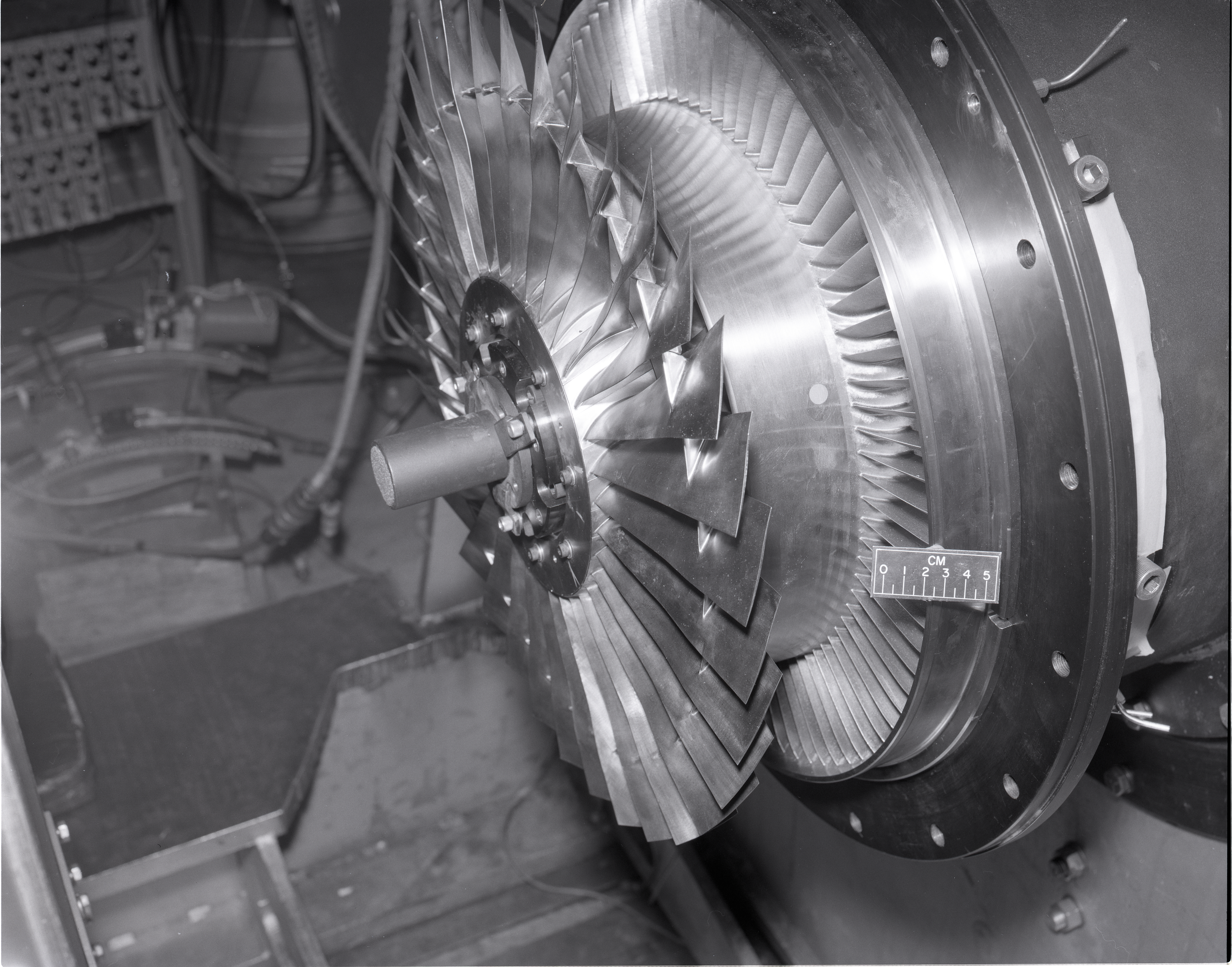
20 in (510 mm) diameter rotor and bypass stator

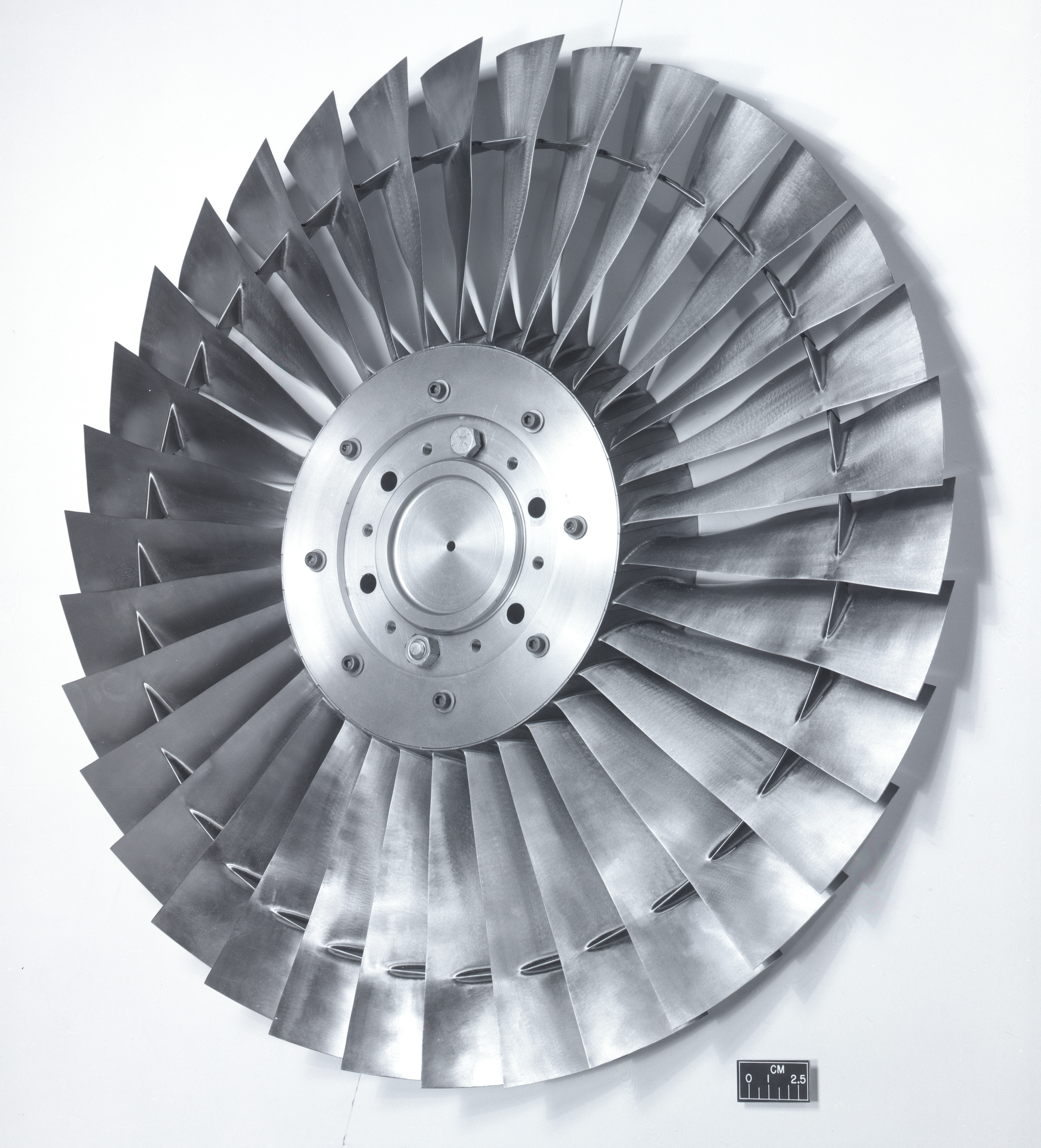
Compressor fan

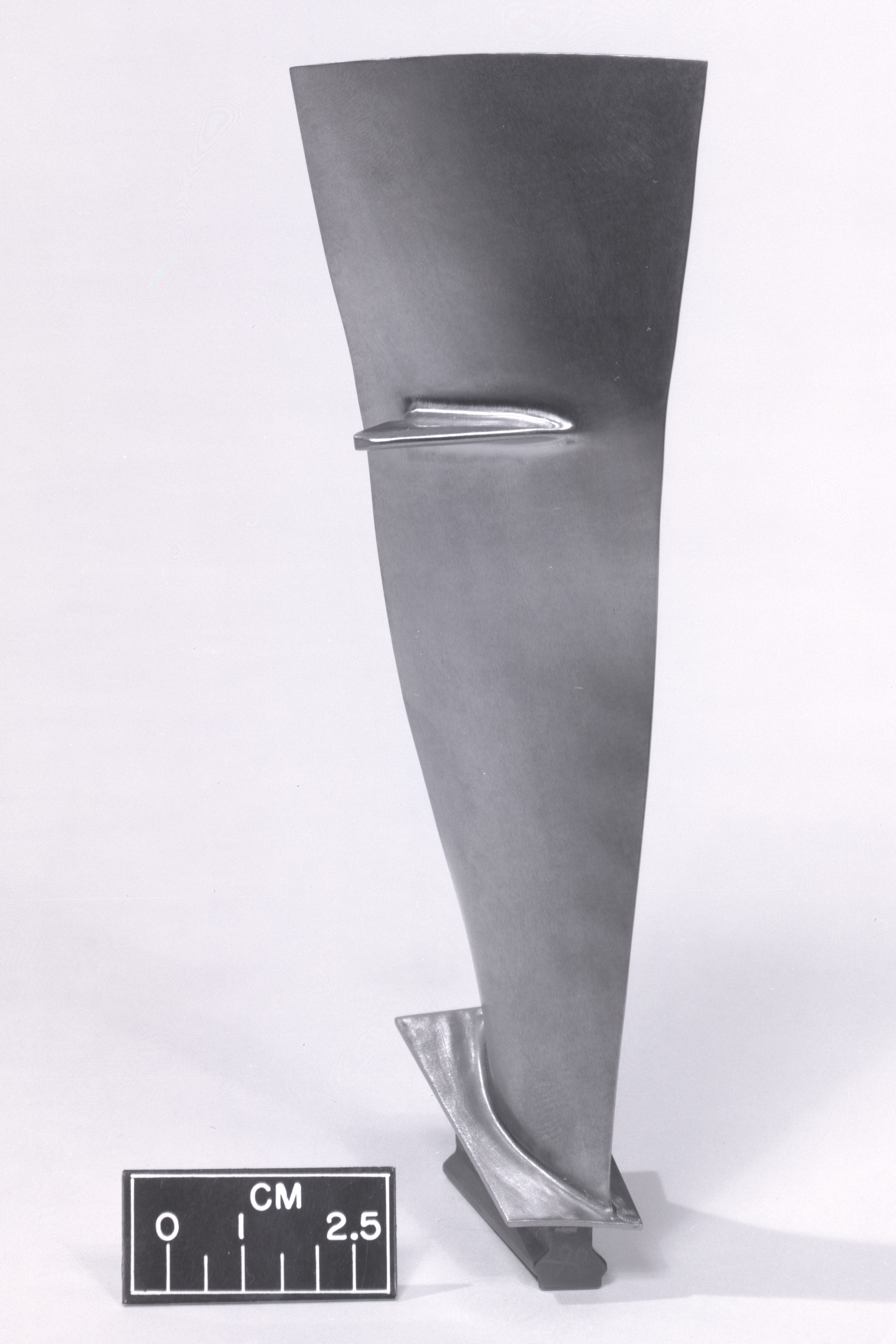
Fan blade

=== Update programs ===
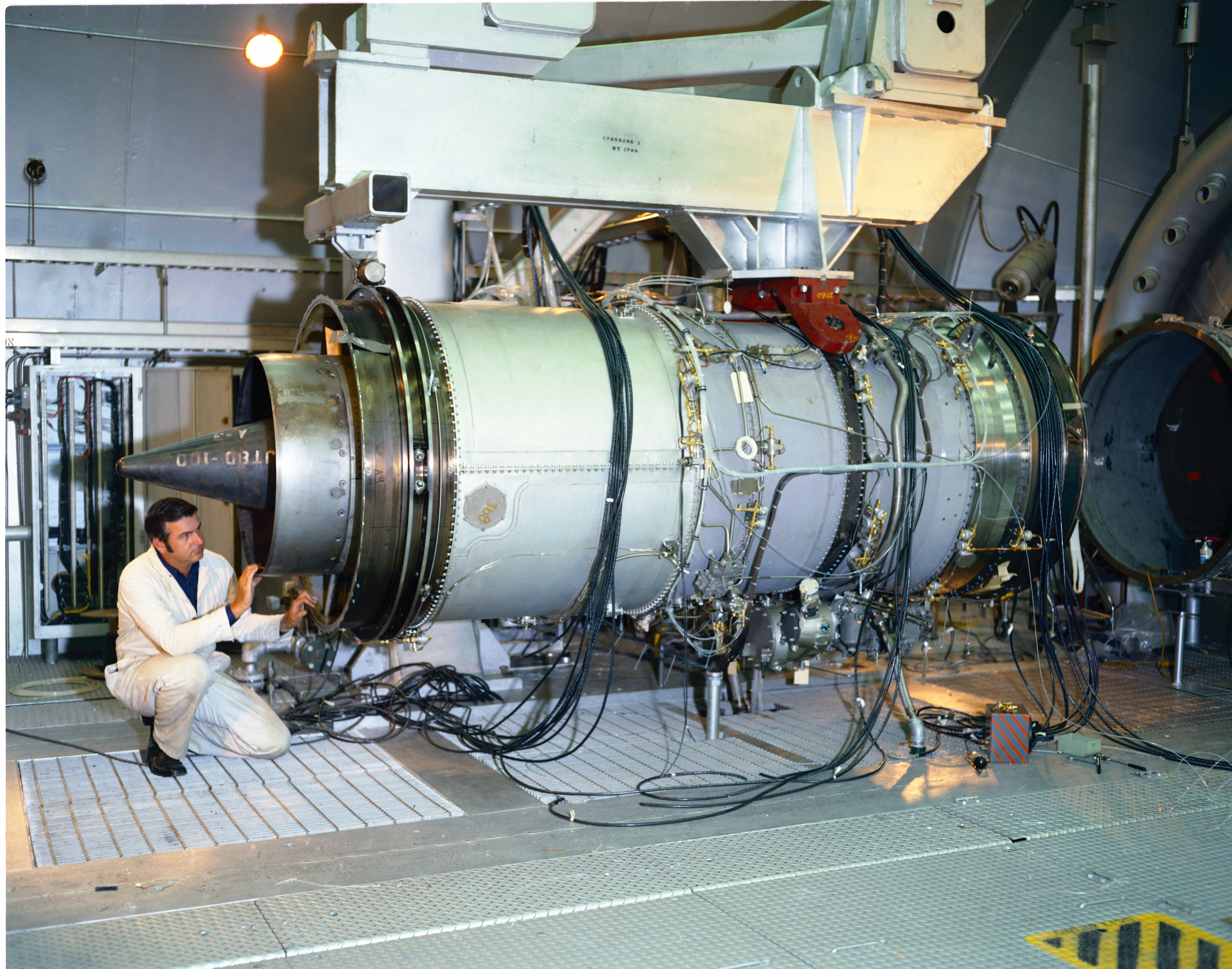
JT8D-200 prototype testing at the Glenn Research Center in 1974

In response to environmental concerns that began in the 1970s, the company began developing a new version of the engine, the JT8D-200 series. Designed to be quieter, cleaner, more efficient, yet more powerful than earlier models, the -200 Series power-plant was re-engineered with a significantly higher bypass ratio (1.74 to 1) covering the 18,500 to 21,700 lbf (82 to 97 kN) thrust range powering the McDonnell Douglas MD-80 series. This increase was achieved by increasing bypass fan diameter from 39.9 inches (101 cm) to 49.2 inches (125 cm) and reducing fan pressure ratio (from 2.21 to 1.92). Overall engine pressure ratio was also increased from 15.4 to 21.0. from service entry in 1980, more than 2,900 of the -200 series engines have been produced.

The JT8D-217 and -219 engine(s) were tested in 2001 and were deemed suitable replacements for the old TF33 engines on military and commercial aircraft as part of the Super 27 re-engining program. The updated engines offer reduced (Stage-3) noise compliance standards without the need for hush kits, enhanced short field performance, and steeper and faster climb rates with roughly a 10% reduction in fuel burn to extend range.

Pratt & Whitney, in a joint venture with Seven Q Seven (SQS) and Omega Air, developed the JT8D-219 as a re-engine powerplant for Boeing 707-based aircraft. Northrop Grumman used the -219 to re-engine one of the United States Air Force's fleet of 19 Joint Surveillance Target Attack Radar System (E-8 Joint STARS) aircraft, which would allow the JSTARS more time on station due to the engine's 17% greater fuel efficiency. However these plans were cancelled after the single conversion when the decision was taken to retire the platform. NATO originally planned to re-engine their fleet of E-3 Sentry AWACS aircraft, however again this was cancelled after the decision was taken to retire the E-3 platform in preference for the E-7 Wedgetail. The -219 is publicized as being half the cost of the competing 707 re-engine powerplant, the CFM International CFM56, for reasons of geometrical and balance similarity to the engine it is replacing and the associated relative up-front wing modification costs of the two choices.

The proposed Aerion SBJ supersonic business jet, previously under development, was to use a pair of JT8D-219 engines for sustained supersonic flight.

== Variants ==
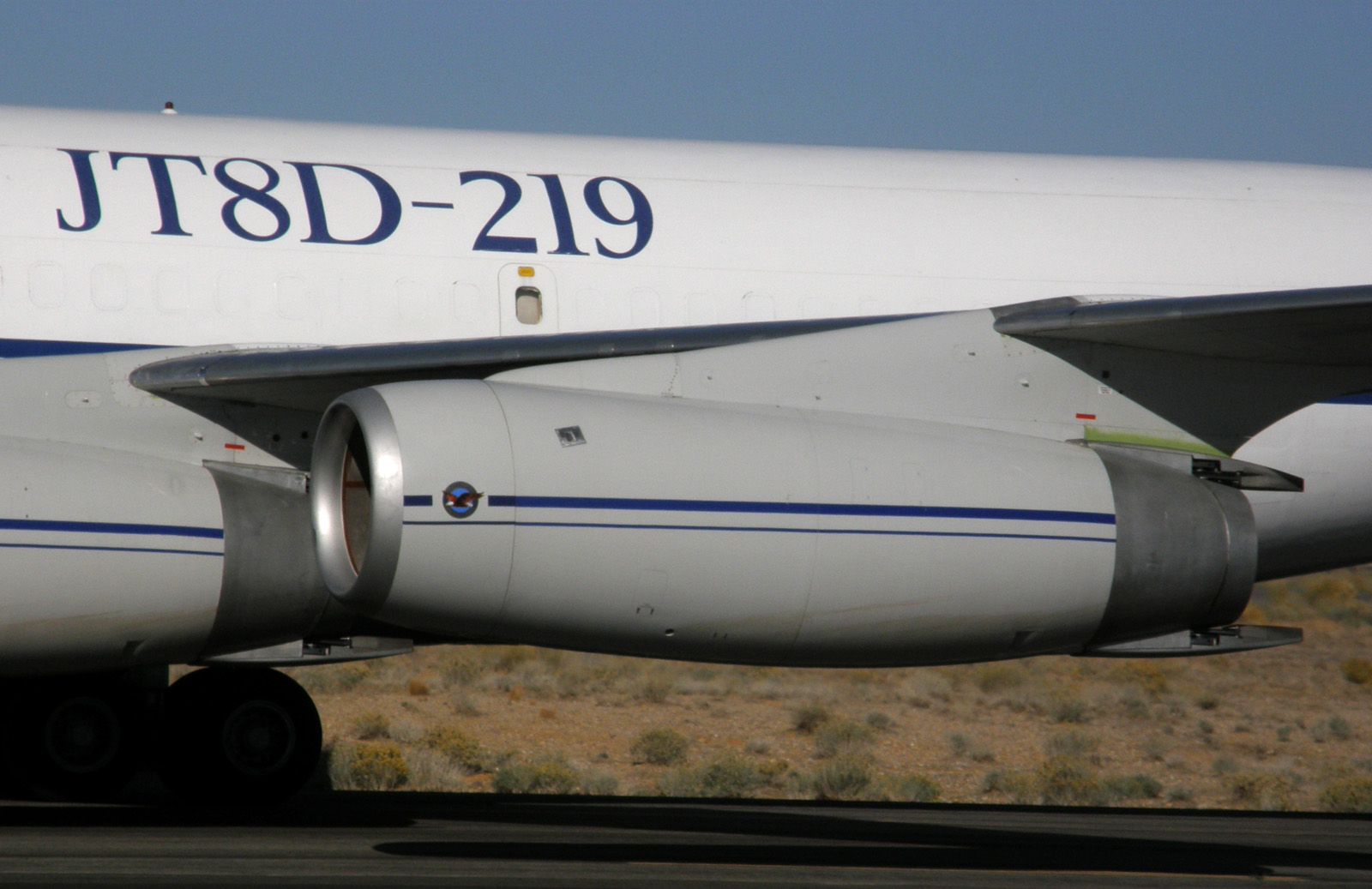
JT8D-219 on the Omega Air Boeing 707RE flight test aircraft at the Mojave Airport

Series	Initial J52 derived variants				Updated -200 series		
Model	-1(A/B)/7(A/B) /9(A)/11	-5	-15(A)	-17(A/R/AR)	-209	-217(A/C)	-219
Certification	Feb 1, 1963		Apr 7, 1971	Feb 1, 1974	Jun 22, 1979	Oct 31, 1980	Feb 22, 1985
Compressor	axial 13-stage				axial 14-stage		
Combustors, turbine	9 can-annular, 4-stage						
Maximum Thrust	14,000–15,000 lbf 62–67 kN	12,250 lbf 54.5 kN	15,550 lbf 69.2 kN	17,000–17,400 lbf 76–77 kN	18,900 lbf 84 kN	20,000 lbf 89 kN	21,000 lbf 93 kN
Length	123.56 in (3,138 mm)				154.20 in (3,917 mm)		
Width	40.0 in (1,020 mm)				49.2 in (1,250 mm)		
Dry Weight	3,205–3,402 lb 1,454–1,543 kg	3,205 lb 1,454 kg	3,414–3,474 lb 1,549–1,576 kg	3,430–3,500 lb 1,560–1,590 kg	4,588 lb 2,081 kg	4,623–4,684 lb 2,097–2,125 kg	4,684 lb 2,125 kg
LP rpm	8,600	8,500	8,800	8,800-8,900	7,850	7,770-8,080	8,120
HP rpm	12,250	12,100	12,250	12,250-12,280	12,150	12,285-12,350	12,350

== Production ==
More than 14,000 JT8D engines have been produced, totaling more than 500 million hours of service, with more than 350 operators, making it the most popular of all low-bypass turbofan engines ever produced. Regular production ended in 1985, but some replacement engines were produced for military aircraft in 2011. Mainline airline use of the JT8D continued until 2020 when Delta Air Lines retired their MD-88 fleet early due to the COVID-19 pandemic.

== Applications ==
- Aerion SBJ – proposed, not built
- Boeing 707RE
- Boeing 727 - Re-Engined Super 27s have JT8D-200s
- Boeing 737-100/-200
- Dassault Mercure
- Kawasaki C-1
- McDonnell Douglas DC-9
- McDonnell Douglas MD-80 series - JT8D-200s only
- McDonnell Douglas YC-15
- Northrop Grumman E-8C Joint STARS – single testbed only
- Sud Aviation Caravelle 10B, 10R, 11R, and 12
- Pratt & Whitney FT8 MobilePac and SwiftPac mobile generators
Installations

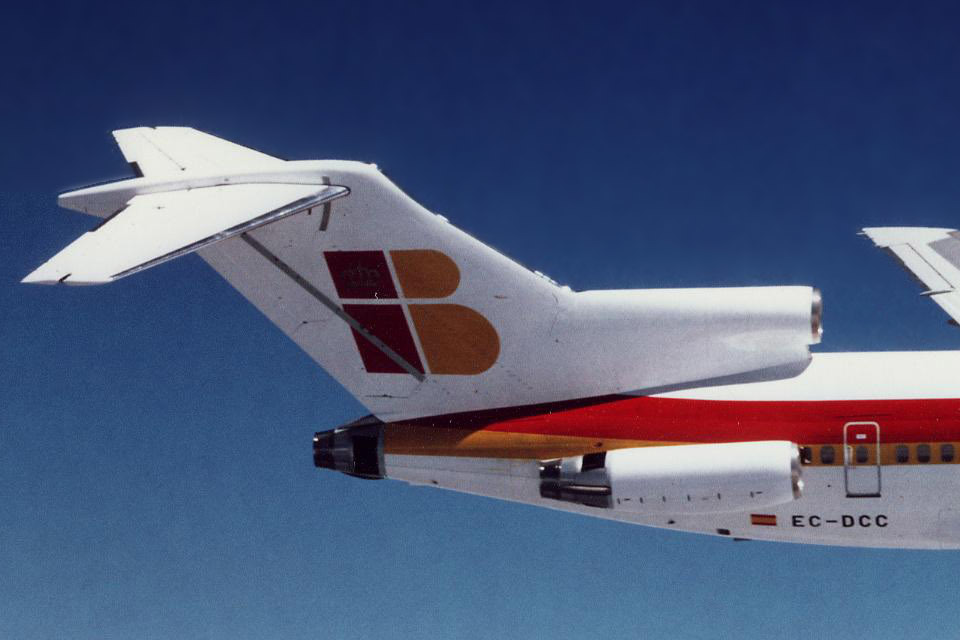
Boeing 727

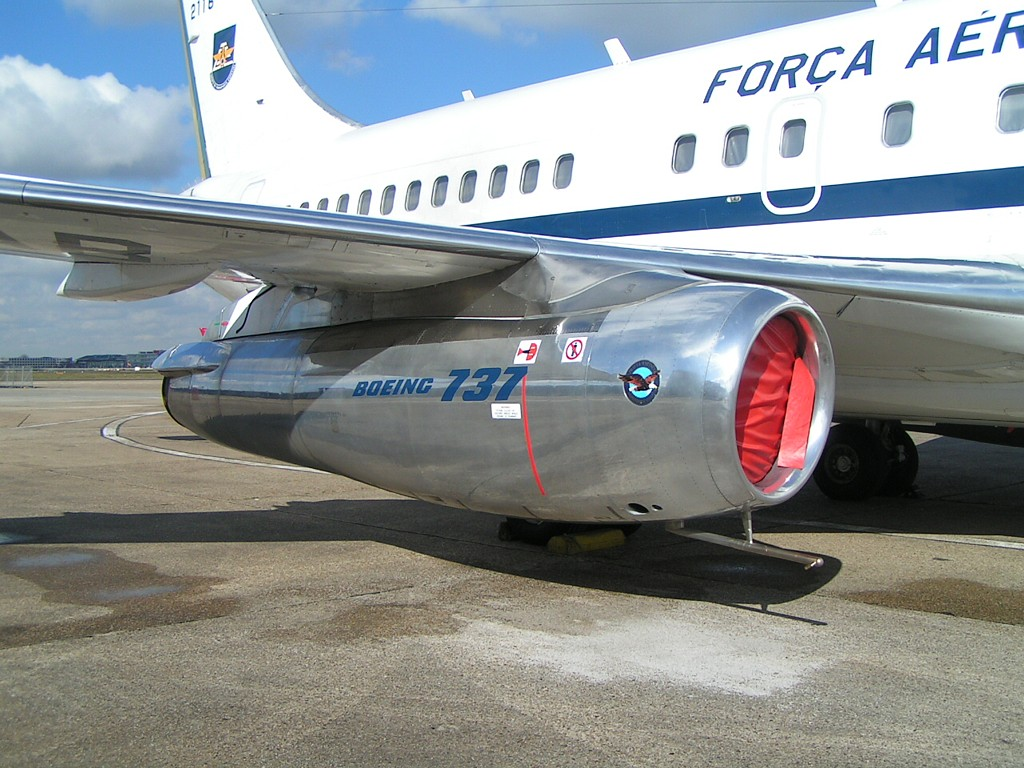
Boeing 737

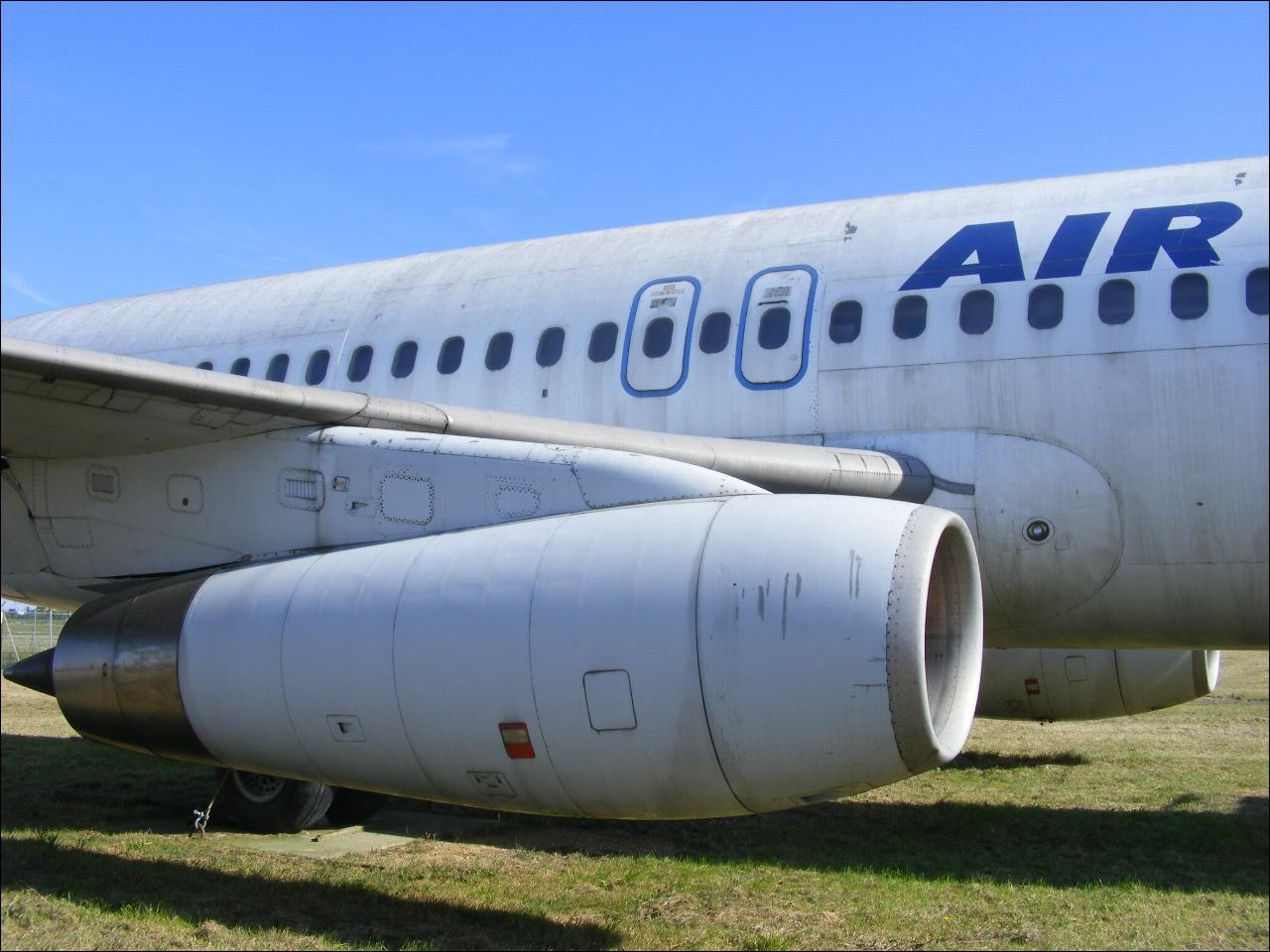
Dassault Mercure

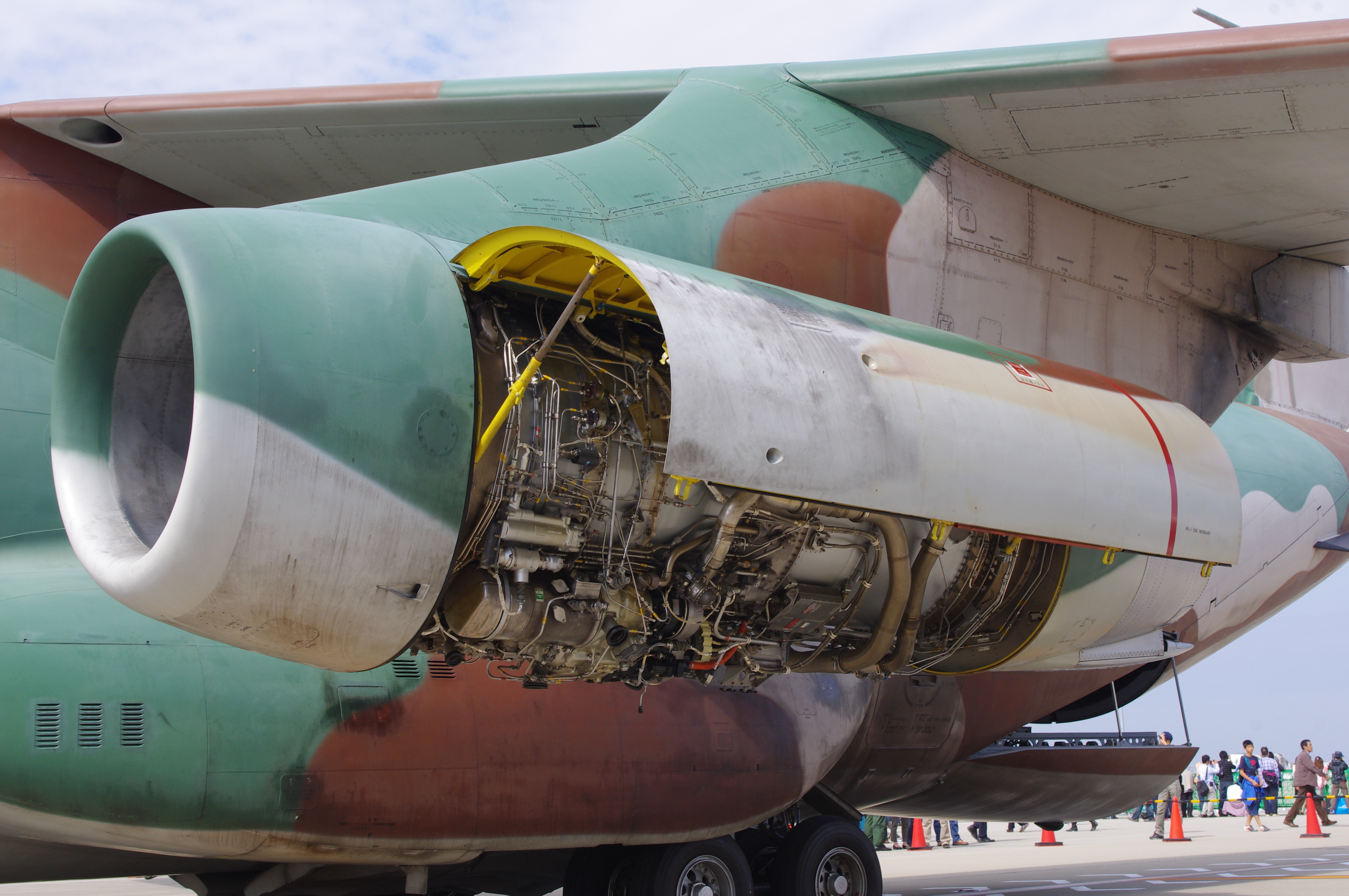
Kawasaki C-1

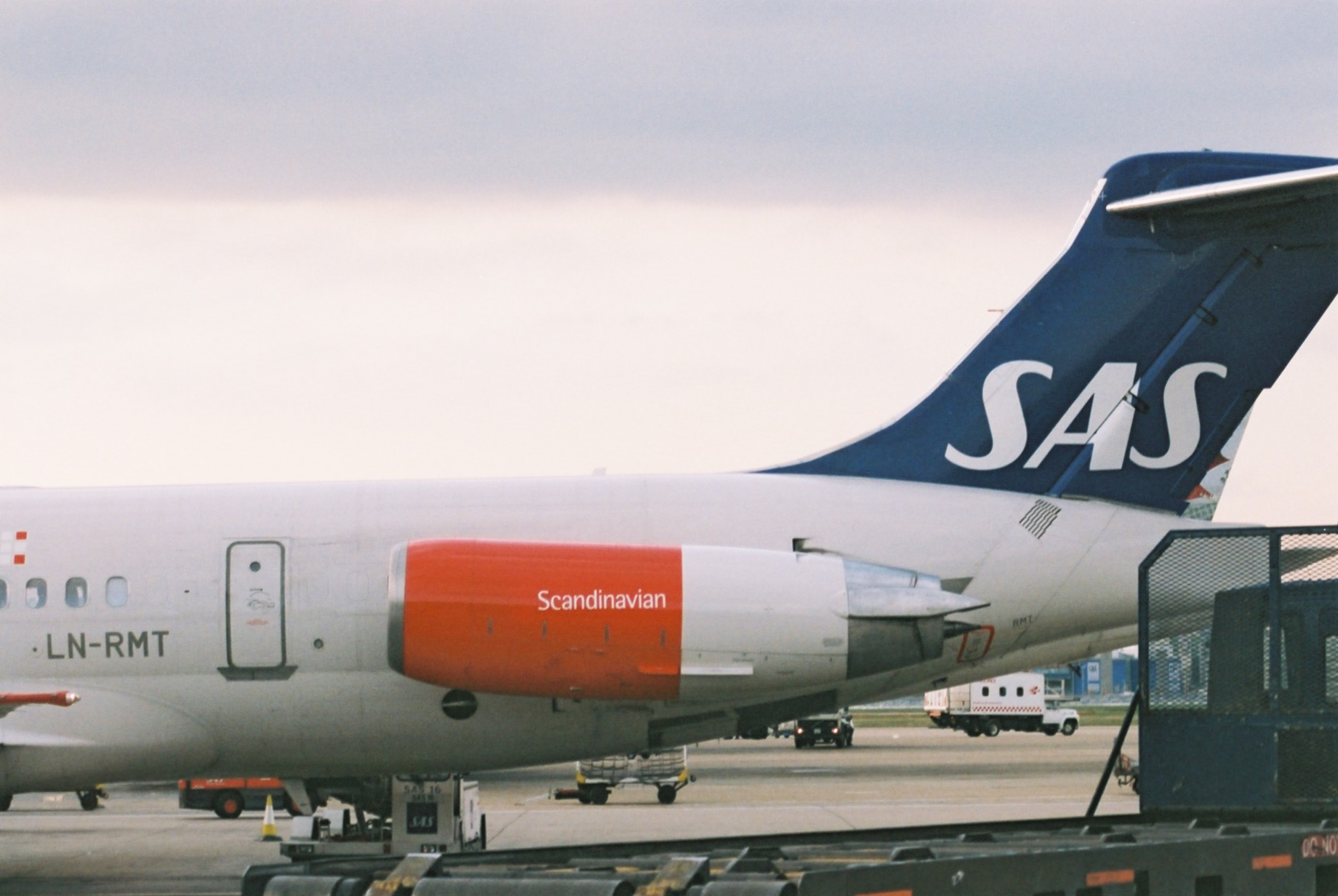
McDonnell Douglas MD-80

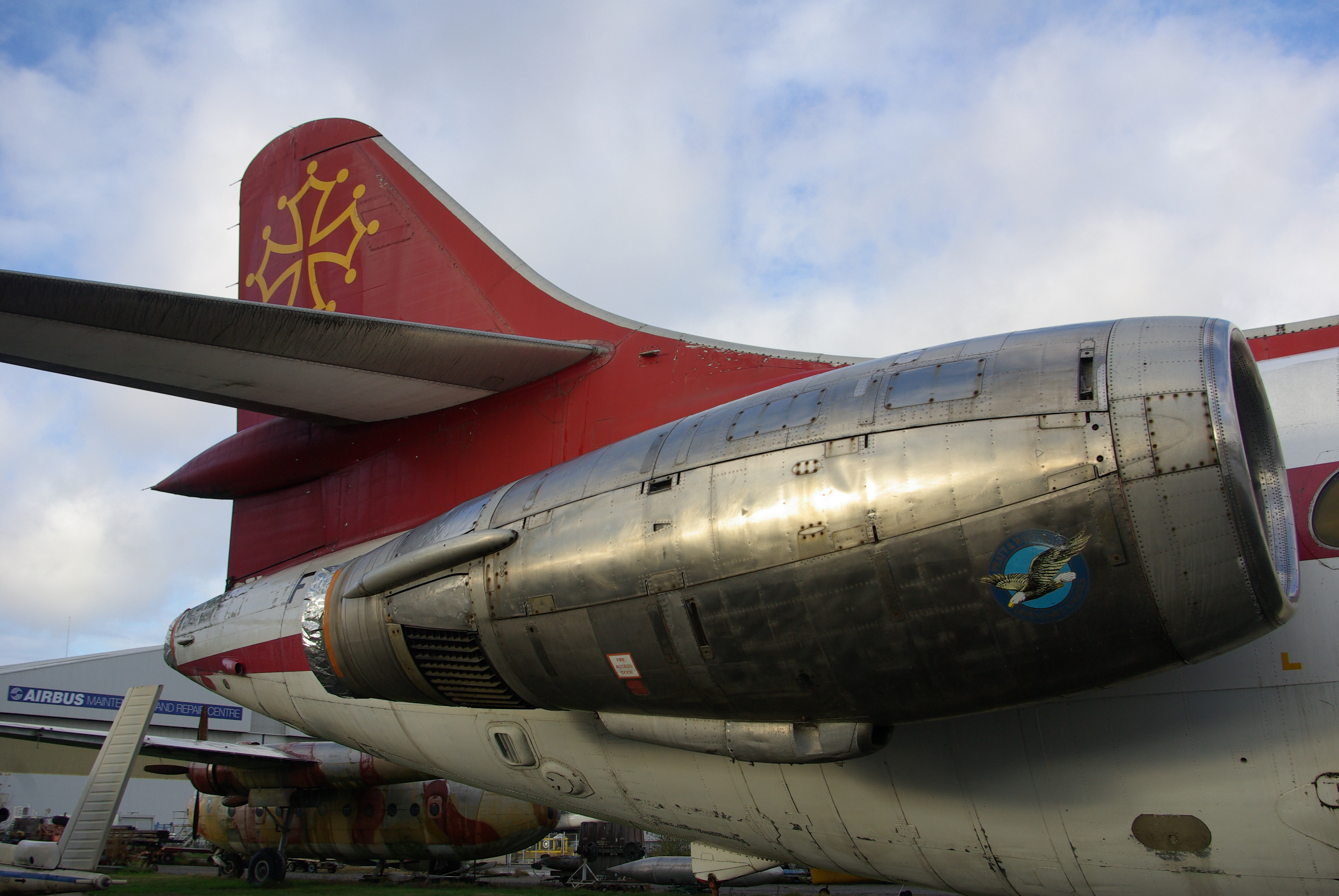
Sud Aviation Caravelle

== Accidents ==
18 January 1969
United Air Lines Flight 266 – ten minutes after takeoff, the cockpit received a warning from Engine 1 of an engine fire and cut off power to that engine. A minute later, Flight UA266 suffered a total loss of electrical power, which disabled the aircraft's flight instruments. At 13 minutes after take-off, the plane crashed into the Pacific Ocean, just 12 miles off the coast, killing all 38 people aboard the aircraft, which consisted of 32 passengers and 6 crew members.
4 April 1977
Southern Airways Flight 242 – both engines on the DC-9 failed when the pilots flew into a severe thunderstorm after misreading their onboard radar. The flight encountered severe rain and hail. The NTSB concluded that the "loss of thrust was caused by the ingestion of massive amounts of water and hail which in combination with thrust lever movement induced severe stalling in and major damage to the engine compressors". Some 63 people on board and 9 on the ground died as a result of the accident.
22 August 1985
British Airtours Flight 28M – an engine failed during take-off from Manchester Airport and a fire spread into the cabin, resulting in 55 fatalities aboard the Boeing 737-236 Advanced.
6 September 1985
Midwest Express Flight 105 – the NTSB concluded that an unconfined failure of the 9th - 10th stage compressor spacer occurred immediately after takeoff from Milwaukee Mitchell International Airport (then called Billy Mitchell Field). The plane was observed to have slowed significantly as a result of the engine loss and experienced an accelerated stall condition. The plane rolled to the right 90 degrees and crashed just south of the runway, resulting in 31 fatalities (all passengers and crew) aboard the McDonnell-Douglas DC-9 aircraft.
3 May 1991
Ryan International Airlines – unconfined failure of 9th stage compressor disc penetrated fuel lines and fuselage on the tarmac at Bradley International Airport causing fire and complete loss of aircraft. No fatalities reported.
27 December 1991
Scandinavian Airlines Flight 751 – the engines on an MD-81 ingested wing ice during takeoff causing engine damage that led to a total loss of thrust on both engines. The aircraft crashed in a forest clearing with no fatalities.
6 July 1996
An engine explosion happened on an MD-88, Delta Air Lines Flight 1288, just prior to take-off at Pensacola, Florida, USA, with two fatalities.
6 March 2003
A 737-200 operated by Air Algérie crashed due to sudden loss of thrust as a result of a failure in the high pressure turbine section of the left engine and the captain taking controls off of the first officer without assessing or mentally preparing for the situation. All 6 crew and 96 of the 97 passengers were killed.
7 November 2007
Nationwide Airlines Flight 723 – the right-hand engine of a 737-200 detached from Flight 723 during rotation. The pilots managed to execute an emergency landing saving all 112 passengers and crew onboard.
15 April 2008
Hewa Bora Airways Flight 122 – A DC-9-51 operated by Hewa Bora Airways crashed and burned at Goma following an engine fire, with 40 fatalities.
2 July 2021
Transair Flight 810 – one engine on the Boeing 737-200 cargo aircraft failed en route from Honolulu to the neighboring Hawaiian island of Maui. The crew attempted to turn back to Honolulu's Daniel K. Inouye International Airport, but the plane's second engine overheated, forcing the two pilots on board to ditch the airplane about 4 miles (6.4 km) off the southern coast of Oahu. Both pilots were rescued by the United States Coast Guard.
19 October 2021
2021 Houston MD-87 crash – A privately owned MD-87 was recorded on its takeoff roll just after throttling up a "puff of smoke" was observed from the left engine nacelle. Subsequently the aircraft rolled off the end of the runway into a grass field and caught fire. The MD-87 was almost completely destroyed by the resulting fire. The privately owned jet, N987AK McDonnell Douglas MD-87, owned by J. Alan Kent Development LLC, was operating a charter flight carrying sports fans to Boston for the ALCS Championship Baseball Games. Only one minor injury and no fatalities occurred in this incident.

== Specifications (JT8D-219) ==
Data from

==== General characteristics ====
- Type: Dual-spool, low-bypass turbofan
- Length: 154 in (390 cm)
- Diameter: 49.2 in (125 cm) fan
- Dry weight: 4,741 lb (2,150 kg)

==== Components ====
- Compressor: Axial flow, 1-stage fan, 6-stage LP, 7-stage HP
- Combustors: Nine can-annular ("cannular") chambers
- Turbine: 1 stage HP, 3 stage LP

==== Performance ====
- Maximum thrust: 21,000 lbf (93 kN)
- Overall pressure ratio: 19.4
- Air mass flow: 144.7 kg/s (19,140 lb/min) for -9, 211.83 kg/s (28,020 lb/min) for -109
- Fuel consumption: 19% reduction over JT3D
- Specific fuel consumption: 22.661 g/(kN⋅s) (0.8000 lb/(lbf⋅h))
- Thrust-to-weight ratio: 4.43

== See also ==
Related development

- Pratt & Whitney J52
- Volvo RM8

Comparable engines

- Kuznetsov NK-8
- Rolls-Royce Spey
- Soloviev D-30

Related lists

- List of aircraft engines
