= HyperMach SonicStar =

Supersonic business jet proposal

SonicStar

General information
- Type: High Supersonic Passenger transport
- Manufacturer: HyperMach Aerospace Industries (UK)
- Designer: SonicStar SAS
- Status: Development aborted
- Number built: 0

The SonicStar was a proposed high-supersonic aircraft business jet designed by SonicStar SAS led by Bernard Rousset.

CEO Richard H. Lugg & COO Bernard Rousset first presented the concept at the 2011 Paris Air Show (Le Bourget) and showed a 3m long model.

Bernard Rousset participated in the Global Aerospace Summit of 2018 in Abu Dhabi and presented the latest advancement of the project.

The SonicStar was expected to reach speeds of up to Mach 3.6 (2,375 mph (3,822 km/h)) and fly at an altitude of 80,000 feet (24,380 m). Its propulsion was projected to be 30 percent more fuel efficient than the Rolls-Royce/Snecma Olympus 593 engines which powered the Concorde. Hypothetically, the SonicStar would fly three times faster than the speed of the Concorde. It was planned to be powered by two engineered 157,700 thrust SonicBlue HYSCRAM (Hypersonic Superconducting Combustion Ram Accelerated Magnetohydrodynamic Drive) hybrid hypersonic 6500-X series engines. Sonic boom was expected to be eliminated over land, through electromagnetic drag reduction technology that was claimed to be under development.

The proposed aircraft would carry 8 to 12 passengers in a high comfort VIP mode.

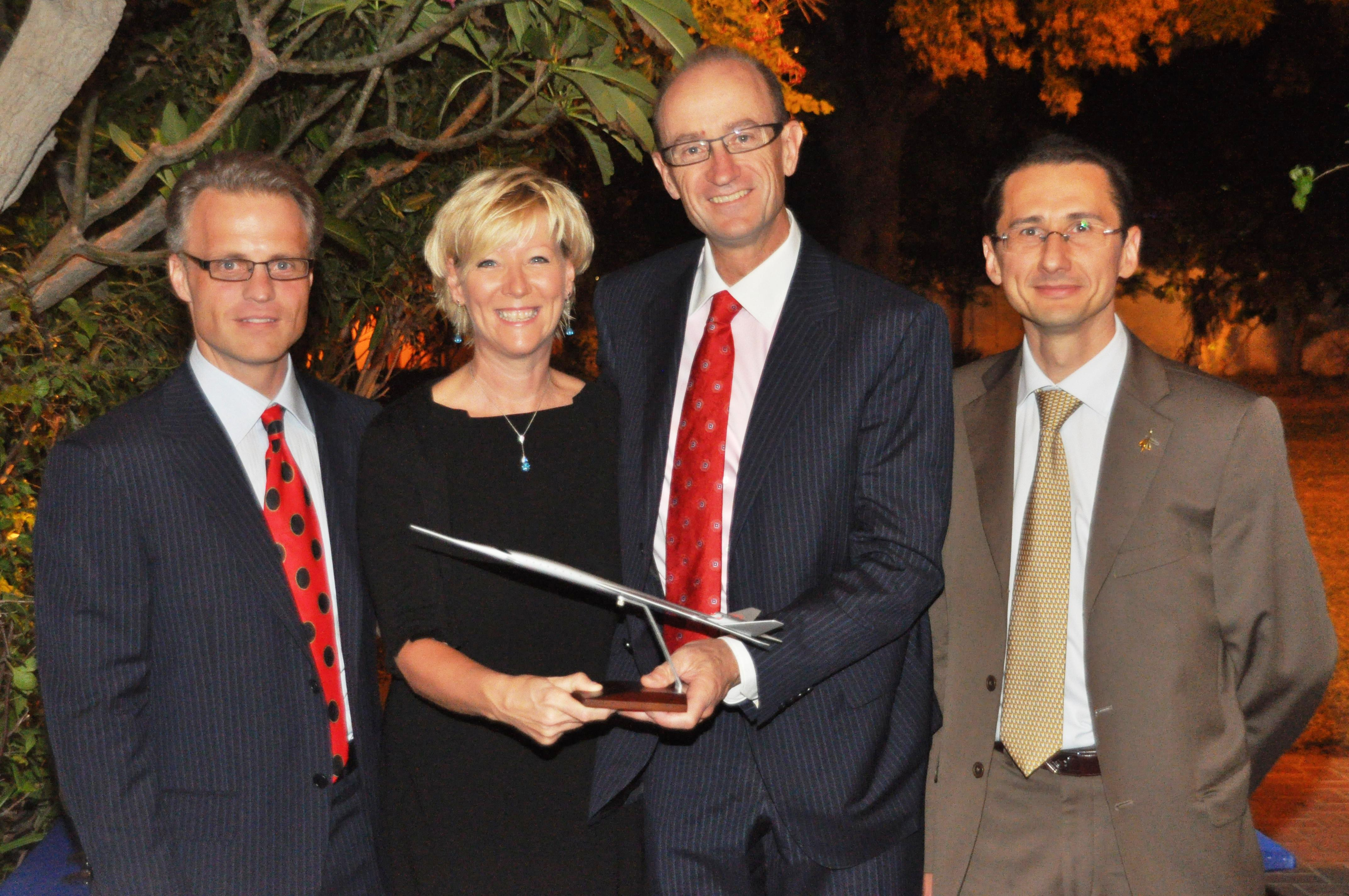
The core team in Dubaï in 2011

The founders put the project on hold by 2020, and went on their separate journeys. No further information regarding the aircraft has been published since 2019. Octuri provided some illustrations of the aircraft and the interiors, and La Depeche published an article in 2014. As of March 2025, the company's website no longer exists.

== See also ==
- Supercruise
- Zero Emission Hyper Sonic Transport
- SpaceLiner
- Orient Express X-30 follow-on
- Boeing Sonic Cruiser
- Concorde
- Aerion SBJ
- Boom Technology

== Bibliography ==
- Jones, Bryony (June 21, 2011), "Race to be first with 'son of supersonic'", CNN, archived from the original on January 4, 2014.
- Moscrop, Liz (June 21, 2011), "Paris 2 011: Hypersonic Hyperbole", Aviation International News.
- Quick, Darren (June 20, 2011), "HyperMach unveils SonicStar supersonic business jet concept", Gizmag.
