= SAI Quiet Supersonic Transport =

Type of aircraft

QSST
- Artist's impression of the QSST

General information
- Type: Supersonic business jet
- Manufacturer: Supersonic Aerospace International
- Designer: Lockheed Martin Skunk Works
- Status: Abandoned

The SAI Quiet Supersonic Transport (QSST) was a project by Supersonic Aerospace International (SAI) to develop a "virtually boomless" commercial supersonic business jet. The project was announced around the year 2000 and provided update announcements until 2010. After three years without any updates, the last update was in 2013. As of 2023, there have been no more updates, and the project appears to have been abandoned. The project has currently merged with NASA's X-59 Quesst project.

== Design and development ==
The Lockheed Martin Skunk Works began developing the QSST in May 2001 under a $25-million contract from SAI. Designed to cruise at an altitude of 60,000 feet (18,288 meters) at speeds of Mach 1.6 to 1.8 (approximately 1,218 to 1,370 statute miles per hour, or 1,920 to 2,204 kilometers per hour) with a range of 4,600 statute miles (approx. 7,402 km), the two-engine gull-wing aircraft was designed to create a sonic boom only 1% as strong as that generated by the Concorde.

SAI invited engine proposals from General Electric, Pratt & Whitney and Rolls-Royce. Each of the QSST's two engines must generate 33,000 pounds (approx. 14,968 kg) of thrust, comparable to the power of engines for midsize airliners. The price per aircraft was expected to be about $80 million. SAI had planned to select an engine once an international consortium to manufacture the jet was completed, achieve first flight in 2017, and begin customer deliveries by 2018.

The reduction in sonic-boom energy is achieved by increasing the ratio of length to wingspan, using canards, and ensuring that the individual pressure waves generated by each part of the aircraft structure reinforce each other less significantly, producing a light rumble on the ground without an objectionable sonic boom like conventional supersonic aircraft.

== Supersonic Aerospace International ==
Supersonic Aerospace International, LLC (SAI) was an American aerospace firm. The company was begun in 2001 by Michael Paulson, son of Gulfstream Aerospace founder Allen Paulson. It was working to build the QSST though there has been no news of the project since the company's website went dormant in 2010.

== See also ==
- Supersonic transport
- Supercruise
- Supersonic
- Lockheed Martin X-59 QueSST

Aircraft of comparable role, configuration, and era

- Tu-444
- Aerion AS2
- Sukhoi-Gulfstream S-21

Related lists

- List of airliners
