= Boeing Sonic Cruiser =

Concept high-subsonic jet airliner with delta wing-canard configuration

Sonic Cruiser
- Boeing Sonic Cruiser (based on 2001 patent)

General information
- Type: Jet airliner
- Manufacturer: Boeing Commercial Airplanes
- Status: Proposed design, canceled

History
- Introduction date: none; originally planned for 2006–2008

The Boeing Sonic Cruiser was a concept jet airliner with a delta wing–canard configuration. It was distinguished from conventional airliners by its delta wing and high-subsonic/transonic cruising speed of up to Mach 0.98. Boeing first proposed it in 2001, but airlines generally preferred lower operating costs over higher speed. Boeing ended the Sonic Cruiser project in December 2002 and shifted to the slower (Mach 0.85) but more fuel-efficient 7E7 (later named 787 Dreamliner) airliner.

== Design and development ==
As well as wanting more direct flights, passengers have demonstrated a preference for flights that take less time and aeroplane configurations that enhance comfort. It’s just common sense: people want to go where they want to go, when they want to go, how they want to go. Boeing’s answer to the demand for faster flights, more direct flights and increased comfort is the Sonic Cruiser.

— Peter Rumsey, Director of New Airplane Product Development, Ingenia, February 2002

The Sonic Cruiser was born from one of numerous outline research and development projects that began in the 1990s at Boeing with the goal to look at potential designs for a possible new near-sonic or supersonic airliner. The Sonic Cruiser was publicly unveiled on March 29, 2001. Boeing had recently withdrawn its proposed 747X derivative from competition with the Airbus A380 when not enough airline interest was forthcoming, and instead proposed the Sonic Cruiser as a completely different approach. Instead of the A380's massive capacity, requiring a hub and spoke model of operation, the Sonic Cruiser was designed for rapid point-to-point connections for 200 to 250 passengers. Critics stated that Boeing had timed its announcement in an attempt to distract from the launch of the A380.

Boeing's 2001 patent detailed the breadth of delta wing-canard concepts studied, which included a supersonic variant with four engines capable of cruising at Mach 1.5 to 3.0, various tail, engine location, and inlet and outlet configurations, smaller supersonic and subsonic business jets, and what Boeing called a "modular" system, where the cruise speed could be changed from supersonic to near-sonic by an interchangeable nose; the "Sonic Cruiser" was a near-sonic variant. The origin has been traced back to 1995, with the formation of an internal Airplane Creation Process Strategy team, which had designed a plane code-named Project Glacier that strongly resembled the initial Sonic Cruiser drawings by fall 2000. In early 2001, Boeing CEO Alan Mulally began privately publicizing the concept to potential customers, touting its improved speed at an efficiency similar to existing designs.

Don Carty (American Airlines) and Sir Richard Branson (Virgin Atlantic) were openly enthusiastic for the Sonic Cruiser, and Branson expected to make a tentative order of three to six aircraft in May 2001. The March 29, 2001 announcement was followed by a larger media event at the Paris Air Show on June 19, where futurist John Naisbitt and Mulally praised the concept, unveiled as a 1/40-scale model. Popular Science named the Sonic Cruiser to its list of the Best of What's New in 2001.

=== Configurations ===
The Sonic Cruiser is a brand-new class of flying machine. Every other commercial jet airplane has been a further refinement of the 707.

— Walt Gillette, general manager of the Sonic Cruiser program, Boeing Frontiers, July 2002

Boeing continued to tweak the design through the summer 2001. Initial sketches released to the public were highly conjectural. A patent drawing filed by Boeing in early 2001 put the baseline aircraft's dimensions at approximately 250 feet (76 m) in length, with a wingspan of 164.9 feet (50.3 m). With a delta wing and canards arrangement, and flying just short of the speed of sound at Mach 0.95–0.98 (about 650 mph (1,050 km/h) at altitude), the Sonic Cruiser promised 15–20% faster speed than conventional airliners without the noise pollution caused by the sonic boom from supersonic travel. As an example, a flight using the Sonic Cruiser from London to Singapore was expected to be two hours shorter than one using a conventional airliner. In addition, the landing and takeoff noise was expected to meet Stage 4 requirements. The aircraft was designed to fly at altitudes in excess of 40,000 ft (12,000 m) to avoid existing air traffic, with a range of 6,000–10,000 nautical miles (6,900–11,500 miles; 11,000–19,000 km). Boeing estimated the Sonic Cruiser's fuel efficiency would be comparable to best performing twin-engine wide body airliners in 2002 on a per-passenger basis.

Boeing intended to use advanced composite and titanium materials to reduce weight and further improve fuel efficiency. In order to successfully build a commercial airplane with such a high advanced materials content (projected to be 60–70% of the airframe by weight), Boeing lined up a consortium of international partners with experience in aerostructures. By the end of 2001, those materials were being applied to an aircraft in Project Yellowstone, a competing project using more conventional airplane designs. That aircraft, being designed under Yellowstone as the replacement for the 757/767, was later announced as the 7E7, with "E" standing for "Efficient". As a baseline reference model using advanced materials, the proposed 7E7 would consume 10% less fuel than the Sonic Cruiser, and 17–20% less than the 767-300.

The design team at Boeing was finalizing the Sonic Cruiser configuration throughout 2002. Wind tunnel testing and computational fluid dynamics analysis were used to refine the Sonic Cruiser concept. Based on artwork released by Boeing in July 2002, the Sonic Cruiser now sported two taller vertical tails with no inward cant, and the forward canard was set at zero degrees dihedral. By that time, three different designs had been advanced: one was the original canard-delta wing design, and two were more conventional mid-fuselage wing designs in the interest of better compatibility with existing airport jetway equipment, although those two designs were unable to offer the same performance as the original configuration.

=== Cancellation and subsequent research ===
In the end, most airlines favored lower operating costs over a marginal increase in speed, and the project did not attract the interest for which Boeing had been hoping. In some cases, the increased speed would lead to operational complications; aircraft could arrive at airports prior to the end of the morning curfew. Demand for air travel fell dramatically after the September 11 attacks, and Boeing began publicizing Project Yellowstone to potential customers for the first time in February and March 2002. Branson, an early supporter of the Sonic Cruiser, was openly skeptical of the aircraft's prospects by July 2002: "Unless more runways are built the Sonic Cruiser is going to struggle because airlines will not have the slots to use the aircraft." None of the prospective operators prioritized improved aircraft speed in a meeting with Boeing held in October 2002.

The Sonic Cruiser project was finally abandoned by December 2002 in favor of the slower but more fuel-efficient Project Yellowstone/7E7 (later renamed Boeing 787 Dreamliner). Much of the research from the Sonic Cruiser was applied to the 787, including carbon fiber reinforced plastic for the fuselage and wings, bleedless engines, cockpit and avionics design.

In 2010, Boeing published a paper detailing several concepts for a supersonic airliner with reduced passenger count, derived from its work with the Sonic Cruiser and earlier NASA work on a High Speed Civil Transport (HSCT) concept. The concepts, developed under a NASA grant, included the 765-072B (approximately 100 passengers with a cruise at Mach 1.6–1.8), a smaller 765-076E business jet (30 passengers, Mach 1.6), and a larger 765-107B, nicknamed 'Icon-II' (120 passengers, Mach 1.8). All of the concepts had a range less than 6,000 nmi (6,900 miles; 11,000 km).

On April 16, 2012, Boeing published an application for a patent for an aircraft configuration similar to that of the Sonic Cruiser; the patent was granted in 2014.

== See also ==
- Boeing 2707, a proposed earlier generation Boeing supersonic transport (SST) which was a response to earlier SSTs.
- Convair 990, an airliner from an earlier generation designed for a small but fast market segment which failed to materialize
- North American X-10, an unmanned technology demonstrator that pioneered the canard/delta-wing configuration
- Boeing X-48, an experimental unmanned aerial vehicle (UAV) built to investigate the characteristics of blended wing body (BWB) aircraft.

Related development

- Boeing 787 Dreamliner
