= Sukhoi-Gulfstream S-21 =

Proposed supersonic business jet

S-21
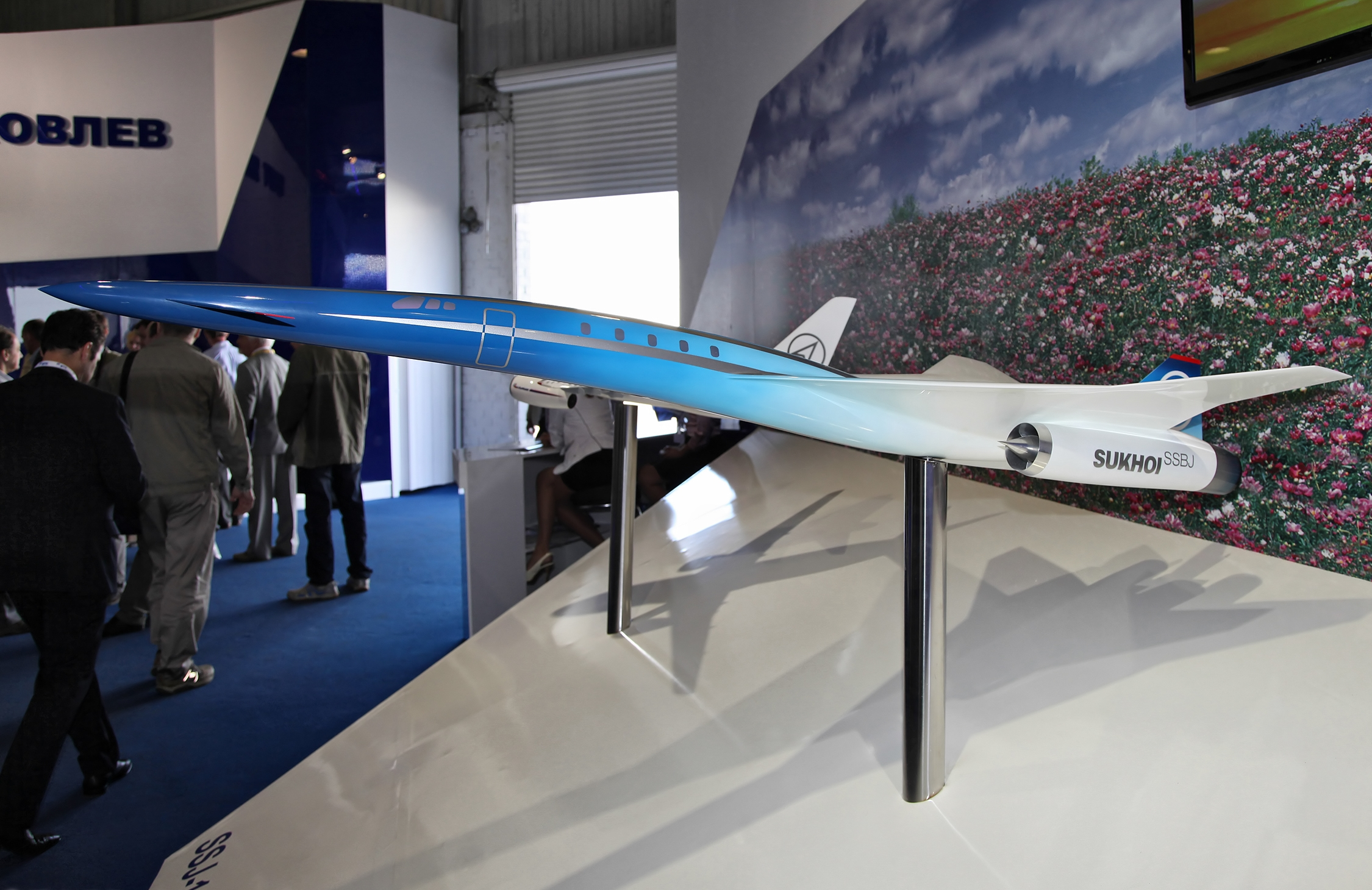
- Sukhoi SSBJ project model

General information
- Type: Supersonic business jet
- Manufacturer: Sukhoi Design Bureau/Gulfstream Aerospace

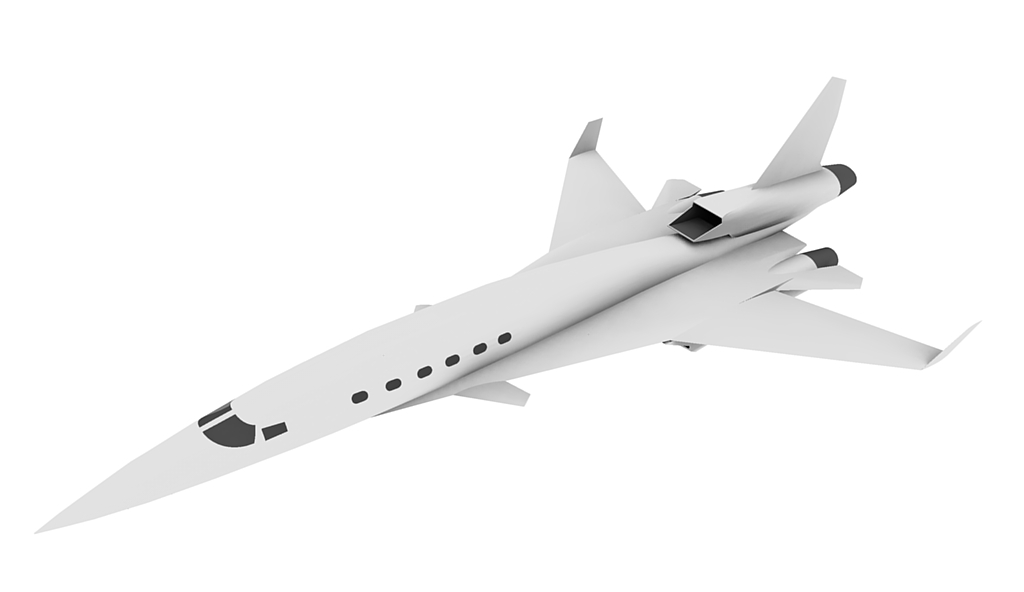
S-21 3D model

Sukhoi-Gulfstream S-21 was a projected Russian-American supersonic business jet.

In the early 1990s, Gulfstream Aerospace and the Sukhoi Design Bureau began a joint effort to develop a supersonic small business jet, code named the S-21. Due to questionable market demand for commercial supersonic air travel, commitment to the project weakened and delays mounted.

Gulfstream eventually dissolved the partnership, although Sukhoi continued work on the S-21.

The S-21 would be capable of sustained cruise at Mach 2+ and much research and development has gone into the management of the troublesome transonic effects phenomena associated with near Mach 1 air speeds.

As of 2012, the project had not received any funding for the 2013-2025 development period and appeared to be cancelled.

== Specifications (S-21) ==
General characteristics

- Crew: 2
- Capacity: 6–10 passengers and 2,999 lb (907 kg) useful load
- Length: 124 ft 2 in (37.86 m)
- Wingspan: 65 ft 5 in (19.93 m)
- Wingsweep: 32° unswept 68° swept
- Height: 27 ft 1 in (8.26 m)
- Empty weight: 54,167 lb (24,570 kg)
- Max takeoff weight: 114,200 lb (51,800 kg)
  - With Fuel: 58,465 lb (26,519 kg)
- Powerplant: 3 × Aviadvigatel D-21A1 turbofan, 16,535 lbf (73.55 kN) thrust each

Performance

- Maximum speed: Mach 2+
- Range: 4,600 mi (7,403 km, 4,000 nmi) at Mach 0.95
- Range: 2,715 mi (4,369 km, 2360 nmi) at Mach 1.4
- Service ceiling: 63,900 ft (19,477 m)
- Thrust/weight: 0.43

== See also ==
- Business jet
- Hypersonic transport
- Supersonic business jet
- Supersonic transport

Aircraft of comparable role, configuration, and era

- Aerion SBJ
- QSST
- Quiet Spike
- Tupolev Tu-444

Related lists

- List of civil aircraft
