= Rolls-Royce/Snecma Olympus 593 =

1960s British/French turbojet aircraft engine

Olympus 593
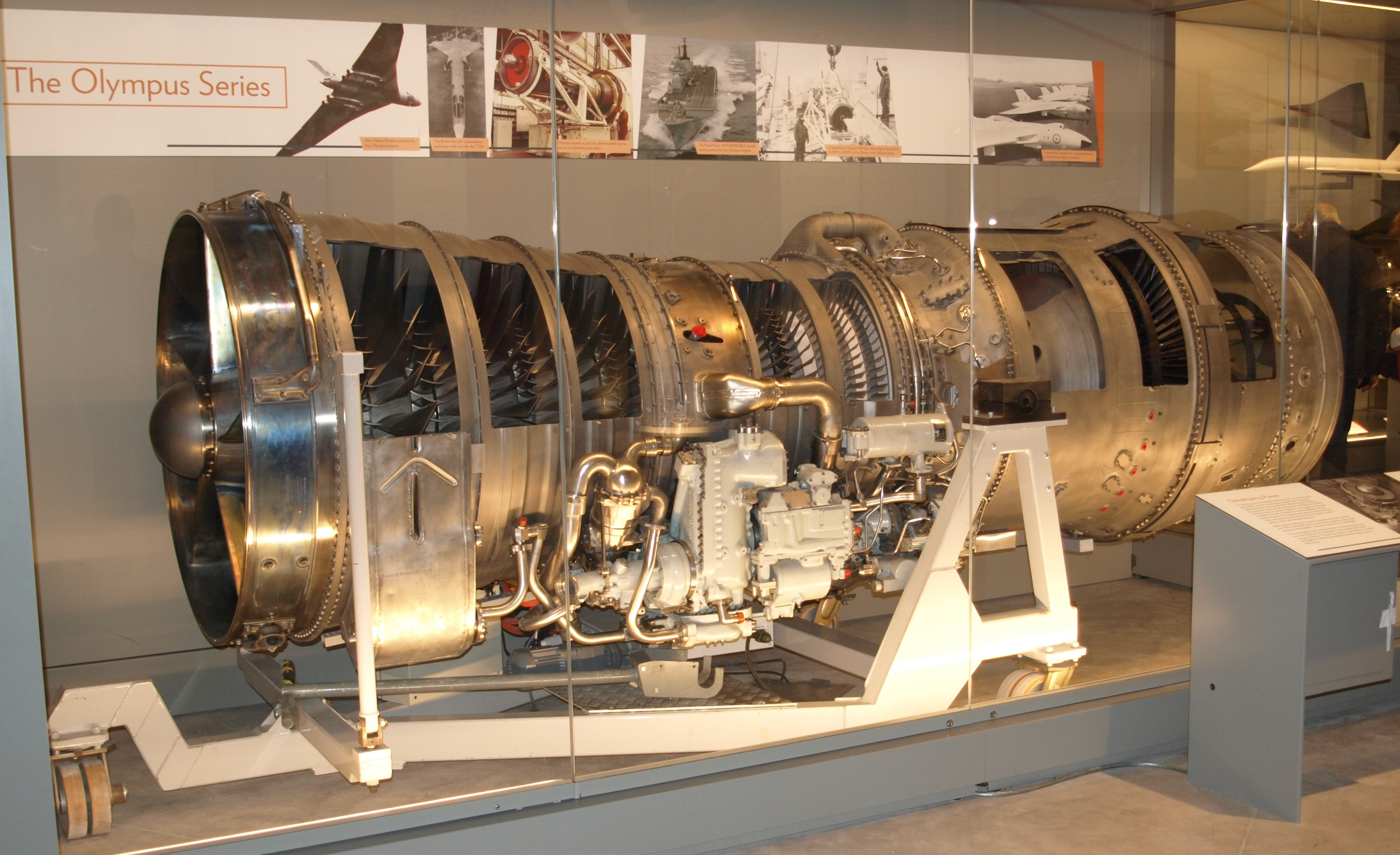
- On display at the Aerospace Bristol museum
- Type: Turbojet
- National origin: United Kingdom/France
- Manufacturer: Rolls-Royce Limited/Snecma
- First run: June 1966
- Major applications: Concorde
- Developed from: Rolls-Royce Olympus

The Rolls-Royce/Snecma Olympus 593 was an Anglo-French turbojet with reheat, which powered the supersonic airliner Concorde. It was initially a joint project between Bristol Siddeley Engines Limited (BSEL) and Snecma, derived from the Bristol Siddeley Olympus 22R engine. Rolls-Royce Limited acquired BSEL in 1966 during development of the engine, making BSEL the Bristol Engine Division of Rolls-Royce.

Until regular commercial flights by Concorde ceased in October 2003, the Olympus turbojet was unique in aviation as the only turbojet with reheat powering a commercial aircraft.

The overall efficiency of the engine in supersonic cruising flight (supercruise) was about 43%, which at the time was the highest figure recorded for any normal thermodynamic machine.

== Development ==
The initial design of the engine was a civil version of the Olympus 22R, redesignated as the 591. The 22R had been designed for sustained (45 minutes) flight at Mach 2.2 as the engine for the BAC TSR-2. The 591 was redesigned, being known as the 593, with specification finalised on 1 January 1964. Bristol Siddeley of the UK and Snecma Moteurs of France were to share the project. SNECMA and Bristol Siddeley were also involved in an unrelated joint project, the M45H turbofan.

The early development stages validated the basic design concept, but many studies were required to meet the specifications which included thrust-specific fuel consumption (TSFC or simply SFC), engine pressure ratio, size and weight, and turbine entry temperature.

Initial studies looked at turbojets and turbofans, but the lower frontal cross-sectional area of turbojets in the end was shown to be a critical factor in achieving superior performance. The competing Russian Tu-144 initially used a turbofan with reheat, but changed to a turbojet without reheat with considerable improvement in performance.

Development of the engine and engine accessories was the responsibility of Bristol Siddeley; BAC was responsible for the variable intake and overall engine installation, with Snecma taking on the exhaust nozzle incorporating the thrust reverser, noise attenuation, and reheat. Britain was to have a larger share in production of the Olympus 593 based powerplant as France had a larger share in fuselage production. Ground test running of the engines was co-ordinated between Bristol Siddeley, Patchway; the National Gas Turbine Establishment (NGTE), Pystock, UK; and the Centre d'Essais des Propulseurs (CEPr) at Saclay, France.

Increases in aircraft weight during the design phase led to a take-off thrust requirement which could not be met by the engine. The required shortfall of 20% was met with the introduction of partial reheat which was produced by SNECMA.

In July 1964, two prototypes of the 593D engine ("D" for "Derivative", i.e., derived from the 22R) were produced. These two derivative engines were built to determine the validity of design concepts such as turbine stator and rotor cooling and testing the system at high environmental temperatures. They also demonstrated the need for larger engines, which were designated 593B.

The Olympus 593B was first run in November 1965. The B (for "Big") was a redesign of the 593D which was planned for an earlier smaller Concorde design. Test results from the 593D were used for the design of the B. The B was dropped later from the designation. Snecma used an Olympus 301 in testing scaled models of the nozzle system.

In June 1966, a complete Olympus 593 engine and variable geometry exhaust assembly was first run at Melun-Villaroche. At Bristol, flight tests began using a RAF Avro Vulcan bomber with the engine and its nacelle attached below the bomb-bay. Due to the Vulcan's aerodynamic limitations, the tests were limited to a speed of Mach 0.98 (1,200 km/h). During these tests, the 593 achieved 35,190 lbf (157 kN) thrust, which exceeded the specification for the engine.

In early 1966, the Olympus 593 produced 37,000 lbf (160 kN) of thrust with reheat.

In April 1967, the Olympus 593 ran for the first time in a high altitude chamber, at Saclay. In January 1968, the Vulcan flying test bed logged 100 flight hours, and the variable geometry exhaust assembly for the Olympus 593 engine was cleared at Melun-Villaroche for flight in the Concorde prototypes.

Concorde prototype 001 made its maiden flight from Toulouse on 2 March 1969. It was captained by André Turcat, chief test pilot of Sud Aviation. Using reheat it lifted off at 205 knots (380 km/h) after a ground run of 4,700 feet (1.4 km).

A quieter, higher thrust version, the Mk 622, was proposed. Reheat was not required and the lower jet velocity reduced the noise from the exhaust. The improved efficiency would have allowed greater range and opened up new routes, particularly across the Pacific as well as transcontinental routes across America. However, the poor sales of Concorde meant that this plan for a Concorde 'B' was not pursued.

== Propulsion system design ==
=== Engine ===
The Olympus 593 was a two-shaft turbojet with reheat. The low pressure (LP) and high pressure (HP) compressors both had seven stages and were each driven by a single-stage turbine. Due to the high inlet air temperatures at Mach 2 cruise - in excess of 120 °C (393 K; 248 °F) - the compressor drums and blades were made from titanium except for the last four HP stages, which were Nimonic 90 nickel alloy. Nickel alloys were normally only required in the hotter turbine areas, but the high temperatures that occur in the last stages of the compressor at supersonic flight speeds dictated its use in the compressor also. The HP turbine stator and rotor blades and LP turbine rotor blades were cooled.

Partial reheat providing a 20% thrust increase was installed to give the take-off thrust required for Concorde to operate from existing runways, and for transonic acceleration from Mach 0.95 up to Mach 1.7; the aircraft flew supersonically without reheat above that speed. At cruise the engine's direct contribution (transferred by its mounts to the airframe) to forward thrust was 8% of propulsion system thrust. Its indirect contribution came from inducing air through the intake and pumping it (primary and secondary air) through the airframe nozzle: 63% derived from forward pressure against structures inside the air intake system, and 28% from forward pressure against the exhaust nozzles.

All major components of the Olympus 593 were designed for a life of 25,000 hours, with the exception of the compressor and turbine blades, which were designed for a 10,000-hour life. An engine installed on Concorde could be changed in 1 hour 50 minutes.

Engine

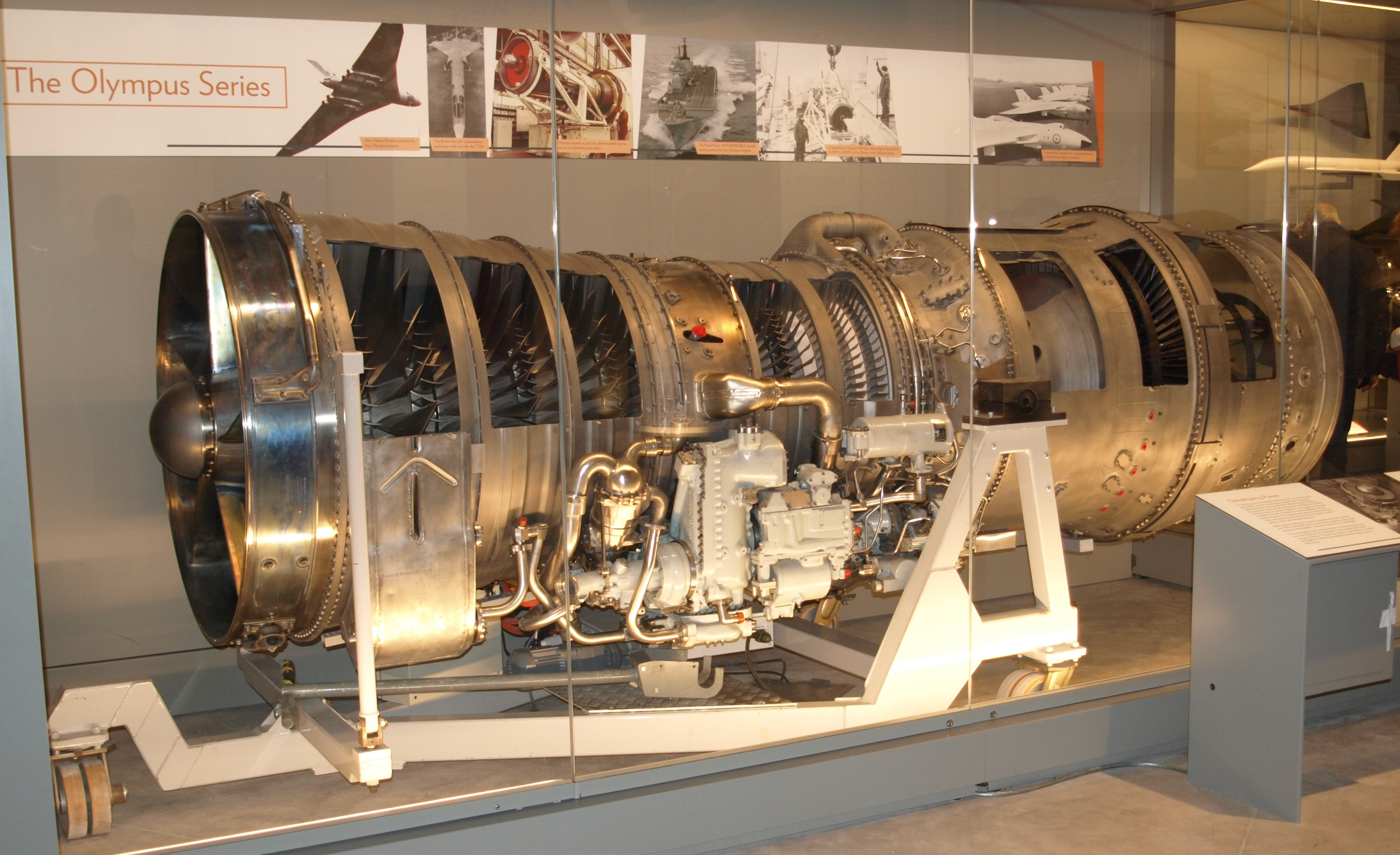
Cutaway Olympus 593 showing LP compressor, HP compressor, combustor, turbines and reheat fuel ring and flame holder.

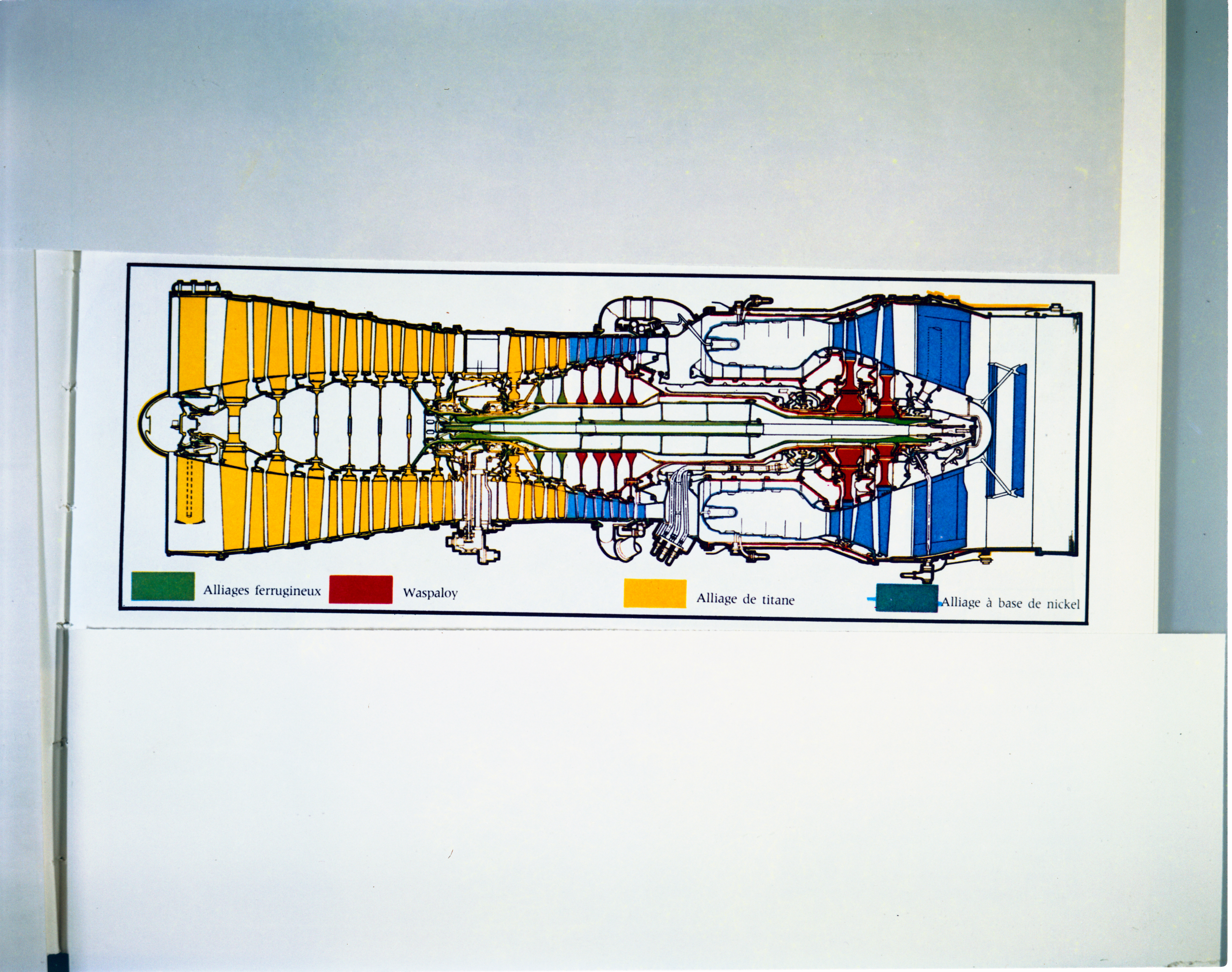
Olympus 593 drawing showing two shafts and reheat. Materials required for high intake temperatures at cruise are: Green- steel alloys, Red - Waspaloy, Yellow - titanium alloys, Blue - nickel-based alloys. Partial reheat only required a single fuel ring and flame stabiliser as shown.

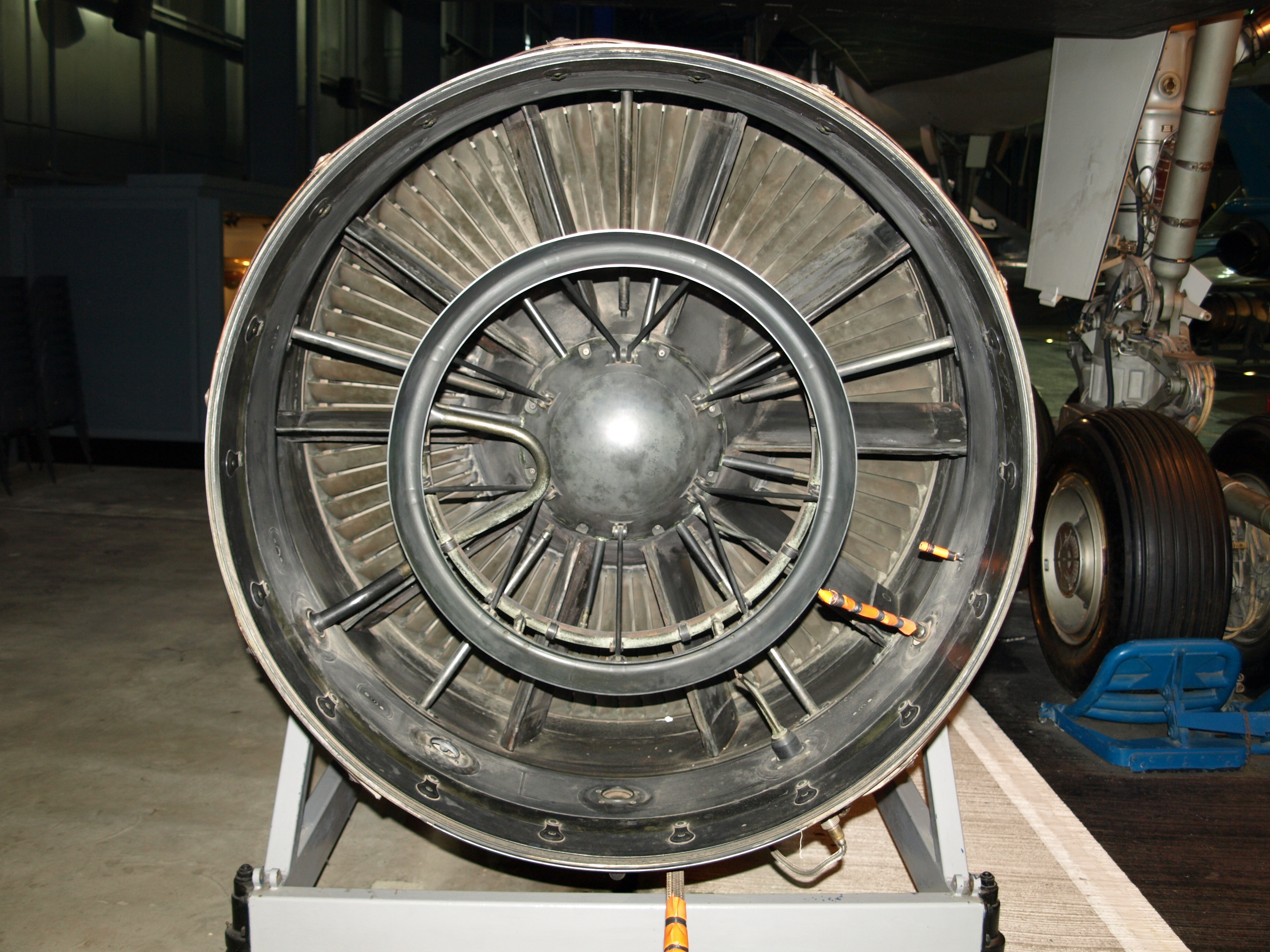
Olympus 593 view of partial reheat (20% thrust boost) showing lower fuelling requirement/temperature, needing only a single ring, compared to a military full reheat.

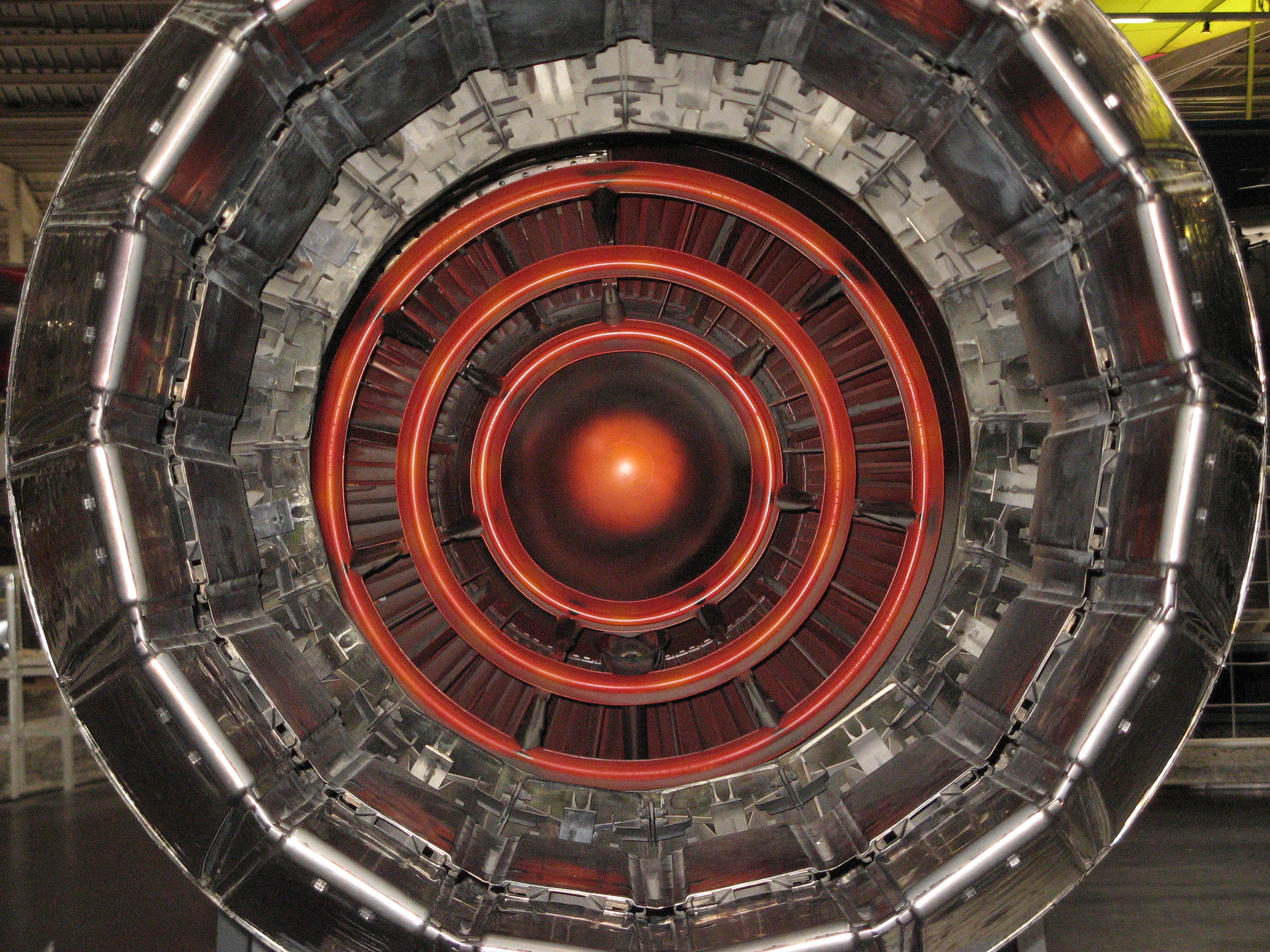
For comparison with the 593, a military full reheat requirement (50% thrust boost/3,000 degF) needing three fuelling rings (hidden by red flameholders) for flame across the whole duct (GE J79 turbojet engine).

=== Intake ===
Concorde intake system schematics

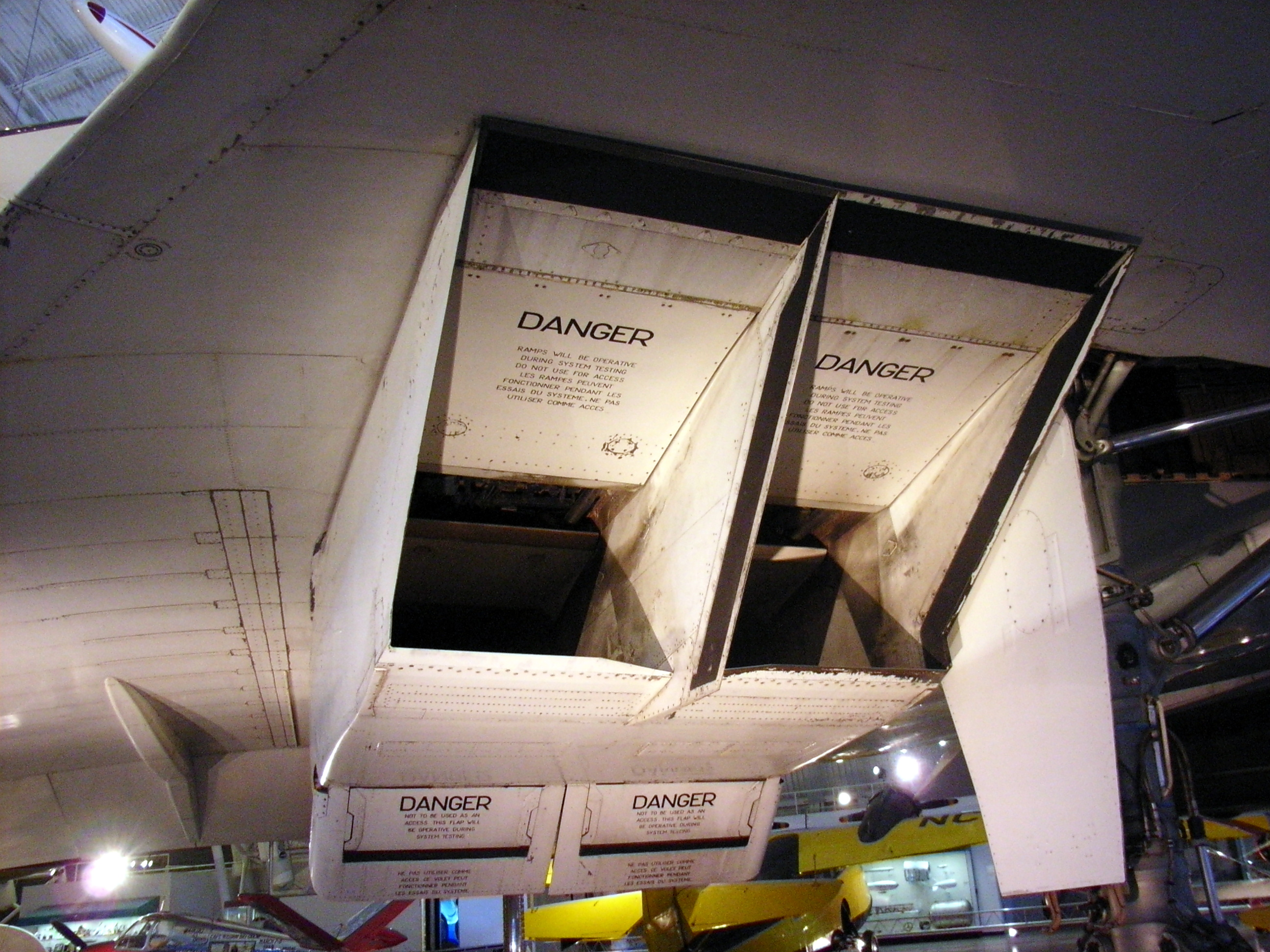
The initial converging section of the intake which produces drag. With the front ramps deflected down to the Mach 2 position, shown by the clean white area, decelerating supersonic flow was present through 3 shocks with increasing static pressure on the forward-facing surface to cause a rearward drag force

The Concorde's variable-geometry intake, designed by BAC, like any jet-engine intake, has to deliver the air to the engine at as high a pressure as possible (pressure recovery) and with a variation in pressure distribution (distortion) that can be tolerated by the compressor. Poor pressure recovery is an unacceptable loss for the intake compression process, and excessive distortion causes engine surging (from loss of surge margin). If the engine is a turbojet with reheat, the intake also has to supply cooling air for the hot reheat duct and engine nozzle. Meeting all the above requirements over the full range of the certified operating envelope was required for Concorde to become a viable commercial aircraft. They were met with a variable geometry intake and an intake-control system that compromised neither the operation of the engine nor the control of the aircraft.

Supersonic pressure recovery is addressed by the number of shock waves that are generated by the intake: the greater the number, the higher the pressure recovery. Supersonic flow is compressed or slowed by changes in direction. The Concorde intake front ramps changed the flow direction, causing oblique external shocks and isentropic compression in the supersonic flow. The TSR-2 had used a half-cone translating centre-body to change the direction. Subsonic pressure recovery is addressed by removal of the boundary layer (at the ramp bleed slot) and suitable shaping of the subsonic diffuser leading to the engine. The pressure recovery achieved by Concorde's engine intakes at Mach 2 cruise gave an intake pressure ratio of 7.3:1.

Shock waves gave rise to excessive boundary-layer growth on the front ramp. The boundary layer was removed through the ramp bleed slot and bypassed the subsonic diffuser and engine, where it would otherwise have caused excessive duct loss and unacceptable distortion at the engine. Since the ramp bleed slot was in the subsonic diffuser, and downstream of the shock system, changes in flow demanded by the engine would be accommodated with corresponding changes in the bleed slot flow without significantly affecting the external shock pattern. Engine flow reductions caused by throttling or shutting down were dealt with by dump-door opening.

The dump doors were closed at cruise to prevent loss in thrust, since air leaking from the duct does not contribute to the pressure recovery in the intake.

Since the intake area was optimal for cruise, an auxiliary inlet was provided to meet the higher engine air flow needed for take-off. Distortion of the flow at the engine face also had to be addressed, leading to an aerodynamic cascade with the auxiliary door.

Forces from the internal airflow on the intake structure are rearward (drag) on the initial converging section, where the supersonic deceleration takes place, and forward on the diverging duct where subsonic deceleration takes place up to the engine entry. The sum of the two forces gave a 63% thrust contribution at cruise from the intake part of the propulsion system.

In order to achieve the necessary accuracy in the control of the intake ramp and spill positioning, it was found necessary to use a digital signal processor in the Air Intake Control Units. This was developed in around 1972, relatively late in the programme, by the Electronics and Space Systems division of the British Aircraft Corporation at Filton. The Air Intake Control Units ensured the required fuel economy for transatlantic flights. The digital processor also accurately calculated the necessary engine speed scheduling to ensure an adequate surge margin under all engine and airframe operating conditions.

Concorde's Air Intake Control System also pioneered the use of digital data highways (multiplexed serial data buses) which connected the Air Intake Sensor Units that collected aerodynamic data at the nose of the aircraft (total pressure, static pressure, angle of attack and sideslip) and sent it to the Air Intake Control Units located nearer the air intakes, a distance of around 190 ft (58 m), using screened twisted pair cables to replace what would have been a much greater weight in aircraft wiring had only analogue signal wiring and pneumatic piping been used.

The intake control system had the unique ability to keep the powerplants operating correctly and to aid recovery whatever the pilots, the aircraft, and the atmosphere were doing in combination at the time.

The overall pressure ratio for the powerplant at Mach 2.0 cruise at 51,000 ft (15,500 m) was about 82:1, with 7.3:1 from the intake and 11.3:1 from the two engine compressors, far higher than any subsonic aircraft of the day, giving a correspondingly high overall efficiency of about 43%.

=== Secondary nozzle ===
The first part of the exhaust system is the engine nozzle with adjustable area to control the engine, and known as the primary nozzle. The engine exhaust and the nacelle secondary air from the intake pass into the airframe-mounted combined modulating secondary nozzle and thrust reverser. This nozzle, developed by SNECMA, consisted of two "eyelids" which varied their position in the exhaust flow dependent on the flight regime; for example, when fully closed (into the exhaust flow), they acted as thrust-reversers, aiding deceleration from landing to taxi speed. In the fully open cruise position, together with the engine nozzle, they formed an ejector nozzle to control the expansion of the exhaust. The eyelids formed the divergent passage while the engine exhaust ejected or pumped the secondary flow from the intake ramp bleed slot.

The expanding flow in the diverging section caused a forward thrust force on the exhaust nozzle: a 29% contribution to the overall propulsion system thrust at cruise.

During cruise at Mach 2.02 each Olympus 593 was producing around 10,000 lbf (44 kN) of thrust, equivalent to 36,000 hp (27,000 kW) per engine.

The primary exhaust nozzle and jet pipe were designed for a life of 30,000 hours; the Thrust Reverser Aft (TRA) structure for a life of 40,000 hours.

Nozzle

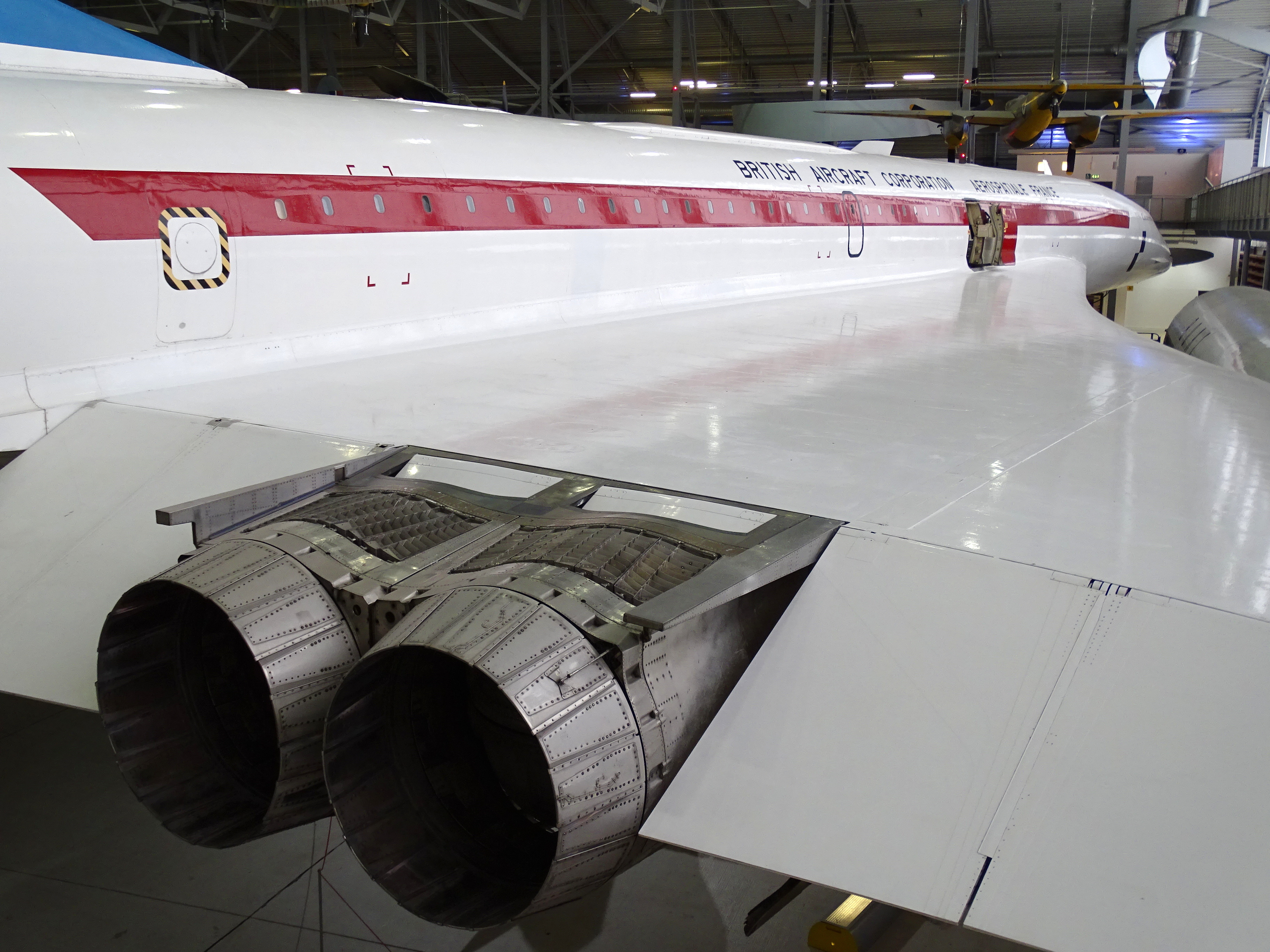
The pre-production Concorde G-AXDN, Duxford, close-up of nozzles and reverse-thrust, exit-air cascade vanes. On production aircraft, a revised design of "eyelid" variable nozzle/thrust reverser was used.

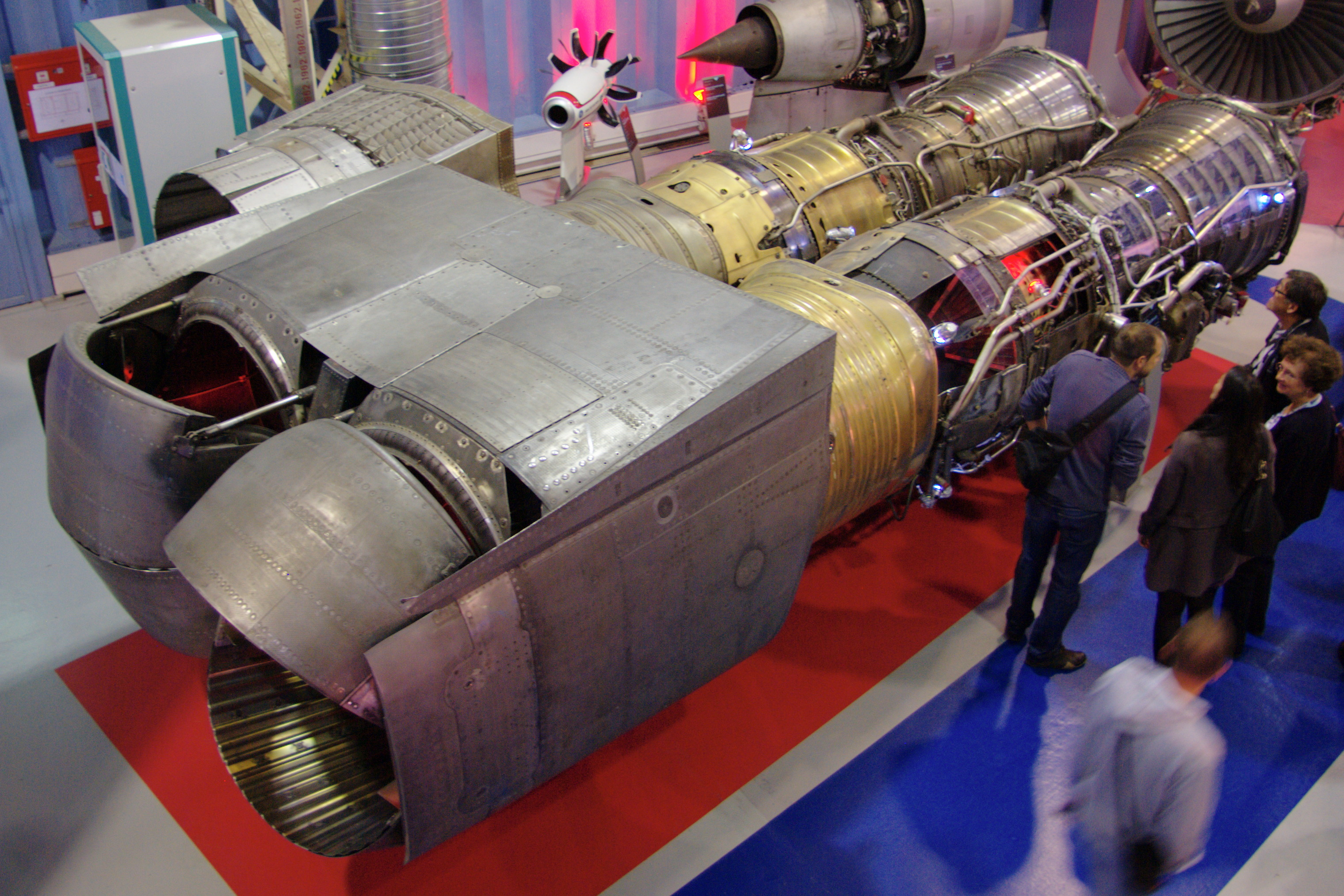
Engine and production nozzle arrangement under one Concorde wing. The monobloc nozzle assembly is installed behind two Olympus 593s. The nozzles are shown in different operating positions to illustrate take-off (right) and landing reverse thrust (left). They are partially closed for take-off to reduce sideline noise. They are fully closed to deflect the exhaust partially forward to produce reverse thrust.

Airframe secondary nozzle positions when A) taking off B) Mach 2 cruise C) thrust reversing.

== Variants ==
- 593 - Original version designed for Concorde
  - Thrust : 20,000 lbf (89 kN) dry / 30,610 lbf (136 kN) reheat
- 593-22R - Powerplant fitted to prototypes. Higher performance than original engine due to changes in aircraft specification.
  - Thrust : 34,650 lbf (154 kN) dry / 37,180 lbf (165 kN) reheat
- 593-610-14-28 - Final version fitted to production Concorde
  - Thrust : 32,000 lbf (142 kN) dry / 38,050 lbf (169 kN) reheat

== Engines on display ==
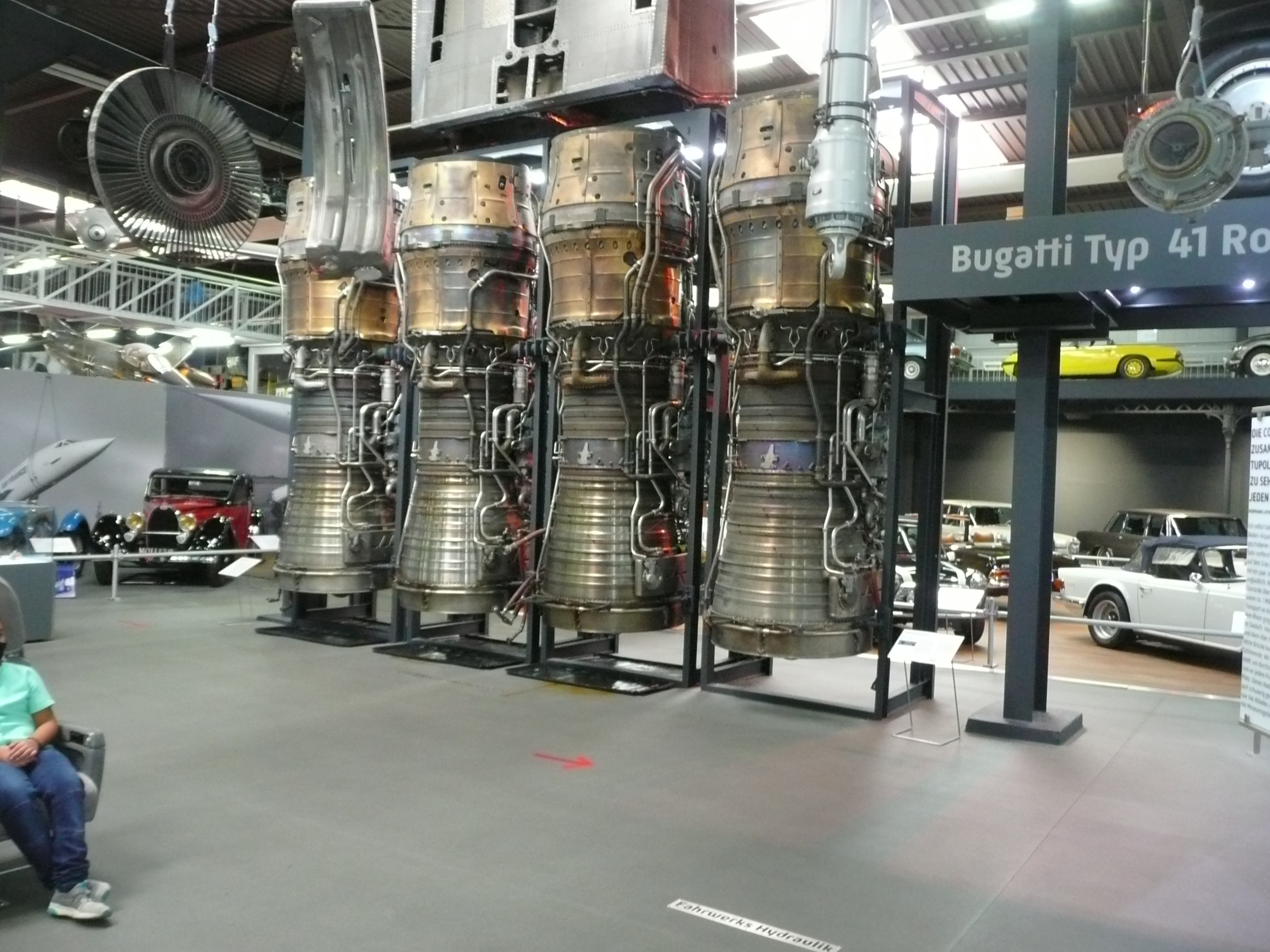
Rolls-Royce/Snecma Olympus 593 from Concorde F-BVFB in Sinsheim

Preserved examples of the Rolls-Royce/Snecma Olympus 593 are on display at the following museums:

- Aerospace Bristol, Bristol, UK
- Newark Air Museum, Newark, UK
- Technik Museum Sinsheim, Sinsheim, Germany

In addition to these museums, other sites that display examples of the Olympus 593 include:

- Talbot Laboratory at the University of Illinois at Urbana-Champaign, Illinois, US
- Weber Space Science and Technology Building at the Georgia Institute of Technology, Georgia, US
- Whittle building at the Cranfield University, Cranfield, UK
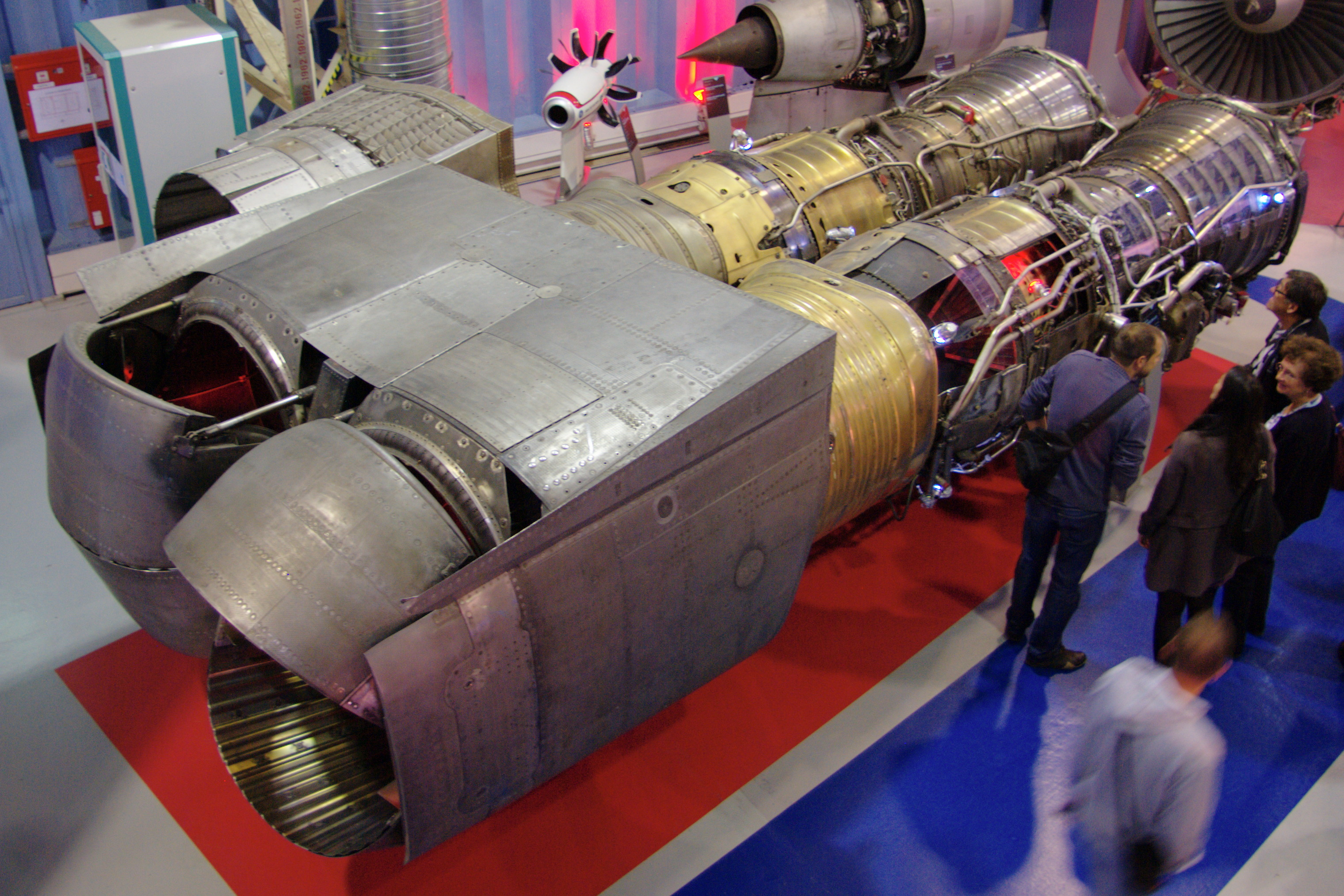
An engine pair with thrust reversers at the Musée aéronautique et spatial Safran

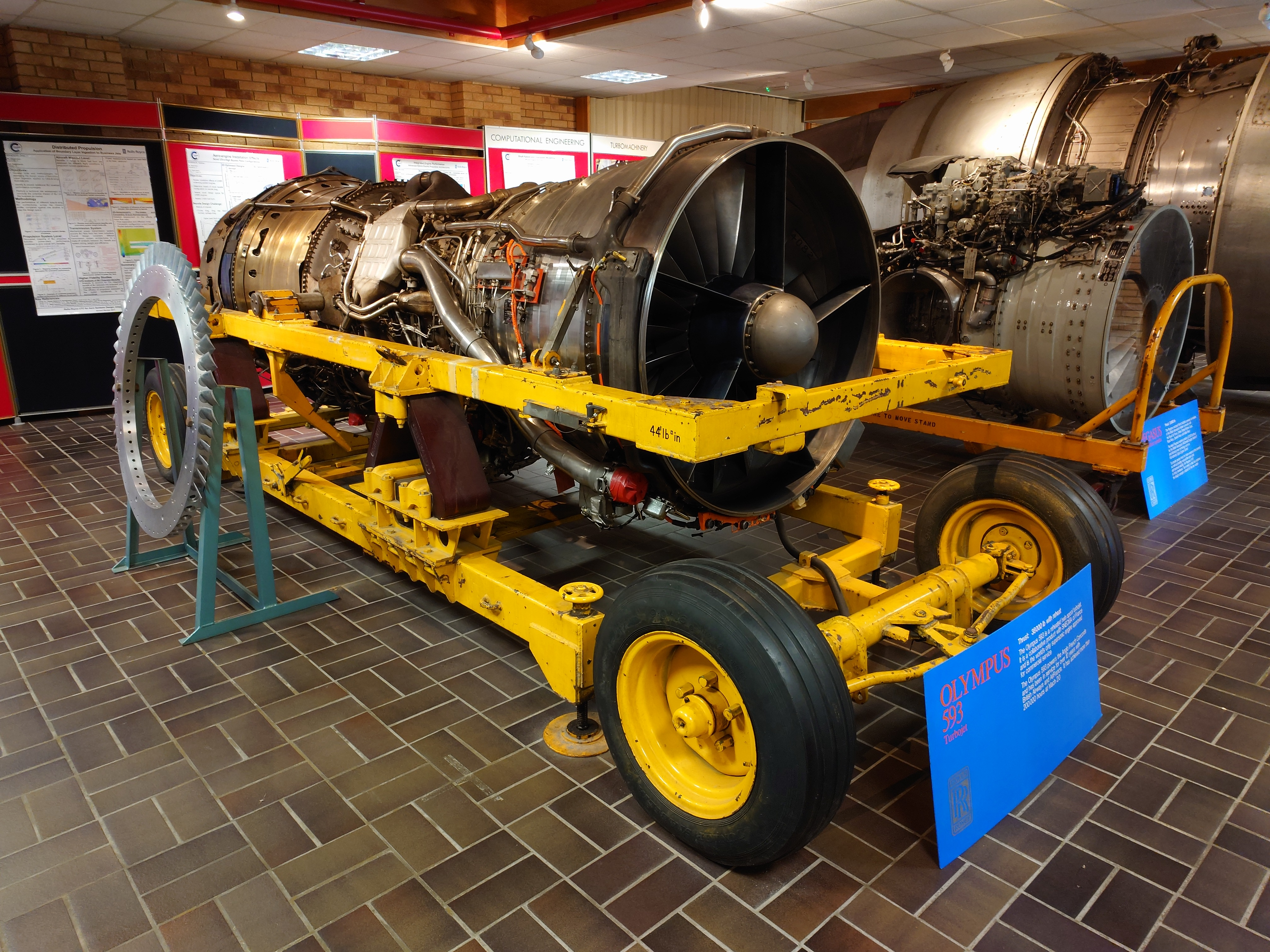
An engine on display at Cranfield University

== Specifications (Olympus 593 Mk 610) ==
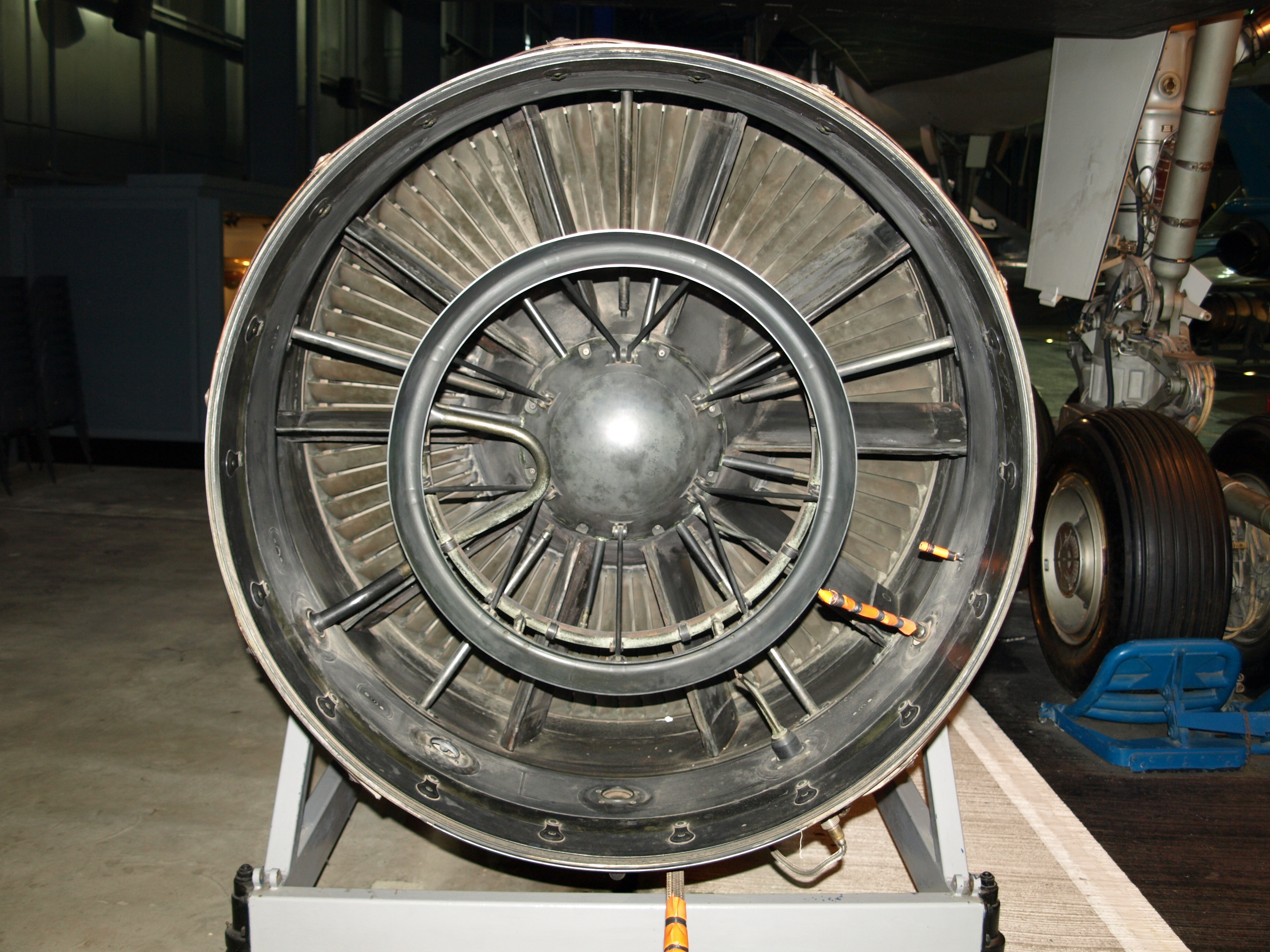
Turbine and reheat gutter section of an Olympus 593 on display at the Fleet Air Arm Museum

Data from Jane's.

==== General characteristics ====
- Type: turbojet
- Length: 4.039 m (13 ft 3.0 in)
- Diameter: 1.212 m (3 ft 11.7 in)
- Dry weight: 3,175 kg (7,000 lb)

==== Components ====
- Compressor: Axial-flow, 7-stage low-pressure, 7-stage high-pressure
- Combustors: Nickel alloy construction annular chamber, 16 vaporizing burners, each with twin outlets
- Turbine: Two stages: one high-pressure, one low-pressure
- Fuel type: Jet A1

==== Performance ====
- Maximum thrust: wet: 169.2 kN (38,000 lbf) dry: 139.4 kN (31,300 lbf)
- Overall pressure ratio: 15.5:1 (with aircraft stationary)
- Overall pressure ratio: about 82:1 at Mach 2.0 (includes pressure rise in intake, 7.3:1, and in engine, 11.3:1 which is less than when stationary due to ram temperature rise)
- Air mass flow: (186 kg (410 lb))/s)
- Specific fuel consumption: 1.195 lb/(lbf⋅h) (33.8 g/(kN⋅s)) cruise / 1.39 lb/(lbf⋅h) (39 g/(kN⋅s)) SL (sea level).
- Thrust-to-weight ratio: 5.4:1

== See also ==
Related development

- Rolls-Royce Olympus

Comparable engines

- Kolesov RD-36-51
- Kuznetsov NK-144
- Pratt & Whitney J58
- General Electric YJ93
- General Electric GE4

Related lists

- List of aircraft engines
