= General Electric GE4 =

Turbojet engine by General Electric

GE4
- The General Electric GE4/J5 afterburning turbojet
- Type: Turbojet
- National origin: United States
- Manufacturer: General Electric
- First run: 1967
- Major applications: Boeing 2707; Lockheed L-2000
- Manufactured: 1967 – 1972
- Number built: 3
- Developed from: General Electric YJ93

A mock-up of the GE4/J5 single-shaft afterburning turbojet

The General Electric GE4 turbojet engine was designed in the late 1960s as the powerplant for the Boeing 2707 supersonic transport. The GE4 was a nine-stage, single-shaft, axial-flow turbojet based largely on the General Electric YJ93 which powered the North American XB-70 bomber. The GE4 was the most powerful engine of its era, producing 50,000 lbf (220 kN) dry, and 65,000 lbf (290 kN) with afterburner. The Boeing 2707 was cancelled in 1971, putting an end to further work on the GE4.

== Specifications (GE4/J5P) ==
Data from Boeing, Flight International

==== General characteristics ====
- Type: Afterburning turbojet
- Length: 27ft 4 in (8,331mm)
- Diameter: 5ft 11 in (1,803mm)
- Dry weight: 11,300 lb (5,100 kg)

==== Components ====
- Compressor: Nine-stage axial
- Combustors: Annular straight-through-flow
- Turbine: Two-stage axial
- Fuel type: Special high-temperature JP-6 Fuel

==== Performance ====
- Maximum thrust: 50,000 lbf (220 kN) (63,200 lbf (281 kN) with afterburner)
- Overall pressure ratio: 12.5:1
- Turbine inlet temperature: 2,200 °F (1,204 °C)
- Thrust-to-weight ratio: 6.02
- Power-to-weight ratio: 6.07

=== Other Specifications ===
- Compressor inlet diameter: 60.6 in (1,539 mm)
- Exhaust nozzle diameter: 74.2 in (1,880 mm)
- Core airflow: 620 lb (280 kg) per second
- Noise:
  - Takeoff: 104 dB
  - Sideline: 117 dB
  - Approach: 107 dB

== See also ==
Related development

- General Electric J79
- General Electric YJ93

Comparable engines

- Kuznetsov NK-32
- Pratt & Whitney J58
- Rolls-Royce/Snecma Olympus 593

Related lists

- List of aircraft engines
