= Pratt & Whitney J58 =

High-speed jet engine by Pratt & Whitney

J58
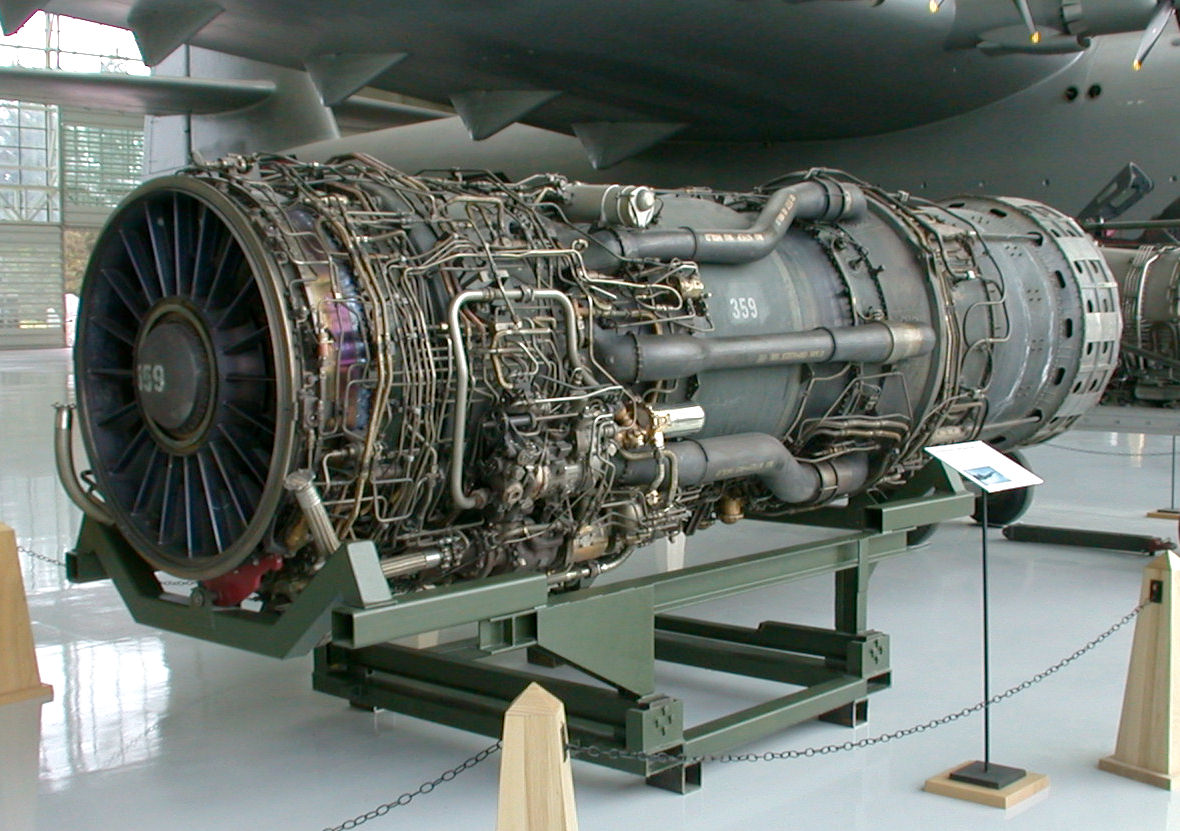
- J58 engine on display at the Evergreen Aviation & Space Museum
- Type: Turbojet
- National origin: United States
- Manufacturer: Pratt & Whitney
- First run: 1958
- Major applications: Lockheed A-12; Lockheed SR-71

The Pratt & Whitney J58 (company designation JT11D-20) is an American jet engine that powered the Lockheed A-12, and subsequently the YF-12 and the SR-71 aircraft. It was an afterburning turbojet engine with a unique compressor bleed to the afterburner that gave increased thrust at high speeds. Because of the wide speed range of the aircraft, the engine needed two modes of operation to take it from stationary on the ground to 3,200 km/h (2,000 mph) at altitude. It was a conventional afterburning turbojet for take-off and acceleration to Mach 2 and then used permanent compressor bleed to the afterburner above Mach 2. The way the engine worked at cruise led it to be described as "acting like a turboramjet". It has also been described as a turboramjet based on incorrect statements describing the turbomachinery as being completely bypassed.

The engine performance that met the mission requirements for the CIA and USAF over many years was later enhanced slightly for NASA experimental work (carrying external payloads on the top of the aircraft), which required more thrust to deal with higher aircraft drag.

== Development ==
=== Origins ===
The J58, company designation JT11, had its origins in the larger JT9 (J91) engine. It was a 3/4 scale JT9 with a mass flow of 140 kg/s (300 lb/s), down from 180 kg/s (400 lb/s). The JT11 was proposed to the US Navy under their designation J58. It was also proposed for various Navy and Air Force aircraft, e.g. Convair F-106, North American F-108, Convair B-58C, Vought XF8U-3 Crusader III, and North American A3J Vigilante, but none of these applications followed.

The J58 began development for the US Navy to power the planned Martin P6M jet flying boat. The P6M started out using Allison J71-A-4 engines and then switched to the Pratt & Whitney J75, due to J58 development delays. Upon cancellation of the P6M, it was selected for the Convair Kingfish and for the Lockheed A-12, YF-12A and SR-71. Other sources link its origin to the USAF's requirement for a powerplant for the WS-110A, the future XB-70 Valkyrie.

=== Re-design for Mach 3.2 ===
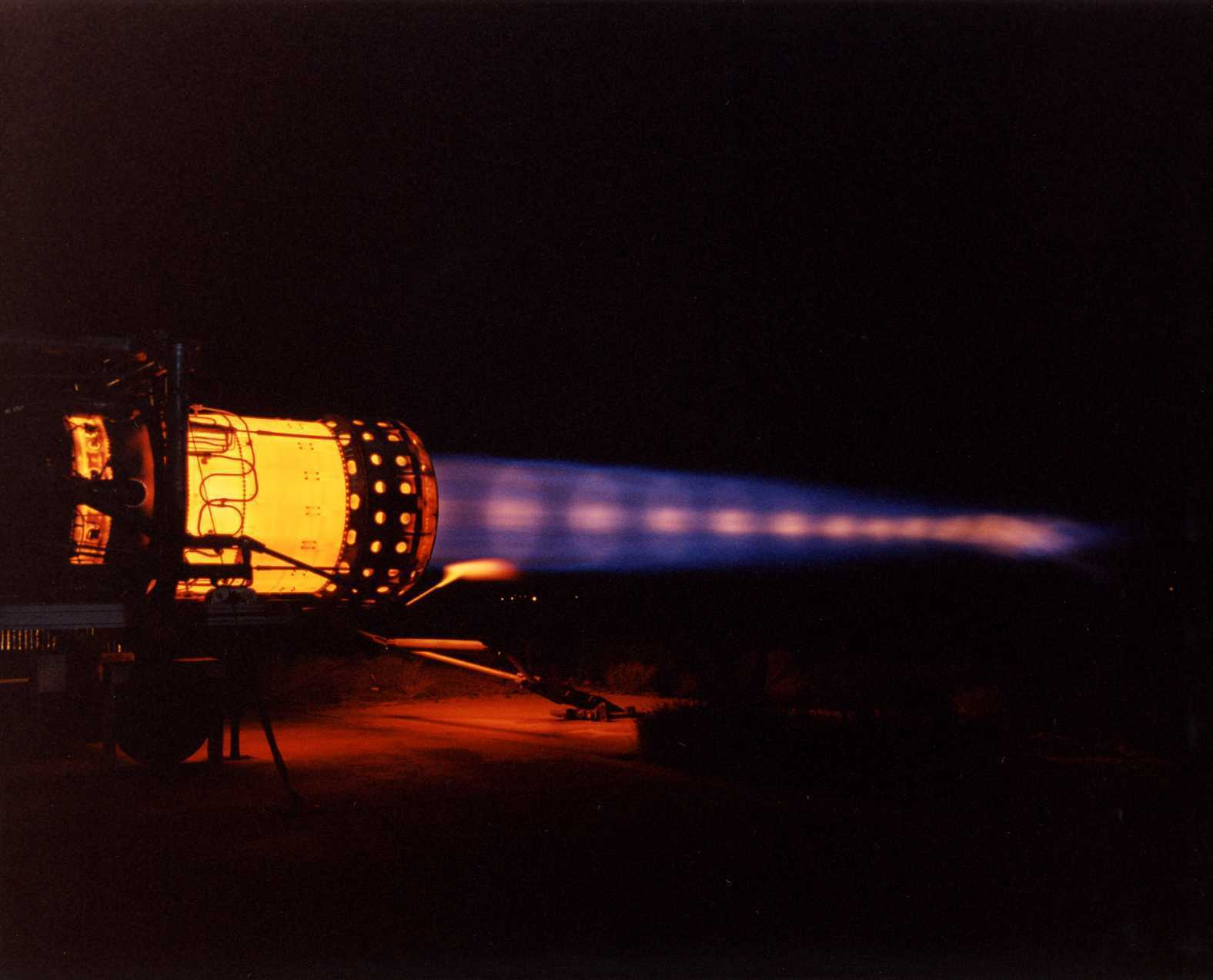
J58 on full afterburner, showing shock diamonds

Analytical calculations of the performance of the original J58 showed three problems at Mach 2.5: "exhaust pressure was equal to the inlet pressure, the compressor was deep in surge, and there was no cool air to the afterburner liner that would therefore melt".

The first problem was caused by excessive compressor delivery temperatures, which did not allow enough energy to be added in the engine combustor to provide any thrust from the gas generator. All the thrust-producing pressure in the jet-pipe came from ram, as with a ramjet, and none from the gas generator. Fuel for thrust could only be added in the afterburner, which became the only source of engine thrust. The speed at which the gas generator produced no thrust was raised from about Mach 2.5 to about Mach 3 by patented design changes. Beyond that speed, the gas generator would become a drag item with, at Mach 3.2, a pressure ratio of 0.9. Even minimum afterburner would not balance the drag. The effect was described qualitatively by Lockheed inlet designer David Campbell "..with minimum afterburner the engine would be dragging on the engine mounts at high Mach numbers."

The second problem (the compressor deep in surge) was caused by the compressor trying to operate at too-low a corrected speed in an area of its compressor map known as "off-design". The third problem was caused by the afterburner duct being cooled with too-hot turbine exhaust gas.

U.S. patent 3,344,606 describes the changes to the engine that extended the engine's capability to Mach 3.2. They included diverting 20% of the compressor entry air after the 4th compressor stage directly to the afterburner through six external tubes. This allowed the compressor to work properly with adequate surge margin and increased airflow into the compressor. Some of the increased flow left the compressor after the 4th stage as bypass to the afterburner, and some left the last compressor stage through the previously choked area. The increased airflow gave more thrust. The inlet guide vanes were modified with trailing-edge flaps to reduce blade flutter and prevent blade fatigue failures. The afterburner was cooled by the bleed air that was 400 °F (220 °C) cooler than the turbine exhaust gas. Not all the oxygen in the bleed air was available for combustion, as most of the bleed air was directed into the cooling shroud before entering the afterburner cavity for reheating. The improved afterburner cooling allowed a higher flame temperature, which gave more thrust.

The engine was completely redesigned, except for the compressor and turbine aerodynamic definitions, to run reliably for prolonged periods at unprecedented temperatures, not only inside the engine but also the surrounding casings where the controls, accessories, electrical wiring and fuel and oil tubes were located.

=== Starting ===
Two starting methods were used during the life of the A-12, YF-12 and SR-71 aircraft: an AG330 starter cart with two Buick V8 engines driving a common output shaft, or compressed air driving a small starter adapter. The air-start method superseded the cumbersome "Buicks" when better compressed air supplies became available.

=== Fuel ===
Any aircraft flying at three times the speed of sound is in a severe thermal environment, both from frictional heating and stagnation ram rise. The fuel was the only heat sink available to the aircraft and after absorbing 700 kW (40,000 Btu/min), keeping everything cool enough from the crew to the exhaust nozzle area indicator, it was supplied to the fuel nozzles at 316 °C (600 °F). To cope with these high temperatures, a new jet fuel called JP-7 with a low vapor pressure had to be developed. A chemical method for igniting the fuel, triethyl borane (TEB), was developed to match its low volatility. TEB spontaneously ignites in contact with air above −5 °C. The engine and afterburner were lit with TEB and the afterburner also had a catalytic igniter that glowed in the hot turbine exhaust. Each engine carried a nitrogen-pressurized sealed tank with 600 cm^{3} (21.1 imp fl oz; 20.3 US fl oz) of TEB, sufficient for at least 16 starts, restarts, or afterburner lights; this number was one of the limiting factors of SR-71 endurance, as after each air refueling the afterburners had to be reignited. When the pilot moved the throttle from cut-off to idle position, fuel flowed into the engine, and shortly afterwards an approx. 50 cm^{3} (1.8 imp fl oz; 1.7 US fl oz) shot of TEB was injected into the combustion chamber, where it spontaneously ignited and lit the fuel with a green flash. In some conditions, however, the TEB flow was obstructed by coking deposits on the injector nozzle, hindering restart attempts. Refilling the TEB tank was a perilous task; the maintenance crew wore silver fire suits. Conversely, the JP-7 fueling was so safe that some aircraft maintenance was permitted during filling. The chemical ignition was chosen instead of a conventional igniter for reliability reasons, and to reduce mechanical complexity. The TEB tank is cooled with fuel flowing around it, and contains a disk that ruptures in case of overpressure, allowing TEB and nitrogen to discharge into the afterburner.

One heat source required two-stage reduction. Before entering the fuel heat-sink system, the Environmental Control System (ECS) air leaving the engine compressor at 666 °C (1,230 °F) was so hot that ram air at 404 °C (760 °F) had to be used first. Fuel flowing from the tanks to the engines was used to cool the air conditioning systems, aircraft hydraulic fluid, engine oil, accessory drive system oil, the TEB tank and afterburner nozzle actuator control lines.

=== Materials ===
The development of the J58 involved some of the most challenging metallurgical development problems experienced by Pratt & Whitney Aircraft so far, with components operating at unprecedented temperatures and levels of stress and durability. New manufacturing techniques as well as new alloys improved the mechanical properties, and surface coatings had to be developed to protect components.

Premature cracking of turbine vanes and blades made from conventionally cast (i.e. equiaxed) Mar-M200, the strongest cast nickel-base alloy, was avoided by the development of directionally solidified parts cast in the same material. Directionally solidified Mar-M200 became the strongest cast turbine material to date and was introduced in production engines. Single-crystal turbine blades cast in Mar-M200, giving further improvement of high temperature resistance, would also be developed through testing in J58 engines. Waspaloy was the most widely used alloy in the engine, from critical high-energy rotating compressor discs to components made from sheet. Although used for turbine discs in other engines, it did not have the required properties for J58 turbine discs. Astroloy, the strongest known nickel-base superalloy in the Western world at that time, was used instead. Waspaloy was also used initially for the diffuser case, the part that joins the compressor to the combustor and that contains the highest pressure in the engine. Diffuser case weld cracking led to the introduction of Inconel 718 for this part. The afterburner liner was sprayed with ceramic thermal barrier coating that, together with the cooling air from the compressor, allowed continuous use of the afterburner with flame temperatures up to 3,200 °F (1,760 °C).

=== Performance enhancement for NASA ===
NASA was loaned 2 SR-71 aircraft for research work. One was modified to flight-test a Linear Aerospike rocket engine and was fitted with thrust-enhanced J58 engines. Engine thrust was increased by 5% to offset increased aircraft drag. The increased thrust came from a throttle push, or exhaust gas temperature uptrim, of 42 °C (75 °F). The increase was limited by the allowable reduction in life of the second-stage turbine blades (the life-limiting component) from 400 to 50 hours. The same thrust-enhancement studies used for this work also looked at an additional 5% thrust from additional afterburner fuel made possible with oxidizer injection (nitrous oxide). The nitrous oxide rate would have been limited by thermal choking of the nozzle.

=== Legacy ===
As of 2021, the J58 is the only known aircraft engine designed to operate continuously at maximum afterburning at high Mach number cruise. J58 experience was used extensively in the JTF17 engine proposal for a Mach 2.7 SST, due to significant flight time at Mach 2.7 and above. It was also used for subsequent engines developed by Pratt & Whitney, both commercial and military. The next afterburning engine, the TF30 as installed in the F-111, used an airframe-mounted secondary nozzle with free-floating flaps similar to that used on the SR-71.

J58 emissions were measured as part of the NASA Stratospheric Wake Experiment, which looked at the environmental impact of using afterburning jet engines for supersonic transports. An engine was tested in an altitude chamber at a maximum condition of full afterburning at Mach 3.0 and 19.8 km altitude.

== Design ==
=== Contemporary compressor solutions for Mach 3 flight ===
Alternative solutions to combat the adverse effects of high inlet temperature on the aerodynamic performance of the compressor were rejected by the Pratt & Whitney patentee, Robert Abernethy. One of those solutions was used in a contemporary installation. The GE YJ93/XB-70 used a variable-stator compressor to avoid front-stage stall and rear-stage choking.

Another possible solution, pre-compressor cooling, was used on the MiG-25's R-15 engines. Water/methanol was injected from a spray mast in front of the compressor to lower the intake temperature for short durations at maximum speed. Pre-compressor cooling was also proposed for a Mach 3 reconnaissance Phantom and the Mach 3+ F-106 RASCAL project.

=== Propulsion system ===
Operation of the air inlet and nozzle showing air flow through the nacelle

The propulsion system consisted of the intake, engine, nacelle or secondary airflow and ejector nozzle (propelling nozzle). The propulsive thrust distribution between these components changed with flight speed: at Mach 2.2 inlet 13% – engine 73% – ejector 14%; at Mach 3.0+ inlet 54% – engine 17.6% – ejector 28.4%.

==== Intake ====
The intake had to supply air to the engine with acceptable pressure loss and distortion. It had to do this in all flight conditions.

==== Nacelle airflow and ejector nozzle ====
The ejector, or secondary, nozzle performed the reverse function of the inlet accelerating the turbine exhaust from about Mach 1.0, as it left the primary nozzle, back up to Mach 3. Mach 3 exhaust velocity is higher than Mach 3 flight velocity due to the much-higher temperature in the exhaust. The nacelle airflow from the intake controlled the expansion of the hot engine exhaust in the ejector nozzle. This air flowed around the engine and served also to cool the hot external parts of the engine and to purge any combustible mixtures in the event of a fuel or oil leak in the nacelle.

== Variants ==
JT11-1
Proposed version with 26,000 lbs. thrust in afterburner; Mach 3 dash capability.
JT11-5A
Proposed version with 32,800 lbs. thrust in afterburner; Mach 3+ capability.
JT11-7
Proposed version with 32,800 lbs. thrust with afterburner; Mach 4 capability.
JT11D-20
(J58-P-4) Production version for the SR-71.

J58-P-2
proposed for a US Navy Mach 2.7 capable fleet defense interceptor, canceled mid-1959.
J58-P-4

== Applications ==
- Convair Model 58-9 (proposal)
- Convair B-58C Hustler (proposal)
- North American A3J Vigilante (proposal)
- Lockheed A-12
- Lockheed M-21
- Lockheed SR-71 Blackbird
- Lockheed YF-12

== Specifications (JT11D-20) ==
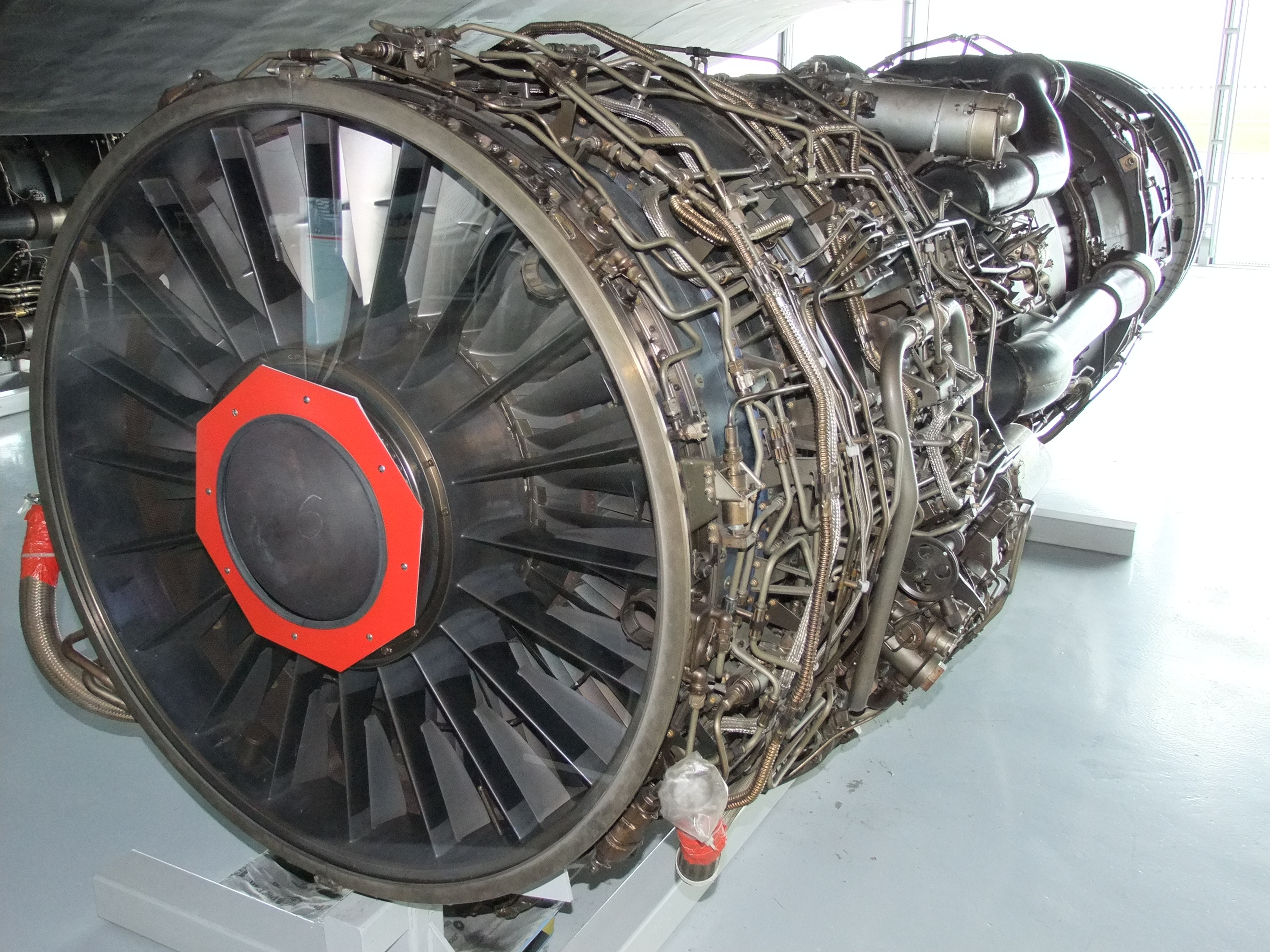
Front view of a J58 as displayed at the Imperial War Museum Duxford, Cambridgeshire, UK, alongside a Lockheed SR-71A Blackbird

Data from Aircraft engines of the World 1966/67, The Engines of Pratt & Whitney: A Technical History, Military Turbojet/Turbofan Specifications,

==== General characteristics ====
- Type: afterburning turbojet with compressor bleed bypass
- Length: 180 in (4,600 mm) (an additional 6 in (150 mm) at max. temp.)
- Diameter: 50 in (1,300 mm)
- Dry weight: approx. 6,000 lb (2,700 kg)

==== Components ====
- Compressor: 9-stage, axial flow
- Combustors: cannular 8 burner cans in an annular combustion casing
- Turbine: 2-stage axial flow
- Fuel type: JP-7, JP-4 or JP-5 for emergency refuelling from any tanker (Mach 1.5 limit)
- Oil system: pressure spray return system with fuel-cooled oil cooler

==== Performance ====
- Maximum thrust: on a standard day at sea level, zero airspeed: installed 25,500 pounds-force (113.43 kN) wet, 18,000 pounds-force (80.07 kN) dry. Uninstalled 34,000 pounds-force (151.24 kN) wet, 25,000 pounds-force (111.21 kN) dry
- Overall pressure ratio: 8.8 at take off
- Bypass ratio: zero up to Mach 2, rising to 0.25 to afterburner above Mach 3
- Air mass flow: 300 lb/s (8,200 kg/min) at take-off power
- Specific fuel consumption: 1.9 lb/(lbf⋅h) or 54 g/(kN⋅s)
- Thrust-to-weight ratio: 5.23

== See also ==
Comparable engines

- General Electric GE4
- General Electric YJ93
- Kuznetsov NK-32
- Orenda Iroquois
- Rolls-Royce/Snecma Olympus 593
- Tumansky R-15

Related lists

- List of aircraft engines

== Bibliography ==
- SR-71 Flight Manual (Issue E, Change 2 ed.). US: Department of Defense. July 31, 1989. pp. 1–58 – via SR-71 Online.
