= Propelling nozzle =

Nozzle that converts the internal energy of a working gas into propulsive force

A propelling nozzle or exhaust ejector is a nozzle that converts the internal energy of a working gas into propulsive force; it is the nozzle, which forms a jet, that separates a gas turbine, or gas generator, from a jet engine.

Propelling nozzles accelerate the available gas to subsonic, transonic, or supersonic velocities depending on the power setting of the engine, their internal shape and the pressures at entry to, and exit from, the nozzle. The internal shape may be convergent or convergent-divergent (C-D). C-D nozzles can accelerate the jet to supersonic velocities within the divergent section, whereas a convergent nozzle cannot accelerate the jet beyond sonic speed.

Propelling nozzles may have a fixed geometry, or they may have variable geometry to give different exit areas to control the operation of the engine when equipped with an afterburner or a reheat system. When afterburning engines are equipped with a C-D nozzle the throat area is variable. Nozzles for supersonic flight speeds, at which high nozzle pressure ratios are generated, also have variable area divergent sections. Turbofan engines may have an additional and separate propelling nozzle which further accelerates the bypass air.

Propelling nozzles also act as downstream restrictors, the consequences of which constitute an important aspect of engine design.

== Principles of operation ==
- A nozzle operates according to the Venturi effect to bring the exhaust gasses to ambient pressure, while forming them into a propulsive jet; if the pressure upstream of the nozzle is high enough, the flow will reach sonic speed (choke). The role of the nozzle in back-pressuring the engine is explained below.
- The energy to accelerate the stream comes from the temperature and pressure of the gas. The gas expands adiabatically with low losses and hence high efficiency. The gas accelerates to a final exit velocity which depends on the pressure and temperature at entry to the nozzle, the ambient pressure it exhausts to (unless the flow is choked), and the efficiency of the expansion. The efficiency is a measure of the losses due to friction, non-axial divergence as well as leakage in C-D nozzles.
- Airbreathing engines create forward thrust on the airframe by imparting a net rearward momentum to the exhaust gas. If thrust exceeds the resistance incurred by the aircraft moving through the air, it will accelerate. The jet may or may not be fully expanded.
- On some engines that are equipped with an afterburner the nozzle area is varied during non-afterburning or dry thrust conditions. Typically the nozzle is fully open for starting and at idle. It may then close down as the thrust lever is advanced reaching its minimum area before or at the Military or maximum dry thrust setting. Two examples of this control are the General Electric J-79 and the Klimov RD-33 in the MIG-29. Reasons for varying the nozzle area are explained in section: Nozzle area control during dry operation.

== Principal geometries ==
=== Convergent nozzle ===
Convergent nozzles are used on many jet engines. If the nozzle pressure ratio is above the critical value (about 1.8:1) a convergent nozzle will choke, resulting in some of the expansion to atmospheric pressure taking place downstream of the throat (i.e., smallest flow area), in the jet wake. Although jet momentum still produces much of the gross thrust, the imbalance between the throat static pressure and atmospheric pressure still generates some (pressure) thrust.

=== Divergent nozzle ===
The supersonic speed of the air flowing into a scramjet allows the use of a simple diverging nozzle

=== Convergent-divergent (C-D) nozzle ===
Engines capable of supersonic flight have convergent-divergent exhaust duct features to generate supersonic flow. Rocket engines — the extreme case — owe their distinctive shape to the very high area ratios of their nozzles.

When the pressure ratio across a convergent nozzle exceeds a critical value, the flow chokes, and thus the pressure of the exhaust exiting the engine exceeds the pressure of the surrounding air and cannot decrease via the conventional Venturi effect. This reduces the thrust producing efficiency of the nozzle by causing much of the expansion to take place downstream of the nozzle itself. Consequently, rocket engines and jet engines for supersonic flight incorporate a C-D nozzle which permits further expansion against the inside of the nozzle. However, unlike the fixed convergent-divergent nozzle used on a conventional rocket motor, those on turbojet engines must have heavy and expensive variable geometry to cope with the great variation in nozzle pressure ratio that occurs with speeds from subsonic to over Mach 3.

Nonetheless, low area ratio nozzles have subsonic applications.

== Types of nozzle ==
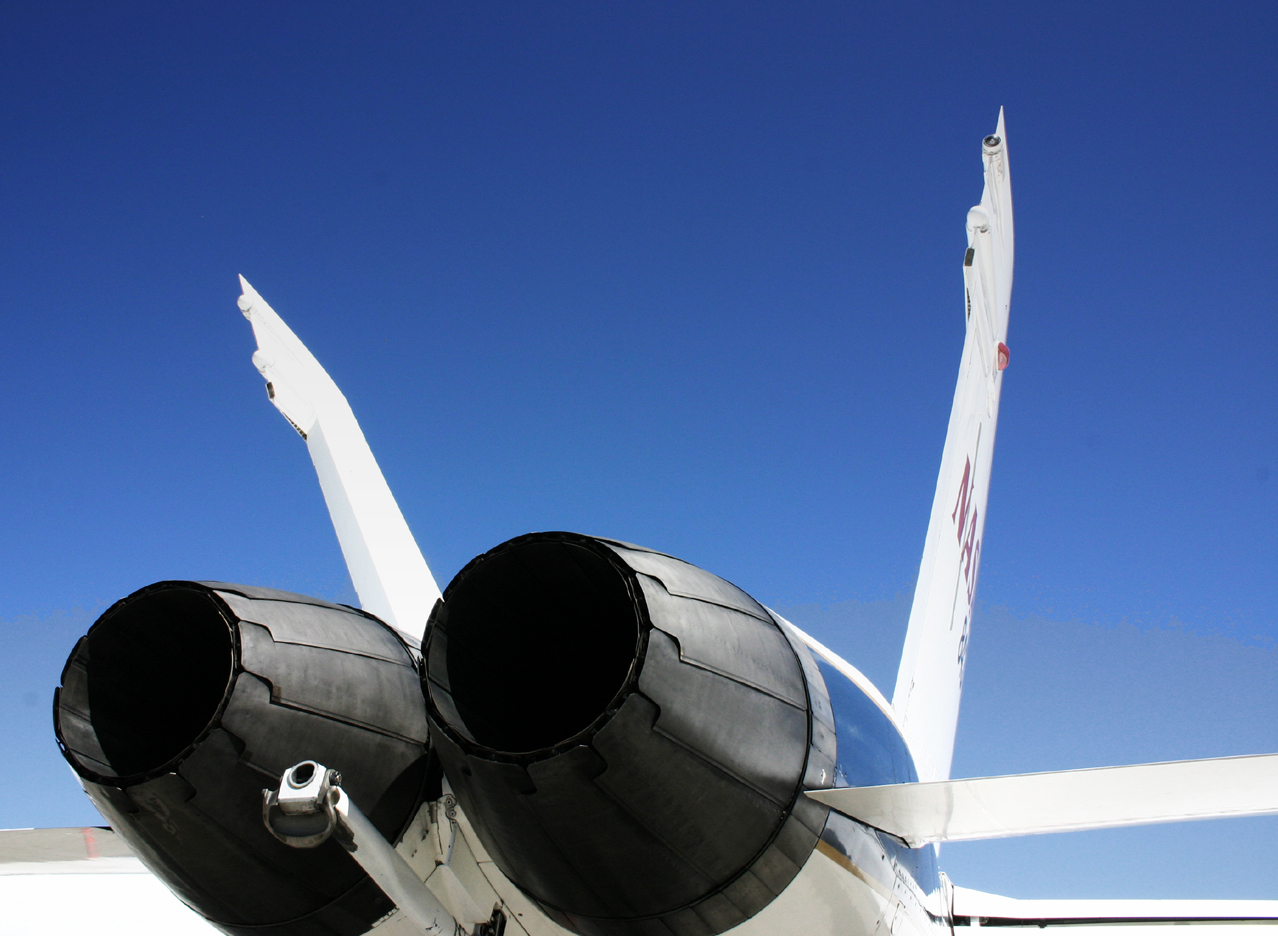
Variable exhaust nozzle, on the GE F404-400 low-bypass turbofan installed on a Boeing F/A-18 Hornet.

=== Fixed-area nozzle ===
Non-afterburning subsonic engines have nozzles of a fixed size because the changes in engine performance with altitude and subsonic flight speeds are acceptable with a fixed nozzle. This is not the case at supersonic speeds as described for Concorde below.

==== With low area ratio ====
At the other extreme, some high bypass ratio civil turbofans control the fan working line by using a convergent-divergent nozzle with an extremely low (less than 1.01) area ratio on the bypass (or mixed exhaust) stream. At low airspeeds, such a setup causes the nozzle to act as if it had variable geometry by preventing it from choking and allowing it to accelerate and decelerate exhaust gas approaching the throat and divergent section, respectively. Consequently, the nozzle exit area controls the fan match, which, being larger than the throat, pulls the fan working line slightly away from surge. At higher flight speeds, the ram rise in the intake chokes the throat and causes the nozzle's area to dictate the fan match; the nozzle, being smaller than the exit, causes the throat to push the fan working line slightly toward surge. This is not a problem, however, for a fan's surge margin is much greater at high flight speeds.

==== In rockets (with high area ratio) ====
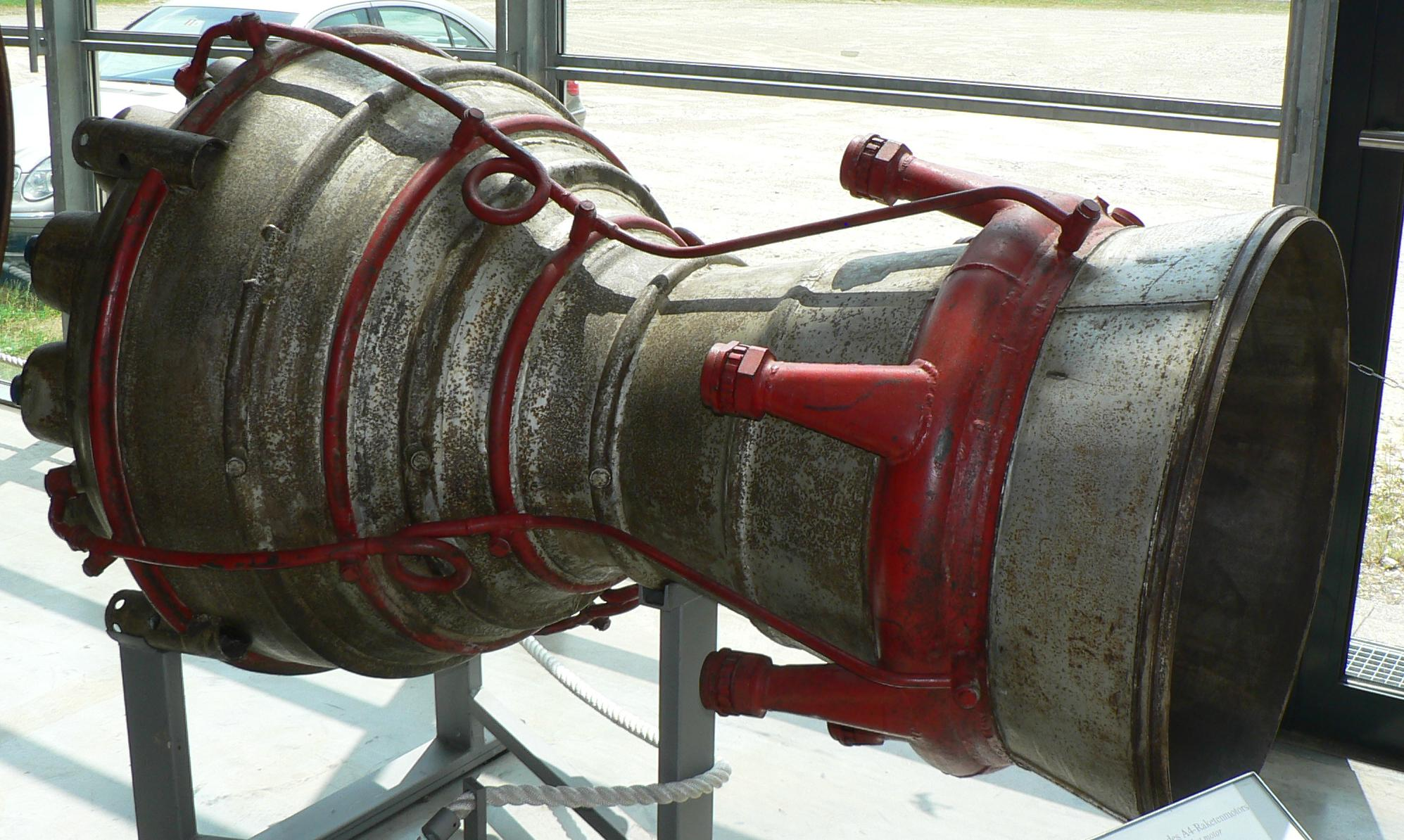
Rocket nozzle on V2.

Rocket motors also employ convergent-divergent nozzles, but these are usually of fixed geometry, to minimize weight. Because of the high pressure ratios associated with rocket flight, rocket motor convergent-divergent nozzles have a much greater area ratio (exit/throat) than those fitted to jet engines.

=== Variable-area for afterburning ===
The afterburners on combat aircraft require a bigger nozzle to prevent adversely affecting the operation of the engine. The variable area iris nozzle consists of a series of moving, overlapping petals with a nearly circular nozzle cross-section and is convergent to control the operation of the engine. If the aircraft is to fly at supersonic speeds, the afterburner nozzle may be followed by a separate divergent nozzle in an ejector nozzle configuration, as below, or the divergent geometry may be incorporated with the afterburner nozzle in the variable geometry convergent-divergent nozzle configuration, as below.

Early afterburners were either on or off and used a 2-position clamshell, or eyelid, nozzle which gave only one area available for afterburning use.

=== Ejector ===
Ejector refers to the pumping action of the very hot, high speed, engine exhaust entraining (ejecting) a surrounding airflow which, together with the internal geometry of the secondary, or diverging, nozzle controls the expansion of the engine exhaust. At subsonic speeds, the airflow constricts the exhaust to a convergent shape. When afterburning is selected and the aircraft speeds up, the two nozzles dilate, which allows the exhaust to form a convergent-divergent shape, speeding the exhaust gasses past Mach 1. More complex engine installations use a tertiary airflow to reduce exit area at low speeds. Advantages of the ejector nozzle are relative simplicity and reliability in cases where the secondary nozzle flaps are positioned by pressure forces. The ejector nozzle is also able to use air which has been ingested by the intake but which is not required by the engine. The amount of this air varies significantly across the flight envelope and ejector nozzles are well suited to matching the airflow between the intake system and engine. Efficient use of this air in the nozzle was a prime requirement for aircraft that had to cruise efficiently at high supersonic speeds for prolonged periods, hence its use in the SR-71, Concorde and XB-70 Valkyrie.

A simple example of ejector nozzle is the fixed geometry cylindrical shroud surrounding the afterburning nozzle on the J85 installation in the T-38 Talon. More complex were the arrangements used for the J58 (SR-71) and TF-30 (F-111) installations. They both used tertiary blow-in doors (open at lower speeds) and free-floating overlapping flaps for a final nozzle. Both the blow-in doors and the final nozzle flaps are positioned by a balance of internal pressure from the engine exhaust and external pressure from the aircraft flowfield.

On early J79 installations (F-104, F-4, A-5 Vigilante), actuation of the secondary nozzle was mechanically linked to the afterburner nozzle. Later installations had the final nozzle mechanically actuated separately from the afterburner nozzle. This gave improved efficiency (better match of primary/secondary exit area with high Mach number requirement) at Mach 2 (B-58 Hustler) and Mach 3 (XB-70).

=== Variable-geometry convergent-divergent ===
Turbofan installations which do not require a secondary airflow to be pumped by the engine exhaust use the variable geometry C-D nozzle. These engines don't require the external cooling air needed by turbojets (hot afterburner casing).

The divergent nozzle may be an integral part of the afterburner nozzle petal, an angled extension after the throat. The petals travel along curved tracks and the axial translation and simultaneous rotation increases the throat area for afterburning, while the trailing portion becomes a divergence with bigger exit area for more complete expansion at higher speeds. An example is the TF-30 (F-14).

The primary and secondary petals may be hinged together and actuated by the same mechanism to provide afterburner control and high nozzle pressure ratio expansion as on the EJ200 (Eurofighter). Other examples are found on the F-15, F-16, B-1B.

=== Additional features ===
==== Thrust-vectoring ====
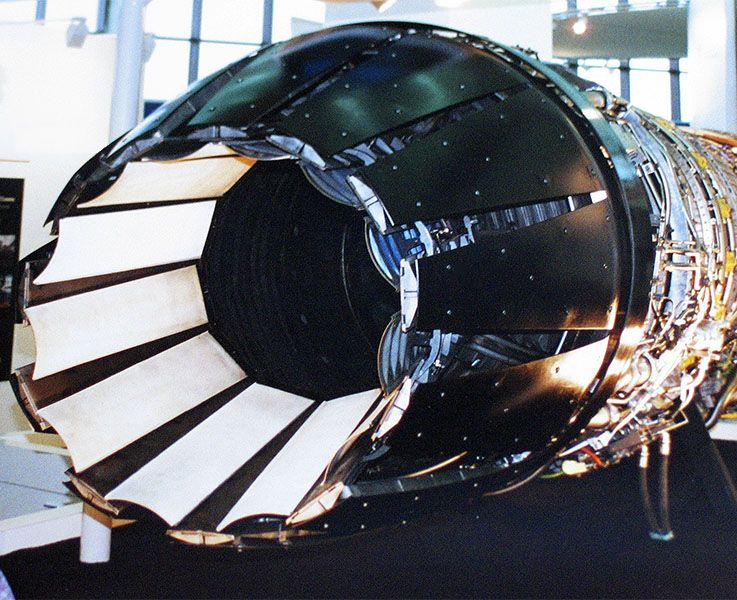
vectored thrust nozzle

Nozzles for vectored thrust include fixed geometry Bristol Siddeley Pegasus and variable geometry F119 (F-22).

==== Thrust-reversing ====
The thrust reversers on some engines are incorporated into the nozzle itself and are known as target thrust reversers. The nozzle opens up in two halves which come together to redirect the exhaust partially forward. Since the nozzle area has an influence on the operation of the engine (see below), the deployed thrust reverser has to be spaced the correct distance from the jetpipe to prevent changes in engine operating limits. Examples of target thrust reversers are found on the Fokker 100, Gulfstream IV and Dassault F7X.

==== Noise-reducing ====
Jet noise may be reduced by adding features to the exit of the nozzle which increase the surface area of the cylindrical jet. Commercial turbojets and early by-pass engines typically split the jet into multiple lobes. Modern high by-pass turbofans have triangular serrations, called chevrons, which protrude slightly into the propelling jet.

== Further topics ==
=== The other purpose of the propelling nozzle ===
The nozzle, by virtue of setting the back-pressure, acts as a downstream restrictor to the compressor, and thus determines what goes into the front of the engine. It shares this function with the other downstream restrictor, the turbine nozzle. The areas of both the propelling nozzle and turbine nozzle set the mass flow through the engine and the maximum pressure. While both these areas are fixed in many engines (i.e. those with a simple fixed propelling nozzle), others, most notably those with afterburning, have a variable area propelling nozzle. This area variation is necessary to contain the disturbing effect on the engine of the high combustion temperatures in the jet pipe, though the area may also be varied during non-afterburning operation to alter the pumping performance of the compressor at lower thrust settings.

For example, if the propelling nozzle were to be removed to convert a turbojet into a turboshaft, the role played by the nozzle area is now taken by the area of the power turbine nozzle guide vanes or stators.

=== Reasons for C-D nozzle over-expansion and examples ===
Overexpansion occurs when the exit area is too big relative to the size of the afterburner, or primary, nozzle. This occurred under certain conditions on the J85 installation in the T-38. The secondary or final nozzle was a fixed geometry sized for the maximum afterburner case. At non-afterburner thrust settings the exit area was too big for the closed engine nozzle giving over-expansion. Free-floating doors were added to the ejector allowing secondary air to control the primary jet expansion.

=== Reasons for C-D nozzle under-expansion and examples ===
For complete expansion to ambient pressure, and hence maximum nozzle thrust or efficiency, the required area ratio increases with flight Mach number. If the divergence is too short giving too small an exit area the exhaust will not expand to ambient pressure in the nozzle and there will be lost thrust potential With increasing Mach number there may come a point where the nozzle exit area is as big as the engine nacelle diameter or aircraft afterbody diameter. Beyond this point the nozzle diameter becomes the biggest diameter and starts to incur increasing drag. Nozzles are thus limited to the installation size and the loss in thrust incurred is a trade off with other considerations such as lower drag, less weight.

Examples are the F-16 at Mach 2.0 and the XB-70 at Mach 3.0.

Another consideration may relate to the required nozzle cooling flow. The divergent flaps or petals have to be isolated from the afterburner flame temperature, which may be of the order of 3,600 °F (1,980 °C), by a layer of cooling air. A longer divergence means more area to be cooled. The thrust loss from incomplete expansion is traded against the benefits of less cooling flow. This applied to the TF-30 nozzle in the F-14A where the ideal area ratio at Mach 2.4 was limited to a lower value.

=== What is adding a divergent section worth in real terms? ===
A divergent section gives added exhaust velocity and hence thrust at supersonic flight speeds.

The effect of adding a divergent section was demonstrated with Pratt & Whitney's first C-D nozzle. The convergent nozzle was replaced with a C-D nozzle on the same engine J57 in the same aircraft F-101. The increased thrust from the C-D nozzle (2,000 lb, 910 kg at sea-level take-off) on this engine raised the speed from Mach 1.6 to almost 2.0 enabling the Air Force to set a world's speed record of 1,207.6 mph (1,943.4 km/h) which was just below Mach 2 for the temperature on that day. The true worth of the C-D nozzle was not realised on the F-101 as the intake was not modified for the higher speeds attainable.

Another example was the replacement of a convergent with a C-D nozzle on the YF-106/P&W J75 when it would not quite reach Mach 2. Together with the introduction of the C-D nozzle, the inlet was redesigned. The USAF subsequently set a world's speed record with the F-106 of 1526 mph (Mach 2.43).

=== Nozzle area control during dry operation ===
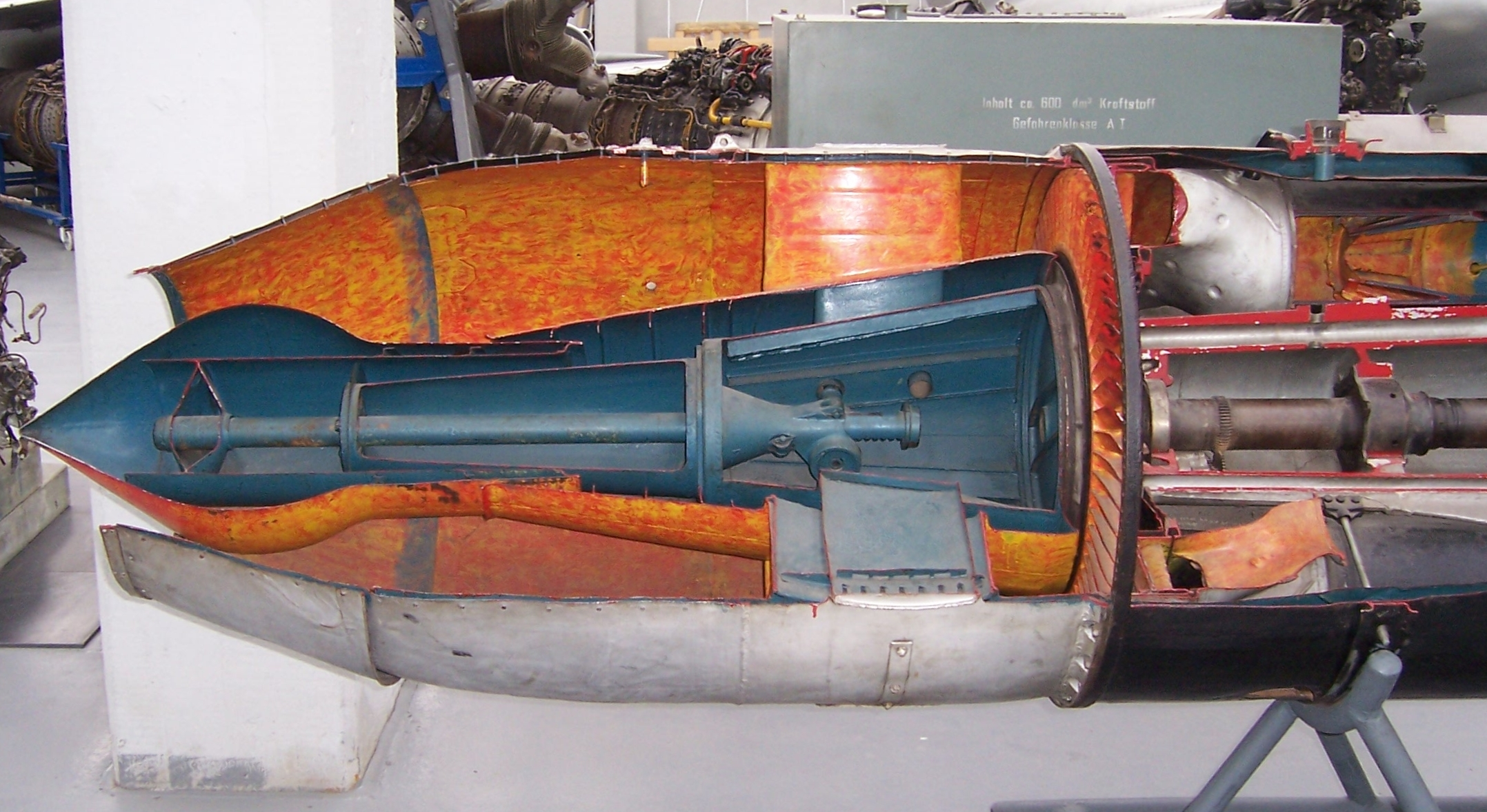
Sectioned Jumo 004 exhaust nozzle, showing the Zwiebel central plug.

Some very early jet engines that were not equipped with an afterburner, such as the BMW 003 and the Jumo 004 (which had a design ), had a variable area nozzle formed by a translating plug known as a Zwiebel [wild onion] from its shape. The Jumo 004 had a large area for starting to prevent overheating the turbine and a smaller area for take-off and flight to give higher exhaust velocity and thrust. The 004's Zwiebel possessed a 40 cm (16 in) range of forward/reverse travel to vary the exhaust nozzle area, driven by an electric motor-driven mechanism within the body's divergent area just behind the turbine.

Afterburner-equipped engines may also open the nozzle for starting and at idle. The idle thrust is reduced which lowers taxi speeds and brake wear. This feature on the J75 engine in the F-106 was called 'Idle Thrust Control' and reduced idle thrust by 40%. On aircraft carriers, lower idle thrust reduces the hazards from jet blast.

In some applications, such as the J79 installation in various aircraft, during fast throttle advances, the nozzle area may be prevented from closing beyond a certain point to allow a more rapid increase in RPM and hence faster time to maximum thrust.

In the case of a 2-spool turbojet, such as the Olympus 593 in Concorde, the nozzle area may be varied to enable simultaneous achievement of maximum low-pressure compressor speed and maximum turbine entry temperature over the wide range of engine entry temperatures which occurs with flight speeds up to Mach 2.

On some augmented turbofans the fan operating line is controlled with nozzle area during both dry and wet operation to trade excess surge margin for more thrust.

=== Nozzle area control during wet operation ===
The nozzle area is increased during afterburner operation to limit the upstream effects on the engine. To run a turbofan to give maximum airflow (thrust), the nozzle area may be controlled to keep the fan operating line in its optimum position. For a turbojet to give maximum thrust, the area may be controlled to keep the turbine exhaust temperature at its limit.

=== What happens if the nozzle doesn't open when the afterburner is selected? ===
In early afterburner installations, the pilot had to check the nozzle position indicator after selecting afterburner. If the nozzle did not open for some reason, and the pilot did not react by cancelling the afterburner selection, typical controls of that period (e.g. the J47 in the F-86L), could cause the turbine blades to overheat and fail.

=== Other applications ===
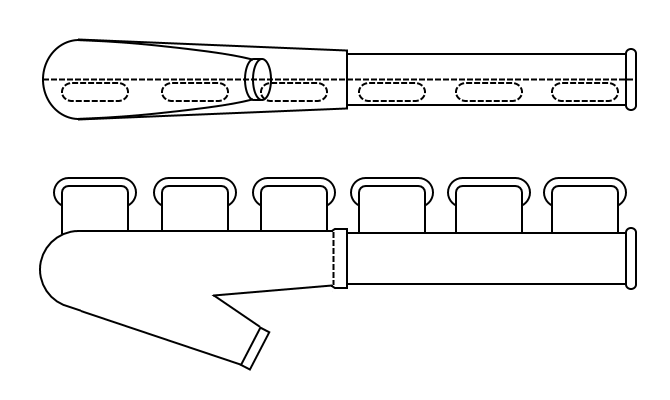
Sketch showing rearward-discharge of gas from exhaust manifold.

Certain aircraft, like the German Bf 109 and the Macchi C.202/205 were fitted with "ejector-type exhausts". These exhausts converted some of the waste energy of the (internal combustion) engines exhaust-flow into a small amount of forward thrust by accelerating the hot gasses in a rearward direction to a speed greater than that of the aircraft. All exhaust configurations do this to some extent if the exhaust gasses are discharged in a rearward direction.

A particular thrust-producing exhaust device was patented by Rolls-Royce Limited in 1937. On the 1944 de Havilland Hornet's Rolls-Royce Merlin 130/131 engines the thrust from the multi-ejector exhausts were equivalent to an extra 70bhp per-engine at full-throttle height.

== See also ==
- Components of jet engines
- De Laval nozzle
- Expansion deflection nozzle
- Jet engine performance
- Rocket engine nozzles
