= General Electric YJ93 =

Turbojet engine

YJ93
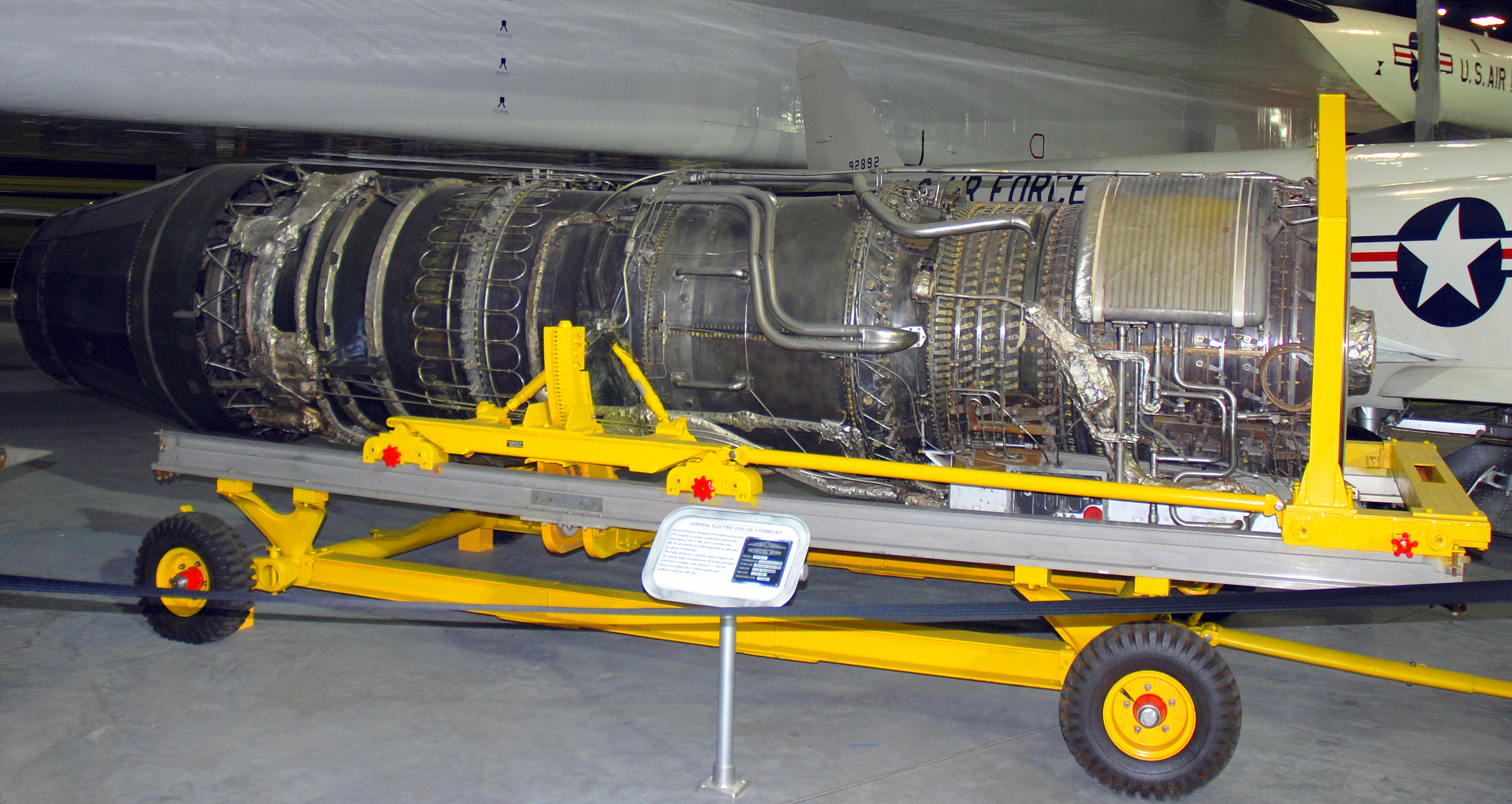
- YJ93-GE-3 engine at the National Museum of the United States Air Force
- Type: Turbojet engine
- National origin: United States
- Manufacturer: General Electric Aircraft Engines
- Major applications: North American XB-70 Valkyrie
- Developed into: General Electric GE4

The General Electric YJ93 turbojet engine was designed as the powerplant for both the North American XB-70 Valkyrie bomber and the North American XF-108 Rapier interceptor. The YJ93 was a single-shaft axial-flow turbojet with a variable-stator compressor and a fully variable convergent/divergent exhaust nozzle. The maximum sea-level thrust was 28,800 lbf (128 kN).

== Design and development ==
The YJ93 started life as the General Electric J79-X275, an enlarged version of the General Electric J79 turbojet with "275" meaning Mach 2.75, the engine's target operating speed. This design evolved into the X279 when Mach 3 cruise became a requirement, and ultimately became the YJ93.

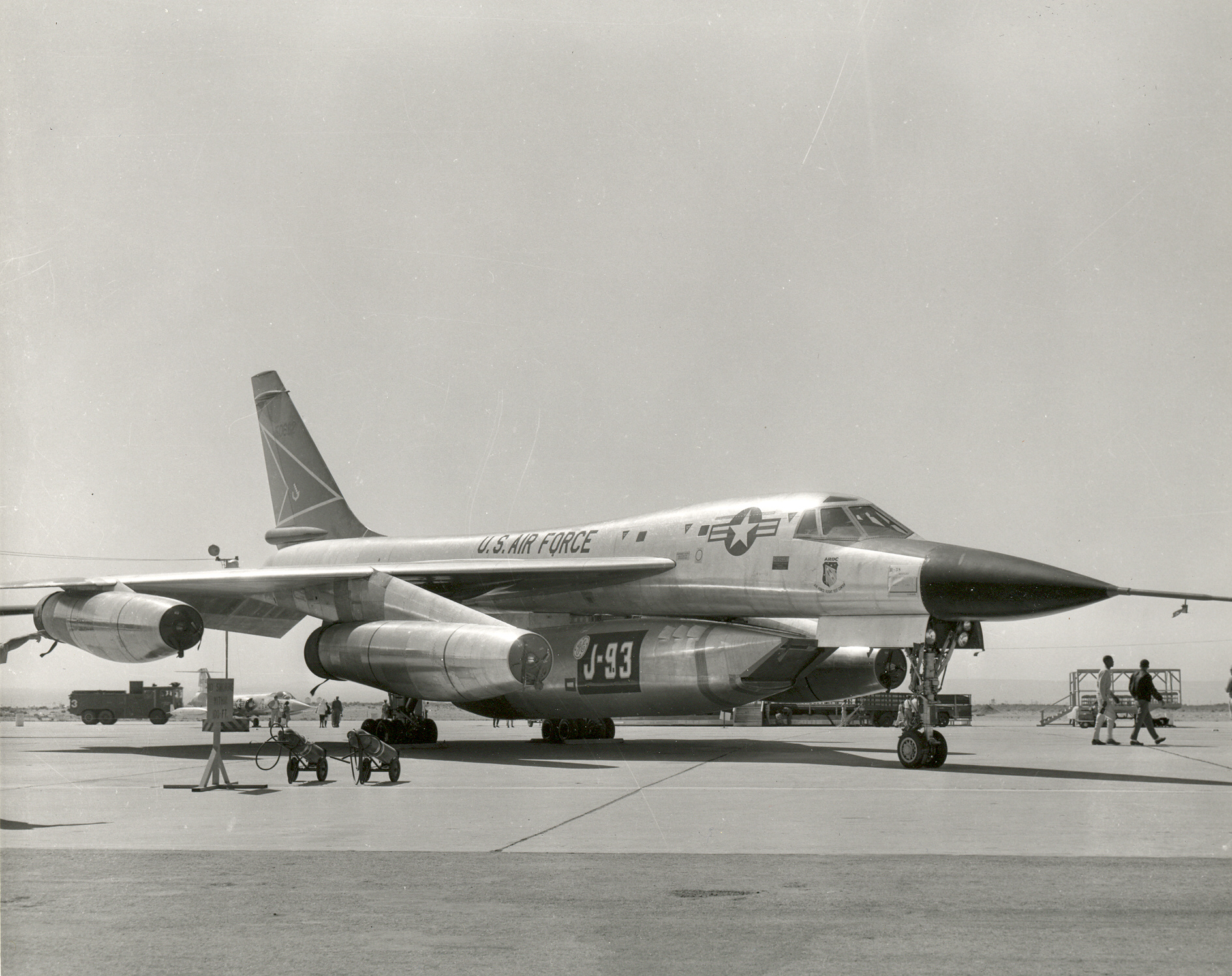
YB-58 at Edwards AFB with GE J93 engine pod

The engine used a special high-temperature JP-6 fuel. The six YJ93 engines in the XB-70 Valkyrie were capable of producing a thrust to weight ratio of 5:1 allowing for a speed of 2,000 mph (3,200 km/h) (approximately Mach 3) at an altitude of 70,000 feet (21,000 m). The first engine went on test in September 1958 and featured advanced technology achievements such as electrolytically drilling longitudinal air cooling holes in the turbine blades.

The XF-108 interceptor was cancelled outright, and the B-70 project was re-oriented to a research project only.

== Variants ==
Thrust given in pounds force (lbf) and kilonewtons (kN).

J93-GE-1
24,800 lbf (110 kN) with afterburner.
J93-GE-3
Production variant produced in small numbers for the North American XB-70 Valkyrie program.
J93-GE-3R
Variant with thrust reverser, 27,200 lbf (121 kN) with afterburner.
J93-GE-3AR
Variant intended for the North American XF-108 Rapier.

== Applications ==
- Convair NB-58A Hustler (testbed)
- North American XB-70 Valkyrie
- North American XF-108 Rapier (intended)

== Specifications (J93-GE-3) ==
Data from Aircraft engines of the World 1966/77, Military Turbojet/Turbofan Specifications, North American XB-70A Valkyrie

==== General characteristics ====
- Type: Turbojet with afterburner
- Length: 237 in (6,000 mm)
- Diameter: 52.5 in (1,330 mm)
- Dry weight: 5,000 lb (2,300 kg)

==== Components ====
- Compressor: 11-stage axial
- Combustors: Annular with 36 dual fuel nozzles
- Turbine: Two-stage axial
- Fuel type: Special high-temperature JP-6 Fuel to MIL-F-25656
- Oil system: Return oil spray system at 60 psi (410 kPa)

==== Performance ====
- Maximum thrust: 22,000 lbf (98 kN) dry; 30,000 lbf (130 kN) with afterburner
- Air mass flow: 275 lb/s (125 kg/s)
- Turbine inlet temperature: 1,149 °C (2,100 °F; 1,422 K)
- Specific fuel consumption: 0.700 lb/(lbf⋅h) (19.8 g/(kN⋅s)) dry; 1.800 lb/(lbf⋅h) (51.0 g/(kN⋅s)) wet
- Thrust-to-weight ratio: 6

== See also ==
Related development

- General Electric J79
- General Electric GE4

Comparable engines

- de Havilland Gyron
- Kolesov RD-36-51
- Kuznetsov NK-32
- Kuznetsov NK-144
- Lyulka AL-7
- Orenda Iroquois
- Pratt & Whitney J58
- Rolls-Royce RB.106
- Tumansky R-15

Related lists

- List of aircraft engines
