= Waspaloy =

Nickel-based superalloy, United Technologies Corp trademark

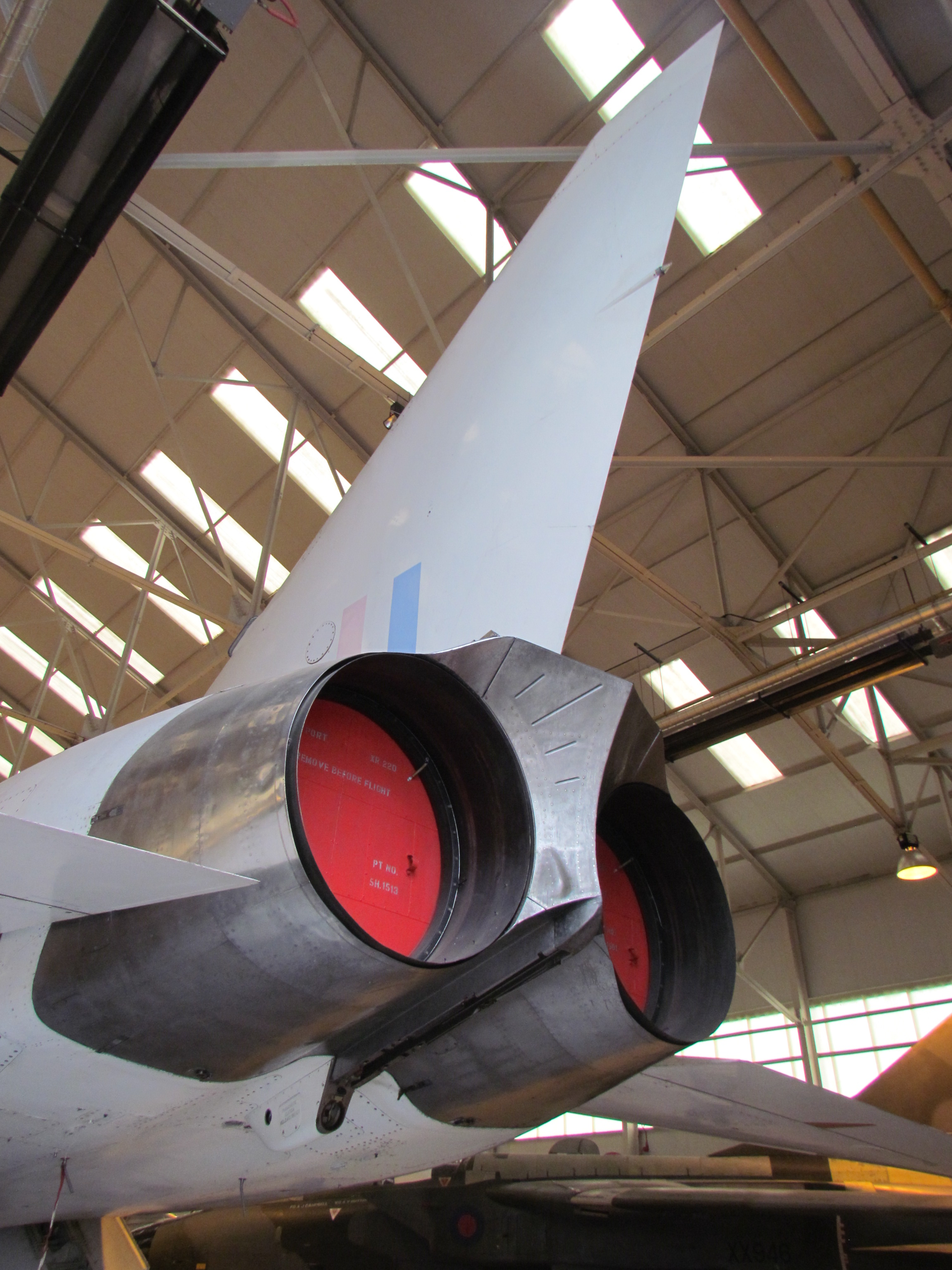
The tail of a TSR-2, showing the unpainted Waspaloy fairing.

Waspaloy is a registered trademark of United Technologies Corp that refers to an age-hardening austenitic (face-centred cubic) nickel-based superalloy. Waspaloy is typically used in high-temperature applications, particularly in gas turbines.

== Nominal composition ==
Nickel 58%, chromium 19%, cobalt 13%, molybdenum 4%, titanium 3%, aluminium 1.4%

=== Chemistry Table ===
	Cr	Ni	Mo	Co	Al	Ti	B	C	Zr	Fe	Mn	Si	P	S	Cu
MIN	18.00	--	3.50	12.00	1.20	2.75	0.003	0.02	0.02	--	--	--	--	--	--
MAX	21.00	Balance	5.00	15.00	1.60	3.25	0.01	0.10	0.08	2.00	0.10	0.15	0.015	0.015	0.10

== Properties ==
Waspaloy is an age-hardenable, nickel-based superalloy with excellent strength properties at temperatures up to roughly 980 °C (1,800 °F). Other characteristics of Waspaloy include good corrosion resistance, as well as being relatively impervious to oxidation, making it well-suited for service in extreme environments.

Waspaloy has useful strength at temperatures up to 760–870 °C (1,400–1,600 °F), and good oxidation resistance in gas turbine engine atmospheres up to 870 °C (1,600 °F). The creep rupture strength of Waspaloy is superior to that of Alloy 718 at temperatures above 620–650 °C (1,150–1,200 °F). Its short-time hot tensile strength is inferior to that of RA718 at temperatures up to 730 °C (1,350 °F).

== Uses ==
Waspaloy is often used in extreme environments. It is common in gas turbine blades, seals, rings, shafts, and turbine disks. The NIST certified reference material 1243, a standard for X-ray fluorescence spectroscopy, is made from Waspaloy.

The British Aircraft Corporation TSR-2, a supersonic strike aircraft developed from the late 1950s, had a fairing to its rear fuselage around the exhaust nozzles. Owing to the high temperatures in this area, the fairing was formed of Waspaloy and left unpainted. Fabrication of this alloy was described as "very intractable" and was carried out by the engine specialists Bristol, rather than the airframe builders BAC.
