= Morien Morgan =

Welsh aeronautical engineer

Morien Morgan at his desk with supersonic transport aircraft models in a BBC documentary in 1964

Sir Morien Bedford Morgan CB FRS (20 December 1912 – 4 April 1978), was a noted Welsh aeronautical engineer, sometimes known as "the Father of Concorde". He spent most of his career at the Royal Aircraft Establishment (RAE), before moving to Whitehall for ten years as the Controller of Aircraft within the Ministry of Aviation. He spent the last years of his life as master of Downing College, Cambridge.

== Biography ==
He was born in Bridgend, the son of draper John Bedford Morgan and teacher Edith Mary. Thomas, was the fourth great grandson of John Bedford. He studied at local schools (Bridgend Primary School, Aberdare Boys' School, Canton Boys' School, Rutlish School), then at Magdalen College School, Oxford, and from 1931, St Catharine's College, Cambridge. It was during his time at Cambridge that he became fascinated with aircraft, and won the John Bernard Seely prize in aeronautics in 1934.

After a brief apprenticeship at Vickers Aviation, Morgan took a position at the Aerodynamics Department within the RAE in 1935. Based in Farnborough, there he met Sylvia Axford and married on 19 April 1941. They had three daughters, Carol, Deryn and Gwyneth.

In 1959 he left the RAE to become the scientific advisor to the Air Ministry, and then from 1960 to 1969 held a variety of posts within the Ministry. He returned to the RAE as Director in 1969, and served in this role until 1972. In 1967, he became the first Welshman to be President of the Royal Aeronautical Society.

In 1972 he succeeded Prof. Keith Guthrie as Master of Downing College, Cambridge, a post he held until his death. At Downing "his enthusiasm and good humour together with his Welsh charm, eloquence, and love of music" made sure that he got on well with everyone. His love of music was widely noted.

Morgan was appointed a Companion of the Order of the Bath (CB) in the 1958 Queen's Birthday Honours, and knighted in the 1969 New Year Honours. He became a Fellow of the Royal Society in 1972.

== Supersonic Research ==
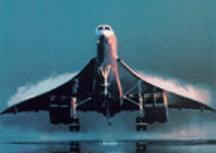
Morgan led research into supersonic transport that culminated in the Concorde passenger aircraft.

In 1948 Morgan began research into the development of a supersonic passenger airliner. In November 1956 he became Chairman of the newly formed Supersonic Transport Aircraft Committee, or STAC. STAC funded research into the SST field at several UK aviation firms though the 1950s. By the late 1950s, STAC had started the process of selecting specific designs for development, and after the forced merger of most UK aviation firms in 1960, selected the Bristol 223 as the basis for a transatlantic design. The Bristol work would form the basis for the Concorde. At the time he commented that:

Light alloy construction would be used, and engines could be straightforward developments of present-day large jet units. Long slender shapes, with subsonic leading edges and supersonic trailing edges, can give sufficiently high L/D while the optimum cruise aspect ratio is large enough for a sensible compromise to be visualized between cruising efficiency and reasonable approach speed.

— Morien Morgan, June 1960,

During the Concorde work, Morgan tirelessly worked through problems, both technical and political, to see the project to its conclusion. Alternating with his French counterpart, Robert Vergnaud, he chaired the Concorde oversight committee from 1963 when work began in earnest, to 1966 when prototype construction was well advanced. Given the aircraft was the first of its sort, the relatively rapid progress from design to construction is notable (testing and certification took much longer, however). Morgan noted:

I became convinced – than in this I have been reinforced of late by the impressive way in which Concorde is ploughing through the prototype flying phase – that in aeronautical design and research a combination of Gallic fervor and British phlegm produces pretty impressive results by any standards. It is a combination well worth preserving.

Academic offices
Preceded by William Keith Chambers Guthrie	Master of Downing College, Cambridge; 1972–1978	Succeeded by John Butterfield
Professional and academic associations
Preceded by Prof Alexander Duncan Baxter	President of the Royal Aeronautical Society; 1967–68	Succeeded by Prof David Keith-Lucas
