= Concorde =

British–French supersonic airliner

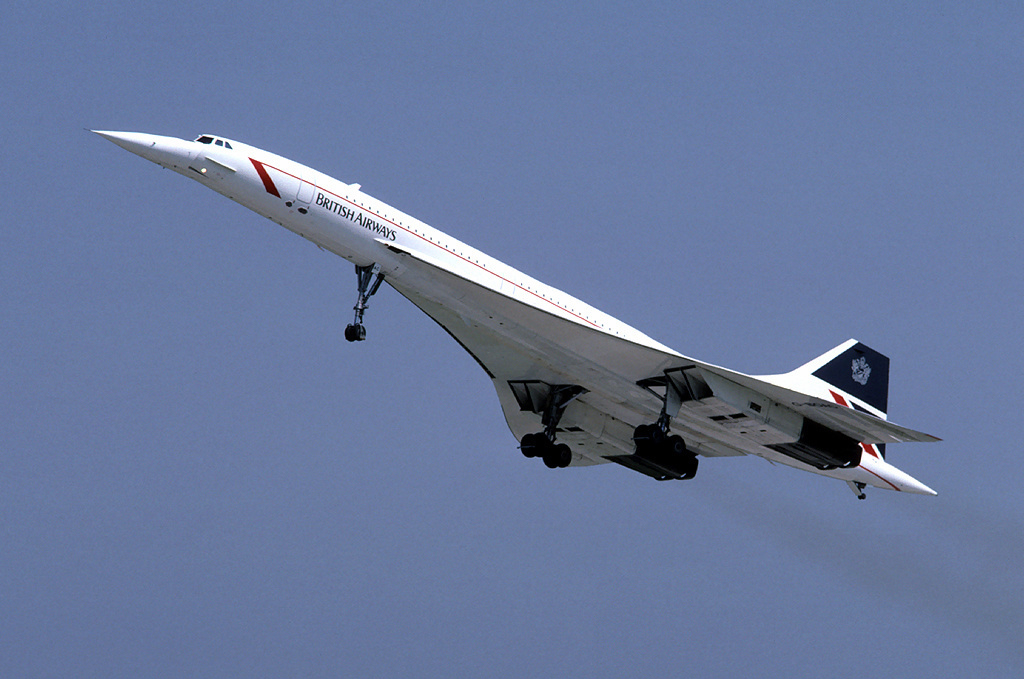
- Concorde after takeoff in 1986

General information
- Type: Supersonic airliner
- National origin: France and United Kingdom
- Manufacturer: British Aircraft Corporation (later British Aerospace and BAE Systems); Sud Aviation (later Aérospatiale and Airbus)
- Status: Retired
- Primary users: British Airways Air France; See Operators below for others
- Number built: 20

History
- Manufactured: 1965–1979
- Introduction date: 21 January 1976
- First flight: 2 March 1969
- Retired: 24 October 2003; 23 years ago (last commercial flight); 26 November 2003; 22 years ago (final flight to Bristol Filton Airport)
- Fate: 18 preserved in museums; 1 scrapped and 1 destroyed

Concorde (/ˈkɒŋkɔːrd/ KONG-kord, French: [kɔ̃kɔʁd]) is a retired Anglo-French supersonic airliner jointly developed and manufactured by Sud Aviation and the British Aircraft Corporation (BAC). Studies began in 1954 and a UK–France treaty followed in 1962, as the programme cost was estimated at £70 million (£1.77 billion in 2025). Construction of six prototypes began in February 1965, with the first flight from Toulouse on 2 March 1969. The market forecast was 350 aircraft, with manufacturers receiving up to 100 options from major airlines. On 9 October 1975, it received its French certificate of airworthiness, and was certified by the UK CAA on 5 December.

Concorde is an aircraft design with a narrow fuselage permitting four-abreast seating for 92 to 128 passengers, an ogival delta wing, and a droop nose for landing visibility. It is powered by four Rolls-Royce/Snecma Olympus 593 turbojets with variable engine intake ramps, and reheat for take-off and acceleration to supersonic speed. Constructed from aluminium, it was the first airliner to have analogue fly-by-wire flight controls. The airliner had transatlantic range while supercruising at twice the speed of sound for 75% of the distance.

Delays and cost overruns pushed costs to £1.5–2.1 billion in 1976 (£12–16.7 billion in 2025). Concorde entered service on 21 January 1976 with Air France from Paris-Roissy and British Airways from London Heathrow. Transatlantic flights were the main market, to Washington Dulles from 24 May, and to New York JFK from 17 October 1977. Air France and British Airways remained the sole customers with seven airframes each, for a total production of twenty. Supersonic flight more than halved travel times, but sonic booms over the ground limited it to transoceanic flights only. Its only competitor was the Tupolev Tu-144, carrying passengers from November 1977 until a May 1978 crash, while a potential competitor, the Boeing 2707, was cancelled in 1971 before any prototypes were built.

On 25 July 2000, Air France Flight 4590 crashed shortly after take-off with all 109 occupants and four on the ground killed. This was the only fatal incident involving Concorde; commercial service was suspended until November 2001. The remaining aircraft were retired in 2003, 27 years after commercial operations had begun. Eighteen of the twenty aircraft built are preserved and are on display in Europe and North America.

== Development ==
=== Early studies ===
In the early 1950s, Arnold Hall, director of the Royal Aircraft Establishment (RAE), asked Morien Morgan to form a committee to study supersonic transport (SST). The group met in February 1954 and delivered their first report in April 1955. Robert T. Jones' work at NACA had demonstrated that the drag at supersonic speeds was strongly related to the span of the wing. This led to the use of short-span, thin, trapezoidal wings such as those seen on the control surfaces of many missiles, or aircraft such as the Lockheed F-104 Starfighter interceptor or the planned Avro 730 strategic bomber that the team studied. The team outlined a baseline configuration that resembled an enlarged Avro 730.

This short wingspan produced little lift at low speed, resulting in long take-off runs and high landing speeds. In an SST design, this would have required enormous engine power to lift off from existing runways, and to provide the fuel needed, "some horribly large aeroplanes" resulted. Based on this, the group considered the concept of an SST infeasible, and instead suggested continued low-level studies into supersonic aerodynamics.

=== Slender deltas ===
Soon after, Johanna Weber and Dietrich Küchemann at the RAE published a series of reports on a new wing planform, known in the UK as the "slender delta". The team, including Eric Maskell whose report "Flow Separation in Three Dimensions" contributed to an understanding of separated flow, worked with the fact that delta wings can produce strong vortices on their upper surfaces at high angles of attack. The vortex will lower the air pressure and cause lift. This had been noticed by Chuck Yeager in the Convair XF-92, but its qualities had not been fully appreciated. Weber suggested that the effect could be used to improve low-speed performance.

Küchemann and Weber's papers changed the entire nature of supersonic design. The delta had already been used on aircraft, but these designs used planforms that were not much different from a swept wing of the same span. Weber noted that the lift from the vortex was increased by the length of the wing it had to operate over, which suggested that the effect would be maximised by extending the wing along the fuselage as far as possible. Such a layout would still have good supersonic performance, but also have reasonable take-off and landing speeds using vortex generation. The aircraft would have to take off and land very "nose high" to generate the required vortex lift, which led to questions about the low-speed handling qualities of such a design.

Küchemann presented the idea at a meeting where Morgan was also present. Test pilot Eric Brown recalls Morgan's reaction to the presentation, saying that he immediately seized on it as the solution to the SST problem. Brown considers this moment as being the birth of the Concorde project.

=== Supersonic Transport Aircraft Committee ===
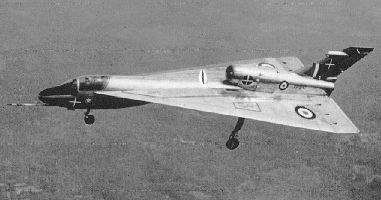
The HP.115 tested the low-speed performance of the slender delta layout.

On 1 October 1956, the Ministry of Supply asked Morgan to form a new study group, the Supersonic Transport Aircraft Committee (STAC), (Note: sometimes referred to as the Supersonic Transport Advisory Committee) to develop a practical SST design and find industry partners to build it. At the first meeting, on 5 November 1956, the decision was made to fund the development of a test-bed aircraft to examine the low-speed performance of the slender delta, a contract that eventually produced the Handley Page HP.115. This aircraft demonstrated safe control at speeds as low as 69 mph (111 km/h), about one-third that of the F-104 Starfighter.

Lift is not generated the same way at supersonic and subsonic speeds, with the lift-to-drag ratio for supersonic designs being about half that of subsonic designs. The aircraft would need more thrust than a subsonic design of the same size. Although they would use more fuel in cruise, they would be able to fly more revenue-earning flights in a given time, so fewer aircraft would be needed to service a particular route. This would remain economically advantageous as long as fuel represented a small percentage of operational costs. STAC concluded that an SST would have economic performance similar to existing subsonic types.

STAC suggested that two designs naturally fell out of their work, a transatlantic model flying at about Mach 2, and a shorter-range version flying at Mach 1.2. Morgan suggested that a 150-passenger transatlantic SST would cost about £75 to £90 million to develop, and be in service in 1970. The smaller 100-passenger short-range version would cost perhaps £50 to £80 million, and be ready for service in 1968. To meet this schedule, development would need to begin in 1960, with production contracts let in 1962. Morgan suggested that the US was already involved in a similar project, and that if the UK failed to respond, it would be locked out of an airliner market that he believed would be dominated by SST aircraft.

In 1959, a study contract was awarded to Hawker Siddeley and Bristol for preliminary designs based on the slender delta, which developed as the HSA.1000 and Bristol 198. Armstrong Whitworth also responded with an internal design, the M-Wing, for the lower-speed, shorter-range category. Both the STAC group and the government were looking for partners to develop the designs. In September 1959, Hawker approached Lockheed, and after the creation of British Aircraft Corporation in 1960, the former Bristol team immediately started talks with Boeing, General Dynamics, Douglas Aircraft, and Sud Aviation.

=== Ogee planform selected ===
Küchemann and others at the RAE continued their work on the slender delta throughout this period, considering three basic shapes - the classic straight-edge delta, the "gothic delta" that was rounded outward to appear like a gothic arch, and the "ogival wing" that was compound-rounded into the shape of an ogee. Each of these planforms had advantages and disadvantages. As they worked with these shapes, a practical concern grew to become so important that it forced selection of one of these designs.

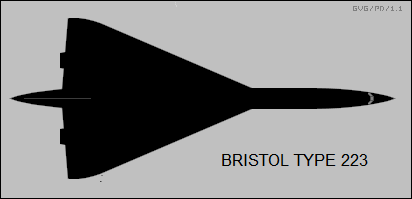
Plan-view silhouette of the Bristol Type 223 SST project, with an earlier straight-edge wing planform.

Generally, the wing's centre of pressure (CP, or "lift point") should be close to the aircraft's centre of gravity (CG, or "balance point") to reduce the amount of control force required to pitch the aircraft. As the aircraft layout changes during the design phase, the CG commonly moves fore or aft. With a normal wing design, this can be addressed by moving the wing slightly fore or aft to account for this. With a delta wing running most of the length of the fuselage, this was no longer easy; moving the wing would leave it in front of the nose or behind the tail. Studying the various layouts in terms of CG changes, both during design and changes owing to fuel use during flight, the ogee planform immediately came to the fore.

To test the new wing, NASA assisted the team by modifying a Douglas F5D Skylancer to mimic the wing selection. In 1965, the NASA test aircraft successfully tested the wing, and found that it reduced landing speeds noticeably over the standard delta wing. NASA also ran simulations at Ames that showed the aircraft would exhibit a sudden change in pitch when entering ground effect. Ames test pilots later participated in a joint cooperative test with the French and British test pilots and found that the simulations had been correct, and this information was added to pilot training.

=== Partnership with Sud Aviation ===
France had its own SST plans. In the late 1950s, the government requested designs from the government-owned Sud Aviation and Nord Aviation, as well as Dassault. All three returned designs based on Küchemann and Weber's slender delta; Nord suggested a ramjet-powered design flying at Mach 3, and the other two were jet-powered Mach 2 designs that were similar to each other. Of the three, the Sud Aviation Super-Caravelle won the design contest with a medium-range design deliberately sized to avoid competition with transatlantic US designs they assumed were already on the drawing board.

As soon as the design was complete, in April 1960, Pierre Satre, the company's technical director, was sent to Bristol to discuss a partnership. Bristol was surprised to find that the Sud team had designed a similar aircraft after considering the SST problem and coming to the same conclusions as the Bristol and STAC teams in terms of economics. It was later revealed that the original STAC report, marked "For UK Eyes Only", had secretly been passed to France to win political favour. Sud made minor changes to the paper and presented it as their own work.

France had no modern large jet engines and had already decided to buy a British design (as they had on the earlier subsonic Caravelle). As neither company had experience in the use of heat-resistant metals for airframes, a maximum speed of around Mach 2 was selected so aluminium could be used – above this speed, the friction with the air heats the metal so much that it begins to soften. This lower speed would also speed development and allow their design to fly before the Americans. Everyone involved agreed that Küchemann's ogee-shaped wing was the right one.

The British team was still focused on a 150-passenger design serving transatlantic routes, while France was deliberately avoiding these. Common components could be used in both designs, with the shorter-range version using a clipped fuselage and four engines, and the longer one a stretched fuselage and six engines, leaving only the wing to be extensively redesigned. The teams continued to meet in 1961, and by this time it was clear that the two aircraft would be very similar in spite of different ranges and seating arrangements. A single design emerged that differed mainly in fuel load. More-powerful Bristol Siddeley Olympus engines, being developed for the TSR-2, allowed either design to be powered by only four engines.

=== Cabinet response, treaty ===
While the development teams met, the French Minister of Public Works and Transport Robert Buron was meeting with the UK Minister of Aviation Peter Thorneycroft, and Thorneycroft told the cabinet that France was much more serious about a partnership than any of the US companies. The various US companies had proved uninterested, likely owing to the belief that the government would be funding development and would frown on any partnership with a European company, and the risk of "giving away" US technological leadership to a European partner.

When the STAC plans were presented to the UK cabinet, the economic considerations were considered highly questionable, especially as these were based on development costs, now estimated to be £150 million (US$420 million), which were repeatedly overrun in the industry. The Treasury Ministry presented a negative view, suggesting that the project in no way would have any positive financial returns for the government, especially because "the industry's past record of over-optimistic estimating (including the recent history of the TSR.2) suggests that it would be prudent to consider" the cost "to turn out much too low."

This led to an independent review of the project by the Committee on Civil Scientific Research and Development, which met on the topic between July and September 1962. The committee rejected the economic arguments, including considerations of supporting the industry made by Thorneycroft. Their report in October stated that any direct positive economic outcome would be unlikely, but that the project should still be considered because everyone else was going supersonic, and they were concerned they would be locked out of future markets. The project apparently would not be likely to significantly affect other, more important, research efforts.

At the time, the UK was pressing for admission to the European Economic Community, and this became the main rationale for moving ahead with the aircraft. The development project was negotiated as an international treaty between the two countries rather than a commercial agreement between companies, and included a clause, originally asked for by the UK government, imposing heavy penalties for cancellation. This treaty was signed on 29 November 1962. Charles de Gaulle vetoed the UK's entry into the European Community in a speech on 25 January 1963.

=== Naming ===
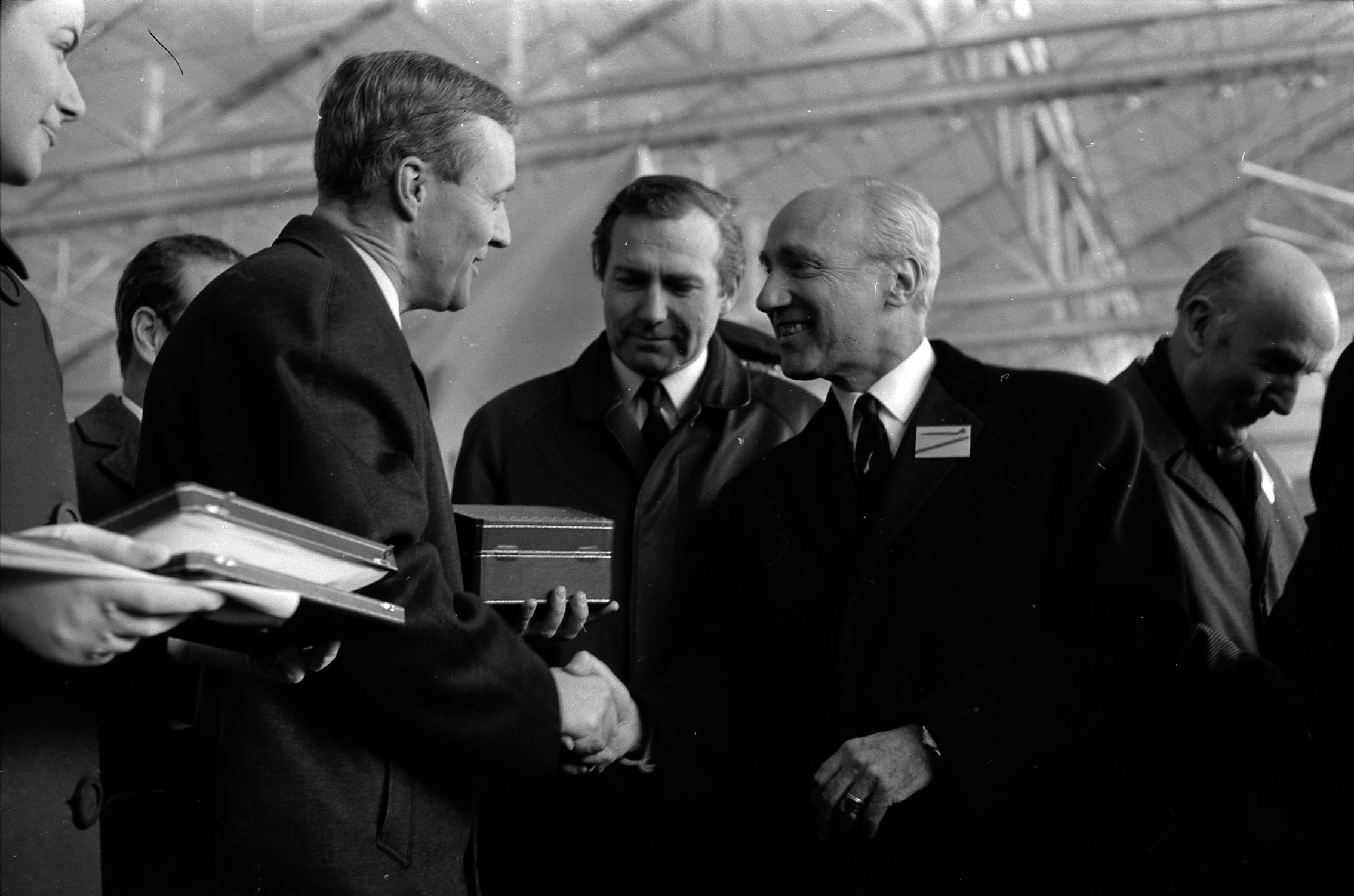
British minister of technology Tony Benn (left) and Sud Aviation president Maurice Papon (right) during the presentation of the French Concorde prototype, December 1967.

At Charles de Gaulle's January 1963 press conference, the aircraft was first called "Concorde". The name was suggested by the 18-year-old son of F.G. Clark, the publicity manager at BAC's Filton plant. Reflecting the treaty between the British and French governments that led to Concorde's construction, the name Concorde is from the French word concorde (IPA: [kɔ̃kɔʁd]), which has an English equivalent, concord. Both words mean agreement, harmony, or union. The name was changed to Concord by Harold Macmillan in response to a perceived slight by de Gaulle. At the French roll-out in Toulouse in late 1967, the British Minister of Technology, Tony Benn, announced that he would change the spelling back to Concorde. This created a nationalist uproar that died down when Benn stated that the suffixed "e" represented "Excellence, England, Europe, and Entente (Cordiale)". In his memoirs, he recounted a letter from a Scotsman claiming, "you talk about 'E' for England, but part of it is made in Scotland." Given Scotland's contribution of providing the nose cone for the aircraft, Benn replied, "it was also 'E' for 'Écosse' (the French name for Scotland) – and I might have added 'e' for extravagance and 'e' for escalation as well!"

In common usage in the United Kingdom, the type is known as "Concorde" without an article, rather than "the Concorde" or "a Concorde".

=== Sales efforts ===
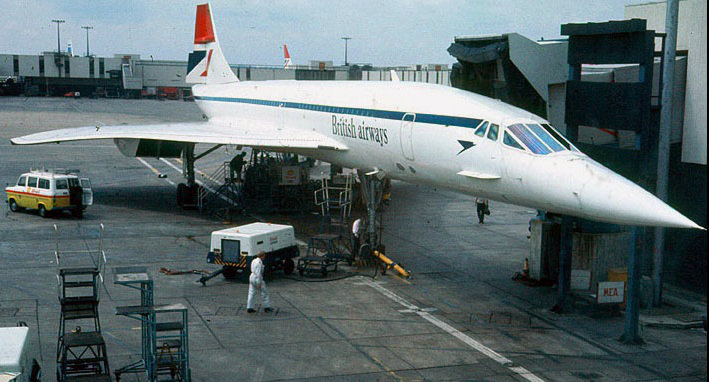
British Airways Concorde in early BA livery at London-Heathrow Airport in the early 1980s

Advertisements for Concorde during the late 1960s placed in publications such as Aviation Week & Space Technology predicted a market for 350 aircraft by 1980. The new consortium intended to produce one long-range and one short-range version, but prospective customers showed no interest in the short-range version, thus it was later dropped.

Concorde's costs spiralled during development to more than six times the original projections, arriving at a unit cost of £23 million in 1977 (equivalent to £135.13 million in 2025). Its sonic boom made travelling supersonically over land impossible without causing complaints from citizens. World events also dampened Concorde sales prospects; the 1973–74 stock market crash and the 1973 oil crisis had made airlines cautious about aircraft with high fuel consumption, and new wide-body aircraft, such as the Boeing 747, had recently made subsonic aircraft significantly more efficient and presented a low-risk option for airlines. While carrying a full load, Concorde achieved 15.8 passenger miles per gallon of fuel, while the Boeing 707 reached 33.3 pm/g, the Boeing 747 46.4 pm/g, and the McDonnell Douglas DC-10 53.6 pm/g. A trend in favour of cheaper airline tickets also caused airlines such as Qantas to question Concorde's market suitability. During the early 2000s, Flight International described Concorde as being "one of aerospace's most ambitious but commercially flawed projects".

The consortium received orders (non-binding options) for more than 100 of the long-range version from the major airlines of the day: Pan Am, BOAC, and Air France were the launch customers, with six aircraft each. Other airlines in the order book included Panair do Brasil, Continental Airlines, Japan Airlines, Lufthansa, American Airlines, United Airlines, Air India, Air Canada, Braniff, Singapore Airlines, Iran Air, Olympic Airways, Qantas, CAAC Airlines, Middle East Airlines, and TWA. At the time of the first flight, the options list contained 74 options from 16 airlines:

Airline	Number	Reserved	Cancelled	Remarks
Pan Am	6	3 June 1963	31 January 1973	2 extra options in 1964
Air France	6	3 June 1963		2 extra options in 1964
BOAC	6	3 June 1963		2 extra options in 1964
Continental Airlines	3	24 July 1963	March 1973	
American Airlines	4	7 October 1963	February 1973	2 extra options in 1965
TWA	4	16 October 1963	31 January 1973	2 extra options in 1965
Middle East Airlines	2	4 December 1963	February 1973	
Qantas	6	19 March 1964	June 1973	2 cancelled in May 1966
Air India	2	15 July 1964	February 1975	
Japan Airlines	3	30 September 1965	1973	
Sabena	2	1 December 1965	February 1973	
Eastern Airlines	2	28 June 1966	February 1973	2 extra options on 15 August 1966; 2 other extra options on 28 April 1967
United Airlines	6	29 June 1966	26 October 1972	
Braniff	3	1 September 1966	February 1973	
Lufthansa	3	16 February 1967	April 1973	
Air Canada	4	1 March 1967	6 June 1972	
CAAC	2	24 July 1972	December 1979	
Iran Air	2	8 October 1972	February 1980	

=== Testing ===
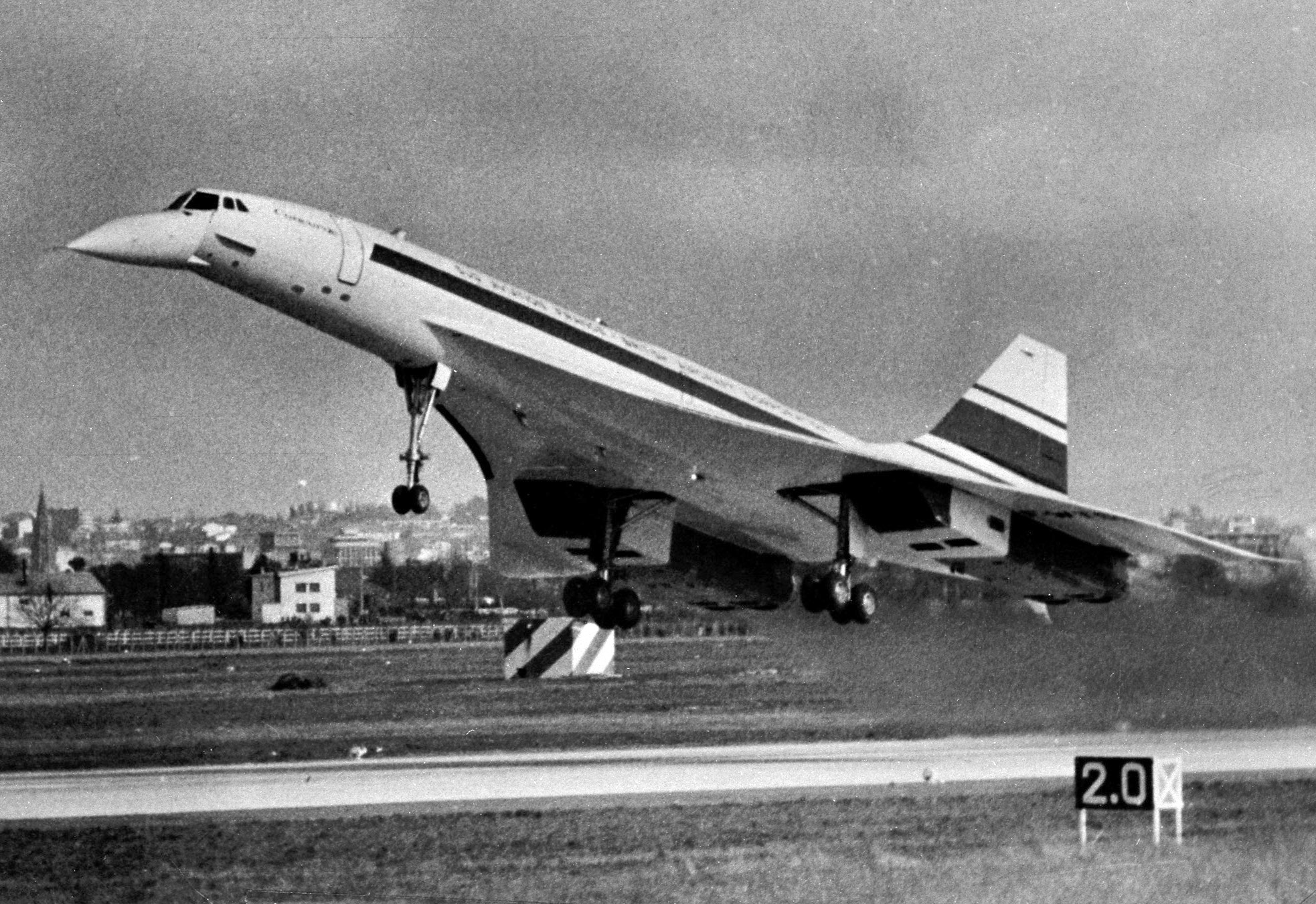
Concorde 001 first flight in 1969

The design work was supported by a research programme studying the flight characteristics of low ratio delta wings. A supersonic Fairey Delta 2 was modified to carry the ogee planform, and, renamed as the BAC 221, used for tests of the high-speed flight envelope; the Handley Page HP.115 also provided valuable information on low-speed performance.

Construction of two prototypes began in February 1965: 001, built by Aérospatiale at Toulouse, and 002, by BAC at Filton, Bristol. 001 made its first test flight from Toulouse on 2 March 1969, piloted by André Turcat, and first went supersonic on 1 October. The first UK-built Concorde flew from Filton to RAF Fairford on 9 April 1969, piloted by Brian Trubshaw. Both prototypes were presented to the public on 7–8 June 1969 at the Paris Air Show. As the flight programme progressed, 001 embarked on a sales and demonstration tour on 4 September 1971, which was also the first transatlantic crossing of Concorde. Concorde 002 followed on 2 June 1972 with a tour of the Middle and Far East. Concorde 002 made the first visit to the United States in 1973, landing at Dallas/Fort Worth Regional Airport to mark the airport's opening.

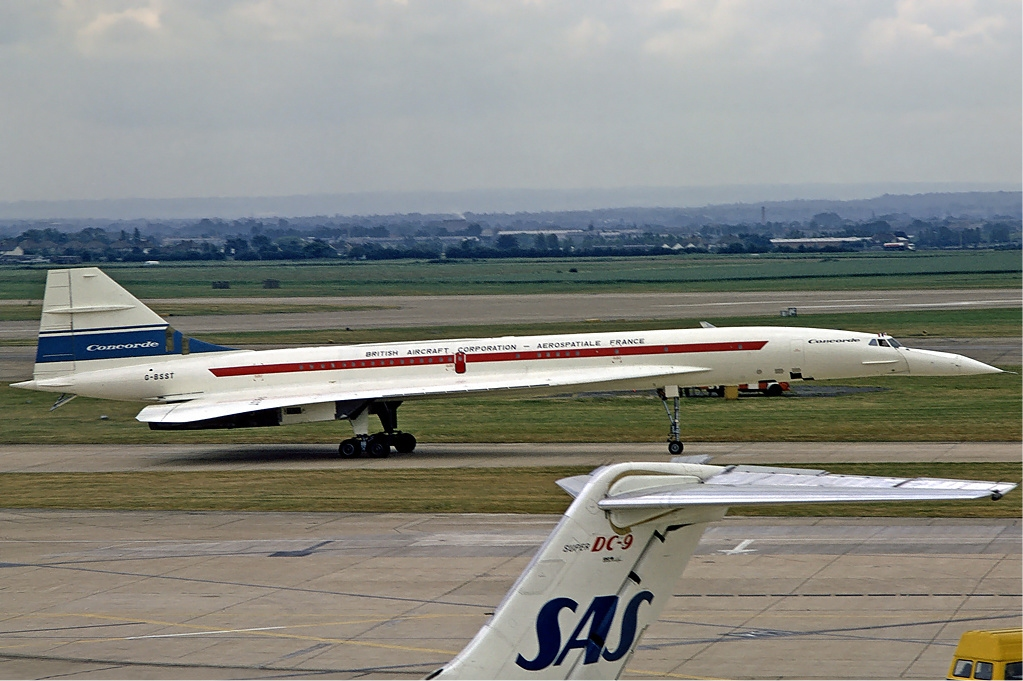
Concorde on early visit to Heathrow Airport on 1 July 1972

Concorde had initially held a great deal of customer interest, but the project was hit by order cancellations. The Paris Le Bourget air show crash of the competing Soviet Tupolev Tu-144 had shocked potential buyers, and public concern over the environmental issues of supersonic aircraft – the sonic boom, take-off noise and pollution – had produced a change in the public opinion of SSTs. By 1976 the remaining buyers were from four countries: Britain, France, China, and Iran. Only Air France and British Airways (the successor to BOAC) took up their orders, with the two governments taking a cut of any profits.

During a 26 March 1974 test flight a Concorde reached its maximum speed of 2,370 km/h (1,470 mph; 1,280 kn) (Mach 2.23) at an altitude of 19,415 m (63,700 ft). Concorde was originally designed for cruising speeds up to Mach 2.2, but its regular service speed was limited to Mach 2.02 to extend airframe life.

The US government cut federal funding for the Boeing 2707, its supersonic transport programme, in 1971; Boeing did not complete its two 2707 prototypes. The US, India, and Malaysia all ruled out Concorde supersonic flights over the noise concern, although some of these restrictions were later relaxed. Professor Douglas Ross characterised restrictions placed upon Concorde operations by President Jimmy Carter's administration as having been an act of protectionism of American aircraft manufacturers.

=== Programme cost ===
The original programme cost estimate was £70 million in 1962, (£1.77 billion in 2024). After cost overruns and delays the programme eventually cost between £1.5 and £2.1 billion in 1976, (£11.9 billion – 16.7 billion in 2024). This cost was the main reason the production run was much smaller than expected.

== Design ==
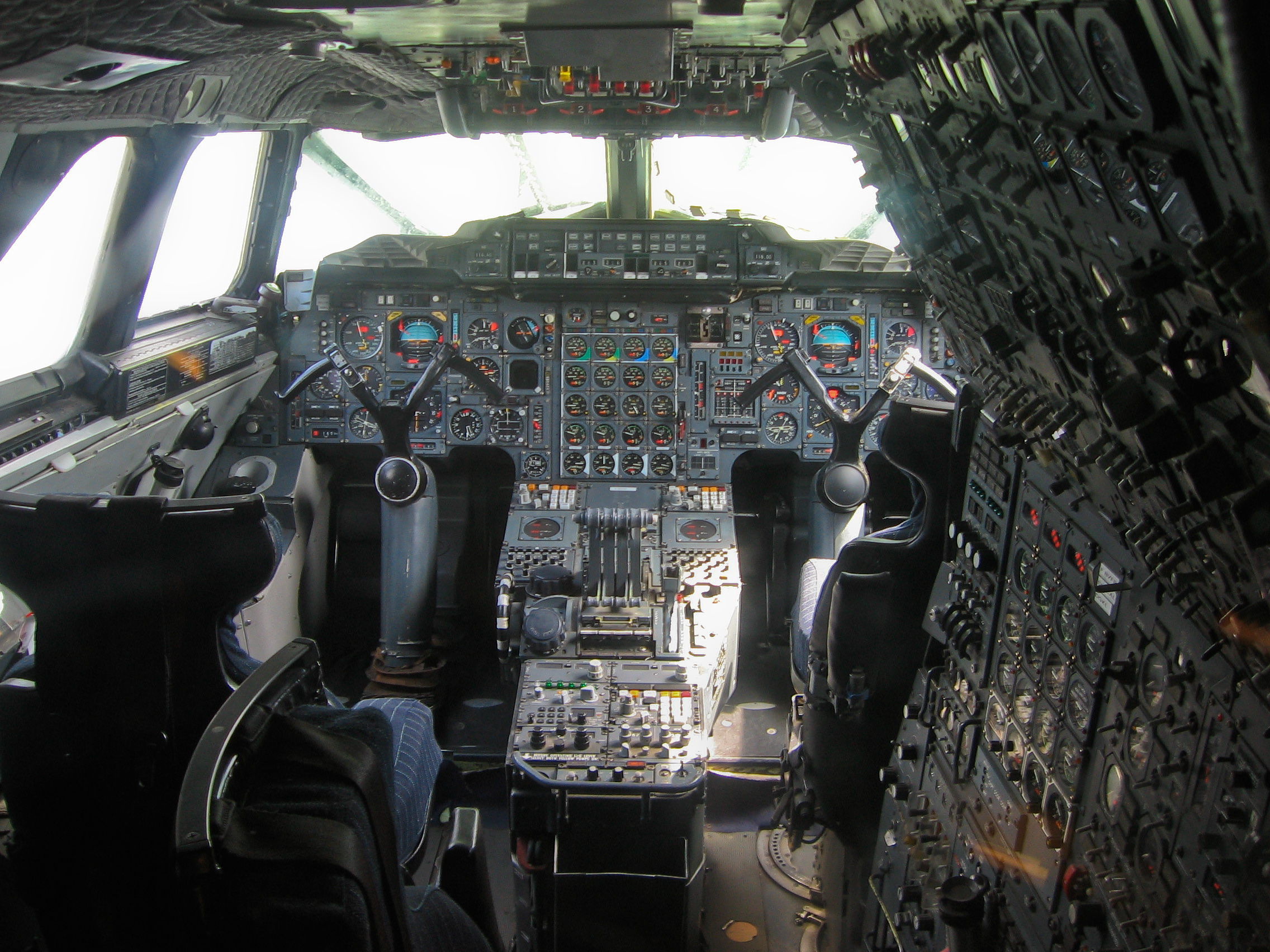
Concorde flight deck layout

=== General features ===
Concorde is an ogival delta winged aircraft with four Olympus engines based on those employed in the RAF's Avro Vulcan strategic bomber. It has an unusual tailless configuration for a commercial aircraft, as does the Tupolev Tu-144. Concorde was the first airliner to have a fly-by-wire flight-control system (in this case, analogue); the avionics system Concorde used was unique because it was the first commercial aircraft to employ hybrid circuits. The principal designer for the project was Pierre Satre, with Sir Archibald Russell as his deputy.

Concorde pioneered the following technologies:

For high speed and optimisation of flight:

- Double delta (ogee/ogival) shaped wings
- Variable engine air intake ramp system controlled by digital computers
- Supercruise capability

For weight-saving and enhanced performance:

- Mach 2.02 (~2,154 km/h or 1,338 mph) cruising speed for optimum fuel consumption (supersonic drag minimum and turbojet engines are more efficient at higher speed); fuel consumption at Mach 2 (2,120 km/h; 1,320 mph) and at altitude of 60,000 feet (18,000 m) was 4,800 US gallons per hour (18,000 L/h).
- Mainly aluminium construction using a high-temperature alloy similar to that developed for aero-engine pistons. This material gave low weight and allowed conventional manufacture (higher speeds would have ruled out aluminium)
- Full-regime autopilot and autothrottle allowing "hands off" control of the aircraft from climb out to landing
- Fully electrically controlled analogue fly-by-wire flight controls systems
- High-pressure hydraulic system using 28 MPa (4,100 psi) for lighter hydraulic components.
- Air data computer (ADC) for the automated monitoring and transmission of aerodynamic measurements (total pressure, static pressure, angle of attack, side-slip).
- Fully electrically controlled analogue brake-by-wire system
- No auxiliary power unit, as Concorde would visit only large airports where ground air start carts were available.

=== Powerplant ===
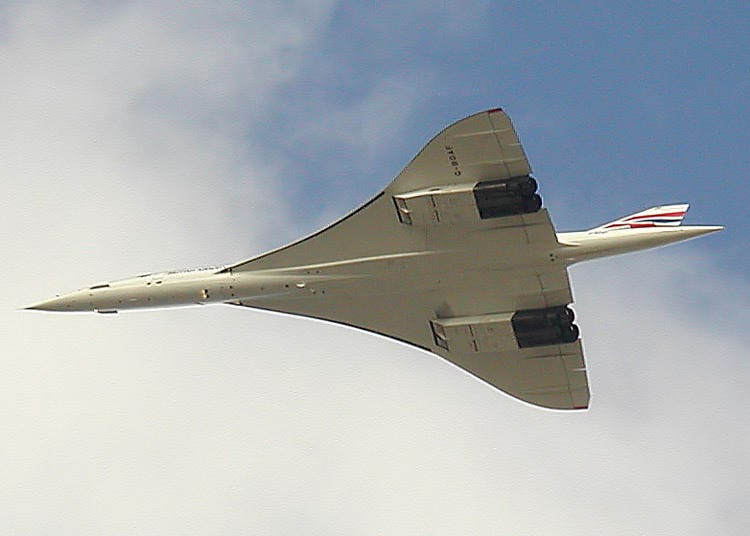
The four powerplants mounted in two nacelles under the wings

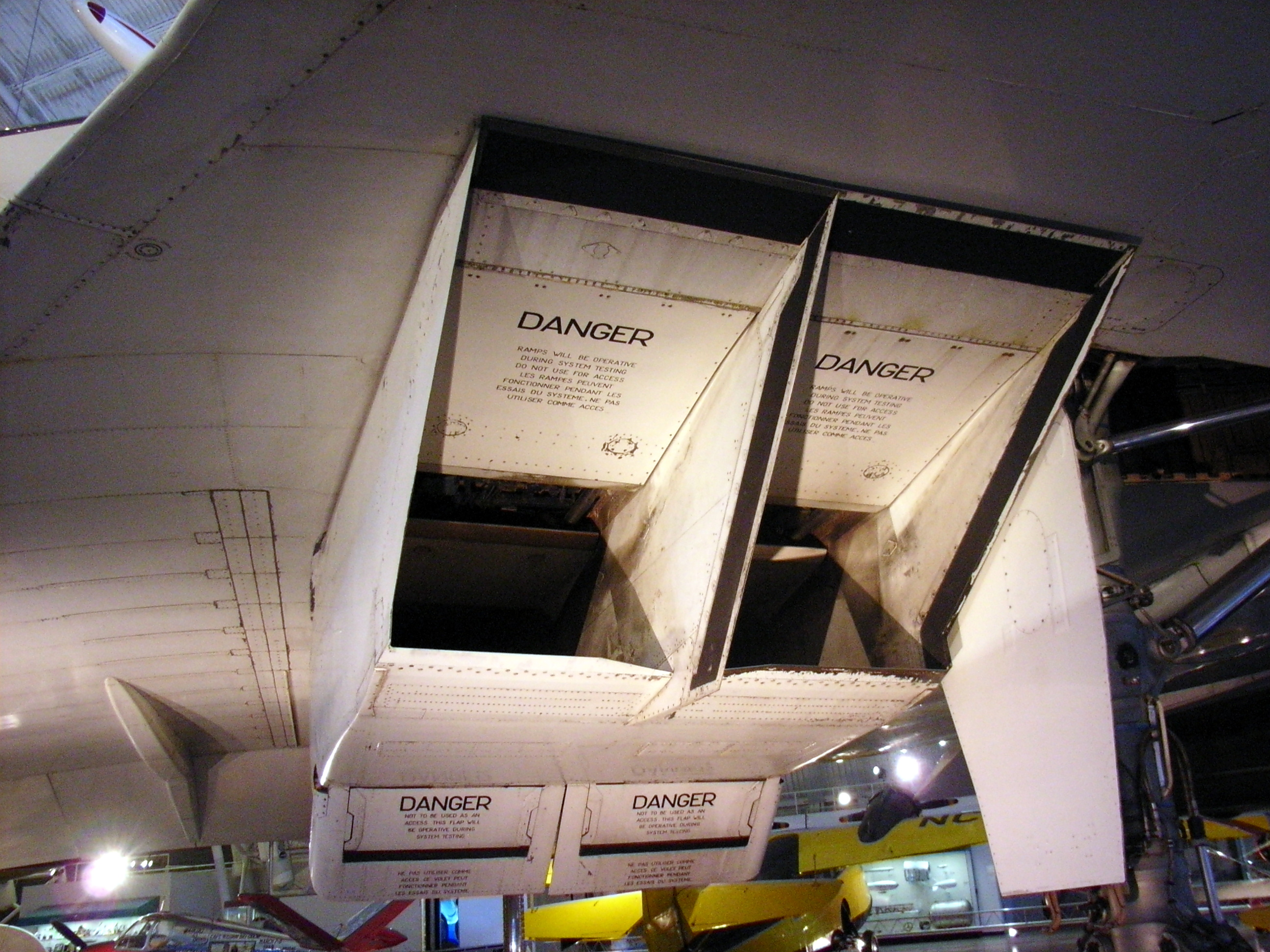
Twin air intake assembly for each nacelle

Concorde's intake ramp system schematics

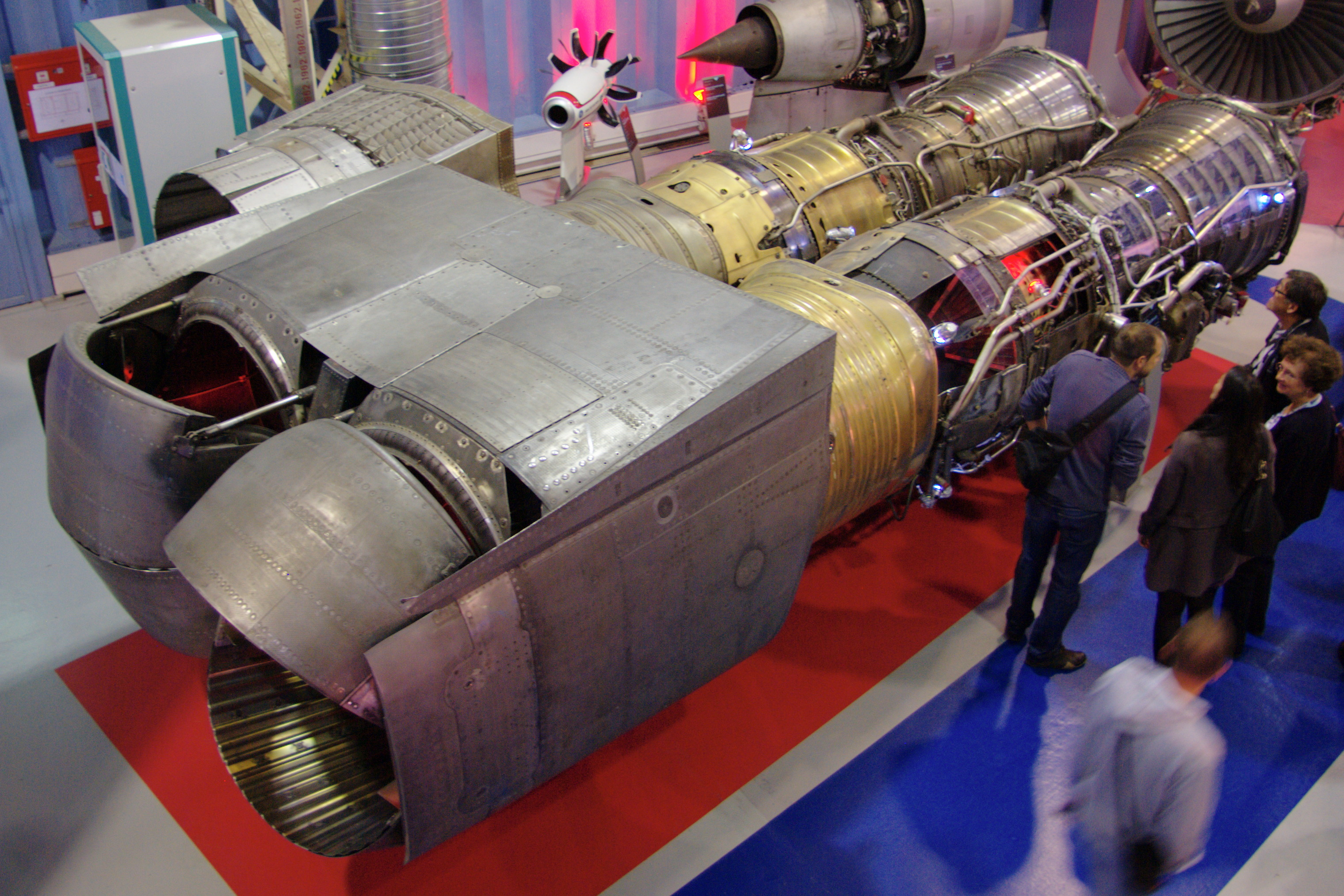
Engines and twin exhaust system for each nacelle

A symposium titled "Supersonic-Transport Implications" was hosted by the Royal Aeronautical Society on 8 December 1960. Various views were put forward on the likely type of powerplant for a supersonic transport, such as podded or buried installation and turbojet or ducted-fan engines. Concorde needed to fly long distances to be economically viable; this required high efficiency from the powerplant. Turbofan engines were rejected owing to their larger cross-section producing excessive drag (but would be studied for future SSTs). Olympus turbojet technology was already available for development to meet the design requirements. Rolls-Royce proposed developing the RB.169 to power Concorde during its initial design phase, but developing a wholly-new engine for a single aircraft would have been extremely costly, so the existing BSEL Olympus Mk 320 turbojet engine, which was already flying in the BAC TSR-2 supersonic strike bomber prototype, was chosen instead.

Boundary layer management in the podded installation was put forward as simpler with only an inlet cone; however, Dr. Seddon of the RAE favoured a more integrated buried installation. One concern of placing two or more engines behind a single intake was that an intake failure could lead to a double or triple engine failure. While a ducted fan over the turbojet would reduce noise, its larger cross-section also incurred more drag. Acoustics specialists were confident that a turbojet's noise could be reduced and SNECMA made advances in silencer design during the programme. The Olympus Mk.622 with reduced jet velocity was proposed to reduce the noise but was not pursued. By 1974, the spade silencers which projected into the exhaust were reported to be ineffective but "entry-into-service aircraft are likely to meet their noise guarantees".

The powerplant configuration selected for Concorde highlighted airfield noise, boundary layer management and interactions between adjacent engines and the requirement that the powerplant, at Mach 2, tolerate pushovers, sideslips, pull-ups and throttle slamming without surging. Extensive development testing with design changes and changes to intake and engine control laws addressed most of the issues except airfield noise and the interaction between adjacent powerplants at speeds above Mach 1.6 which meant Concorde "had to be certified aerodynamically as a twin-engined aircraft above Mach 1.6".

Situated behind the wing leading edge, the engine intake had a wing boundary layer ahead of it. Two-thirds were diverted and the remaining third which entered the intake did not adversely affect the intake efficiency except during pushovers when the boundary layer thickened and caused surging. Wind tunnel testing helped define leading-edge modifications ahead of the intakes which solved the problem. Each engine had its own intake and the nacelles were paired with a splitter plate between them to minimise the chance of one powerplant influencing the other. Only above Mach 1.6 (1,960 km/h; 1,220 mph) was an engine surge likely to affect the adjacent engine.

The air intake design for Concorde's engines was especially critical. The intakes had to slow down supersonic inlet air to subsonic speeds with high-pressure recovery to ensure efficient operation at cruising speed while providing low distortion levels (to prevent engine surge) and maintaining high efficiency for all likely ambient temperatures in cruise. They had to provide adequate subsonic performance for diversion cruise and low engine-face distortion at take-off. They also had to provide an alternative path for excess intake of air during engine throttling or shutdowns. The variable intake features required to meet all these requirements consisted of front and rear ramps, a dump door, an auxiliary inlet and a ramp bleed to the exhaust nozzle.

As well as supplying air to the engine, the intake also supplied air through the ramp bleed to the propelling nozzle. The nozzle ejector (or aerodynamic) design, with variable exit area and secondary flow from the intake, contributed to good expansion efficiency from take-off to cruise. Concorde's Air Intake Control Units (AICUs) made use of a digital processor for intake control. It was the first use of a digital processor with full authority control of an essential system in a passenger aircraft. It was developed by BAC's Electronics and Space Systems division after the analogue AICUs (developed by Ultra Electronics) fitted to the prototype aircraft were found to lack sufficient accuracy. Ultra Electronics also developed Concorde's thrust-by-wire engine control system.

Engine failure causes problems on conventional subsonic aircraft; not only does the aircraft lose thrust on that side but the engine creates drag, causing the aircraft to yaw and bank in the direction of the failed engine. If this had happened to Concorde at supersonic speeds, it theoretically could have caused a catastrophic failure of the airframe. Although computer simulations predicted considerable problems, in practice Concorde could shut down both engines on the same side of the aircraft at Mach 2 without difficulties. During an engine failure the required air intake is virtually zero. So, on Concorde, engine failure was countered by the opening of the auxiliary spill door and the full extension of the ramps, which deflected the air downwards past the engine, gaining lift and minimising drag. Concorde pilots were routinely trained to handle double-engine failure. Concorde used reheat (afterburners) only at take-off and to pass through the transonic speed range, between Mach 0.95 and 1.7.

=== Heating problems ===
Kinetic heating from the high speed boundary layer caused the skin to heat up during supersonic flight. Every surface, such as windows and panels, was warm to the touch by the end of the flight. Apart from the engine bay, the hottest part of any supersonic aircraft's structure is the nose, owing to aerodynamic heating. Hiduminium R.R. 58, an aluminium alloy, was used throughout the aircraft because it was relatively cheap and easy to work with. The highest temperature it could sustain over the life of the aircraft was 127 °C (261 °F), which limited the top speed to Mach 2.02. Concorde went through two cycles of cooling and heating during a flight, first cooling down as it gained altitude at subsonic speed, then heating up accelerating to cruise speed, finally cooling again when descending and slowing down before heating again in low altitude air before landing. This had to be factored into the metallurgical and fatigue modelling. A test rig was built that repeatedly heated up a full-size section of the wing, and then cooled it, and periodically samples of metal were taken for testing. The airframe was designed for a life of 45,000 flying hours.

Concorde skin temperatures. They depended on the balance of heat transfer from the boundary layer, heat picked up from solar radiation, heat radiated back from the surface to the atmosphere, and heat transferred to the internal structure.

As the fuselage heated up it expanded by as much as 300 mm (12 in). The most obvious manifestation of this was a gap that opened up on the flight deck between the flight engineer's console and the bulkhead. On some aircraft that conducted a retiring supersonic flight, the flight engineers placed their caps in this expanded gap, wedging the cap when the airframe shrank again. To keep the cabin cool, Concorde used the fuel as a heat sink for the heat from the air conditioning. The same method also cooled the hydraulics. During supersonic flight a visor was used to keep high temperature air from flowing over the cockpit skin.

Concorde had livery restrictions; the majority of the surface had to be covered with a highly reflective white paint to avoid overheating the aluminium structure owing to heating effects. The white finish reduced the skin temperature by 6 to 11 °C (11 to 20 °F).

=== Structural issues ===
Fuel pitch trim

Owing to its high speeds, large forces were applied to the aircraft during turns, causing distortion of the aircraft's structure. There were concerns over maintaining precise control at supersonic speeds. Both of these issues were resolved by ratio changes between the inboard and outboard elevon deflections, varying at differing speeds including supersonic. Only the innermost elevons, attached to the stiffest area of the wings, were used at higher speeds. The narrow fuselage flexed, which was apparent to rear passengers looking along the length of the cabin.

When any aircraft passes the critical mach of its airframe, the centre of pressure shifts rearwards. This causes a pitch-down moment on the aircraft if the centre of gravity remains where it was. The wings were designed to reduce this, but there was still a shift of about 2 metres (6 ft 7 in). This could have been countered by the use of trim controls, but at such high speeds, this would have increased drag which would have been unacceptable. Instead, the distribution of fuel along the aircraft was shifted during acceleration and deceleration to move the centre of gravity, effectively acting as an auxiliary trim control.

=== Range ===
To fly non-stop across the Atlantic Ocean, Concorde required the greatest supersonic range of any aircraft. This was achieved by a combination of powerplants which were efficient at twice the speed of sound, a slender fuselage with high fineness ratio, and a complex wing shape for a high lift-to-drag ratio. Only a modest payload could be carried and the aircraft was trimmed without using deflected control surfaces, to avoid the drag that would incur.

Nevertheless, soon after Concorde began flying, a Concorde "B" model was designed with slightly larger fuel capacity and slightly larger wings with leading edge slats to improve aerodynamic performance at all speeds, with the objective of expanding the range to reach markets in new regions. It would have higher thrust engines with noise reducing features and no environmentally objectionable afterburner. Preliminary design studies showed that an engine with a 25% gain in efficiency over the Rolls-Royce/Snecma Olympus 593 could be produced. This would have given 500 mi (805 km) additional range and a greater payload, making new commercial routes possible. This was cancelled due in part to poor sales of Concorde, but also to the rising cost of aviation fuel in the 1970s.

=== Radiation concerns ===
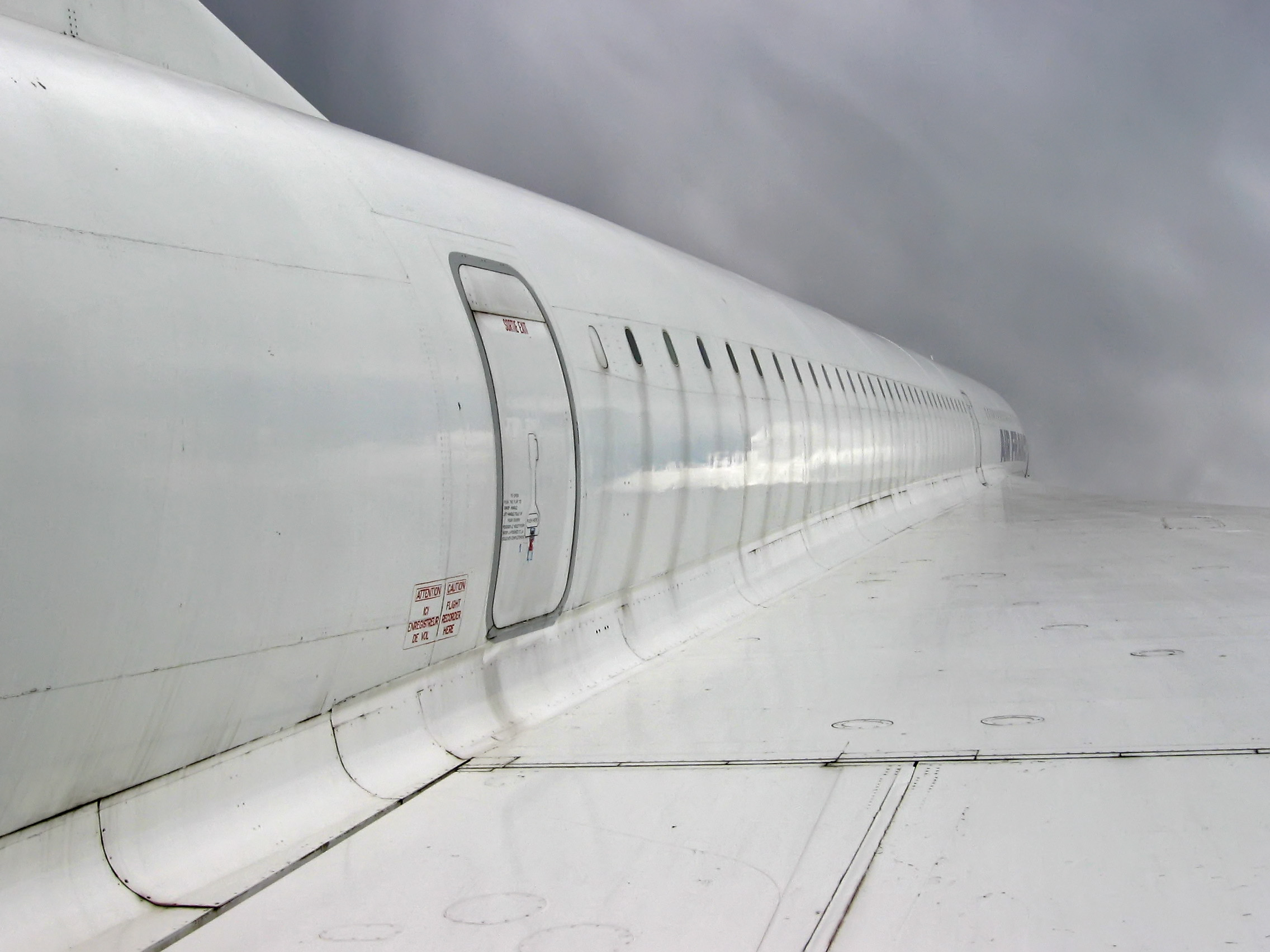
External view of Concorde's fuselage

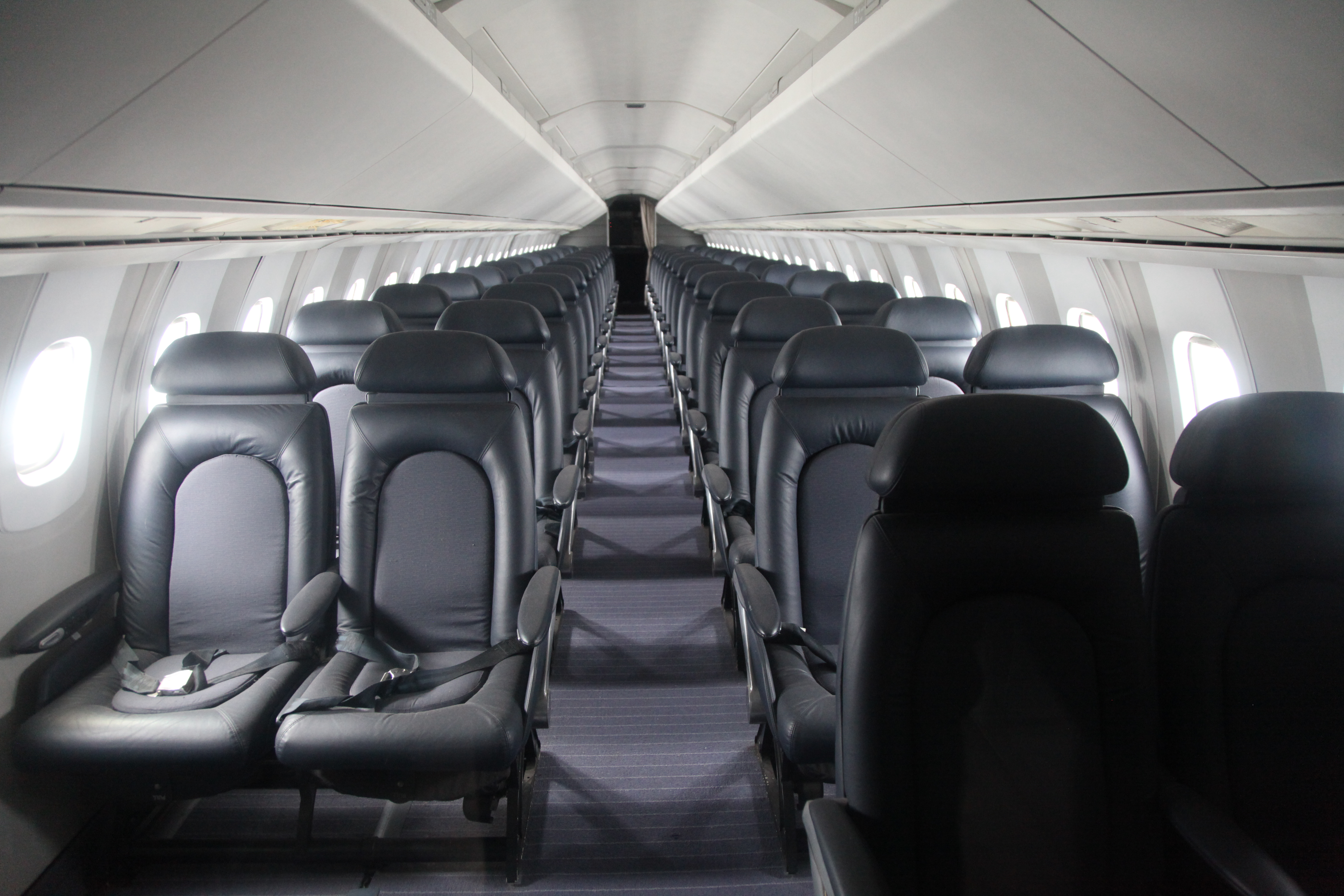
British Airways Concorde interior, after refurbishment during time out of service following the 2000 Air France Concorde crash. The narrow fuselage permitted only a 4-abreast seating with limited headroom.

Concorde's high cruising altitude meant occupants received almost twice the flux of extraterrestrial ionising radiation as those travelling on a conventional long-haul flight. Upon Concorde's introduction, it was speculated that this exposure during supersonic travels would increase the likelihood of skin cancer. Owing to the proportionally reduced flight time, the overall equivalent dose would normally be less than a conventional flight over the same distance. Unusual solar activity might lead to an increase in incident radiation. To prevent incidents of excessive radiation exposure, the flight deck had a radiometer and an instrument to measure the rate of increase or decrease of radiation. If the radiation level became too high, Concorde would descend below 47,000 feet (14,000 m).

=== Cabin pressurisation ===
Airliner cabins were usually maintained at a pressure equivalent to 6,000–8,000 feet (1,800–2,400 m) elevation. Concorde's pressurisation was set to an altitude at the lower end of this range, 6,000 feet (1,800 m). Concorde's maximum cruising altitude was 60,000 feet (18,000 m); subsonic airliners typically cruise below 44,000 feet (13,000 m).

A sudden reduction in cabin pressure is hazardous to all passengers and crew. Above 50,000 feet (15,000 m), a sudden cabin depressurisation would leave a "time of useful consciousness" up to 10–15 seconds for a conditioned athlete. At Concorde's altitude, the air density is very low; a breach of cabin integrity would result in a loss of pressure severe enough that the plastic emergency oxygen masks installed on other passenger jets would not be effective and passengers would soon suffer from hypoxia despite quickly donning them. Concorde was equipped with smaller windows to reduce the rate of loss in the event of a breach, a reserve air supply system to augment cabin air pressure, and a rapid descent procedure to bring the aircraft to a safe altitude. The FAA enforces minimum emergency descent rates for aircraft and noting Concorde's higher operating altitude, concluded that the best response to pressure loss would be a rapid descent. Continuous positive airway pressure would have delivered pressurised oxygen directly to the pilots through masks.

=== Flight characteristics ===
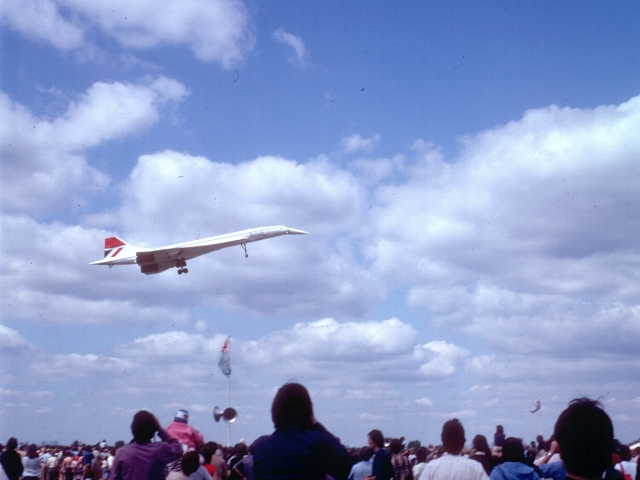
Concorde performing a low-level fly-by at an air show in 1981

While subsonic commercial jets took eight hours to fly from Paris to New York (seven hours from New York to Paris), the average supersonic flight time on the transatlantic routes was just under 3.5 hours. Concorde had a maximum cruising altitude of 18,300 metres (60,000 ft) and an average cruise speed of Mach 2.02 (2,150 km/h; 1,330 mph), more than twice the speed of conventional aircraft.

With no other civil traffic operating at its cruising altitude of about 56,000 ft (17,000 m), Concorde had exclusive use of dedicated oceanic airways, or "tracks", separate from the North Atlantic Tracks, the routes used by other aircraft to cross the Atlantic. Owing to the significantly less variable nature of high altitude winds compared to those at standard cruising altitudes, these dedicated SST tracks had fixed co-ordinates, unlike the standard routes at lower altitudes, whose co-ordinates are replotted twice daily based on forecast weather patterns (jetstreams). Concorde would also be cleared in a 15,000-foot (4,570 m) block, allowing for a slow climb from 45,000 to 60,000 ft (14,000 to 18,000 m) during the oceanic crossing as the fuel load gradually decreased. In regular service, Concorde employed an efficient cruise-climb flight profile following take-off.

The delta-shaped wings required Concorde to adopt a higher angle of attack at low speeds than conventional aircraft, but it allowed the formation of large low-pressure vortices over the entire upper wing surface, maintaining lift. The normal landing speed was 170 miles per hour (274 km/h). Because of this high angle, during a landing approach Concorde was on the backside of the drag force curve, where raising the nose would increase the rate of descent; the aircraft was thus largely flown on the throttle and was fitted with an autothrottle to reduce the pilot's workload.

The only thing that tells you that you're moving is that occasionally when you're flying over the subsonic aeroplanes you can see all these 747s 20,000 feet below you almost appearing to go backwards, I mean you are going 800 miles an hour or thereabouts faster than they are. The aeroplane was an absolute delight to fly; it handled beautifully. And remember we are talking about an aeroplane that was being designed in the late 1950s – mid-1960s. I think it's absolutely amazing and here we are, now in the 21st century, and it remains unique.

— John Hutchinson, Concorde Captain, "The World's Greatest Airliner" (2003)

=== Brakes and undercarriage ===
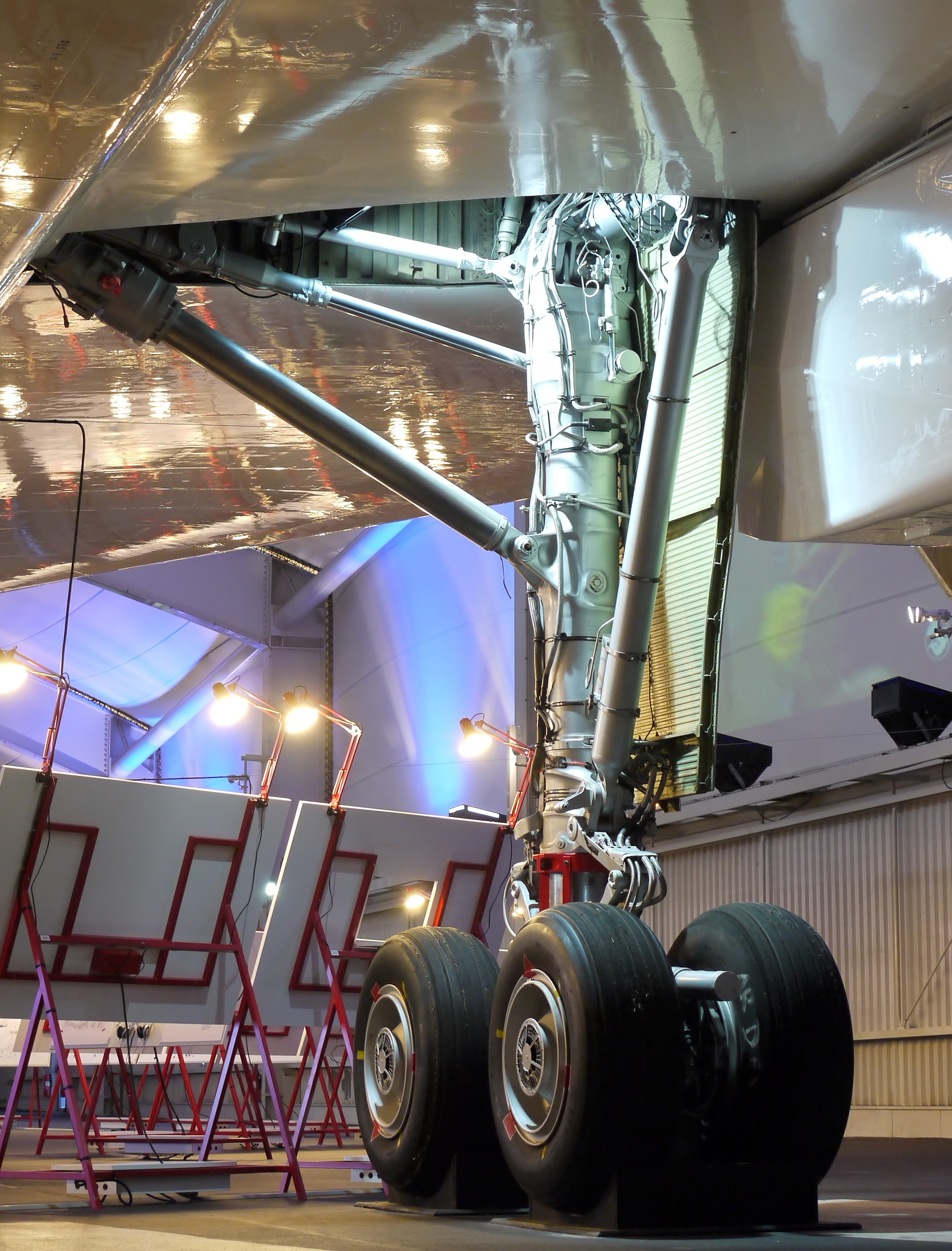
Concorde main undercarriage

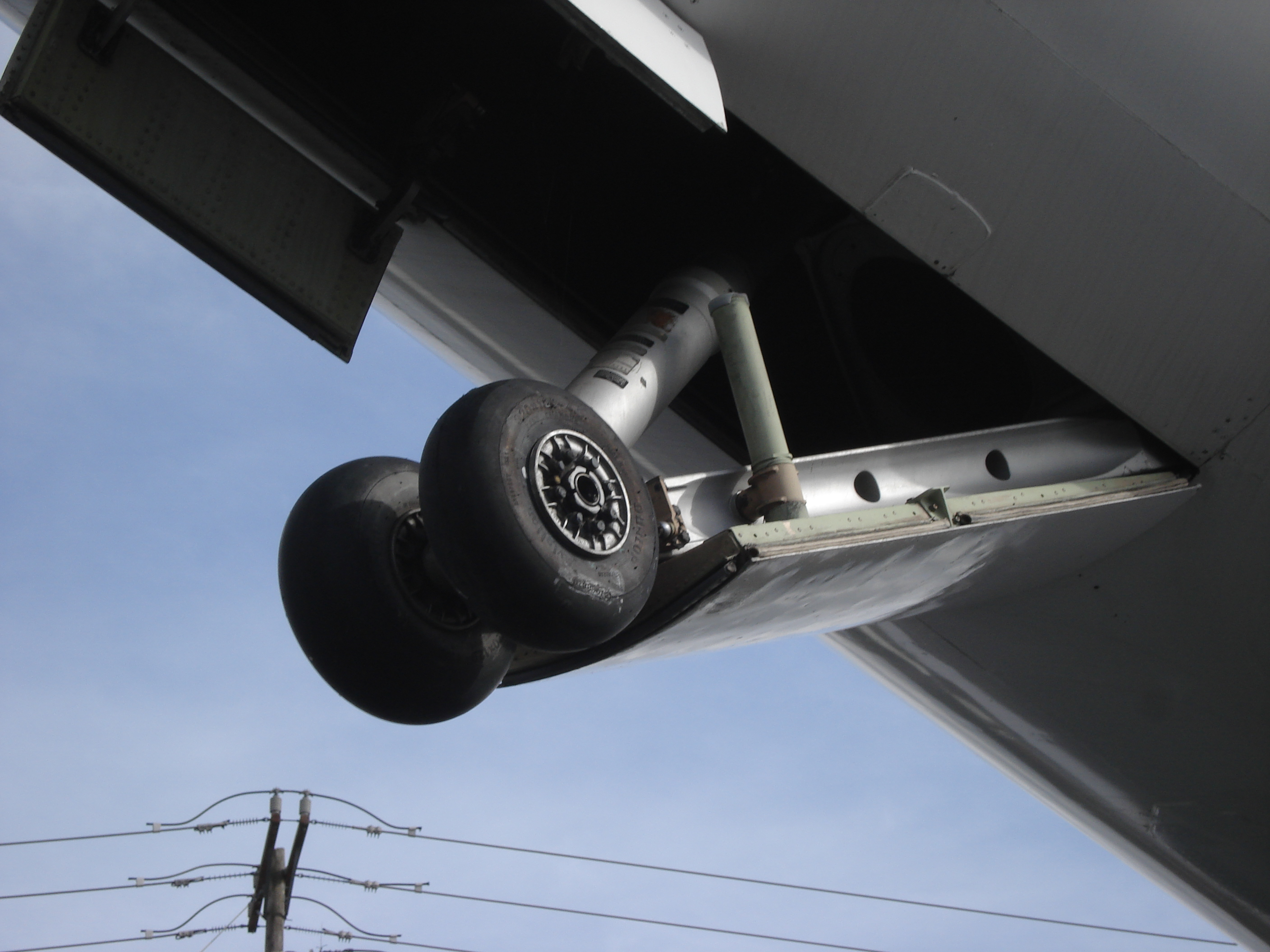
Tail bumper of Concorde G-BOAG at the Museum of Flight in Seattle

Because of the way Concorde's delta-wing generated lift, the undercarriage had to be unusually strong and tall to allow for the angle of attack at low speed. At rotation, Concorde would rise to a high angle of attack, about 18 degrees. Prior to rotation, the wing generated almost no lift, unlike typical aircraft wings. Combined with the high airspeed at rotation (199 knots or 369 kilometres per hour or 229 miles per hour indicated airspeed), this increased the stresses on the main undercarriage in a way that was initially unexpected during the development and required a major redesign. Owing to the high angle needed at rotation, a small set of wheels was added aft to prevent tailstrikes. The main undercarriage units swing towards each other to be stowed but owing to their great height also needed to contract in length telescopically before swinging to clear each other when stowed.

The four main wheel tyres on each bogie unit are inflated to 232 psi (1,600 kPa). The twin-wheel nose undercarriage retracts forwards and its tyres are inflated to a pressure of 191 psi (1,320 kPa), and the wheel assembly carries a spray deflector to prevent standing water from being thrown up into the engine intakes. The tyres are rated to a maximum speed on the runway of 250 mph (400 km/h).

The high take-off speed of 250 miles per hour (400 km/h) required Concorde to have upgraded brakes. Like most airliners, Concorde has anti-skid braking to prevent the tyres from losing traction when the brakes are applied. The brakes, developed by Dunlop, were the first carbon-based brakes used on an airliner. The use of carbon over equivalent steel brakes provided a weight-saving of 1,200 lb (540 kg). Each wheel has multiple discs which are cooled by electric fans. Wheel sensors include brake overload, brake temperature, and tyre deflation. After a typical landing at Heathrow, brake temperatures were around 300–400 °C (570–750 °F). Landing Concorde required a minimum of 6,000 feet (1,800 m) runway length; the shortest runway Concorde ever landed on carrying commercial passengers was Cardiff Airport. Concorde G-AXDN (101) made its final landing at Duxford Aerodrome on 20 August 1977, which had a runway length of just 6,000 feet (1,800 m) at the time. This was the last aircraft to land at Duxford before the runway was shortened later that year.

=== Droop nose ===
Concorde's drooping nose, developed by Marshall's of Cambridge, enabled the aircraft to switch from being streamlined to reduce drag and achieve optimal aerodynamic efficiency during flight, to not obstructing the pilot's view during taxi, take-off, and landing operations. Owing to the high angle of attack, the long pointed nose obstructed the view and necessitated the ability to droop. The droop nose was accompanied by a moving visor that retracted into the nose prior to being lowered. When the nose was raised to horizontal, the visor would rise in front of the cockpit windscreen for aerodynamic streamlining.

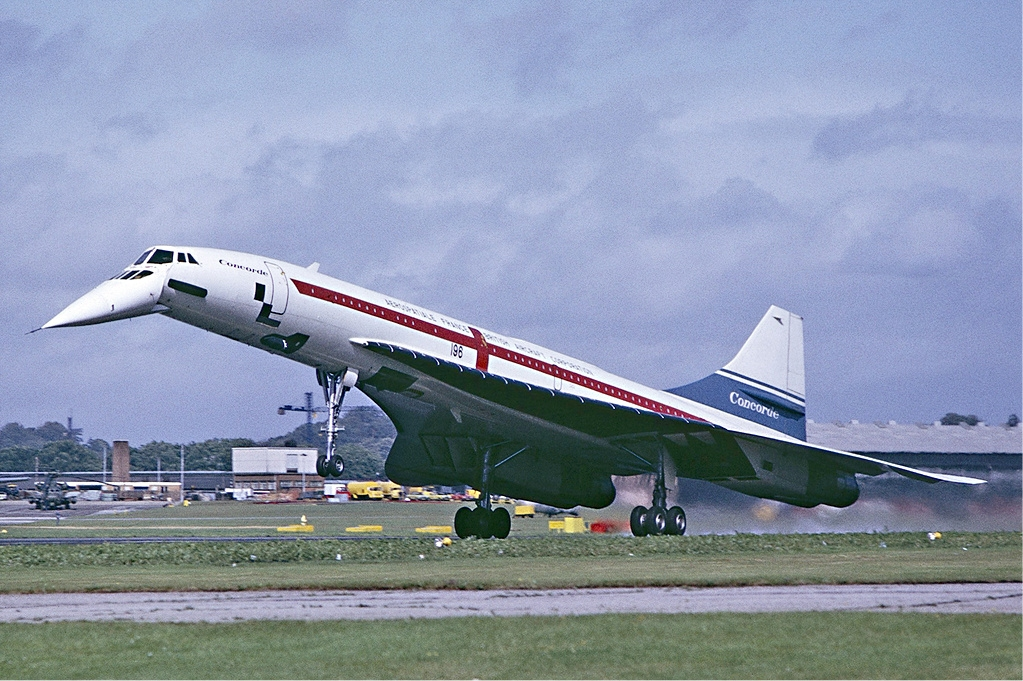
Concorde landing at Farnborough in 1974, with droop nose lowered

A controller in the cockpit allowed the visor to be retracted and the nose to be lowered to 5° below the standard horizontal position for taxiing and take-off. Following take-off and after clearing the airport, the nose and visor were raised. Prior to landing, the visor was again retracted and the nose lowered to 12.5° below horizontal for maximal visibility. Upon landing, the nose was raised to the 5° position to avoid the possibility of damage owing to collision with ground vehicles, and then raised fully before engine shutdown to prevent pooling of internal condensation within the radome seeping down into the aircraft's pitot/ADC system probes.

The US Federal Aviation Administration had objected to the restrictive visibility of the visor used on the first two prototype Concordes, which had been designed before a suitable high-temperature window glass had become available, and thus requiring alteration before the FAA would permit Concorde to serve US airports. This led to the redesigned visor used in the production and the four pre-production aircraft (101, 102, 201, and 202). The nose window and visor glass, needed to endure temperatures in excess of 100 °C (210 °F) at supersonic flight, were developed by Triplex.

== Operational history ==
=== First flights and routes flown ===
Concorde began scheduled flights with British Airways and Air France on 21 January 1976.

Concorde operated on various routes, including London–Bahrain, London–New York City, London–Miami, and London–Barbados (with British Airways), and Paris–Dakar–Rio de Janeiro, Paris–Azores–Caracas, Paris–New York, and Paris–Washington, D.C. (with Air France), but faced challenges such as noise-related bans and low profitability. Later, British Airways repositioned Concorde as a super-premium service and it then became profitable.

=== Retirement ===
In 2003, Air France and British Airways announced the retirement of Concorde, owing to rising maintenance costs, low passenger numbers following the 25 July 2000 crash, and the slump in air travel following the September 11 attacks.

Air France flew its last commercial flight on 30 May 2003 with British Airways retiring its Concorde fleet on 24 October 2003.

=== Operators ===
- Air France
- British Airways
- Braniff International Airways operated Concordes at subsonic speed between Dulles International Airport and Dallas Fort Worth International Airport, from January 1979 until May 1980, using its own flight and cabin crew, under its own insurance and operator's licence. Stickers containing a US registration were placed over the French and British registrations of the aircraft during each rotation, and a placard was temporarily placed behind the cockpit to signify the operator and operator's licence in command.
- Singapore Airlines had its livery placed on the left side of Concorde G-BOAD, and held a joint marketing agreement which saw Singapore insignias on the cabin fittings, as well as the airline's "Singapore Girl" stewardesses jointly sharing cabin duty with British Airways flight attendants. All flight crew, operations, and insurances remained solely under British Airways, however, and at no point did Singapore Airlines operate Concorde services under its own operator's certification, nor wet-lease an aircraft. This arrangement initially lasted for only three flights, conducted between 9–13 December 1977; it later resumed on 24 January 1979, and operated until 1 November 1980. The Singapore livery was used on G-BOAD from 1977 to 1980.

== Accidents and incidents ==
=== Air France Flight 4590 accident and grounding ===
On 25 July 2000, Air France Flight 4590, registration F-BTSC, crashed in Gonesse, France, after departing from Charles de Gaulle Airport en route to John F. Kennedy International Airport in New York City, killing all 100 passengers and nine crew members on board as well as four people on the ground. It was the only fatal accident involving Concorde. This crash also damaged Concorde's reputation and caused both British Airways and Air France to temporarily ground their fleets. According to the official investigation conducted by the Bureau of Enquiry and Analysis for Civil Aviation Safety (BEA), the crash was caused by a metallic strip that had fallen from a Continental Airlines DC-10 that had taken off minutes earlier. This fragment punctured a tyre on Concorde's left main wheel bogie during take-off. The tyre exploded, and a piece of rubber hit the fuel tank, which caused a fuel leak and led to a fire. The crew shut down engine number 2 in response to a fire warning, and with engine number 1 surging and producing little power, the aircraft was unable to gain altitude or speed. The aircraft entered a rapid pitch-up then a sudden descent, rolling left and crashing tail-low into the Hôtelissimo Les Relais Bleus Hotel in Gonesse.

The official findings have been contested by independent investigators and former BA Chief Concorde Pilot Mike Bannister, who argue the crash was the result of an "accident chain" of maintenance and operational errors. Evidence presented by the British team indicated that a critical spacer sleeve was omitted from the left main landing gear during maintenance, causing the bogie to become misaligned and the aircraft to veer toward the runway edge before striking the debris. Bannister further alleged the aircraft was over its maximum structural takeoff weight and that the flight crew prematurely shut down engine number 2 while at a critically low altitude, violating standard operating procedures. Although a French court initially found Continental Airlines criminally liable in 2010, an appeals court overturned the criminal convictions in 2012, while maintaining the civil ruling that left Continental liable for the compensation claims.

Before the accident, Concorde had been arguably the safest operational passenger airliner in the world with zero passenger deaths, but there had been two prior non-fatal accidents and a rate of tyre damage 30 times higher than subsonic airliners from 1995 to 2000. Safety improvements made after the crash included more secure electrical controls, Kevlar lining on the fuel tanks and specially developed burst-resistant tyres. The first flight with the modifications departed from London Heathrow on 17 July 2001, piloted by Bannister. In a flight of 3 hours 20 minutes over the mid-Atlantic towards Iceland, Bannister attained Mach 2.02 and 60,000 ft (18,000 m) then returned to RAF Brize Norton. The test flight was declared a success and was watched on live TV and by crowds on the ground at both locations. The first flight with passengers after the 2000 grounding landed shortly before the World Trade Center attacks in the United States. This was not a commercial flight; all the passengers were BA employees. Normal commercial operations resumed on 7 November 2001 by BA and AF (aircraft G-BOAE and F-BTSD), with service to New York JFK, where Mayor Rudy Giuliani greeted the passengers.

=== Other accidents and incidents ===
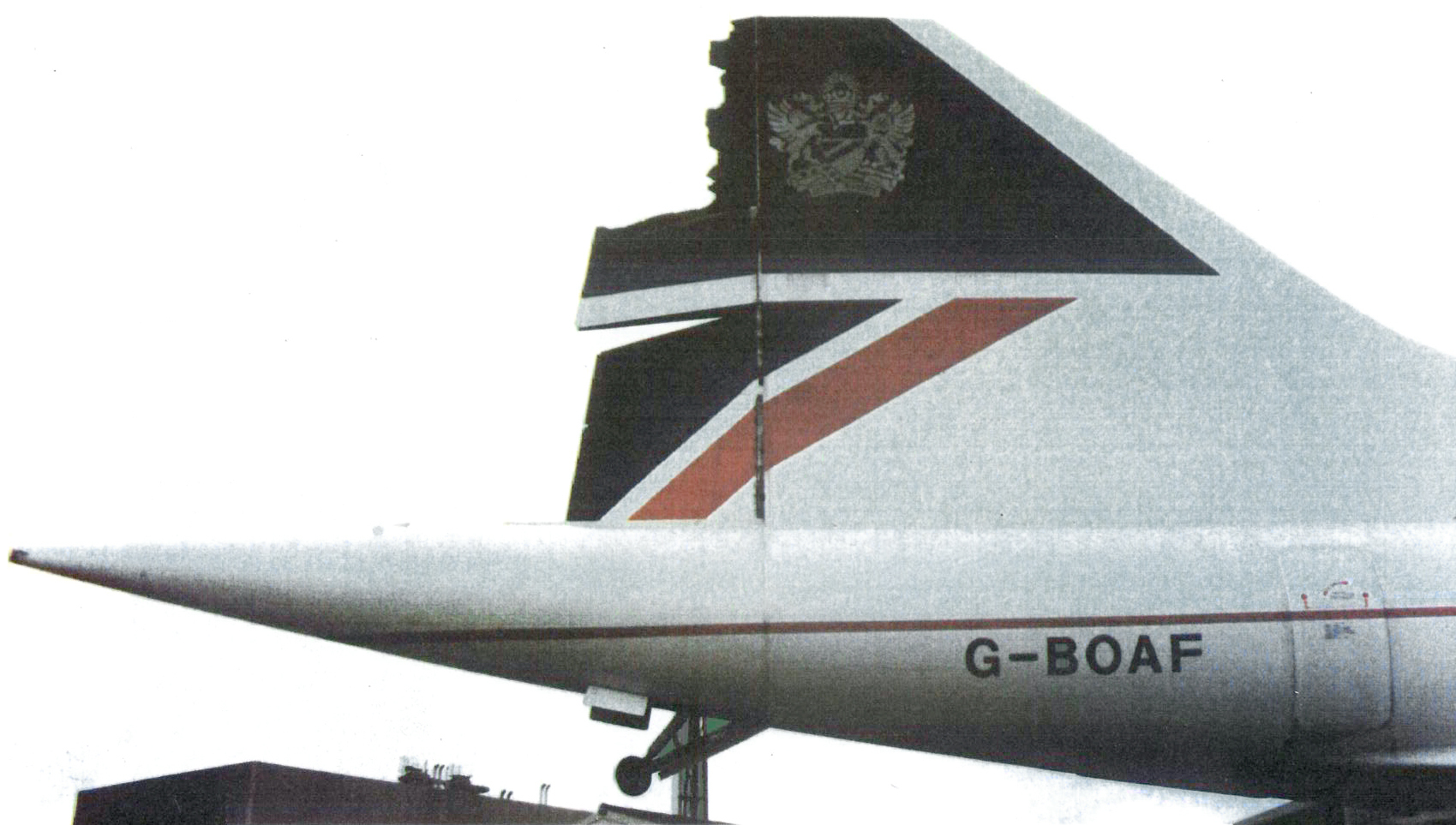
Damage to Concorde rudder after an accident in 1989

==== Accidents ====
Official investigating authorities have classified occurrences prior to Air France Flight 4590 as accidents, though no persons were injured and no aircraft were lost. These involved occurrences in which parts of the rudder had become separated inflight.

On 12 April 1989, Concorde G-BOAF, on a chartered flight from Christchurch, New Zealand, to Sydney, Australia, suffered a structural failure at supersonic speed. As the aircraft was climbing and accelerating through Mach 1.7, a "thud" was heard. The crew did not notice any handling problems, and they assumed the thud they heard was a minor engine surge. No further difficulty was encountered until descent through 40,000 feet (12,000 m) at Mach 1.3, when a vibration was felt throughout the aircraft, lasting two to three minutes. Most of the upper rudder had separated from the aircraft at this point. Aircraft handling was unaffected, and the aircraft made a safe landing at Sydney. The UK's Air Accidents Investigation Branch (AAIB) concluded that the skin of the rudder had been separating from the rudder structure over a period before the accident owing to moisture seepage past the rivets in the rudder. Production staff had not followed proper procedures during an earlier modification of the rudder; the procedures were difficult to adhere to. The aircraft was repaired and returned to service.

On 21 March 1992, G-BOAB while flying British Airways Flight 001 from London to New York, also suffered a structural failure at supersonic speed. While cruising at Mach 2, at approximately 53,000 feet (16,000 m), the crew heard a "thump". No difficulties in handling were noticed, and no instruments gave any irregular indications. This crew also suspected there had been a minor engine surge. One hour later, during descent and while decelerating below Mach 1.4, a sudden "severe" vibration began throughout the aircraft. The vibration worsened when power was added to the number 2 engine. The crew shut down the number 2 engine and made a successful landing in New York, noting that increased rudder control was needed to keep the aircraft on its intended approach course. Again, the skin had separated from the structure of the rudder, which led to most of the upper rudder detaching in flight. The AAIB concluded that repair materials had leaked into the structure of the rudder during a recent repair, weakening the bond between the skin and the structure of the rudder, leading to it breaking up in flight. The large size of the repair had made it difficult to keep repair materials out of the structure, and prior to this accident, the severity of the effect of these repair materials on the structure and skin of the rudder was not appreciated.

==== Incidents ====
Four incidents of partial rudder separation similar to the above accidents occurred in 1991, 1998, 2002, and 2003. Three incidents involving separation of part of an elevon (control surface on the trailing edge of Concorde's delta wing) have also occurred inflight. Although similar to the occurrences described above under Accidents, available official reports do not describe these as accidents. Degradation in aircraft performance or flight characteristics can be the basis for designation as an accident, and the pilots involved in these incidents did not report such degradations.

Tyre failures were an ongoing problem for Concorde. While investigating the crash of Flight 4590, the BEA established that from 1976 until the crash of Flight 4590 there had been 57 incidents of tyre failure involving Concordes. The most serious of these occurred on 14 June 1979, when Concorde F-BVFC lost two tyres during its takeoff roll at Washington Dulles Airport. Tyre #6 deflated and fragmented, and tyre #5 burst. Debris flying off at high speed from the tyres and damaged landing gear struck several locations under the wing, causing damage to electric and hydraulic lines and penetrating three fuel tanks. An opening of about 0.5 square metres was torn through the upper surface of the wing. One hydraulic system was lost completely and another was degraded. When the aircraft landed, it was leaking 4 kilograms (5 litres) of fuel per second. One month later, Concorde F-BFVD, a scheduled flight from Washington Dulles to Paris, suffered a tyre failure on takeoff from the same airport. Fragments from the tyre were ingested into the number two engine, causing its complete failure when the flight reached 29,000 feet in altitude. The flight diverted to JFK airport in New York.

== Aircraft on display ==
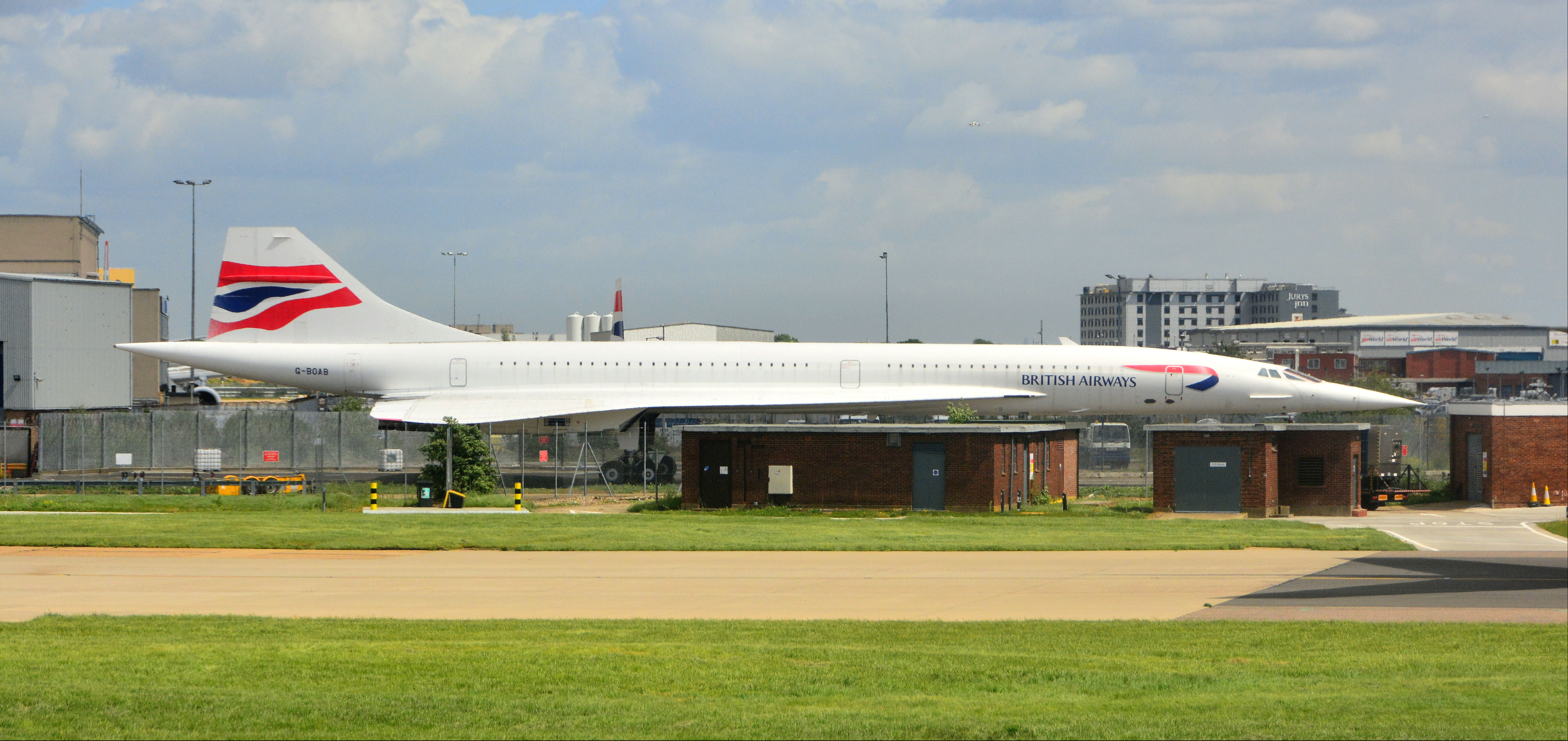
A former British Airways Concorde, pictured in 2014, on display at Heathrow Airport next to runway 27L

Twenty Concorde aircraft were built: two prototypes, two pre-production aircraft, two development aircraft and 14 production aircraft for commercial service. With the exception of two of the production aircraft, all are preserved, mostly in museums. One aircraft was scrapped in 1994, and another was destroyed in the Air France Flight 4590 crash in 2000. Air France Concorde F-BVFA is preserved at the Steven F. Udvar-Hazy Center in Virginia, and the Museum of Flight has British Airways Concorde G-BOAG on display in Seattle.

== Comparable aircraft ==
=== Tu-144 ===
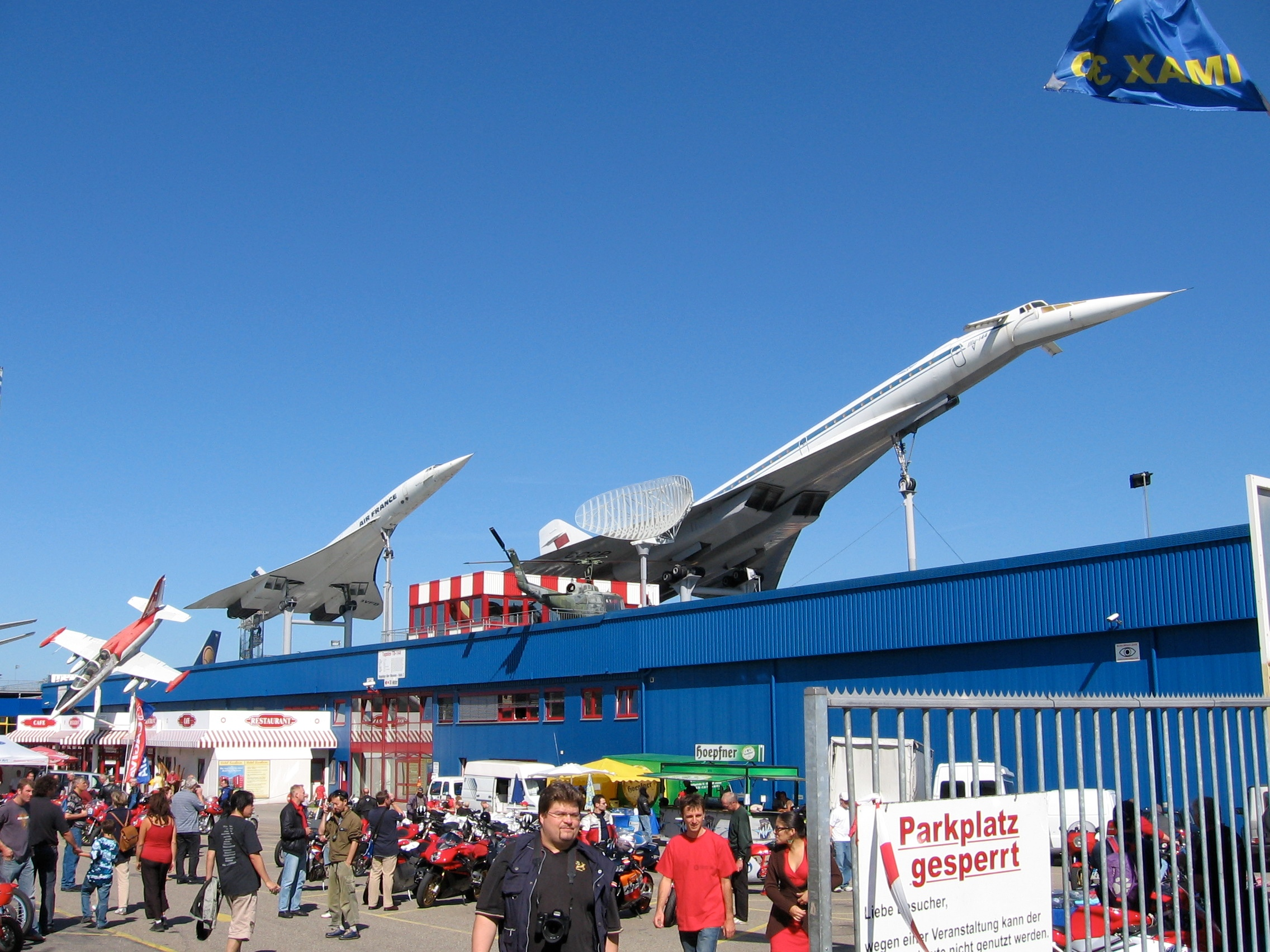
Concorde (left) and Tu-144 in Auto & Technik Museum Sinsheim

Boeing 2707 3-view diagram

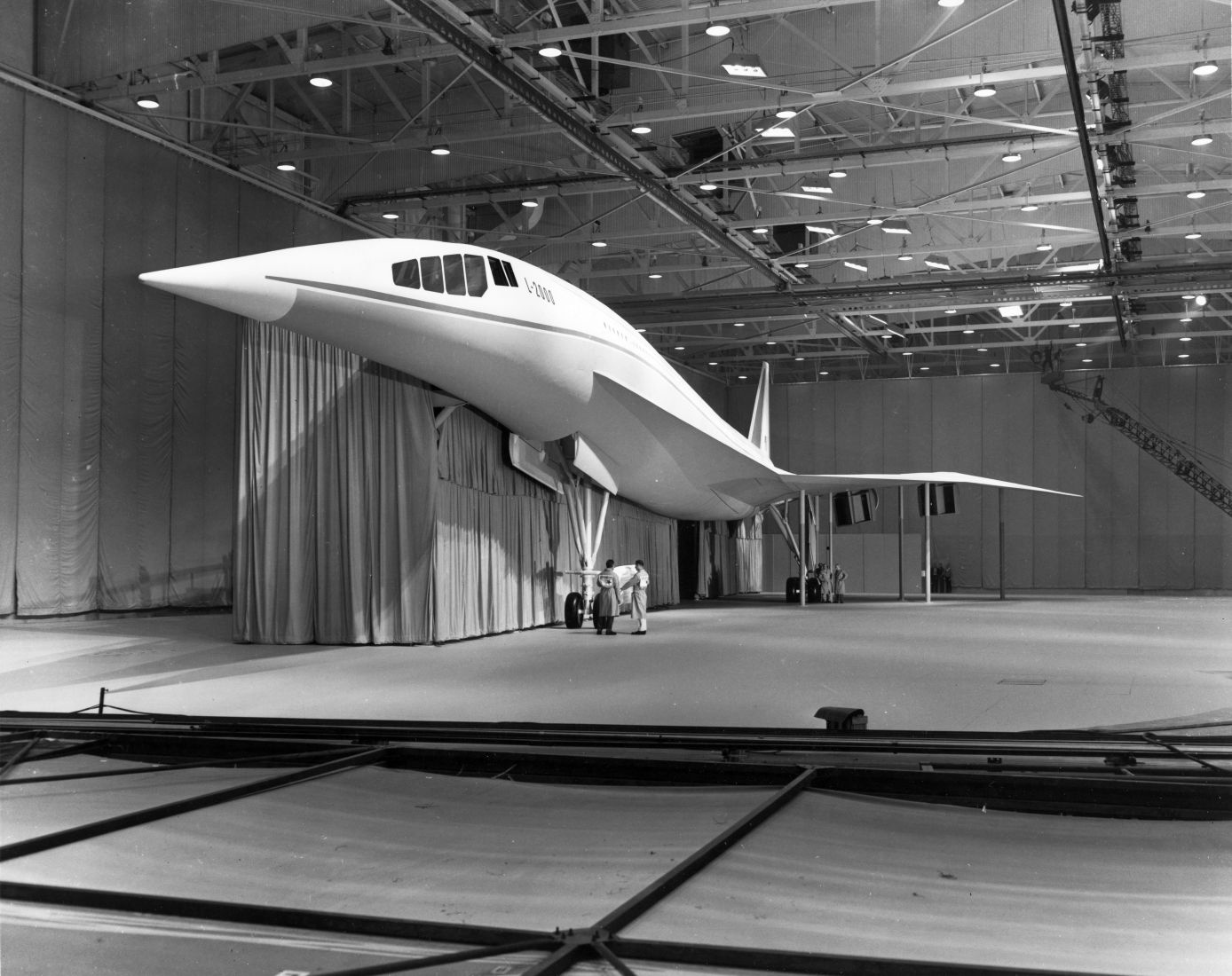
Lockheed L-2000 mockup

Concorde was one of only two supersonic jetliner models to operate commercially; the other was the Soviet-built Tupolev Tu-144, which operated in the late 1970s. The Tu-144 was nicknamed "Concordski" by Western European journalists for its outward similarity to Concorde. Soviet espionage efforts allegedly stole Concorde blueprints to assist in the design of the Tu-144. As a result of a rushed development programme, the first Tu-144 prototype was substantially different from the preproduction machines, but both were cruder than Concorde. The Tu-144S had a significantly shorter range than Concorde. Jean Rech, of Sud Aviation, attributed this to two things, a very heavy powerplant with an intake twice as long as that on Concorde, and low-bypass turbofan engines with too high a bypass ratio which needed afterburning for cruise. The aircraft had poor control at low speeds because of a simpler wing design. The Tu-144 required braking parachutes to land. The Tu-144 had two crashes, one at the 1973 Paris Air Show, and another during a pre-delivery test flight in May 1978.

Passenger service commenced in November 1977, but after the 1978 crash the aircraft was taken out of passenger service after only 55 flights, which carried an average of 58 passengers. The Tu-144 had an inherently unsafe structural design as a consequence of an automated production method chosen to simplify and speed up manufacturing. The Tu-144 programme was cancelled by the Soviet government on 1 July 1983.

=== SST and others ===
The main competing designs for the US government-funded supersonic transport (SST) were the swing-wing Boeing 2707 and the compound delta wing Lockheed L-2000. These were to have been larger, with seating for up to 300 people. The Boeing 2707 was selected for development. Concorde first flew in 1969, the year Boeing began building 2707 mockups after changing the design to a cropped delta wing; the cost of this and other changes helped to kill the project. The operation of US military aircraft such as the Mach 3+ North American XB-70 Valkyrie prototypes and Convair B-58 Hustler strategic nuclear bomber had shown that sonic booms were capable of reaching the ground, and the experience from the Oklahoma City sonic boom tests led to the same environmental concerns that hindered the commercial success of Concorde. The American government cancelled its SST project in 1971 having spent more than $1 billion without any aircraft being built.

== Impact ==
=== Environmental ===
Before Concorde's flight trials, developments in the civil aviation industry were largely accepted by governments and their respective electorates. Opposition to Concorde's noise, particularly on the east coast of the United States, forged a new political agenda on both sides of the Atlantic, with scientists and technology experts across a multitude of industries beginning to take the environmental and social impact more seriously. Although Concorde led directly to the introduction of a general noise abatement programme for aircraft flying out of John F. Kennedy Airport, many found that Concorde was quieter than expected, partly owing to the pilots temporarily throttling back their engines to reduce noise during overflight of residential areas. Even before commercial flights started, it had been claimed that Concorde was quieter than many other aircraft. In 1971, BAC's technical director stated, "It is certain on present evidence and calculations that in the airport context, production Concordes will be no worse than aircraft now in service and will in fact be better than many of them."

Concorde produced nitrogen oxides in its exhaust, which, despite complicated interactions with other ozone-depleting chemicals, are understood to result in degradation to the ozone layer at the stratospheric altitudes it cruised. It has been pointed out that other, lower-flying, airliners produce ozone during their flights in the troposphere, but vertical transit of gases between the layers is restricted. The small fleet meant overall ozone-layer degradation caused by Concorde was negligible. In 1995, David Fahey, of the National Oceanic and Atmospheric Administration in the United States, warned that a fleet of 500 supersonic aircraft with exhausts similar to Concorde might produce a 2 per cent drop in global ozone levels, much higher than previously thought. Each 1 per cent drop in ozone is estimated to increase the incidence of non-melanoma skin cancer worldwide by 2 per cent. Dr Fahey said if these particles are produced by highly oxidised sulphur in the fuel, as he believed, then removing sulphur in the fuel will reduce the ozone-destroying impact of supersonic transport.

Concorde's technical leap forward boosted the public's understanding of conflicts between technology and the environment as well as awareness of the complex decision analysis processes that surround such conflicts. In France, the use of acoustic fencing alongside TGV tracks might not have been achieved without the 1970s controversy over aircraft noise. In the UK, the CPRE has issued tranquillity maps since 1990.

=== Public perception ===
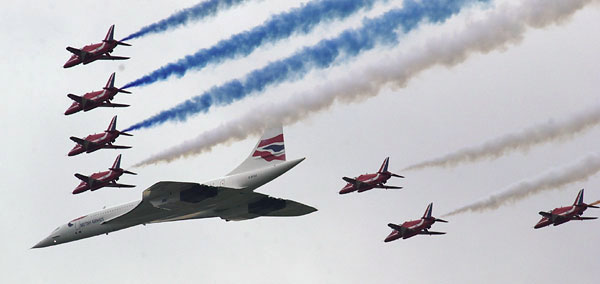
Parade flight with the Red Arrows at the Queen's Golden Jubilee, June 2002

Concorde was normally perceived as a privilege of the rich, but special circular or one-way (with return by other flight or ship) charter flights were arranged to bring a trip within the means of moderately well-off enthusiasts. As a symbol of national pride, an example from the BA fleet made occasional flypasts at selected Royal events, major air shows and other special occasions, sometimes in formation with the Red Arrows. On the final day of commercial service, public interest was so great that grandstands were erected at Heathrow Airport. Significant numbers of people attended the final landings; the event received widespread media coverage.

The aircraft was usually referred to by the British as simply "Concorde". In France, it was known as "le Concorde" owing to "le", the definite article, used in French grammar to introduce the name of a ship or aircraft, and the capital being used to distinguish a proper name from a common noun of the same spelling. In French, the common noun concorde means "agreement, harmony, or peace". (Note: concorde s.f. concord, unity, harmony, peace.) Concorde's pilots and British Airways in official publications often refer to Concorde both in the singular and plural as "she" or "her".

In 2006, 37 years after its first test flight, Concorde was announced the winner of the Great British Design Quest organised by the BBC (through The Culture Show) and the Design Museum. A total of 212,000 votes were cast with Concorde beating other British design icons such as the Mini, mini skirt, Jaguar E-Type car, the Tube map, the World Wide Web, the K2 red telephone box and the Supermarine Spitfire.

=== Special missions ===
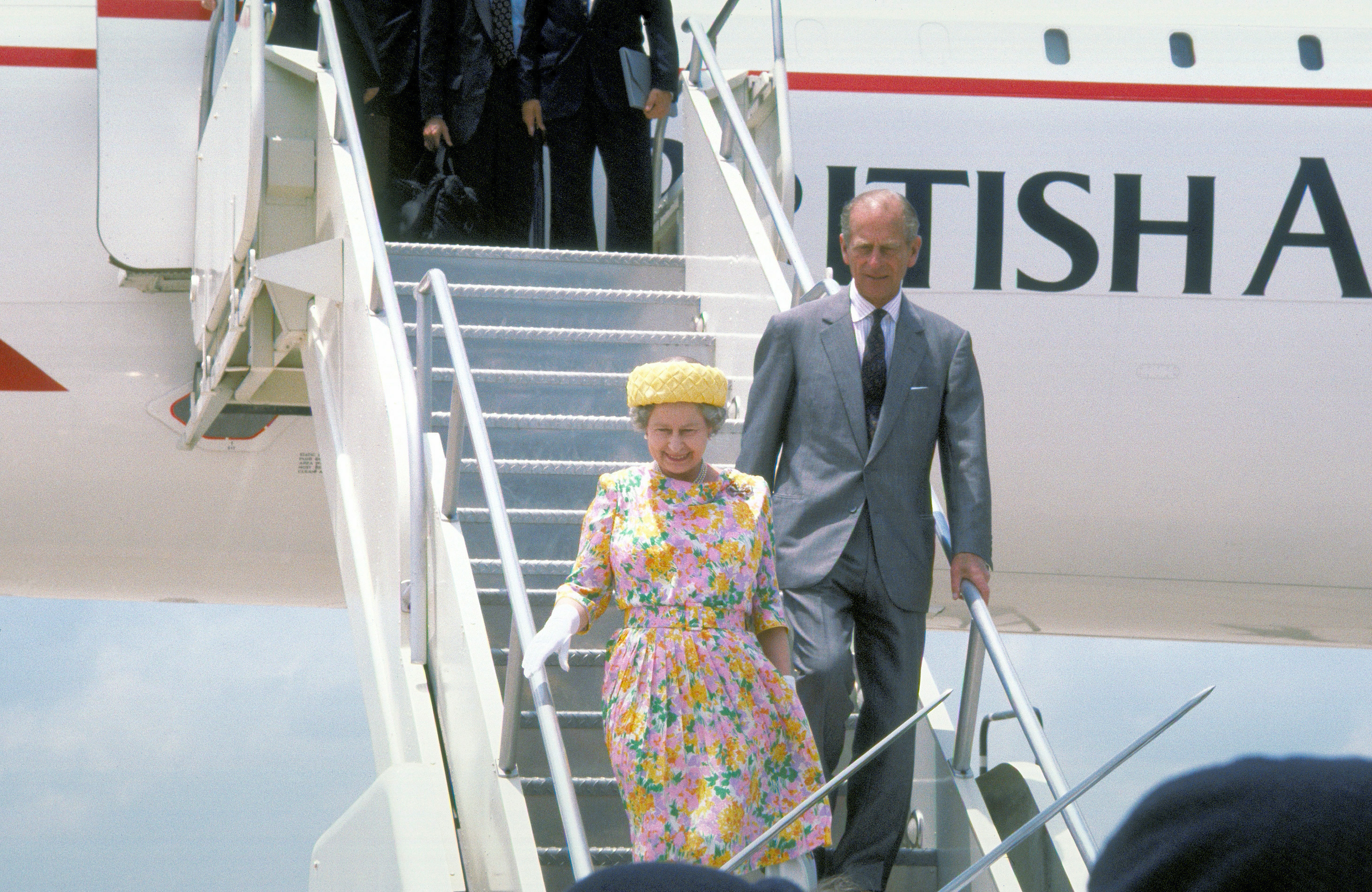
Elizabeth II and the Duke of Edinburgh disembark Concorde in 1991

The heads of France and the United Kingdom flew in Concorde many times. Presidents Georges Pompidou, Valéry Giscard d'Estaing and François Mitterrand regularly used Concorde as French flagship aircraft on foreign visits. Elizabeth II and Prime Ministers Edward Heath, Jim Callaghan, Margaret Thatcher, John Major and Tony Blair took Concorde in some charter flights such as the Queen's trips to Barbados on her Silver Jubilee in 1977, in 1987 and in 2003, to the Middle East in 1984 and to the US in 1991. Pope John Paul II flew on Concorde in May 1989.

Concorde sometimes made special flights for demonstrations, air shows (such as the Farnborough, Paris-Le Bourget, Oshkosh AirVenture and MAKS air shows) as well as parades and celebrations (for example, of Zurich Airport's anniversary in 1998). The aircraft were also used for private charters (including by the President of Zaire Mobutu Sese Seko on multiple occasions), for advertising companies (including for the firm OKI), for Olympic torch relays (1992 Winter Olympics in Albertville) and for observing solar eclipses, including the solar eclipse of 30 June 1973 and again for the total solar eclipse on 11 August 1999.

=== Records ===
The fastest transatlantic airliner flight was from New York JFK to London Heathrow on 7 February 1996, aided by a 175 mph (282 km/h) tailwind, by the British Airways G-BOAD, in 2 hours, 52 minutes, 59 seconds from take-off to touchdown. On 13 February 1985, a Concorde charter flight flew from London Heathrow to Sydney in a time of 17 hours, 3 minutes and 45 seconds, including refuelling stops.

Concorde set the FAI "Westbound Around the World" and "Eastbound Around the World" world air speed records. On 12–13 October 1992, in commemoration of the 500th anniversary of Columbus' first voyage to the New World, Concorde Spirit Tours (US) chartered Air France Concorde F-BTSD and circumnavigated the world in 32 hours 49 minutes and 3 seconds, from Lisbon, Portugal, including six refuelling stops at Santo Domingo, Acapulco, Honolulu, Guam, Bangkok, and Bahrain.

The eastbound record was set by the same Air France Concorde (F-BTSD) under charter to Concorde Spirit Tours in the US on 15–16 August 1995. This promotional flight circumnavigated the world from New York/JFK International Airport in 31 hours 27 minutes 49 seconds, including six refuelling stops at Toulouse, Dubai, Bangkok, Andersen AFB in Guam, Honolulu, and Acapulco.

On its way to the Museum of Flight in November 2003, G-BOAG set a New York City-to-Seattle speed record of 3 hours, 55 minutes, and 12 seconds. Owing to the restrictions on supersonic overflights within the US the flight was granted permission by the Canadian authorities for the majority of the journey to be flown supersonically over sparsely populated Canadian territory.

== Specifications ==
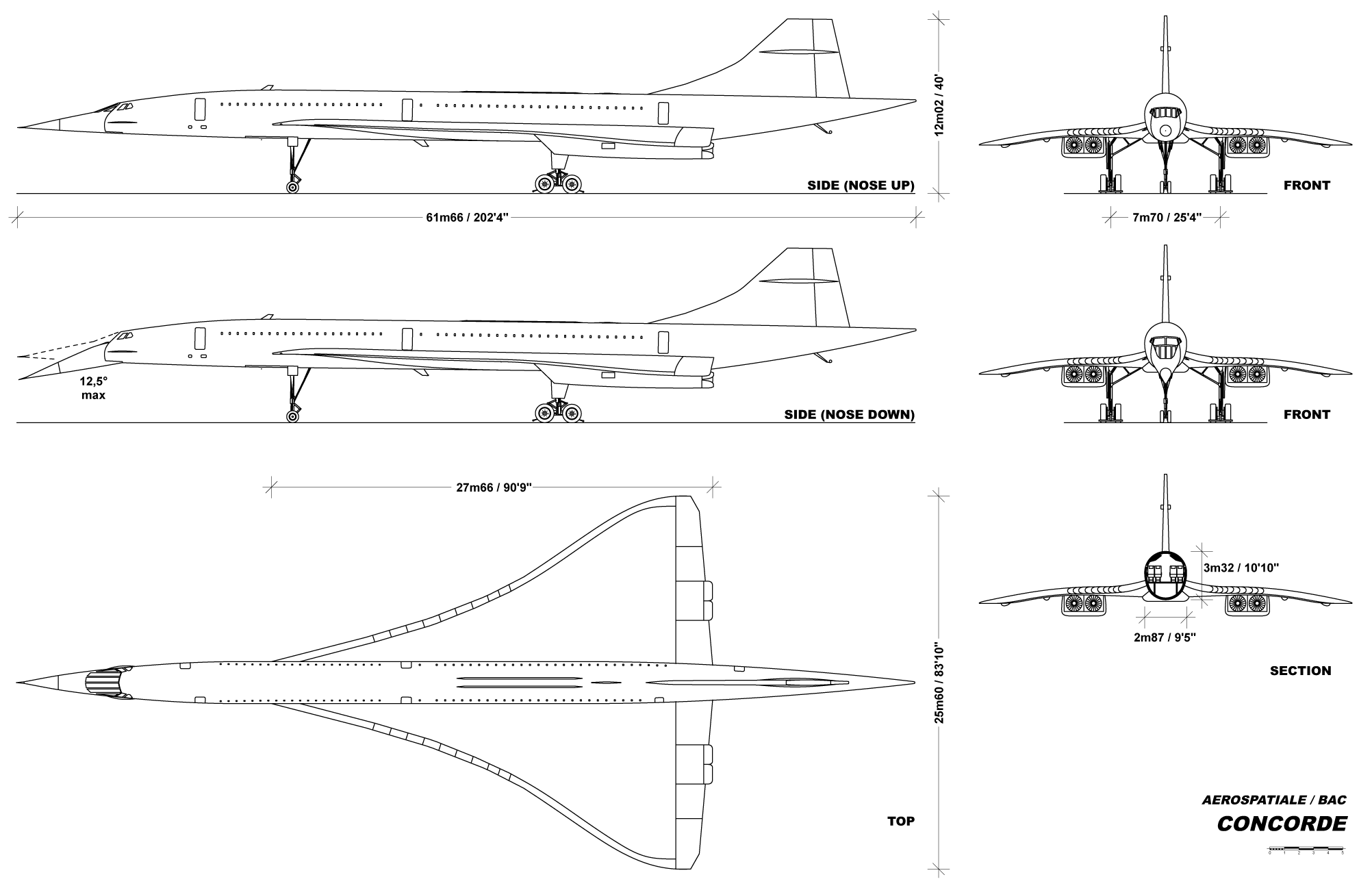
Other line drawings of Concorde

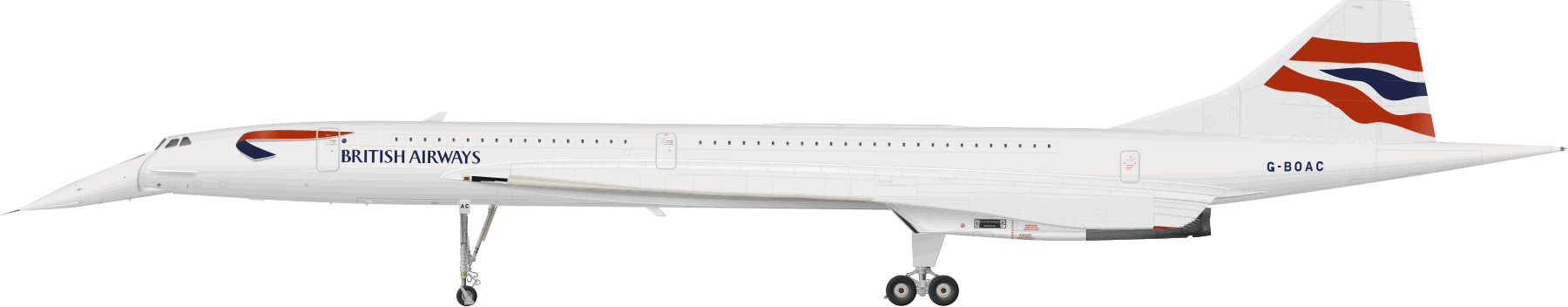
Concorde G-BOAC

Data from The Wall Street Journal, The Concorde Story, The International Directory of Civil Aircraft, Aérospatiale/BAC Concorde 1969 Onwards (All Models)

General characteristics

- Crew: 3 (2 pilots and 1 flight engineer)
- Capacity: 92–120 passengers
  (128 in high-density layout)
- Length: 202 ft 4 in (61.66 m)
- Wingspan: 84 ft 0 in (25.6 m)
- Height: 40 ft 0 in (12.2 m)
- Wing area: 3,856.2 sq ft (358.25 m^{2})
- Empty weight: 173,504 lb (78,700 kg)
- Gross weight: 245,000 lb (111,130 kg)
- Max takeoff weight: 408,010 lb (185,070 kg)
- Fuel capacity: 210,940 lb (95,680 kg); 119,600 L (26,300 imp gal; 31,600 US gal)
- Fuselage internal length: 129 ft 0 in (39.32 m)
- Fuselage width: maximum of 9 ft 5 in (2.87 m) external, 8 ft 7 in (2.62 m) internal
- Fuselage height: maximum of 10 ft 10 in (3.30 m) external, 6 ft 5 in (1.96 m) internal
- Maximum taxiing weight: 412,000 lb (187,000 kg)
- Powerplant: 4 × Rolls-Royce/Snecma Olympus 593 Mk 610 turbojets with reheat, 31,000 lbf (140 kN) thrust each dry, 38,050 lbf (169.3 kN) with afterburner

Performance

- Maximum speed: 1,177 kn (1,354 mph, 2,179 km/h)
- Maximum speed: Mach 2.04 (temperature limited)
- Cruise speed: 1,165 kn (1,341 mph, 2,158 km/h)
- Minimum control speed: 132 kn (152 mph, 244 km/h) 214 km/h, 116 kts (Note: slowest speed to maintain directional control on the ground with an engine failure.)
- Range: 3,900.0 nmi (4,488.0 mi, 7,222.8 km)
- Service ceiling: 60,000 ft (18,300 m)
- Rate of climb: 5,000 ft/min (25.4 m/s) at sea level
- Lift-to-drag: Low speed: 3.94; Approach: 4.35; 250 kn, 10,000 ft: 9.27; Mach 0.94: 11.47, Mach 2.04: 7.14
- Fuel consumption: 47 lb/mi (13.2 kg/km)
- Thrust/weight: 0.373
- Maximum nose tip temperature: 127 °C (260 °F; 400 K)
- Runway requirement (with maximum load): 3,600 m (11,800 ft)

Avionics

- Digital Air Intake Control Units
- Fly by wire flight controls
- Analogue electronic engine controls
- Triple inertial navigation units, one per flight crew
- Dual VHF omnidirectional range instruments
- Dual automatic direction finder instruments
- Dual distance measuring equipment instruments
- Triple Delco Carousel Inertial Navigation Units
- Dual instrument landing systems
- Automatic flight control system with dual autopilots, autothrottles, and flight directors: full autoland capability with visibility limits 250 m (820 ft) horizontally, 15 ft (4.6 m) decision height
- Ekco E390/564 weather radar
- Radio altimeters

== See also ==
- Barbara Harmer, the first qualified female Concorde pilot
- Museo del Concorde, a former museum in Mexico dedicated to the airliner

== Sources ==
- Conway, Eric (2005). High-Speed Dreams: NASA and the Technopolitics of Supersonic Transportation, 1945–1999. JHU Press. ISBN 978-0-8018-8067-4.
- Endres, Günter (2001). Concorde. St Paul, Minnesota: MBI Publishing Company. ISBN 978-0-7603-1195-0.
- Ferrar, Henry, ed. (1980). The Concise Oxford French-English Dictionary. New York: Oxford University Press. ISBN 978-0-19-864157-5.
- Frawley, Gerald (2003). The International Directory of Civil Aircraft, 2003/2004. Aerospace Publications. ISBN 978-1-875671-58-8.
- Gordon, Yefim; Rigmant, Vladimir (2005). Tupolev Tu-144. Hinckley, Leicestershire, UK: Midland. ISBN 978-1-85780-216-0..
- Gunn, John (2010). Crowded Skies. Turnkey Productions. ISBN 978-0-646-54973-6.
- Kelly, Neil (2005). The Concorde Story: 34 Years of Supersonic Air Travel. Surrey, UK: Merchant Book Company Ltd. ISBN 978-1-904779-05-6.
- McIntyre, Ian (1992). Dogfight: The Transatlantic Battle over Airbus. Westport, Connecticut: Praeger Publishers. ISBN 978-0-275-94278-6.
- Nunn, John Francis (1993). Nunn's Applied Respiratory Physiology. Burlington, Maryland: Butterworth-Heineman. ISBN 978-0-7506-1336-1.
- Olivier, Jean-Marc (2018). 1969 First Flight of the Concorde. Editions midi-pyrénéennes. ISBN 979-1-09-349833-1. OCLC 1066694697.
- Owen, Kenneth (2001). Concorde: Story of a Supersonic Pioneer. London: Science Museum. ISBN 978-1-900747-42-4.
- Orlebar, Christopher (2004). The Concorde Story. Oxford, UK: Osprey Publishing. ISBN 978-1-85532-667-5.
- Ross, Douglas (March 1978). "The Concorde Compromise: the politics of decision-making". Bulletin of the Atomic Scientists. 34 (3): 46–53. Bibcode:1978BuAtS..34c..46R. doi:10.1080/00963402.1978.11458481.
- Schrader, Richard K (1989). Concorde: The Full Story of the Anglo-French SST. Kent, UK: Pictorial Histories Pub. Co. ISBN 978-0-929521-16-9.
- Taylor, John W. R. (1965). Jane's All the World's Aircraft 1965–66. Marston.
- Talbot, Ted (2013), Concorde: A Designer's Life: The Journey to Mach 2, The History Press, ISBN 978-0-7524-8928-5
- Towey, Barrie, ed. (2007). Jet Airliners of the World 1949–2007. Tunbridge Wells, Kent, UK: Air-Britain (Historians) Ltd. ISBN 978-0-85130-348-2.
- Winchester, Jim (2005a). The World's Worst Aircraft: From Pioneering Failures to Multimillion Dollar Disasters. London: Amber Books Ltd. ISBN 978-1-904687-34-4.
- Winchester, Jim (2005b). X-Planes and Prototypes: From Nazi Secret Weapons to the Warplanes of the Future. Amber Books Ltd. ISBN 978-1-84013-815-3.
