= John Bedford =

English iron worker and industrialist

John Bedford (c. 1720–1791) was an English iron worker and industrialist.

== Life ==
He was born in Birmingham to John and Sarah Bedford, and followed his father into the iron trade to become a japanner in 1748.

Bedford was perhaps best known for his work in the Mid Glamorgan area of South Wales, but he did not move there directly from his native Birmingham. His career progressed and by 1765 he had moved from Birmingham to Trostrey, in Monmouthshire, and was the manager of a forge. His property and business interests in Birmingham were now managed by his father and it was the sale of one of his properties that financed the purchase of a forge at Rogerstone, South Wales.

He remained there until 1770 when he bought an 80-acre (320,000 m^{2}) estate in Cefn Cribwr, near Bridgend, where he planned to establish not only an iron works, complete with blast furnace and forge, but also the collieries, brickworks, mines and stone quarries to support it. Bedford, it seems, brought a sum of £36,000 to fund this venture and was possibly attracted to the area by the availability of local raw materials and its proximity to the sea via the harbor town of Porthcawl.

The venture failed to reach its full potential due to a number of factors, which included John Bedford's own eccentricity, the geographic position of the iron works, his reliance on borrowing and his lack of business acumen. His correspondence indicates that he was more interested in experimentation and development of the iron making techniques than running a viable business. Also apparent through his manuscripts of 1786 was his romantic thoughts about architecture, where he believed aesthetic beauty as important as functionality.

Although not renowned for his success on business side of iron making he was recognised for his contributions to the iron industry through the vast amount of correspondence he left, now held at the National Library of Wales, Aberystwyth.

John Bedford died on 30 September 1791, at Digbeth, Birmingham, and was buried at Marston Chapel, Hall Green, Birmingham.

His estate was divided between his wife and children and an area of his Cefn Cribwr estate was named Bedford Park, as a dedication to him. After his death the iron works and mine were sold off but the iron working continued until 1836. The brick making and coal mining, however, continued.

His great-grandson was famed aeronautics engineer, Sir Morien Morgan.
