= Quiet Spike =

2000s aerospace program

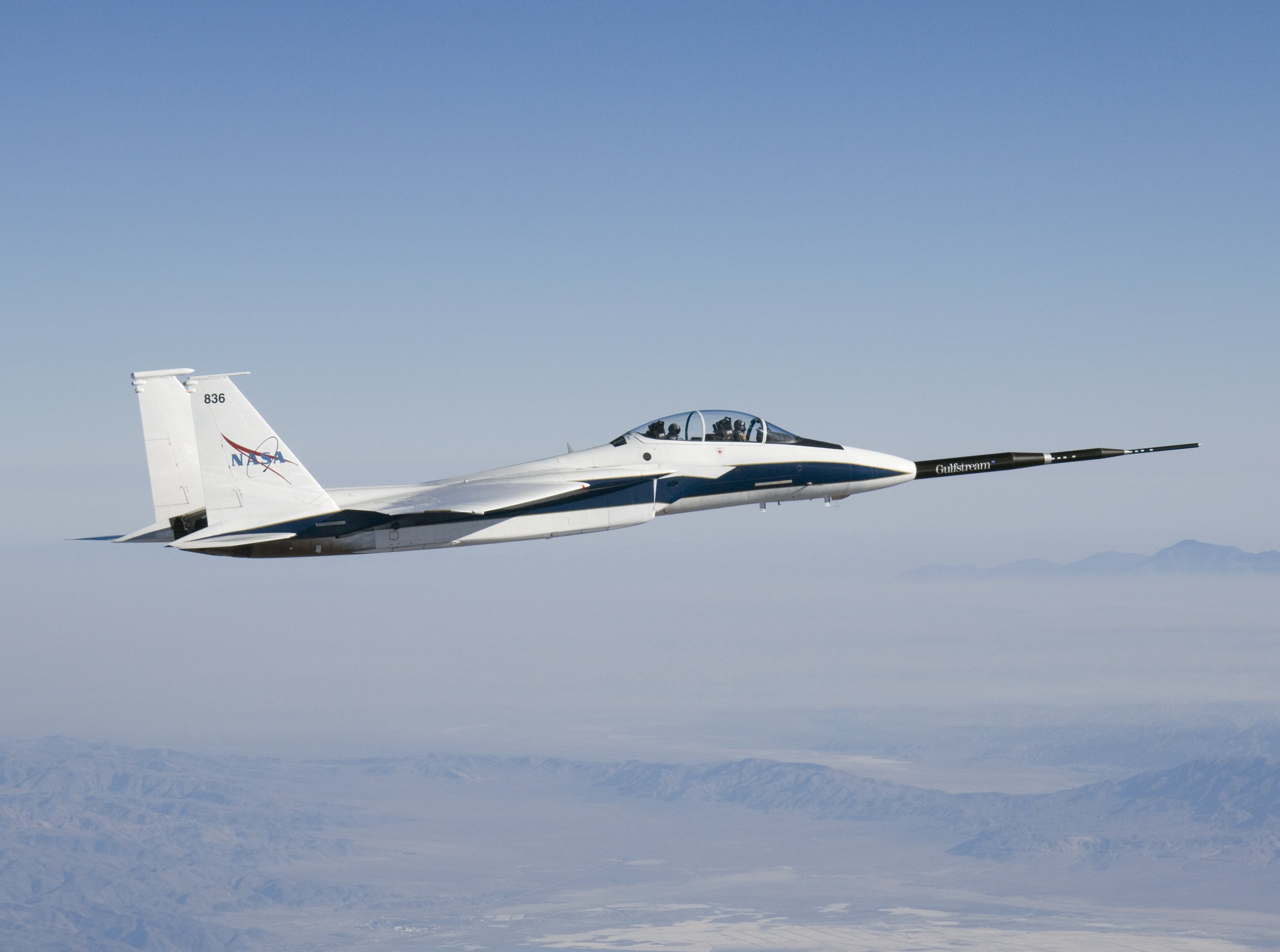
NASA's F-15B Research Testbed, aircraft No. 836 (74-0141), with the Quiet Spike attachment

Quiet Spike was a collaborative program between Gulfstream Aerospace and NASA's Dryden Flight Research Center to investigate the suppression of sonic booms. The patent was published with the United States Patent and Trademark Office in 2004 and is owned by Gulfstream Aerospace.

== History ==
The program was intended to develop technology that may allow next generation supersonic transports to overfly populated areas at above Mach 1 (the speed of sound) without the high intensity of sonic boom that proved problematic for first generation supersonic transports such as Concorde (cf. Operation Bongo).

The boom caused by Concorde generated substantial public opposition in the United States and eventually in other countries around the world, leading to the restriction of Concorde's commercial operations solely to routes that fly over oceans. The sonic boom issue was also a significant factor in the eventual cancellation of the Boeing 2707.

Shock waves develop around aircraft as they near Mach 1 (1225.0 km/h). At ground level, these are perceived as a loud double boom or bang. Their intensity varies due to factors such as weather, refraction from different layers of atmospheric density, and size of the aircraft, but in general, from a supersonic aircraft of the size of a civilian airliner, the overpressure created at ground level is enough to rattle windows.

For example, the overpressure of the sonic boom from Concorde was about 2.2 pounds per square foot (0.11 kPa).

Because of sonic boom intensity, many countries now prohibit supersonic overflight over land or population centres. The FAA prohibits supersonic flight over land, except in special military flight corridors. The Quiet Spike is able to suppress sonic booms somewhat, but a Quiet Spike alone is not effective enough to circumvent the current ban on supersonic overflight.

Various structural approaches have been proposed to mitigate sonic booms, mainly focusing around changes to aircraft noses, the use of chines, changes in aircraft planform and even creating pathways through the aircraft structure to mitigate parasitic drag that leads to shock waves.

As part of the Quiet Spike project, a retractable, 7.3 m (24 ft) long lance-like spike was mounted on the nose of NASA Dryden's F-15B research testbed aircraft. When in the 'fully retracted' position for take-offs and landings, the spike was 14.15 feet (4.31 m) long. When fully extended, the boom added two stages or states, to reach a total length of 24.31 feet (7.41 m). The Forward boom state was 5.9 feet (1.8 m) long and had the smallest diameter of the three, while the Mid-Boom State was 4.3 feet (1.3 m) long and the second largest in diameter. The spike, made of composite materials, creates three small shock waves that travel parallel to each other all the way to the ground, producing less noise than typical shock waves that build up at the front of supersonic jets.

After the project's first flight on 10 August 2006, several more flights put the system's structural integrity to the test before moving on to sonic boom suppression measurements.

The program concluded in February 2007, having completed over 50 flights, more than double those completed on the SSBD project two years earlier.

Project milestones

- First flight – 10 August 2006
- First in-flight extension of the Quiet Spike – 25 September 2006
- First supersonic test point – 20 October 2006
- Near field probing by 2nd F-15 – 13 December 2006
- Mach 1.8 test point – 19 January 2007
- Landing with Quiet Spike extended – 19 January 2007
- Return to Savannah, GA for demod – 14 February 2007

On March 4, 2008, the NASA-Gulfstream Quiet Spike team was awarded the Aviation Week Laureate Award in the Aeronautics/Propulsion category.

== See also ==
- Sukhoi-Gulfstream S-21
- Gulfstream X-54
- Quiet Supersonic Technology
- Shaped Sonic Boom Demonstration
