= Next Generation Supersonic Transport =

Supersonic transport development project

General information
- Type: Supersonic transport
- Designer: JAXA
- Status: Testing
- Number built: 0

History
- Manufactured: 0

The Next Generation Supersonic Transport is a supersonic transport (SST) technology development program run by the Japanese Space Agency JAXA. The original goal was to produce by 2015 a new aircraft designed to carry three times as many passengers as the Concorde, and fly at a similar Mach 2 speed of 2,449 kilometres per hour (1,522 mph), with twice the range. The goal is also to achieve a ticket price comparable to that of subsonic business class. An 11.5-meter prototype was tested in October 2005.

One of the most crucial factors in the commercial viability of a supersonic transport is the strength of the sonic boom it generates. The boom created by Concorde was powerful enough to prevent the aircraft from flying supersonically over land, which eliminated many possible passenger routes and contributed to the cancellation of Concorde's American rival, the Boeing 2707. In 2008, JAXA announced it would collaborate with NASA to conduct joint research on sonic boom modeling. In 2023, JAXA conducted tests on a scale model of NASA's Lockheed Martin X-59 experimental supersonic aircraft in their supersonic wind tunnel. The collaboration also started the "Re-BooT" (Robust en route sonic boom mitigation Technology demonstration) project in October 2024 to test a wing surface technology developed to reduce sonic boom on new aircraft designs.

JAXA is also researching hypersonic transport, at speeds exceeding Mach 5, or 6,125 kilometres per hour (3,806 mph), though the goal is not for its use in commercial aircraft to be cost competitive with current aircraft.
