= Gulfstream X-54 =

American supersonic research aircraft

X-54

General information
- Type: Experimental aircraft
- National origin: United States
- Manufacturer: Gulfstream Aerospace
- Status: In development
- Number built: 0

The Gulfstream X-54 is a proposed research and demonstration aircraft, under development in the United States by Gulfstream Aerospace for NASA, that is planned for use in sonic boom and supersonic transport research.

== Design ==
Initiated during 2008, the X-54 project is intended to produce an experimental aircraft capable of supersonic speeds with a formed sonic boom that is acoustically shaped to mitigate noise pollution. The X-54A is intended to demonstrate low-boom sonic effects in population impact studies in support of future supersonic transport design and regulation. Current regulations prohibit supersonic flight over land areas in the United States; the X-54 is part of NASA's efforts to have the regulations altered to allow for supersonic transports to be commercially viable.

NASA's X-54 project is intended to continue the research objectives of the DARPA Quiet Supersonic Aircraft, and is intended to demonstrate low-boom technologies and methods validated by projects such as the NASA Quietspike project, the Shaped Sonic Boom Demonstrator, FaINT Project, and WSPR Project. The X-54 will be designed from the ground up to incorporate all the technology and lessons learned from this combined NASA research spanning several decades into a viable aircraft capable of producing under 75 pdB on the ground while cruising over Mach 1.4 (1,500 km/h) above 15,000 m (50,000 ft). The X-54 aircraft will demonstrate low-noise supersonic flight for use in community base testing to provide research data to reform domestic and international regulations on supersonic over-land flight.

== Development ==
The X-54A was reported as being developed by Gulfstream Aerospace and is intended to be powered by two Rolls-Royce Tay turbofan engines. The X-54A may be connected to Gulfstream's "Sonic Whisper" program, trademarked in 2005 as an aircraft design to "reduce boom intensities during supersonic flight"; besides Gulfstream, Lockheed Martin and Boeing have also produced viable designs for commercial supersonic aircraft and all three companies are thought to be contenders in a competition for the X-54 demonstrator aircraft, however as of 2012 NASA lacked the funds to progress the project.

Although Gulfstream has made little comment about the X-54A project, at the 2008 National Business Aviation Association convention a Gulfstream executive stated that Gulfstream's work on advanced technologies for supersonic flight had been ongoing "for some time" and that a "complete airplane designed for low [sonic] boom" would possibly "have X-54 painted on the side of it". The designation "X-54A" was issued during 2008, but NASA stated it was considered a "placeholder" and was not actively cooperating with Gulfstream on the project.

As of late 2012 there were indications that Gulfstream was close to announcing the design of a quiet supersonic business jet. In November 2012, a patent showing a supersonic jet aircraft configuration was granted to Gulfstream.

As of late 2013, according to Gulfstream senior VP marketing and sales Scott Neal, “In order to make the market viable for supersonics you have to make it feasible to fly overland faster than sound – which is currently against the law. We don't think there is a viable market until you change that”.

== Specifications (X-54A) ==
Data from Jane's

- Powerplant: 2 × Rolls-Royce Tay 651 turbofan, 15,400 lbf (69 kN) thrust each

== See also ==
- Lockheed Martin X-59 QueSST
- Aerion AS2
- Quiet Spike
- Quiet Supersonic Technology
- Shaped Sonic Boom Demonstration

Aircraft of comparable role, configuration, and era

- Sukhoi-Gulfstream S-21

Related lists

- List of military aircraft of the United States
- List of X-planes
