= Cuba meteorite =

The Cuba meteorite exploded over Pinar del Río, Cuba, on February 1, 2019, between 1:16 – 1:17 p.m. EST, causing a sonic boom powerful enough to shatter windows. Several stony meteorites were found on the ground.

After grounding and fact checking the trajectory of the space rocks by the Institute of Physics of the University of Antioquia, it was found that the angle the space rocks took was pointing to just north of the Vinales, Cuba, from the south-southwest of Cuba, with few witnesses being able to see the initial streaks from parts of Florida
