= Supersonic transport =

Airliner faster than the speed of sound

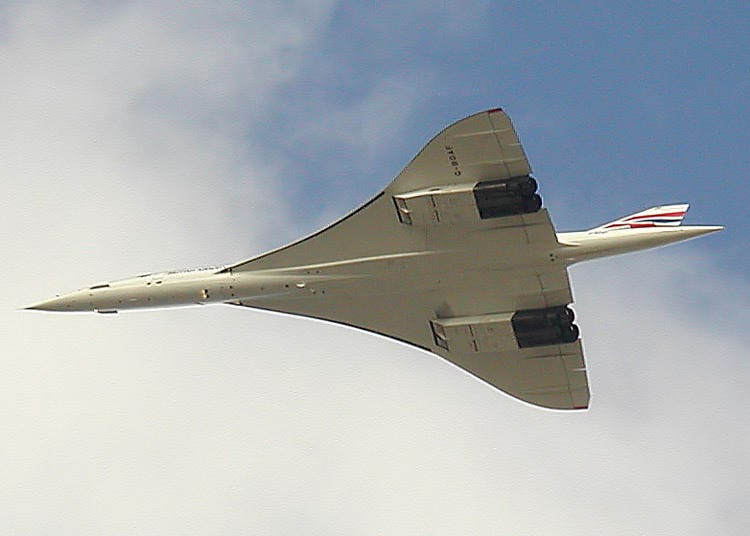
The Concorde supersonic transport had an ogival delta wing, a slender fuselage and four underslung Rolls-Royce/Snecma Olympus 593 engines.

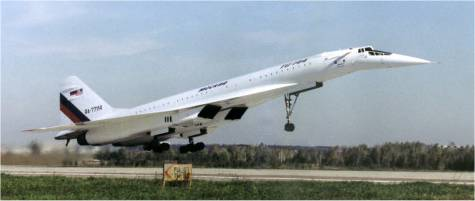
The Tupolev Tu-144 was the first SST to enter service and the first to leave it. Only 55 passenger flights were carried out before service ended due to safety concerns. A small number of cargo and test flights were also carried out after its retirement.

A supersonic transport (SST) or a supersonic airliner is a civilian supersonic aircraft designed to transport passengers at speeds greater than the speed of sound in terms of air speed. To date, the only SSTs to see regular service have been Concorde and the Tupolev Tu-144, although the Boom Technology Overture SST may succeed in starting service around 2029, which would make it the third operational SST. The last passenger flight of the Tu-144 was in June 1978 and it was last flown in 1999 by NASA. Concorde's last commercial flight was in October 2003, with a November 26, 2003, ferry flight being its last flight.

Following the termination of flying by Concorde, there have been no SSTs in commercial service. However, several companies have proposed supersonic business jet designs. Small SSTs have less environmental impact and design capability improves with continuing research which is aimed at producing an acceptable aircraft.

Supersonic airliners have been the objects of numerous ongoing design studies such as those of Boom Technology. Drawbacks and design challenges are excessive noise generation (at takeoff and due to sonic booms during flight), high development costs, expensive construction materials, high fuel consumption, extremely high emissions, and an increased cost per seat over subsonic airliners. However, despite these challenges, Concorde was claimed to have operated profitably.

== History ==
=== Planning ===
Throughout the 1950s an SST looked possible from a technical standpoint, but it was not clear if it could be made economically viable. Because of differences in lift generation, aircraft operating at supersonic speeds have approximately one-half the lift-to-drag ratio of subsonic aircraft. This implies that for any given required amount of lift, the aircraft will have to supply about twice the thrust, leading to considerably greater fuel use. This effect is pronounced at speeds close to the speed of sound, as the aircraft is using twice the thrust to travel at about the same speed. The relative effect is reduced as the aircraft accelerates to higher speeds. Offsetting this increase in fuel use was the potential to greatly increase sortie rates of the aircraft, at least on medium and long-range flights where the aircraft spends a considerable amount of time in cruise. SST designs flying at least three times as fast as existing subsonic transports were possible, and would thus be able to replace as many as three planes in service, and thereby lower costs in terms of manpower and maintenance.

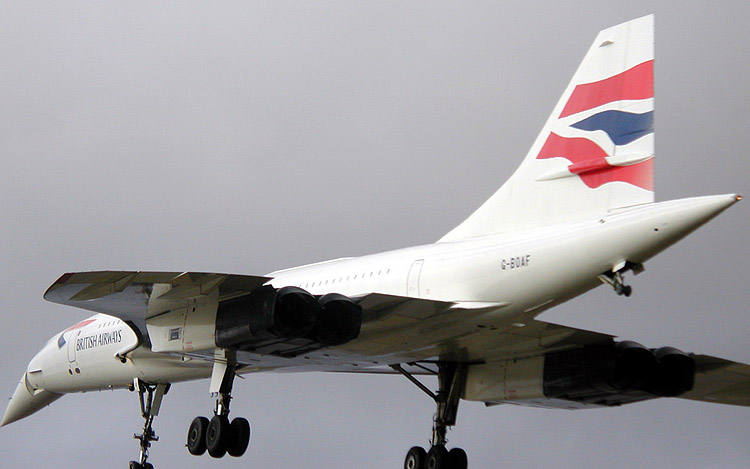
Concorde landing

Serious work on SST designs started in the mid-1950s, when the first generation of supersonic fighter aircraft were entering service. In Britain and France, government-subsidised SST programs quickly settled on the delta wing in most studies, including the Sud Aviation Super-Caravelle and Bristol Type 223, although Armstrong-Whitworth proposed a more radical design, the Mach 1.2 M-Wing. Avro Canada proposed several designs to TWA that included Mach 1.6 double-ogee wing and Mach 1.2 delta-wing with separate tail and four under-wing engine configurations. Avro's team moved to the UK where its design formed the basis of Hawker Siddeley's designs. By the early 1960s, the designs had progressed to the point where the go-ahead for production was given, but costs were so high that the Bristol Aeroplane Company and Sud Aviation eventually merged their efforts in 1962 to produce Concorde.

In the early 1960s, various executives of US aerospace companies were telling the US public and Congress that there were no technical reasons an SST could not be produced. In April 1960, Burt C Monesmith, a vice president with Lockheed, stated to various magazines that an SST constructed of steel weighing 250,000 pounds (110,000 kg) could be developed for $160 million and in production lots of 200 or more sold for around $9 million. But it was the Anglo-French development of the Concorde that set off panic in the US industry, where it was thought that Concorde would soon replace all other long range designs, especially after Pan Am took out purchase options on the Concorde. Congress was soon funding an SST design effort, selecting the existing Lockheed L-2000 and Boeing 2707 designs, to produce an even more advanced, larger, faster and longer ranged design. The Boeing 2707 design was eventually selected for continued work, with design goals of ferrying around 300 passengers and having a cruising speed near to Mach 3. The Soviet Union set out to produce its own design, the Tu-144, which the western press nicknamed the "Concordski".

=== Environmental concerns ===
The SST was seen as particularly offensive due to its sonic boom and the potential for its engine exhaust to damage the ozone layer. Both problems impacted the thinking of lawmakers, and eventually Congress dropped funding for the US SST program in March 1971, and all overland commercial supersonic flight was banned over the US. Presidential advisor Russell Train warned that a fleet of 500 SSTs flying at 65,000 ft (20 km) for a period of years could raise stratospheric water content by as much as 50% to 100%. According to Train, this could lead to greater ground-level heat and hamper the formation of ozone.

Later, an additional threat to the ozone was hypothesized as a result of the exhaust's nitrogen oxides, a threat that was, in 1974, seemingly validated by an MIT team commissioned by the United States Department of Transportation. However, while many purely theoretical models were indicating the potential for large ozone losses from SST nitrogen oxides (NOx), other scientists in the paper "Nitrogen Oxides, Nuclear Weapon Testing, Concorde and Stratospheric Ozone" turned to historical ozone monitoring and atmospheric nuclear testing to serve as a guide and means of comparison, observing that no detectable ozone loss was evident from approximately 213 megatons of explosive energy being released in 1962, so therefore the equivalent amount of NOx from "1047" Concordes flying "10 hours a day", would likewise, not be unprecedented. In 1981 models and observations were still irreconcilable. More recent computer models in 1995 by David W. Fahey, an atmospheric scientist at the National Oceanic and Atmospheric Administration, and others, suggest that the drop in ozone would be at most, "no more" than 1 to 2% if a fleet of 500 supersonic aircraft [were] operated. Fahey expressed that this would not be a fatal obstacle for an advanced SST development – while "a big caution flag...[it] should not be a showstopper for advanced SST development" because "removing the sulfur in the fuel of the [Concorde]" would essentially eliminate the hypothesized 1%–2% ozone-destruction-reaction-pathway.

=== Concorde ===
Despite the model-observation discrepancy surrounding the ozone concern, in the mid-1970s, six years after its first supersonic test flight, Concorde was now ready for service. The US political outcry was so high that the state of New York banned the plane. This threatened the aircraft's economic prospects — it had been built with the London–New York route in mind. The plane was allowed into Washington, D.C. (at Dulles in Virginia), and the service was so popular that New Yorkers were soon complaining because they did not have it. It was not long before Concorde was flying into JFK.

Along with shifting political considerations, the flying public continued to show interest in high-speed ocean crossings. This started additional design studies in the US, under the name "AST" (Advanced Supersonic Transport). Lockheed's SCV was a new design for this category, while Boeing continued studies with the 2707 as a baseline.

By this time, the economics of past SST concepts were no longer reasonable. When first designed, the SSTs were envisioned to compete with long-range aircraft seating 80 to 100 passengers such as the Boeing 707, but with newer aircraft such as the Boeing 747 carrying four times that, the speed and fuel advantages of the SST concept were taken away by sheer size.

Another problem was that the wide range of speeds over which an SST operates makes it difficult to improve engines. While subsonic engines had made great strides in increased efficiency through the 1960s with the introduction of the turbofan engine with ever-increasing bypass ratios, the fan concept is difficult to use at supersonic speeds where the "proper" bypass is about 0.45, as opposed to 2.0 or higher for subsonic designs. As a result of these reasons the SST designs were hindered and eventually extinct due to higher operational costs, and the AST programs vanished by the early 1980s.

=== Profitability ===
Concorde only sold to British Airways and Air France, with subsidized purchases that were to return 80% of the profits to the government. In practice for almost all of the length of the arrangement, there was no profit to be shared. After Concorde was privatized, cost reduction measures (notably the closing of the metallurgical wing testing site which had done enough temperature cycles to validate the aircraft through to 2010) and ticket price raises led to substantial profits.

Since Concorde stopped flying, it has been revealed that over the life of Concorde, the plane did prove profitable, at least to British Airways. Concorde operating costs over nearly 28 years of operation were approximately £1 billion, with revenues of £1.75 billion.

=== Final flights ===
On 25 July 2000, Air France Flight 4590 crashed shortly after take-off with all 109 occupants and four on ground killed; the only fatal incident involving Concorde. Commercial service was suspended until November 2001, and Concorde aircraft were retired in 2003 after 27 years of commercial operations.

The last regular passenger flights landed at London Heathrow on October 24, 2003, from New York, a second flight from Edinburgh, and a third which had taken off from Heathrow on a loop flight over the Bay of Biscay.

By the end of the 20th century, projects like the Tupolev Tu-244, Tupolev Tu-344, SAI Quiet Supersonic Transport, Sukhoi-Gulfstream S-21, High Speed Civil Transport, etc. had not been realized.

== Design ==
=== Aerodynamics ===
For all vehicles traveling through air, the force of drag is proportional to the coefficient of drag (C_{d}), to the square of the airspeed and to the air density. Since drag rises rapidly with speed, a key priority of supersonic aircraft design is to minimize this force by lowering the coefficient of drag. This gives rise to the highly streamlined shapes of SSTs. To some extent, supersonic aircraft also manage drag by flying at higher altitudes than subsonic aircraft, where the air density is lower.

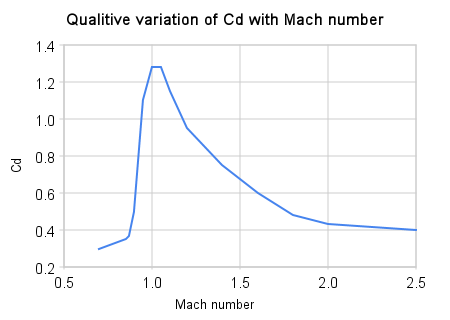
Qualitative variation in Cd factor with Mach number for aircraft

As speeds approach the speed of sound, the additional phenomenon of wave drag appears. This is a powerful form of drag that begins at transonic speeds (around Mach 0.88). Around Mach 1, the peak coefficient of drag is four times that of subsonic drag. Above the transonic range, the coefficient drops drastically again, although remains 20% higher by Mach 2.5 than at subsonic speeds. Supersonic aircraft must have considerably more power than subsonic aircraft require to overcome this wave drag, and although cruising performance above transonic speed is more efficient, it is still less efficient than flying subsonically.

Another issue in supersonic flight is the lift to drag ratio (L/D ratio) of the wings. At supersonic speeds, airfoils generate lift in an entirely different manner than at subsonic speeds, and are invariably less efficient. For this reason, considerable research has been put into designing wing planforms for sustained supersonic cruise. At about Mach 2, a typical wing design will cut its L/D ratio in half (e.g., Concorde managed a ratio of 7.14, whereas the subsonic Boeing 747 has an L/D ratio of 17). Because an aircraft's design must provide enough lift to overcome its own weight, a reduction of its L/D ratio at supersonic speeds requires additional thrust to maintain its airspeed and altitude.

=== Engines ===
Jet engine design shifts significantly between supersonic and subsonic aircraft. Jet engines, as a class, can supply increased fuel efficiency at supersonic speeds, even though their specific fuel consumption is greater at higher speeds. Because their speed over the ground is greater, this decrease in efficiency is less than proportional to speed until well above Mach 2, and the consumption per unit distance is lower.

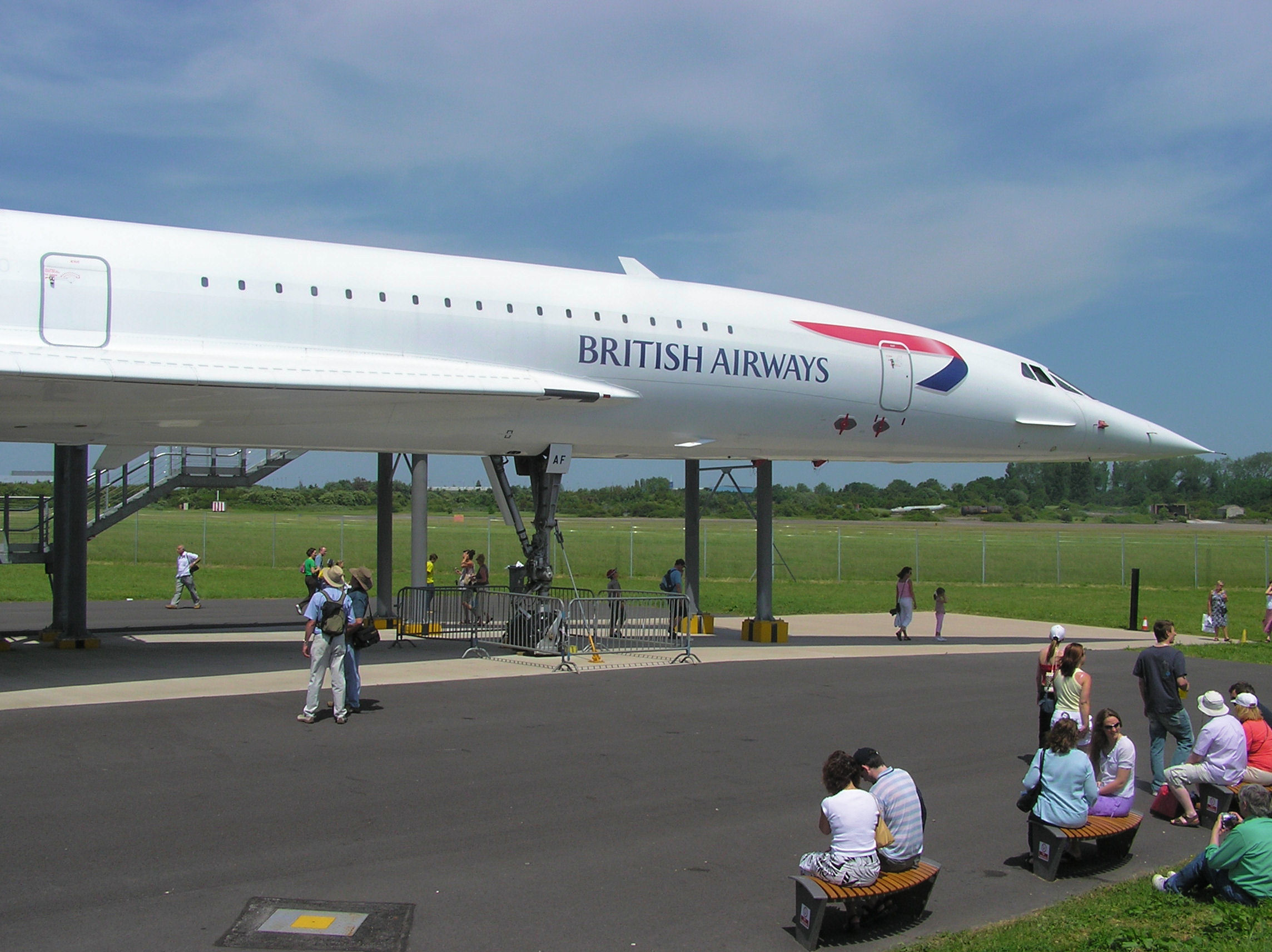
British Airways Concorde at Filton Aerodrome, Bristol, England shows the slender fuselage necessary for supersonic flight.

When Concorde was being designed by Aérospatiale–BAC, high bypass jet engines ("turbofan" engines) had not yet been deployed on subsonic aircraft. Had Concorde entered service against earlier designs like the Boeing 707 or de Havilland Comet, it would have been much more competitive, though the 707 and DC-8 still carried more passengers. When these high bypass jet engines reached commercial service in the 1960s, subsonic jet engines immediately became much more efficient, closer to the efficiency of turbojets at supersonic speeds. One major advantage of the SST disappeared.

Turbofan engines improve efficiency by increasing the amount of cold low-pressure air they accelerate, using some of the energy normally used to accelerate hot air in the classic non-bypass turbojet. The ultimate expression of this design is the turboprop, where almost all of the jet thrust is used to power a very large fan – the propeller. The efficiency curve of the fan design means that the amount of bypass that maximizes overall engine efficiency is a function of forward speed, which decreases from propellers, to fans, to no bypass at all as speed increases. Additionally, the large frontal area taken up by the low-pressure fan at the front of the engine increases drag, especially at supersonic speeds, and means the bypass ratios are much more limited than on subsonic aircraft.

For example, the early Tu-144S was fitted with a low bypass turbofan engine which was much less efficient than Concorde's turbojets in supersonic flight. The later TU-144D featured turbojet engines with comparable efficiency. These limitations meant that SST designs were not able to take advantage of the dramatic improvements in fuel economy that high bypass engines brought to the subsonic market, but they were already more efficient than their subsonic turbofan counterparts.

=== Structure ===
Supersonic vehicle speeds demand narrower wing and fuselage designs, and are subject to greater stresses and temperatures. This leads to aeroelasticity problems, which require heavier structures to minimize unwanted flexing. SSTs also require a much stronger (and therefore heavier) structure because their fuselage must be pressurized to a greater differential than subsonic aircraft, which do not operate at the high altitudes necessary for supersonic flight. These factors together meant that the empty weight per seat of Concorde is more than three times that of a Boeing 747.

Concorde and the Tu-144 were both constructed of conventional aluminum: Concorde of Hiduminium and Tu-144 of duralumin. Modern, advanced materials were not to come out of development for a few decades. These materials, such as carbon fibre and Kevlar are much stronger for their weight (important to deal with stresses) as well as being more rigid. As per-seat weight of the structure is much higher in an SST design, structural improvements would have led to a greater proportional improvement than the same changes in a subsonic aircraft.

=== Cost ===
Concorde fuel efficiency comparison
Aircraft	Concorde	Boeing 747-400
Passenger miles/imperial gallon	17	109
Passenger miles/US gallon	14	91
Litres/passenger 100 km	16.6	2.6

Higher fuel costs and lower passenger capacities due to the aerodynamic requirement for a narrow fuselage make SSTs an expensive form of commercial civil transportation compared with subsonic aircraft. For example, the Boeing 747 can carry more than three times as many passengers as Concorde while using approximately the same amount of fuel.

Nevertheless, fuel costs are not the bulk of the price for most subsonic aircraft passenger tickets. For the transatlantic business market that SST aircraft were utilized for, Concorde was actually very successful, and was able to sustain a higher ticket price. Now that commercial SST aircraft have stopped flying, it has become clearer that Concorde made substantial profit for British Airways.

=== Noise pollution ===
Extreme jet velocities used during take-off caused Concorde and Tu-144s to produce significant take-off noise. Communities near the airport were affected by high engine noise levels, which prompted some regulators to disfavor the practice. SST engines need a fairly high specific thrust (net thrust/airflow) during supersonic cruise, to minimize engine cross-sectional area and, thereby, nacelle drag. Unfortunately this implies a high jet velocity, which makes the engines noisy, particularly at low speeds/altitudes and at take-off.

Therefore, a future SST might well benefit from a variable cycle engine, where the specific thrust (and therefore jet velocity and noise) is low at take-off, but is forced high during supersonic cruise. Transition between the two modes would occur at some point during the climb and back again during the descent (to minimize jet noise upon approach). The difficulty is devising a variable cycle engine configuration that meets the requirement for a low cross-sectional area during supersonic cruise.

The sonic boom was not thought to be a serious issue due to the high altitudes at which the planes flew, but experiments in the mid-1960s such as the controversial Oklahoma City sonic boom tests and studies of the USAF's North American XB-70 Valkyrie proved otherwise (see Sonic boom § Abatement). By 1964, whether civilian supersonic aircraft would be licensed was unclear, because of the problem.

The annoyance of a sonic boom can be avoided by waiting until the aircraft is at high altitude over water before reaching supersonic speeds; this was the technique used by Concorde. However, it precludes supersonic flight over populated areas. Supersonic aircraft have poor lift/drag ratios at subsonic speeds as compared to subsonic aircraft (unless technologies such as variable-sweep wings are employed), and hence burn more fuel, which results in their use being economically disadvantageous on such flight paths.

Concorde had an overpressure of 1.94 lb/ft^{2} (93 Pa) (133 dBA SPL). Overpressures over 1.5 lb/ft^{2} (72 Pa) (131 dBA SPL) often cause complaints.

If the intensity of the boom can be reduced, then this may make even very large designs of supersonic aircraft acceptable for overland flight. Research suggests that changes to the nose cone and tail can reduce the intensity of the sonic boom below that needed to cause complaints. During the original SST efforts in the 1960s, it was suggested that careful shaping of the fuselage of the aircraft could reduce the intensity of the sonic boom's shock waves that reach the ground. One design caused the shock waves to interfere with each other, greatly reducing the sonic boom. This was difficult to test at the time, but the increasing power of computer-aided design has since made this considerably easier. In 2003, a Shaped Sonic Boom Demonstration aircraft was flown which proved the soundness of the design and demonstrated the capability of reducing the boom by about half. Even lengthening the vehicle (without significantly increasing the weight) would seem to reduce the boom intensity (see Sonic boom § Abatement).

When it comes to public policy, for example, the FAA prohibits commercial airplanes from flying at supersonic speeds above sovereign land governed by the United States because of the negative impact the sonic boom brings to humans and animal populations below.

=== Large speed range ===
The aerodynamic design of a supersonic aircraft needs to change with its speed for optimal performance. Thus, an SST would ideally change shape during flight to maintain optimal performance at both subsonic and supersonic speeds. Such a design would introduce complexity which increases maintenance needs, operations costs, and safety concerns.

In practice all supersonic transports have used essentially the same shape for subsonic and supersonic flight, and a compromise in performance is chosen, often to the detriment of low speed flight. For example, Concorde had very high drag (a lift to drag ratio of about 4) at slow speed, but it travelled at high speed for most of the flight. Designers of Concorde spent 5000 hours optimizing the vehicle shape in wind tunnel tests to maximize the overall performance over the entire flightplan.

The Boeing 2707 featured swing wings to give higher efficiency at low speeds, but the increased space required for such a feature produced capacity problems that proved ultimately insurmountable.

North American Aviation had an unusual approach to this problem with the XB-70 Valkyrie. By lowering the outer panels of the wings at high Mach numbers, they were able to take advantage of compression lift on the underside of the aircraft. This improved the L/D ratio by about 30%.

=== Skin temperature ===
Both compression of and friction with the surrounding air heat supersonic aircraft, with temperature increasing with aircraft speed. Heat from the sun also raises the skin temperature. Heat transfers into the aircraft structure which also gets hotter. By the early 1960s many investigations in the United States, Britain and France had shown equilibrium skin temperatures varying from 130 °C at Mach 2.2 to 330 °C at Mach 3.

Subsonic aircraft are often made of aluminium alloys. However such alloys, while being light and strong, is not able to withstand temperatures much over 127 °C; above 127 °C the aluminium gradually loses its properties that were brought about by age hardening. For aircraft that have flown at Mach 3, materials such as stainless steel (XB-70 Valkyrie, MiG-25) or titanium (SR-71, Sukhoi T-4) have been used.

=== Range ===
The range of an aircraft depends on three efficiencies which appear in the Breguet range equation. They are the aerodynamic efficiency, which says how much wanted lift can be produced without too much unwanted drag, powerplant efficiency, which says how much fuel is converted into moving the aircraft against its drag resistance, and structural efficiency, which says how heavy the structure is compared to the fuel and passengers it can carry.

=== Commercial practicality ===
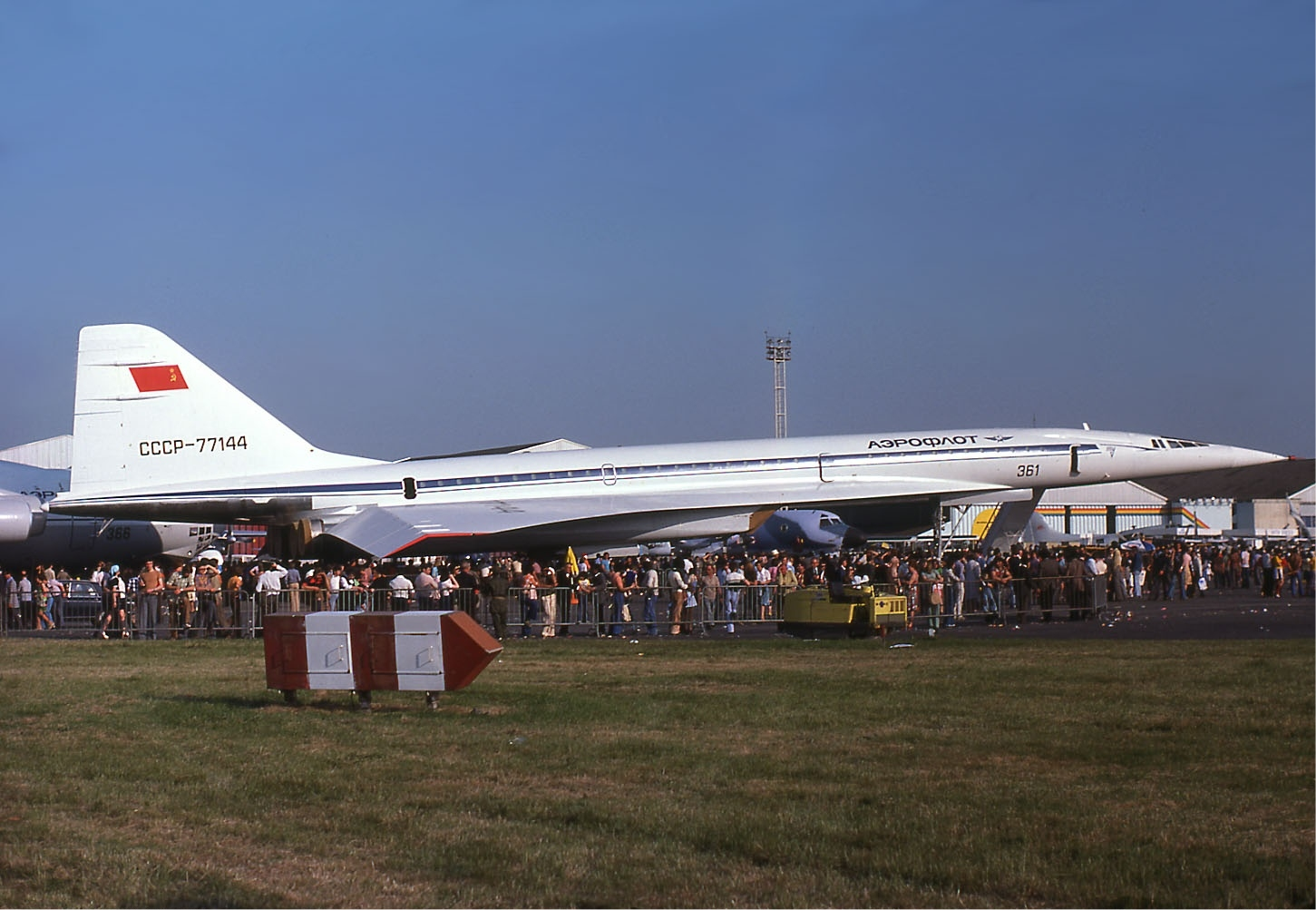
Aeroflot Tupolev Tu-144 at the Paris Air Show in 1975

Airlines potentially value very fast aircraft, because it enables the aircraft to make more flights per day, providing a higher return on investment. Also, passengers generally prefer faster trips, creating a competitive advantage and the ability to charge higher fares. However, Concorde's high noise levels around airports, time zone issues, and insufficient speed meant that only a single return trip could be made per day, so the extra speed was not an advantage to the airline other than as a selling feature to its customers. The proposed American SSTs were intended to fly at Mach 3, partly for this reason.

Since SSTs produce sonic booms at supersonic speeds, they are rarely permitted to fly supersonic over land. Since they are inefficient at subsonic speeds compared to subsonic aircraft, range is deteriorated and the number of routes that the aircraft can fly non-stop is reduced. This also reduces the desirability of such aircraft for most airlines.

Supersonic aircraft have higher per-passenger fuel consumption than subsonic aircraft. This makes the ticket price higher and more sensitive to the price of oil. It also makes supersonic flights more polluting.

Investing in research and development work to design a new SST can be considered as an effort to push the speed limit of air transport. Generally, other than an urge for new technological achievement, the major driving force for such an effort is competitive pressure from other modes of transport. Competition between different service providers within a mode of transport does not typically lead to such technological investments to increase the speed. Instead, the service providers prefer to compete in service quality and cost. An example of this phenomenon is high-speed rail. The speed limit of rail transport had been pushed so hard to enable it to effectively compete with road and air transport. But this achievement was not done for different rail operating companies to compete among themselves. This phenomenon also reduces the airline desirability of SSTs, because, for very long-distance transportation (a couple of thousand kilometers), competition between different modes of transport is rather like a single-horse race: air transport does not have a significant competitor. The only competition is between the airline companies, and they would rather pay moderately to reduce cost and increase service quality than pay much more for a speed increase. Also, for-profit companies generally prefer low risk business plans with high probabilities of appreciable profit, but an expensive leading-edge technological research and development program is a high-risk enterprise, as it is possible that the program will fail for unforeseeable technical reasons or will meet cost overruns so great as to force the company, due to financial resource limits, to abandon the effort before it yields any marketable SST technology, causing potentially all investment to be lost.

=== Environmental impact ===
The International Council on Clean Transportation (ICCT) estimates a SST would burn 5 to 7 times as much fuel per passenger. The ICCT shows that a New York to London supersonic flight would consume more than twice as much fuel per passenger than in subsonic business-class, six times as much as for economy class, and three times as much as subsonic business for Los Angeles to Sydney. Designers can either meet existing environmental standards with advanced technology or lobby policymakers to establish new standards for SSTs.

If there were 2,000 SSTs in 2035, there would be 5,000 flights per day at 160 airports and the SST fleet would emit ~96 million metric tons of CO_{2} per year (like American, Delta and Southwest combined in 2017), 1.6 to 2.4 gigatonnes of CO_{2} over their 25-year lifetime: one-fifth of the international aviation carbon budget if aviation maintains its emissions share to stay under a 1.5 °C climate trajectory. Noise exposed area around airports could double compared to existing subsonic aircraft of the same size, with more than 300 operations per day at Dubai and London Heathrow, and over 100 in Los Angeles, Singapore, San Francisco, New York-JFK, Frankfurt, and Bangkok. Frequent sonic booms would be heard in Canada, Germany, Iraq, Ireland, Israel, Romania, Turkey, and parts of the United States, up to 150–200 per day or one every five minutes.

== Completed projects ==
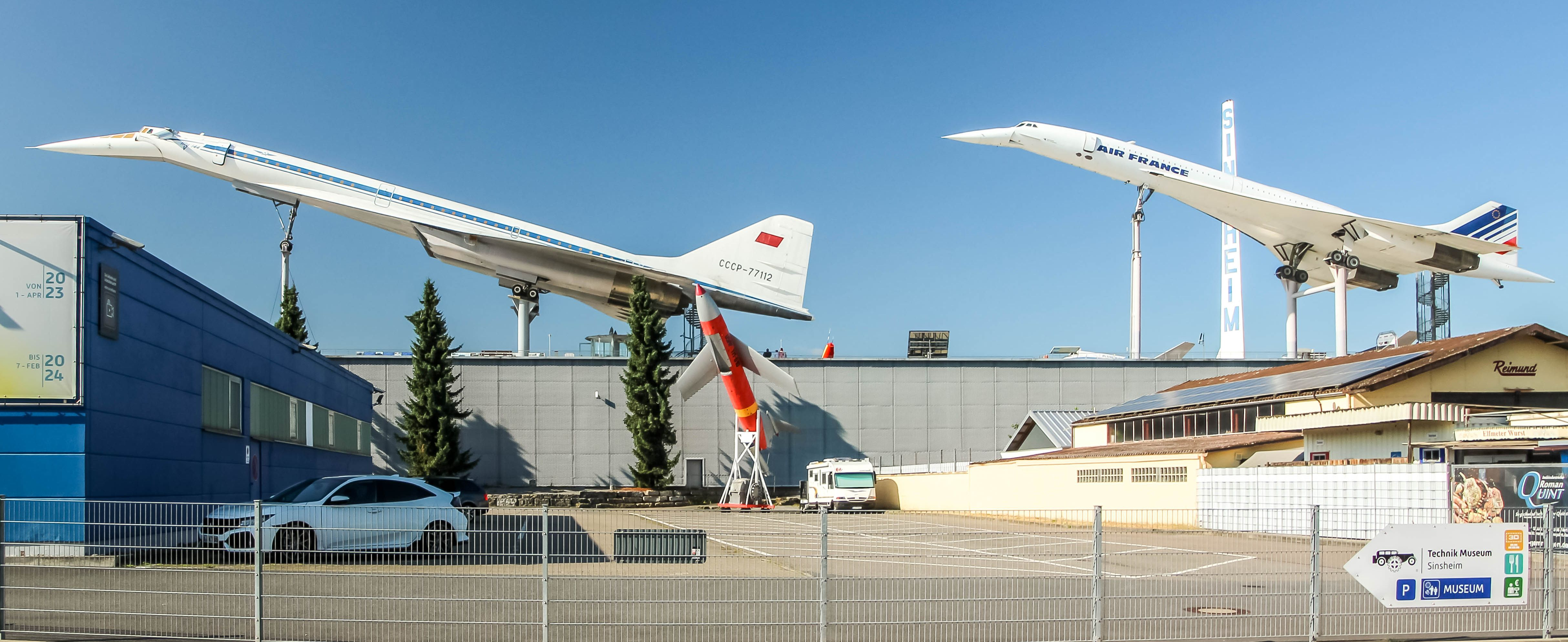
The Sinsheim Auto & Technik Museum in Germany is the only location where both Concorde and the Tu-144 are displayed together

On August 21, 1961, a Douglas DC-8-43 (registration N9604Z) exceeded Mach 1 in a controlled dive during a test flight at Edwards Air Force Base. The crew were William Magruder (pilot), Paul Patten (copilot), Joseph Tomich (flight engineer), and Richard H. Edwards (flight test engineer). This is the first supersonic flight by a civilian airliner.

In total, 20 Concordes were built: two prototypes, two development aircraft and 16 production aircraft. Of the sixteen production aircraft, two did not enter commercial service and eight remained in service as of April 2003. All but two of these aircraft are preserved; the two that are not are F-BVFD (cn 211), parked as a spare-parts source in 1982 and scrapped in 1994, and F-BTSC (cn 203), which crashed outside Paris on July 25, 2000, killing 100 passengers, 9 crew members, and 4 people on the ground.

A total of sixteen airworthy Tupolev Tu-144s were built; a seventeenth Tu-144 (reg. 77116) was never completed. There was also at least one ground test airframe for static testing in parallel with the prototype 68001 development.

== Future development ==
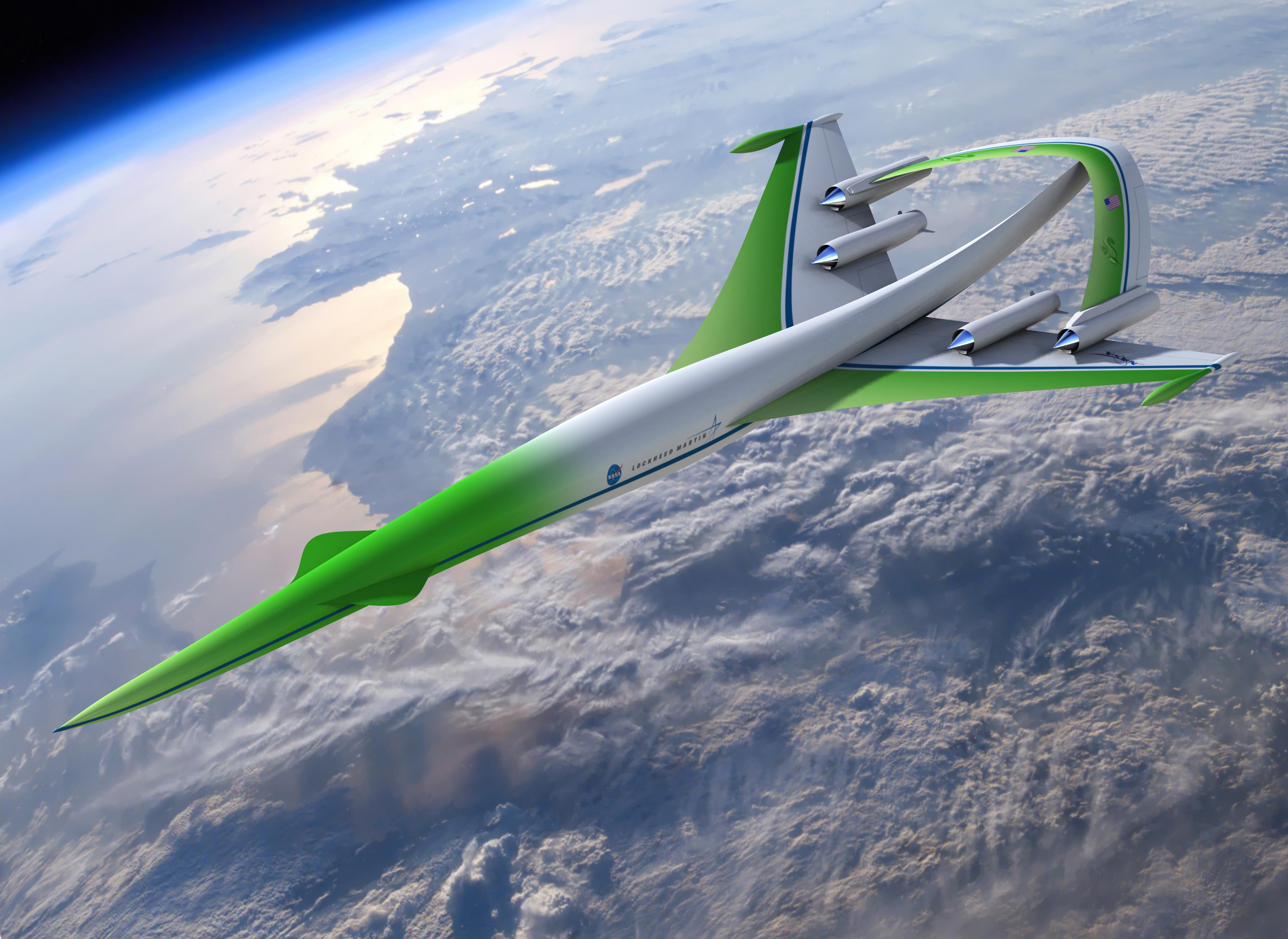
Lockheed Martin concept presented to NASA Aeronautics Research Mission Directorate in April 2010

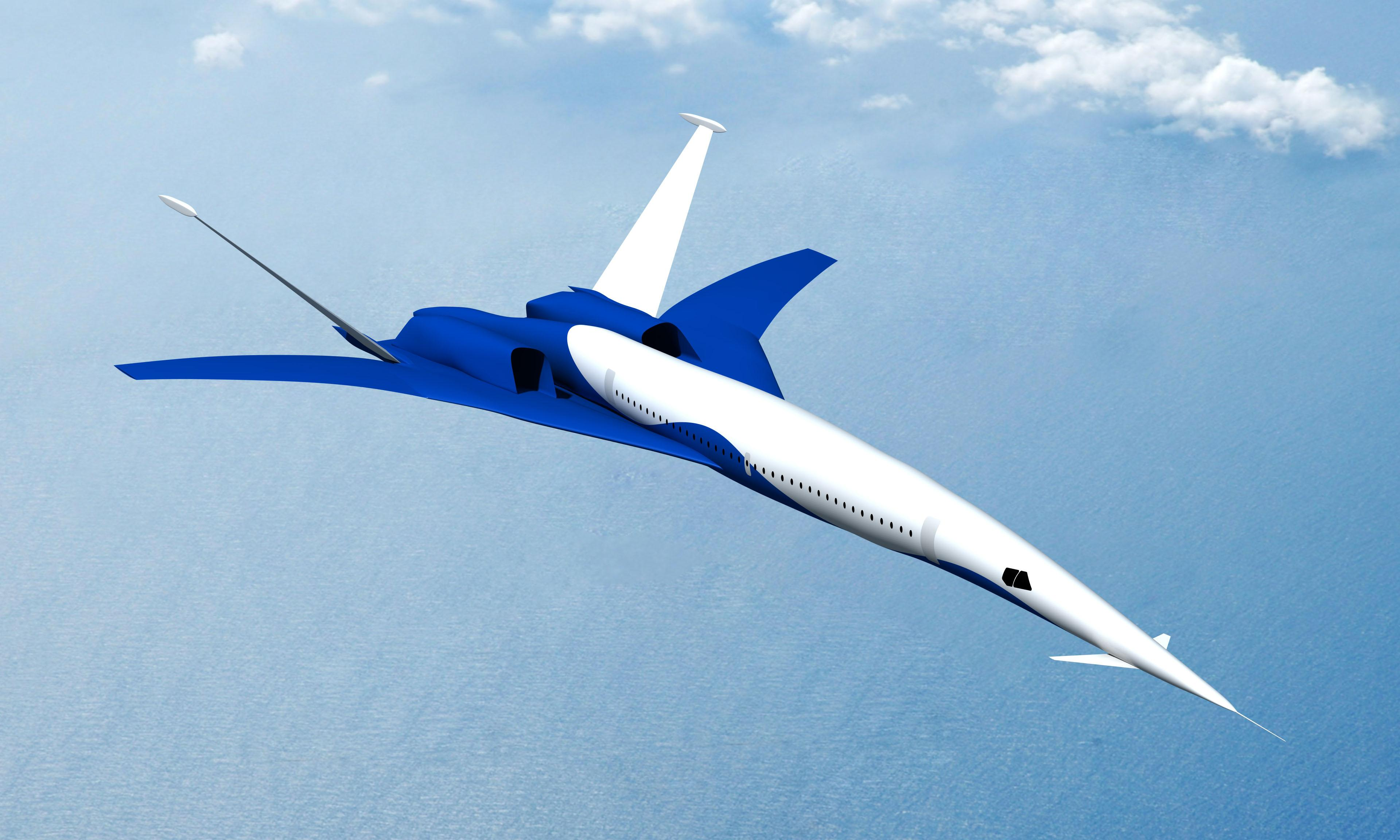
Boeing concept presented to NASA Aeronautics Research Mission Directorate in April 2010

The desire for a second-generation supersonic aircraft has remained within some elements of the aviation industry, and several concepts have emerged since the retirement of Concorde.

According to Aviation Week, the market for supersonic airliners costing $200 million could be 1,300 over a 10-year period, worth $260 billion. Development and certification is probably a $4 billion operation.

=== Previous concepts ===
1/10-scale model of a McDonnell Douglas Mach 2.2 transport in 1992, part of NASA High-Speed Research Program

In November 2003, EADS—the parent company of Airbus—announced that it was considering working with Japanese companies to develop a larger, faster replacement for Concorde. In October 2005, JAXA, the Japan Aerospace eXploration Agency, undertook aerodynamic testing of a scale model of an airliner designed to carry 300 passengers at Mach 2 (Next Generation Supersonic Transport, NEXST, then Zero Emission Hyper Sonic Transport). If pursued to commercial deployment, it was expected to be in service around 2020–25.

In May 2008, it was reported that Aerion Corporation had $3 billion of pre-order sales on its Aerion SBJ supersonic business jet. In late 2010, the project continued with a testbed flight of a section of the wing. The Aerion AS2 was proposed as a 12-seat trijet, with a range of 4,750 nmi (8,800 km; 5,470 mi) at Mach 1.4 over water or 5,300 nmi (9,800 km; 6,100 mi) at Mach 0.95 over land, although "boomless" Mach 1.1 flight was claimed to be possible. Backed by Airbus and with 20 launch orders from Flexjet, first deliveries were pushed back from 2023 by two years when GE Aviation was selected in May 2017 for a joint engine study. In May 2021 the company announced that they would be ceasing operations due to inability to raise capital.

The SAI Quiet Supersonic Transport is a 12-passenger design from Lockheed Martin that is to cruise at Mach 1.6, and is to create a sonic boom only 1% as strong as that generated by Concorde.

The supersonic Tupolev Tu-444 or Gulfstream X-54 have also been proposed.

=== 2016–present ===
In March 2016, Boom Technology revealed that it is in the development phases of building a 40-passenger supersonic jet capable of flying Mach 1.7, claiming that the design simulation shows that it will be quieter and 30% more efficient than the Concorde and will be able to fly Los Angeles to Sydney in 6 hours. It is planned to go into service in 2029.

For its economic viability, NASA research since 2006 has focused on reducing the sonic boom to allow supersonic flight over land. In 2016, NASA announced it had signed a contract for the design of a modern low-noise SST prototype. The designing team is led by Lockheed Martin Aeronautics. NASA should fly a low-boom demonstrator in 2019, reduced from double bangs to soft thumps by airframe shaping, to inquire community response, in support of a prospective FAA and ICAO ban lift in the early 2020s. The Lockheed Martin X-59 QueSST X-plane will mimic the shockwave signature of a Mach 1.6 to 1.8, 80- to 100-seat airliner for 75 PNLdB compared with 105 PNLdB for Concorde.

The TsAGI exhibited at the 2017 MAKS Air Show in Moscow a scale model of its Supersonic Business Jet / Commercial Jet which should produce a low sonic boom permitting supersonic flight over land, optimised for 2,100 km/h (1,300 mph) cruise and 7,400–8,600 km (4,600–5,300 mi) range. The scientific research aims to optimise for both Mach 0.8–0.9 transonic and Mach 1.5–2.0 supersonic speeds, a similar design is tested in a wind tunnel while the engines are conceptualised at the Central Institute for Aviation Motors and designs are studied by Aviadvigatel and NPO Saturn.

At the October 2017 NBAA convention in Las Vegas, with NASA supporting only research, various companies faced engineering challenges to propose aircraft with no engine available, variable top speeds and operating models:

- The Boom XB-1 Baby Boom third-scale testbed, first test flown on March 22, 2024, the aircraft is powered by three General Electric J-85-15 turbojets. On January 28, 2025, the aircraft reached speeds of Mach 1.122, making it the first human-piloted civil supersonic flight in an aircraft using an air-breathing engine since Concorde's retirement.
- The Spike S-512 is a self-funded twinjet design aiming to cruise at Mach 1.6 over water for 6,200 nmi (11,500 km; 7,100 mi) with 22 passengers in a windowless cabin, with unspecified 20,000 lbf (89 kN) engines. An SX-1.2-scale model was expected to have made its maiden flight in September 2017 before a manned testbed in 2019 and the prototype in 2021, with market availability for 2023 but so far, the airframe is still under development and the company have still not released any further information regarding what powerplant they plan to use.

Model	Passengers	Cruise	Range (nmi)	MTOW	Total Thrust	Thrust/weight
Tupolev Tu-144	150	Mach 2.0	3,500 nmi (6,500 km)	207 t (456,000 lb)	960 kN (216,000 lbf)	0.44
Concorde	120	Mach 2.02	3,900 nmi (7,200 km)	185 t (408,000 lb)	676 kN (152,000 lbf)	0.37
Boom Overture	64-80	Mach 1.7	4,250 nmi (7,870 km)	77.1 t (170,000 lb)	200–270 kN (45,000–60,000 lbf)	0.26–0.35

Of the four billion air passengers in 2017, over 650 million flew long-haul between 2,000 and 7,000 miles (3,200 and 11,300 km), including 72 million in business and first class, reaching 128 million by 2025; Spike projects 13 million would be interested in supersonic transport then.

In October 2018, the reauthorization of the FAA planned noise standards for supersonic transports, giving developers a regulatory certainty for their designs, mostly their engine choice. Rules for supersonic flight-testing authorization in the U.S. and noise certification will be proposed by the FAA by early 2019. The FAA should make a proposition for landing-and-takeoff noise before March 31, 2020, for a rule after 2022; and for overland sonic boom from the end of 2020, while NASA plans to fly the Lockheed Martin X-59 QueSST low-boom flight demonstrator from 2021 for ICAO standards in 2025.

In June 2019, inspired by the NASA quiet supersonic initiative and X-59 QueSST, Lockheed Martin unveiled the Quiet Supersonic Technology Airliner, a Mach 1.8, transpacific airliner concept for 40 passengers. Lower airport noise and sonic boom are allowed by shaped-boom design; integrated low-noise propulsion; swept-wing supersonic natural laminar flow; and the cockpit external vision system (XVS). The 225 ft (69 m) long design is significantly longer than the Concorde, featuring an almost 70 ft (21 m) long nose and a 78 ft (24 m) cabin. The sharply swept delta wing has a 73 ft (22 m) span, slightly narrower than the Concorde.

Design goals are a 4,200–5,300 nmi (7,800–9,800 km) range and a 9,500–10,500 ft (2,900–3,200 m) takeoff field length, a 75-80 PLdB sonic boom and a cruise of Mach 1.6–1.7 over land and Mach 1.7-1.8 over water. Twin tail-mounted nonafterburning 40,000 lbf (180 kN) engines are located between V-tails. Integrated low-noise propulsion include advanced plug nozzle designs, noise shielding concepts and distortion-tolerant fan blades.

In 2019, Exosonic, Inc was founded with the goal of developing a 70-passenger supersonic jet capable of flying Mach 1.8 and with a range of 5,000 nmi (9,300 km; 5,800 mi). The company was aiming to introduce the jet commercially in the 2030s. In April 2021, Exosonic was awarded a contract to develop a supersonic jet which could have been used for Air Force One. The company announced it was closing down in November 2024.

In August 2020, Virgin Galactic with Rolls-Royce unveiled the concept of a Mach 3 capable twinjet delta wing aircraft that can carry up to 19 passengers.

NASA is working with 2 teams led by Boeing and Northrop Grumman on developing concepts for a Mach 4 airliner.

In April 2024, Boom received FAA licensure for Mach 1 and beyond tests of its XB-1 to be conducted at the Black Mountain Supersonic Corridor, in Mojave, California.

In June 2025, US President Donald Trump signed an executive order that would include directing the "Administrator of the Federal Aviation Administration (FAA) to repeal the prohibition on overland supersonic flight".

=== Hypersonic transport ===
While conventional turbo and ramjet engines are able to remain reasonably efficient up to Mach 5.5, some ideas for very high-speed flight above Mach 6 are also sometimes discussed, with the aim of reducing travel times down to one or two hours anywhere in the world. These vehicle proposals very typically either use rocket or scramjet engines; pulse detonation engines have also been proposed. There are many difficulties with such flight, both technical and economic.

Rocket-engined vehicles, while technically practical (either as ballistic transports or as semiballistic transports using wings), would use a very large amount of propellant and operate best at speeds between about Mach 8 and orbital speeds. Rockets compete best with air-breathing jet engines on cost at very long range; however, even for antipodal travel, costs would be only somewhat lower than orbital launch costs.

At the June 2011 Paris Air Show, EADS unveiled its ZEHST concept, cruising at Mach 4 (4,400 km/h; 2,400 kn) at 105,000 ft (32,000 m) and attracting Japanese interest. The German SpaceLiner is a suborbital hypersonic winged passenger spaceplane project under preliminary development.

Precooled jet engines are jet engines with a heat exchanger at the inlet that cools the air at very high speeds. These engines may be practical and efficient at up to about Mach 5.5, and this is an area of research in Europe and Japan. The British company Reaction Engines Limited, with 50% EU money, has been engaged in a research programme called LAPCAT, which examined a design for a hydrogen-fueled plane carrying 300 passengers called the A2, potentially capable of flying at Mach 5+ nonstop from Brussels to Sydney in 4.6 hours. The follow-on research effort, LAPCAT II began in 2008 and was to last four years.

STRATOFLY MR3 is an EU research program (German Aerospace Center, ONERA and universities) with the goal of developing a cryogenic fuel 300-passenger airliner capable to fly at about 10,000 km/h (Mach 8) above 30 km of altitude.

Destinus, Hermeus, and Venus Aerospace are developing hypersonic passenger aircraft.

Boeing hypersonic transport concept

Boeing unveiled at the AIAA 2018 conference a Mach 6 (6,500 km/h; 3,500 kn) passenger airliner. Crossing the Atlantic in 2 hours or the Pacific in 3 at 100,000 ft (30 km) would enable same-day return flights, increasing airlines' asset utilization. Using a titanium airframe, its capacity would be smaller than a Boeing 737 but larger than a long-range business jet. A reusable demonstrator could be flown as early as 2023 or 2024 for a potential entry into service from the late 2030s. Aerodynamics would benefit from the Boeing X-51 Waverider experience, riding the leading edge shockwave for lower induced drag. Flow control would enhance lift at slower speeds, and avoiding afterburners on takeoff would reduce noise. The Boeing hypersonic airliner would be powered by a turboramjet, a turbofan that transitions to a ramjet at Mach 6 would avoid the need for a scramjet, similar to the SR-71 Blackbird's Pratt & Whitney J58, but shutting off the turbine at higher speeds. It would be integrated in an axisymmetric annular layout with a single intake and nozzle, and a bypass duct around the turbine engine to a combination afterburner/ramjet at the rear. It would need advanced cooling technology like the heat exchanger developed by Reaction Engines, maybe using liquid methane and/or jet fuel. Cruising at 90,000–100,000 feet (27,000–30,000 m) makes depressurization a higher risk. Mach 6 was chosen as the limit achievable with available technology. It would have a high capacity utilization, being able to cross the Atlantic four or five times a day, up from a possible twice a day with the Concorde.

== See also ==
- List of supersonic aircraft
- Supercruise
