= Oklahoma City sonic boom tests =

1964 FAA sonic boom study over Oklahoma City

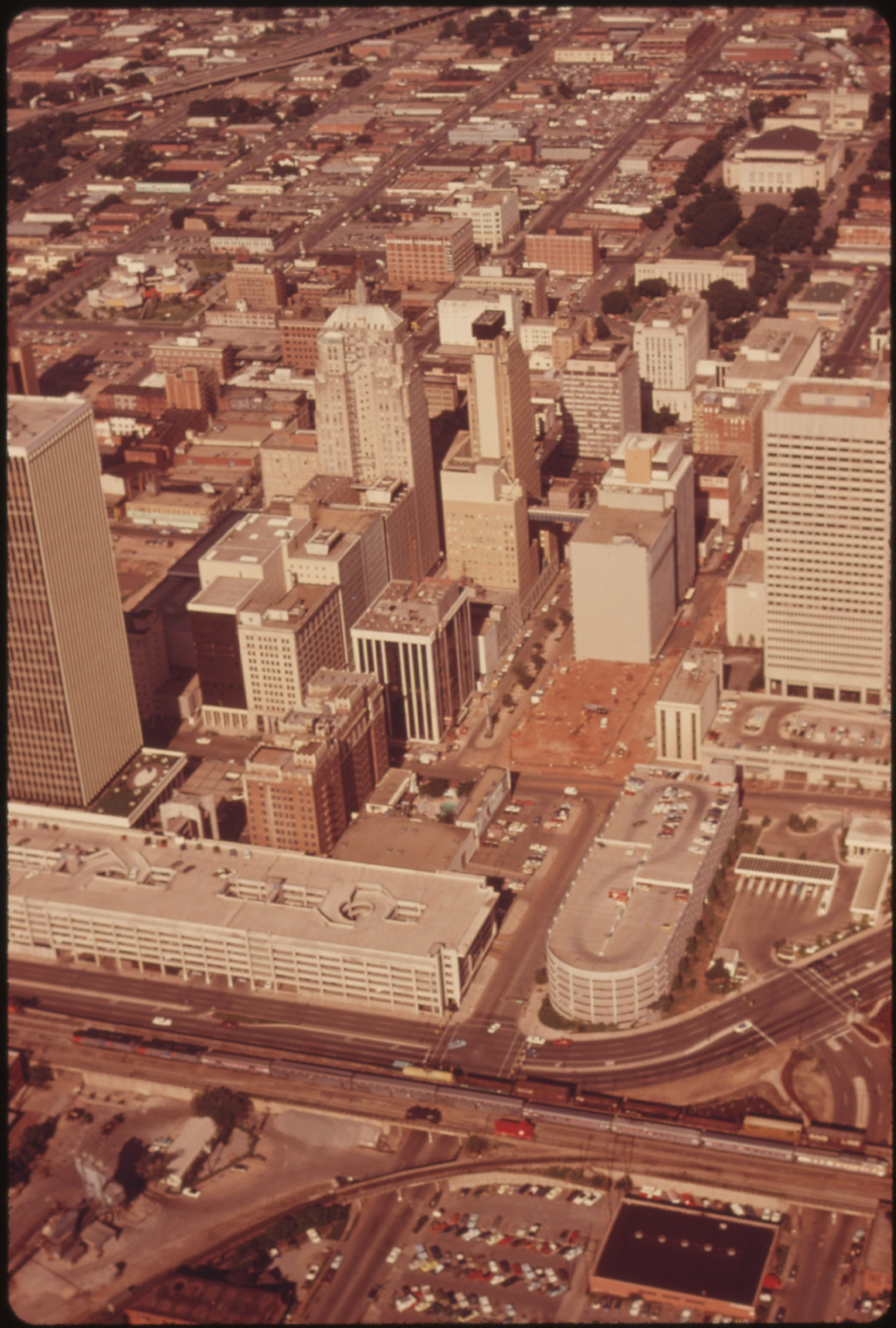
Aerial view of Oklahoma City (1974 photograph)

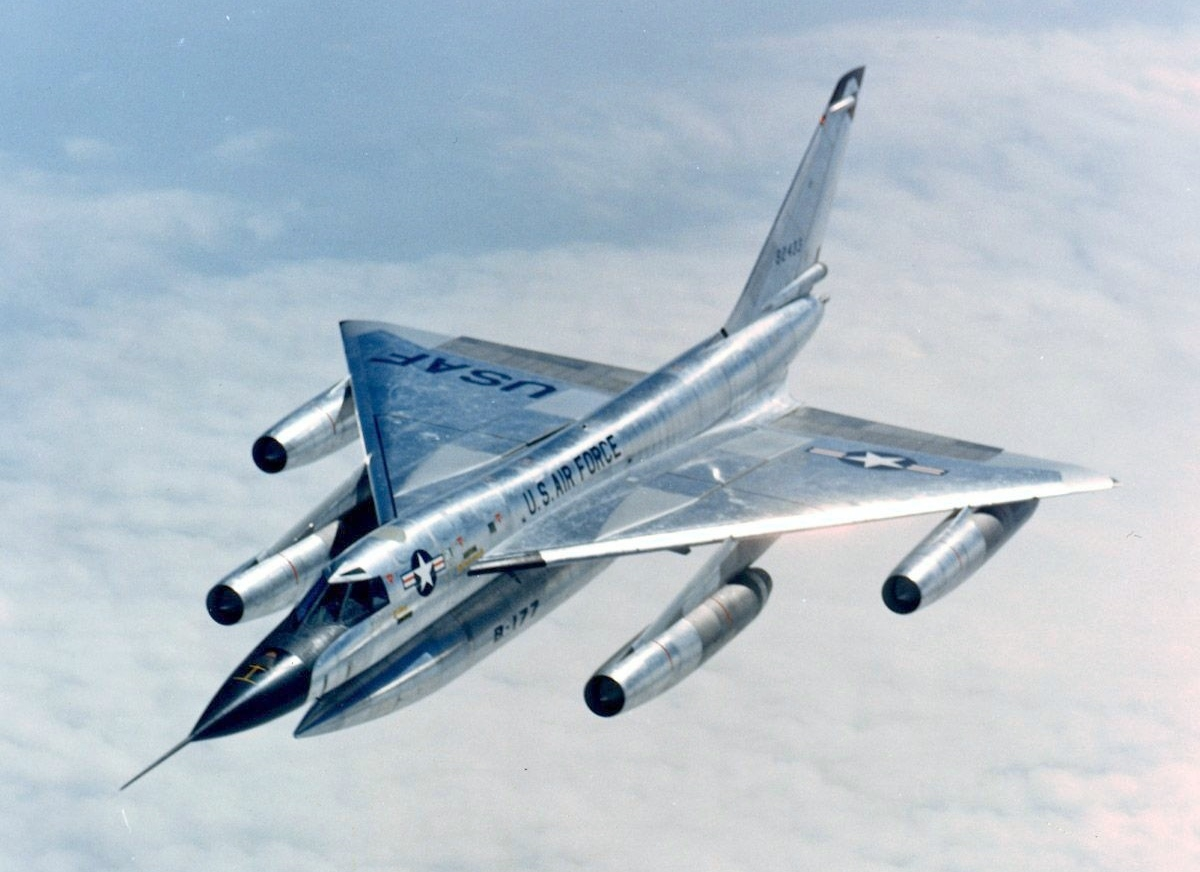
A Convair B-58 Hustler, one of the airplane models used in the Oklahoma City sonic boom tests

The Oklahoma City sonic boom tests, also known as Operation Bongo II, refer to a controversial experiment, organized by the Federal Aviation Administration (FAA), in which 1,253 sonic booms were generated over Oklahoma City, Oklahoma, over a period of six months starting in February 1964. The experiment was intended to quantify the effects of transcontinental supersonic transport (SST) aircraft on a city, to measure the booms' effect on structures and public attitude, and to develop standards for boom prediction and insurance data.

Oklahoma City's population was perceived to be relatively tolerant of such an experiment, as it had an economic dependency on the nearby Mike Monroney Aeronautical Center and Tinker Air Force Base; and, in fact, the local Chamber of Commerce threw a celebratory dinner when Oklahoma was selected.

Despite this the testing was stopped early, in the wake of damage complaints, and although the final report said that "the overwhelming majority felt they could learn to live with the numbers and kinds of booms experienced", the FAA's poor handling of complaints led to a class action lawsuit against the U.S. government. The negative publicity associated with the tests partially influenced the 1971 cancellation of the Boeing 2707 project and the severe restriction of commercial supersonic flight in the United States.

== Testing ==
Starting on February 3, 1964, the first sonic booms began, eight booms per day that began at 7 a.m. and ended in the afternoon. The Air Force used F-104 fighter and B-58 bomber aircraft to produce the booms, along with the occasional F-101 and F-106.

The noise was limited to 1.0 to 1.5 pound-force per square foot (48 to 72 pascal) for the first twelve weeks, then increased to 1.5 to 2.0 psf (72 to 96 pascal) for the final fourteen weeks. This range was about equal to that expected from an SST. Though eight booms per day were harsh, the peak overpressures of 2.0 psf were supposedly an order of magnitude lower than that needed to shatter glass, and are considered marginally irritating according to published standards.

Oklahomans initially took the tests in stride. This was chalked up to the booms being predictable and coming at specific times. An FAA-hired camera crew, filming a group of construction workers, were surprised to find that the booms signaled their lunch break.

However, in the first 14 weeks, 147 windows in the city's two tallest buildings, the First National Bank and Liberty National Bank, were broken. By late spring, organized civic groups were already springing into action, but were rebuffed by city politicians, who asked them to show legislators their support. An attempt to lodge an injunction against the tests was denied by district court Judge Stephen Chandler, who said that the plaintiffs could not establish that they suffered any mental or physical harm and that the tests were a vital national need. A restraining order was then sought, which brought a pause to the tests on May 13 until it was decided that the court had exceeded its authority.

Pressure mounted from within. The federal Bureau of the Budget lambasted the FAA about poor experiment design, while complaints flooded into U.S. Senator Mike Monroney's office. Finally, East Coast newspapers began to pick up the issue, turning on the national spotlight. On June 6 the Saturday Review published an article titled The Era of Supersonic Morality, which criticized the manner in which the FAA had targeted a city without consulting local government. By July, The Washington Post reported on the turmoil at the local and state level in Oklahoma. Oklahoma City Council members were finally beginning to respond to citizen complaints and put pressure on Washington.

The pressure put a premature end to the tests. On July 30, the tests were over. An Oklahoma City Times headline reported: "Silence is deafening!" Zhivko D. Angeluscheff, a prominent hearing specialist serving with the National Academy of Sciences, recalled: "I was witness to the fact that men were executing their brethren during six long months ... with their thunder, the sonic boom, they were punishing all living creatures on earth."

== Results ==
Public opinion measurement was subcontracted to the National Opinion Research Center (NORC) of the University of Chicago, and their report was released beginning in February 1965. The FAA was displeased by the overly academic style of the report, but stressed the positive findings, saying "the overwhelming majority felt they could learn to live with the numbers and kinds of booms experienced." Indeed, the NORC reported that 73% of subjects in the study said that they could live indefinitely with eight sonic booms per day, while a quarter said that they could not. About 3% of the population telephoned, sued, or wrote protest letters, but Oklahoma City surgeons and hospitals filed no complaints.

However, with the city population at 500,000, that 3% figure represented 15,000 upset individuals. There were 9,594 complaints of damage to buildings, 4,629 formal damage claims, and 229 claims for a total of $12,845.32, mostly for broken glass and cracked plaster. The FAA rejected 94% of all the claims it received, fueling a rising tide of anger that soared even after the experiment's conclusion. By 1965, Senator Monroney had grown extremely upset over hundreds of letters from his constituents complaining about the FAA's "cavalier manner" of dismissing claims, and began demanding frequent reports from the agency. As late as May 1966, the FAA was still attempting to respond to all of Monroney's inquiries. The SST program lost all support from Monroney, who had initially been a key supporter.

The Oklahoma City experiments were partly to blame for weakening the FAA's authority in sonic boom issues. After the tests, President Lyndon B. Johnson's presidential advisory committee transferred matters of policy from the FAA to the National Academy of Sciences. Secretary of the Interior Stewart Udall complained that the NAS did not include one environmental preservationist, and pointed out that although the Oklahoma City tests were stacked in favor of the SST, they were still extremely negative. Indeed, by 1966, national grassroots campaigns against sonic booms were beginning to affect public policy.

The FAA's poor handling of claims and its payout of only $123,000 led to a class action lawsuit against the U.S. government. On March 8, 1969, the government lost its appeal. The negative publicity associated with the tests partially influenced the 1971 cancellation of the Boeing 2707 project and led to the United States' complete withdrawal from SST design.

== See also ==
- Human experimentation in the United States
