= Lockheed Martin X-59 Quesst =

Experimental supersonic aircraft for NASA

X-59 Quesst
- X-59 cruises above Palmdale and Edwards AFB, California, during its first flight

General information
- Type: Experimental supersonic aircraft
- National origin: United States
- Manufacturer: Lockheed Martin
- Status: In testing
- Primary user: NASA

History
- First flight: October 28, 2025

The Lockheed Martin X-59 Quesst ("Quiet SuperSonic Technology"), sometimes styled QueSST, is an American experimental supersonic aircraft under development by Lockheed Martin for NASA's Low-Boom Flight Demonstrator project, evaluating the possibility of supersonic flight without the drawback of loud sonic booms. Preliminary design started in February 2016, with the X-59 originally planned to begin flight testing in 2021. After repeated delays, it began flight testing in late October 2025.

It is expected to cruise at Mach 1.42 (1,510 km/h; 937 mph) at an altitude of 55,000 ft (16,800 m). It is designed to create only a low 75 effective perceived noise level (EPNdB) thump to re-evaluate the viability of supersonic transport, since their extremely loud sonic booms were one of the main reasons previous supersonic aircraft such as the Concorde were retired.

== Development ==
In February 2016, Lockheed Martin was awarded a preliminary design contract, aiming to begin flights in the 2020 timeframe. A 9% scale model was to be wind tunnel tested from Mach 0.3 to 1.6 between February and April 2017. The preliminary design review was planned to be completed by June 2017. While NASA received three inquiries for its August 2017 request for proposals, Lockheed was the sole bidder.

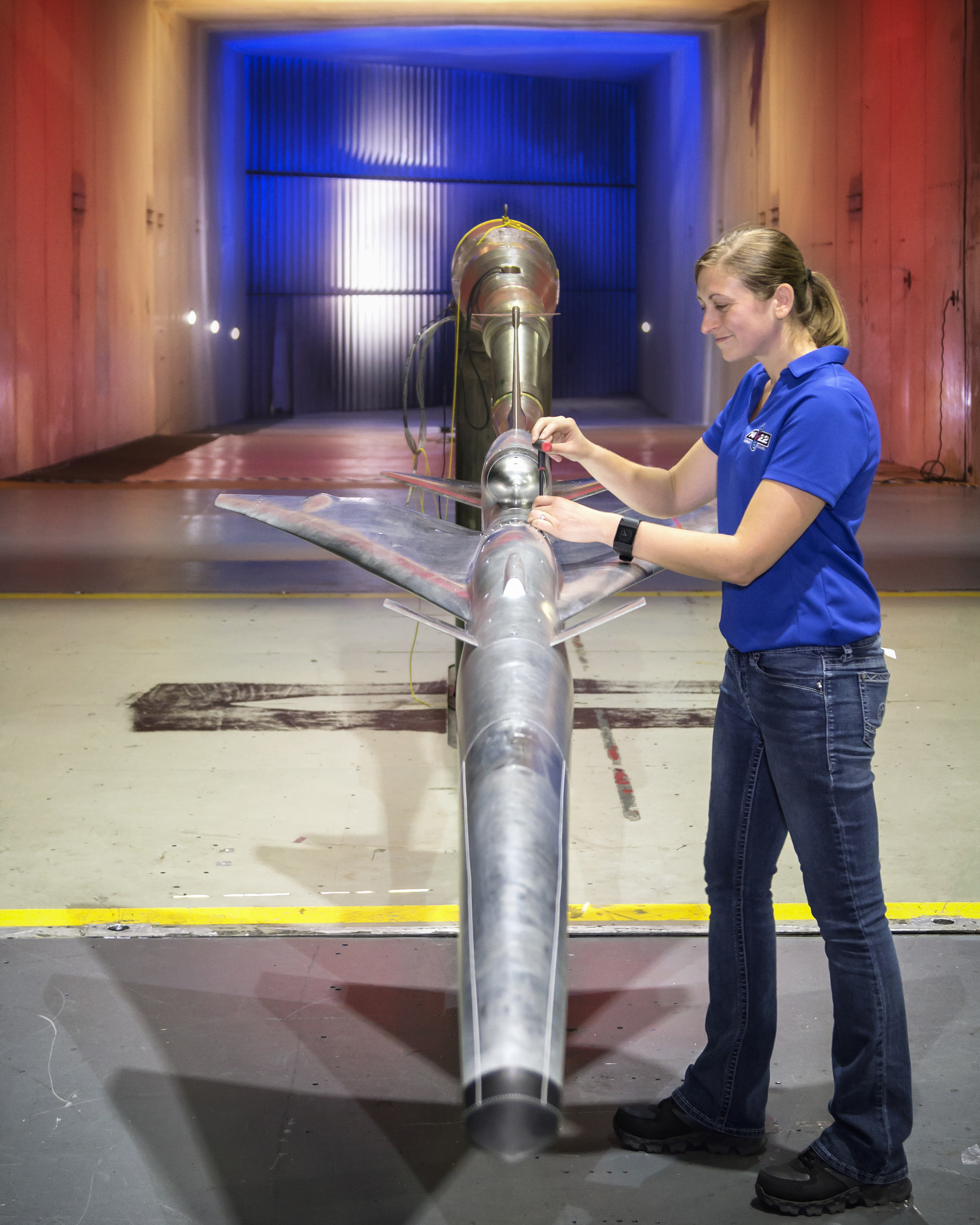
A model in a wind tunnel at NASA Langley, September 2017

On April 2, 2018, NASA awarded Lockheed Martin a $247.5 million contract to design, build, and deliver the Low-Boom X-plane by late 2021. On June 26, 2018, the U.S. Air Force informed NASA it had assigned the demonstrator the designation X-59 QueSST. By October, three weeks of wind-tunnel testing at NASA Langley had been completed on an 8% scale model, with high angles of attacks (AOAs) up to 50° and 88° at very low speed, up from 13° in previous tunnel tests. Testing was for static stability and control and dynamic forced oscillations, as well as laser flow visualization, expanding on previous experimental and computational predictions.

From November 5, 2018, NASA was scheduled to begin tests of the effects of supersonic thumps over the course of two weeks to gather feedback. To simulate the thump, an F/A-18 Hornet was to dive from 50,000 ft (15,200 m) briefly to go supersonic, creating reduced shock waves over Galveston, Texas (an island city), as well as a stronger boom over water. Up to eight thumps a day were produced at different locations, monitored by 20 noise sensors and described by 400 residents, who would receive a $25-per-week compensation. By this stage, Lockheed Martin had begun machining the first parts in Palmdale, California.

In May 2019, the initial major structural parts were loaded in the tooling assembly. In June, assembly was getting underway. The external vision system was flight tested on a King Air at NASA Langley, using cameras and screens to display a forward view due to the obstruction of the unusually long nose cone. This was to be followed by high speed wind tunnel tests to verify inlet performance predictions with a 9.5% scale model at NASA Glenn Research Center.

The critical design review was successfully held in September 2019, before the IRB report to NASA's Integrated Aviation Systems Program by November. After this, 80–90% of the drawings were released to engineering. The wing assembly was to be completed in 2020. In December 2020, construction was halfway completed, with the maiden flight then planned for 2022.

After flight-clearance testing at the Armstrong Flight Research Center, an acoustic validation including air-to-air Schlieren imaging backlit by the Sun to confirm the shockwave pattern testing was then slated to be done through September 2022. NASA planned to conduct flight tests over U.S. cities to verify the safety and performance of the X-59's quiet supersonic technologies and evaluate community responses for regulators, which could enable commercial supersonic travel over land.

In 2018, community-response flight tests starting in 2023–2025 were planned to be used for ICAO's Committee on Aviation Environmental Protection meeting establishing a sonic boom standard. As of 2022, the results of the community overflights were slated to be delivered to the ICAO and the Federal Aviation Administration in 2027, allowing for a decision to be made to revise the rules on commercial supersonic travel over land in 2028.

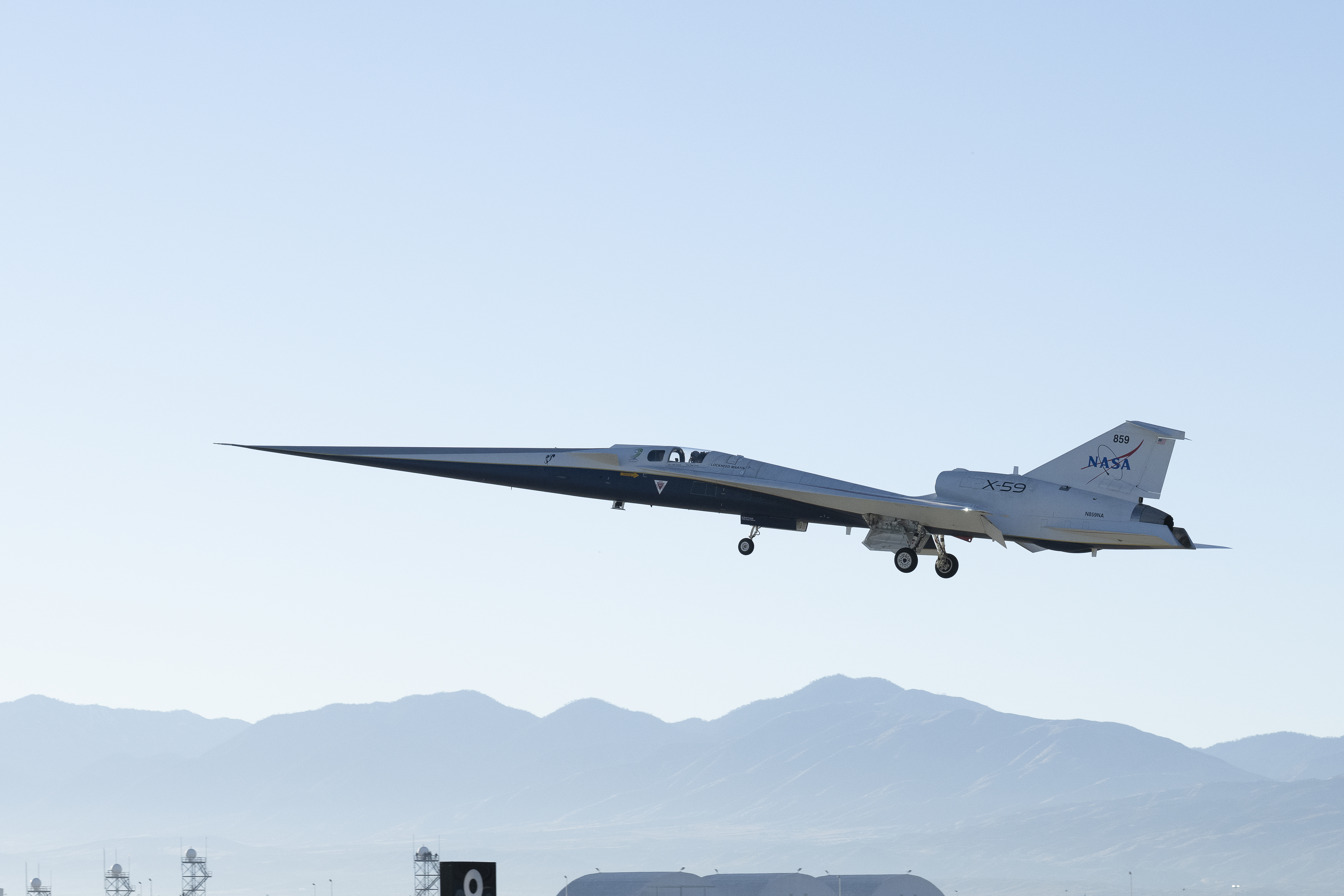
The X-59's first flight on October 28, 2025

NASA reported the installation of the General Electric F414-GE-100 engine on the X-59, which took place at Lockheed Martin's Skunk Works in Palmdale, California, in early November 2022. The engine is 13 feet (4.0 m) long and produces 22,000 pounds-force (98 kN) of thrust. The X-59's first flight was planned for 2024.

Lockheed Martin released a video showing an assembled X-59 rolling out of a hangar on August 4, 2023. The corporation unveiled the X-59 on January 12, 2024. In November 2024, the X-59's engine was tested for the first time, with plans for the aircraft's first flight to take place in 2025. Testing of the craft and ground equipment began with a self-powered taxi on July 17, 2025, and a test of the ground instruments using an F-15B on July 25, 2025, with plans to continue ground testing over the following weeks.

The X-59 took its maiden flight in the morning of October 28, 2025, from Air Force Plant 42 and landed around an hour later at NASA's Armstrong Flight Research Center in Edwards Air Force Base. The aircraft remained subsonic for this initial flight, reportedly reaching 230 mph at an altitude of 12,000 feet. On April 3, 2026 the X-59 completed its first wheels-up flight, reaching 20,000 feet and around 460 mph. On June 5, 2026, the X-59 went supersonic to about Mach 1.1 for the first time. One week later, it reached Mach 1.4.

== Design ==
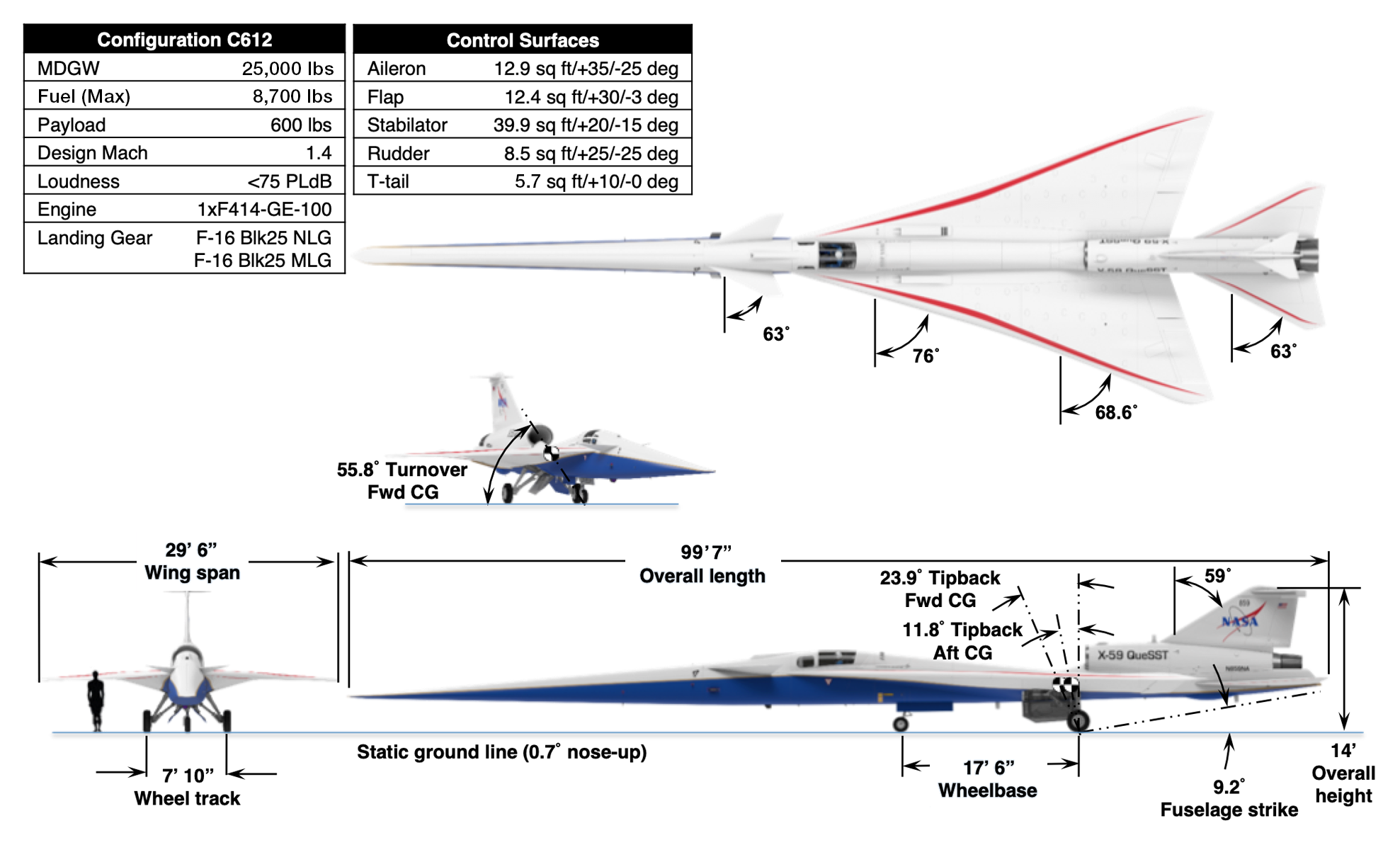
X-59 multi-view figure

The Low-Boom X-plane is 99.7 ft (30.4 m) long with a 29.5 ft (9.0 m) wingspan for a maximum takeoff weight of 32,300 lb (14,700 kg). Propelled by a General Electric F414 engine, it should reach a maximum speed of Mach 1.5 or 990 mph (1,590 km/h), and cruise at Mach 1.42 or 940 mph (1,510 km/h) at 55,000 ft (16,800 m). The cockpit, ejection seat, and canopy come from a Northrop T-38, and the landing gear was from an F-16. With afterburner, its engine provides 22,000 lbf (98 kN) of thrust.

As of 2017, the ground noise was expected to be around 60 dB(A), about 1/1000 as loud as current supersonic aircraft. This was to be achieved by using a long, narrow airframe and canards to keep the shock waves from coalescing. A 2018 projection revised this figure, estimating that the aircraft would create a 75 EPNdB thump on ground, as loud as closing a car door, which would be around 1/16 as noisy as the 105-110 EPNdB boom made by Concorde (since decibels are a logarithmic scale). The central engine has a top-mounted intake for low boom, but inlet flow distortion due to vortices is a concern.

The flush cockpit means that the long and pointed nose cone obstructs all forward vision. The X-59 uses an enhanced flight vision system (EVS), consisting of a forward 4K camera with a 33° by 19° angle of view, which compensates for the lack of forward visibility.

In January 2019, RTX Corporation subsidiary Collins Aerospace was selected to supply its Pro Line Fusion cockpit avionics for displaying the boom on the ground, and EVS with long-wave infrared sensors. The Collins EVS-3600 multispectral imaging system, beneath the nose, is used for landing, while the NASA external vision system, in front of the cockpit, gives a forward view.

== See also ==
- Boom XB-1
- Quiet Spike
- Gulfstream X-54
- Shaped Sonic Boom Demonstration

Related lists

- List of X-planes
