= Shaped Sonic Boom Demonstration =

Experimental derivative of Northrop F-5E fighter

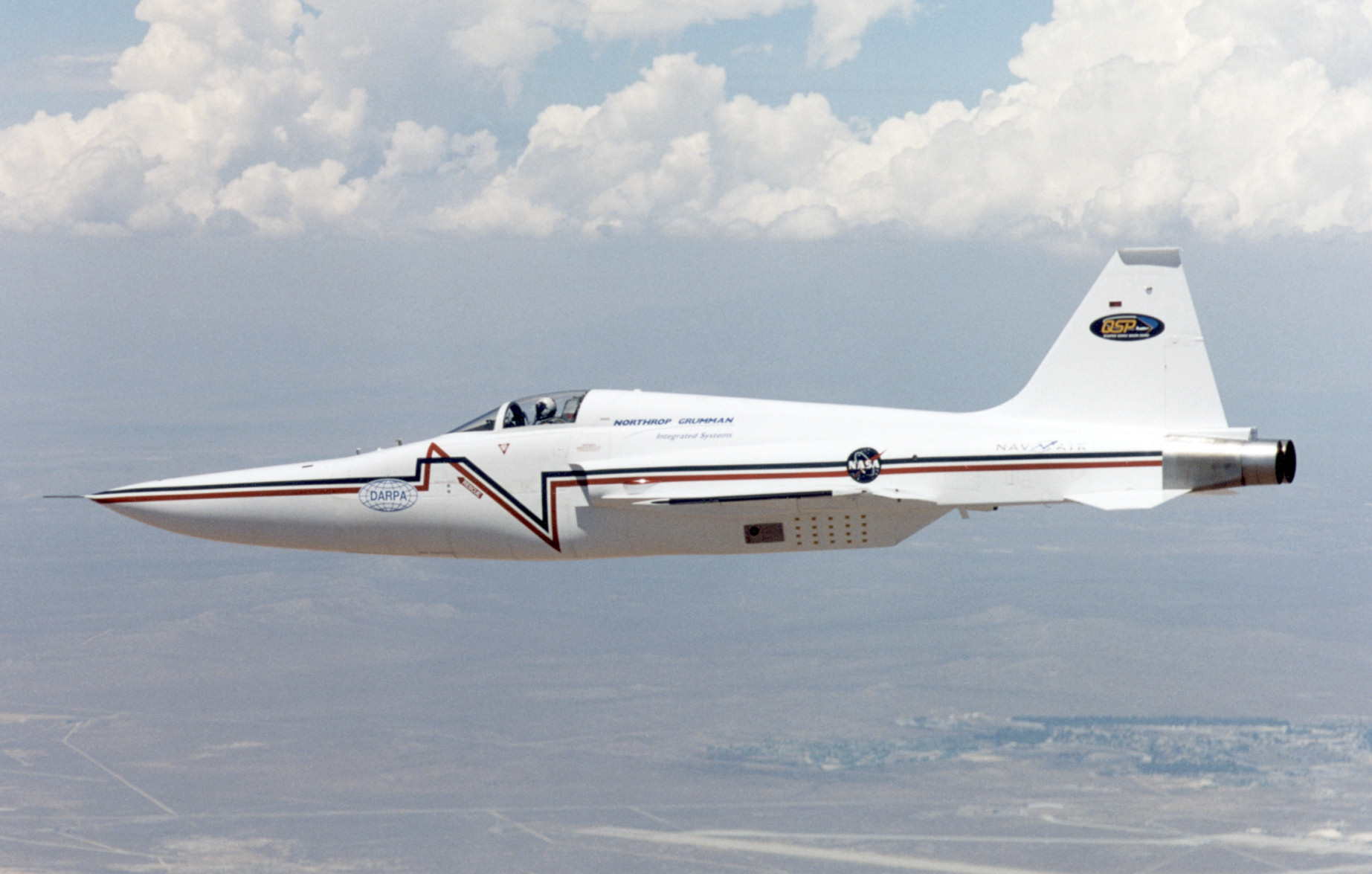
This F-5E was modified by NASA for a constant area beyond drag optimum to reduce the sonic boom

The NASA Shaped Sonic Boom Demonstration, also known as the Shaped Sonic Boom Experiment, was a two-year program that used a Northrop F-5E with a modified fuselage to demonstrate that the aircraft's shock wave, and accompanying sonic boom, can be shaped, and thereby reduced. The program was a joint effort between NASA's Langley Research Center, Dryden Flight Research Center at Edwards Air Force Base, California and Northrop Grumman.

The program became, at that time (2003), the most extensive study on the sonic boom. After measuring the 1,300 recordings, some taken inside the shock wave by a chase plane, the SSBD demonstrated a reduction in boom by about one-third. Several of the flights included NASA Dryden's F-15B research testbed aircraft following to measure the F-5E's shock wave signature close-up. During the flights, many shock wave patterns were measured by the F-15B at various distances and orientations from the F-5E.

An unmodified F-5E flew a few seconds behind the demonstration aircraft to provide a baseline sonic boom measurement to validate the reduced boom produced by the demonstrator.

A U.S. Air Force Test Pilot School Blanik L-23 glider carrying a microphone on the left wingtip, and a pressure transducer on the side of the fuselage, flew at a lower altitude of 10,000 feet (3,000 m) under the path of the F-5E, which flew at 32,000 feet (9,800 m), to record sonic booms in the air. In addition, sonic boom data were gathered on the ground by an array of 42 sensors and recording devices along 2.5 miles (4.0 km) under the flight path of the F-5E. Dryden-developed boom amplitude and direction sensors recorded ground-level sonic boom signature data.

The demonstration was initially part of the Quiet Supersonic Platform program funded by Defense Advanced Research Projects Agency (DARPA). Subsequently, the vehicle systems division of NASA's Office of Aeronautics funded the project. Northrop-Grumman Corporation's Integrated Systems Sector in El Segundo, California in conjunction with Aerospace Systems Sector in Saint Augustine, Florida, modified the U.S. Navy F-5E aircraft into the SSBD aircraft. The aircraft is on display at the Valiant Air Command Warbird Museum at Titusville, Florida.

== See also ==
- Supersonic aerodynamics
- Whitcomb area rule
- Sound barrier
- Mach number
- Quiet Spike
- Low Boom Flight Demonstrator
- Gulfstream X-54
