= Overpressure =

Pressure due to a shockwave

Overpressure (or blast overpressure) is the pressure caused by a shock wave over and above normal atmospheric pressure. The shock wave may be caused by sonic boom or by explosion, and the resulting overpressure receives particular attention when measuring the effects of nuclear weapons or thermobaric bombs.

== Effects ==
According to an article in the journal Toxicological Sciences,

Blast overpressure (BOP), also known as high energy impulse noise, is a damaging outcome of explosive detonations and firing of weapons. Exposure to BOP shock waves alone results in injury predominantly to the hollow organ systems such as auditory, respiratory, and gastrointestinal systems.

An EOD suit worn by bomb disposal experts can protect against the effects of BOP.

Overpressure psi (kPa; bar)	Effect on buildings and people within
1 (6.9; 0.069)	Window glass shatters; Light injuries from fragments occur
2 (14; 0.14)	Moderate damage to houses (windows and doors blown out and severe damage to roofs); People injured by flying glass and debris
3 (21; 0.21)	Residential structures collapse; Serious injuries are common, fatalities may occur
5 (34; 0.34)	Most buildings collapse except reinforced concrete buildings; Injuries are universal, fatalities are widespread
10 (69; 0.69)	Reinforced concrete buildings severely damaged or demolished; Most people are killed
20 (140; 1.4)	Heavily built reinforced concrete buildings are severely damaged or demolished; Fatalities approach 100%

The above table details the effects of overpressure on the human body in a building affected by a blast of overpressure waves, as clarified later in the journal.

The human body can survive relatively high blast overpressure without experiencing barotrauma. A 5 psi blast overpressure will rupture eardrums in about 1% of subjects, and a 45 psi overpressure will cause eardrum rupture in about 99% of all subjects. The threshold for lung damage occurs at about 15 psi blast overpressure. A 35-45 psi overpressure may cause 1% fatalities, and 55 to 65 psi overpressure may cause 99% fatalities.

According to documents released by the United States Military Defense Technical Information Center (DTIC),

Human beings have about a 50:50 chance of surviving 500 psi, but will probably be severely injured at 70-100 psi. Exposed eardrums will be ruptured 50% of the time at 15 psi. However, a standing man will be blown away at about 10 f/s velocity by a shock of 25 psi peak pressure.

This is for "Instantaneous peak pressure" while the preceding table is for long duration pressure.

== Calculation for an enclosed space ==
Overpressure in an enclosed space is determined using "Weibull's formula":

$$\Delta p = 22.5 \left( {m \over V} \right)^{0.72} \text{bars}$$

where:

- 22.5 is a constant based on experimentation
- $m\,$ = (kilograms) net explosive mass calculated using all explosive materials and their relative effectiveness
- $V\,$ = (cubic meters) volume of given area (primarily used to determine volume within an enclosed space)

== See also ==
- Bomb disposal
