= Hatfield Little Bird =

Little Bird

General information
- Type: Homebuilt aircraft
- National origin: United States of America
- Designer: Milton Hatfield
- Number built: 3

History
- First flight: 26 May 1986 (Little Bird #1)
- Variant: Arup S-2

The Hatfield Little Bird aircraft are a continuation of the Arup series of low aspect ratio aircraft.

== Development ==
In the late 1920s, Cloyd Snyder of South Bend, Indiana, developed a series of "Heel Lift" low aspect ratio aircraft inspired by the gliding properties of felt heel inserts. South Bend native, Milt Hatfield had built a homebuilt aircraft at the same time. Seeking flying lessons while grounded by his father, he donated parts of his aircraft to the Arup S-2 project in exchange for flying lessons. Years later, Hatfield taught the buyer of the S-2 how to fly the plane, and salvaged parts from his own plane to keep it going. After Arup Manufacturing Corporation went out of business, Hatfield promised Snyder he would make one of his own.

== Operational history ==
All three Little Bird aircraft were bought by one owner and are awaiting restoration.

== Variants ==
Hatfield Prototype
A wood and fabric heel lift aircraft started in the 1980s and scrapped.
Hatfield Prototype 2
Another straight winged wood and fabric aircraft scrapped after one flight.
Little Bird #1
An ultralight swept wing heel lift.
Little Bird #2
N7019P A heavier experimental category aircraft. (1988)
Little Bird #3
An advanced ultralight design with a 27hp Rotax.

== Specifications (Little Bird #1) ==
Data from Sport Aviation

General characteristics

- Crew: 1
- Length: 12 ft 6 in (3.81 m)
- Wingspan: 17 ft (5.2 m)
- Wing area: 144 sq ft (13.4 m^{2})
- Empty weight: 248 lb (112 kg)
- Gross weight: 458 lb (208 kg)

Performance

- Cruise speed: 52 kn (60 mph, 97 km/h)
- Stall speed: 22 kn (25 mph, 40 km/h)
- Rate of climb: 450 ft/min (2.3 m/s)
- Wing loading: 3.2 lb/sq ft (16 kg/m^{2})
- Power/mass: 1 hp/17 lb

== See also ==
Related development

- Arup S-1
- Arup S-2
- Arup S-3
- Arup S-4
- Hoffman Flying Wing
