= Circular wing =

Disc-shaped wing

A circular wing is a disc-shaped wing having the outer planform of a circle.

If the aircraft has no fuselage or tail the disc-shaped craft is sometimes described as a flying saucer. If the entire disc rotates it is called a disc wing.

Disc-shaped aircraft development dates back to before World War II. A number of disc-shaped aircraft have been proposed over the years, and a few have been built.

== Circular wing aircraft ==
=== Lee-Richards annular monoplane/biplane ===
Starting in 1910, British aeronautical engineers Cedric Lee and G. Tilghman Richards built and flew a series of aircraft having a novel flat ring-shaped or annular wing, predecessors of the circular wing. Their first flight attempts at an annular biplane in 1911 proved disappointing, the plane would be destroyed in a hangar collapse later that year.

After model tests of a new design showed promising results, they began construction of a full-size annular monoplane, whose maiden flight would occur in 1913, flown by Gordon England. It was found to be stable in the air but tail-heavy. It non-fatally crashed after an engine failure. The group would go on to further improve on the design and build two further annular monoplanes until the outbreak of World War I.

=== Nemeth Umbrella Plane ===
In 1934, at Miami University (of Ohio), an aircraft called the Nemeth Umbrella Plane (aka Roundwing) was tested. (Nemeth is sometimes spelled Nuneth.) This aircraft had a parasol wing of circular form above a conventional fuselage and tail, and it was powered by propeller in a tractor configuration.

=== Sack AS.6 ===
During World War II, a number of disc-shaped aircraft were proposed by aircraft designers in Germany. One of the few to make it further than the drawing board was the Sack AS-6, an experimental light plane with a round-winged planform that first flew in 1944. The aircraft proved unsuccessful, and was scrapped in early 1945.

=== Vought Flying Flapjack ===
During WWII, Charles H. Zimmerman led a team at Chance-Vought that created a series of designs that eventually resulted in the Vought Flying Flapjack, one of the first aircraft explicitly designed as a disc for aerodynamic reasons. The Flapjack had a large wing and very low wing loading, allowing it to take off easily from aircraft carriers. As with the earlier Vought V-173, the Flapjack's counter-rotating propellers were located at the ends of the wings to help counteract the drag-inducing vortices that would normally result from a wing of such a low aspect ratio. By the time the design was flying in the post-war era, jet engines had rendered the design obsolete and the US Navy lost interest.

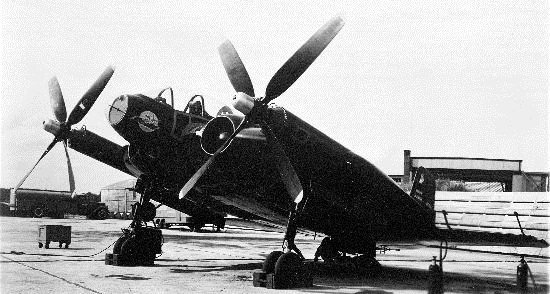
The Vought XF5U

In 1943, Boeing Aircraft built 3 scale model aircraft whose designs had saucer-shaped wings with a propeller in the front, and a rudder in the back. The cockpit was to be in front of the wings. There was no actual fuselage in the center. The aircraft model numbers were 390, 391, and 396. They were to be powered by a Pratt & Whitney R-4360-3 Wasp Major radial engine and capable of reaching speeds of 414 mph. They were intended to be fighter planes, armed with 4 20mm cannons and underwing hardpoints that could carry 1,134 kg (2,500 lb) bombs or external fuel tanks. Boeing submitted the proposals to the US Navy. The wing design had excellent short takeoff and landing (STOL) characteristics, that is preferred for fixed-wing aircraft carrier planes. The Navy rejected the Boeing designs in favor of the similar-shaped Chance-Vought V-173/XF5U-1 aircraft.

== Circular flying wings (flying saucers) ==
=== Avrocar ===
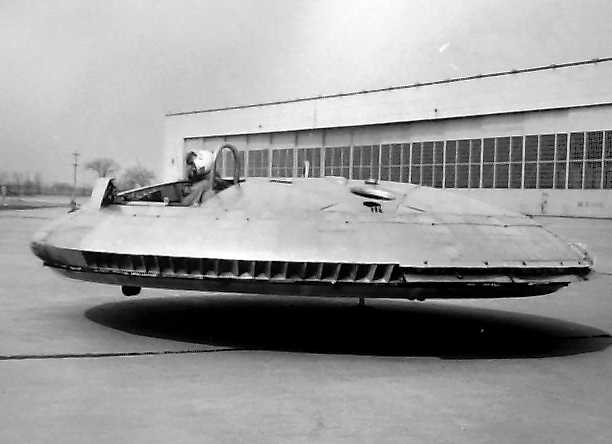
The Avrocar under test

After the war, the Avro Canada company developed a saucer-shaped aircraft. John Frost became interested in the Coandă effect to produce lift, eventually designing a disc-shape in which the thrust was directed downward around the entire disc by a flap ringing the aircraft, allowing it to take off and land vertically. Once in flight, the flap would be angled slightly, producing a small thrust while being directed to the rear. Little lift would be generated by conventional means; the engine thus would instead be used to build an "artificial wing" by directing the airflow around the craft. He offered a number of increasingly dramatic performance estimates, generally claiming Mach 4 performance at 24,000 m (79,000 ft), at which point the USAF took over funding under Weapon System 606A. The result was a 29-foot (8.9 m) diameter supersonic Project Y2.

Testing soon revealed that the entire concept was unworkable; the craft would be highly unstable at supersonic speed. Avro nevertheless continued work on the project as a subsonic design known as Project Silver Bug. Silver Bug was of interest to the US Army, who was looking into solutions for battlefield transport and support, and they took over most of the project funding. The final outcome of Silver Bug was the Avrocar or VZ-9AV, effectively (and unintentionally) a prototype hovercraft rather than an aircraft, which was made public in 1961.

=== Lenticular missiles ===
From the late 1950s the USA studied lenticular-shaped unmanned vehicles. These included the Lenticular Defense Missile (LDM) Pye Wacket and the nuclear bomb delivery Lenticular Reentry Vehicle.

=== Moller M200G Volantor ===
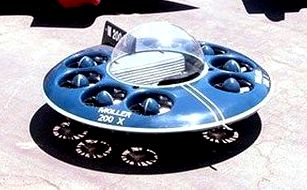
The Moller M200G Volantor

The M200G Volantor is a prototype flying saucer-style hovercraft, designed by aeronautics engineer Paul Moller. The M200G Volantor uses a system of eight computer-controlled ducted fans to hover up to 10 feet (3 m) above the ground. Volantor is a term coined by Moller meaning "a vertical takeoff and landing aircraft".

== Disc wing ==
A disc wing is a circular wing that spins. It is mostly used for flying disc toys.

== See also ==
- Aeroshell
- Ring wing
- Ufology
