= Sack AS-6 =

German experimental aircraft

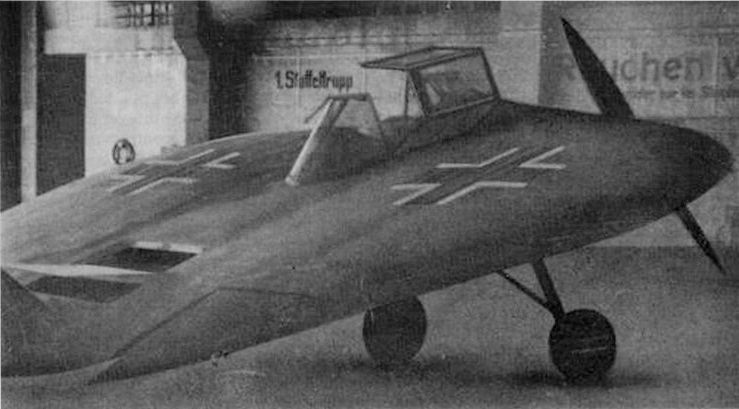

General information
- Type: Experimental
- National origin: Germany
- Manufacturer: Mitteldeutsche Motorwerke/Flugplatz-Werkstatt
- Designer: Arthur Sack
- Status: Abandoned
- Number built: 1

History
- Manufactured: 1944

The Sack AS-6 was a German prototype circular-winged aircraft built privately during the Second World War.

== Design and development ==
In July 1938, local farmer Arthur Sack entered his AS-1 circular-winged model in the first Reich-Wide Contest for Motorized Flying Models, which was held at Leipzig. The model had poor flight characteristics and had to be hand launched. However, Ernst Udet showed interest in Sack's design, and encouraged him to continue his research into circular wing aircraft for possible use as an observation or attack aircraft.

Sack went on to build four additional models based on the AS-1, with each increasing in size, before building the full-sized prototype as the AS-6 V1. The AS-6 V1 was built in January 1944 by Mitteldeutsche Motorwerke, with final assembly at the Flugplatz-Werkstatt workshop located at the air base in Brandis, Germany. The aircraft was built with the landing gear, cockpit, and pilot seat from a Messerschmitt Bf 109B, and was powered by an Argus As 10C-3 engine from a Messerschmitt Bf 108 Taifun. The wing structure was made of plywood.

== Operational history ==
Testing of the AS-6 V1 began in February 1944, with test pilot Rolf Baltabol in the cockpit. During taxi tests, it was found that the tail needed extensive modifications in order to handle the 240 hp of the As 10C-3 engine. Five flight attempts were conducted on the Brandis air base's 1,250 m (4,100 ft) runway, but the aircraft failed to achieve flight. Defects were found in the aircraft's control surfaces. On its fifth attempt, both brakes failed, resulting in structural damage to the aircraft.

The prototype was subsequently repaired and two more flight attempts were made, but once again it would not lift off. Sack blamed the problem of insufficient angle of attack, but Baltabol believed it to be lack of power, and suggested that the AS-6 be fitted with a 2,000 hp Daimler-Benz DB 605 engine from a Bf 109. Sack, convinced it was the angle of attack that was the problem, relocated the landing gear eight inches aft. This, too, was insufficient, and some sources claim that the landing gear was relocated a further 16 inches aft, but this is unlikely. The aircraft was reported to have been fitted with better brakes from a Junkers Ju 88 and have had further modifications to the tail. An additional 70 kg (154 lb) of metal ballast was added.

On April 16, 1944, the modified AS-6 V1 attempted another flight. The aircraft made a brief hop, but yet again it was unable to achieve flight. Another attempt was made with similar results, but during the short hop it was found that the torque from the As 10C-3 caused stability problems. One more attempt was made, but stability problems resulted in one of the landing gear legs collapsing. After this, Baltabol lost interest in the project, telling Sack that his AS-6 was dangerous and to stop flight testing until after wind tunnel testing and necessary modifications could be made. Sack subsequently went back to the drawing board and made further modifications to the aircraft.

In the summer of 1944, Jagdgeschwader 400 relocated to Brandis, flying the new Messerschmitt Me 163B Komet. Confident that the new Me 163 pilots were more experienced than the pilots previously available to him, Sack asked for a new test pilot for his modified AS-6. The aircraft, nicknamed Bussard (Buzzard) by the JG 400 pilots, made one final flight attempt, this time with Oberleutnant Franz Roszle at the controls. Once again, the aircraft made only a short hop, resulting in a collapsed landing gear leg. Roszle suggested that Sack send his design to Messerschmitt for proper development, but Sack refused. Nevertheless, Messerschmitt got word of Sack's aircraft and proposed to build an improved version, the AS-7, as the Me 600.

The AS-6 was damaged in a strafing run before Sack had a chance to make further improvements, and the aircraft was likely scrapped soon afterward. By the time US troops arrived at Brandis in April 1945, no traces of the AS-6 were left.

The Sack AS-6 is commonly associated with the Nazi UFOs conspiracy theory.

== Variants ==
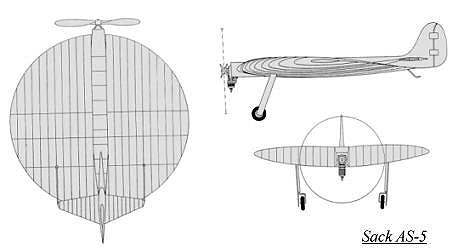
The AS-5 which Arthur Sack flew as a model

AS-1 through AS-5
Development models, each increasing in size.
AS-6 V1
Full-sized prototype, one built.
AS-7
Proposed enlarged version to be powered by a 2,000 hp DB 605 engine and armed with six MK 108 cannons mounted in the wings. None built.
Me 600
Proposed Messerschmitt production of the AS-7. Not built.

== Specifications (AS-6 V1) ==
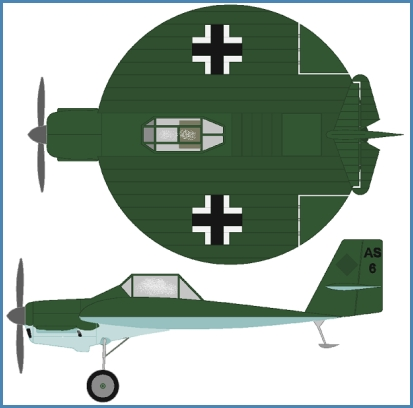
Sack AS-6

Data from

General characteristics

- Crew: 1
- Length: 6.4 m (21 ft 0 in)
- Wingspan: 5 m (16 ft 5 in)
- Height: 2.56 m (8 ft 5 in)
- Wing area: 19.62 m^{2} (211.2 sq ft)
- Max takeoff weight: 900 kg (1,984 lb)
- Powerplant: 1 × Argus As 10C-3 inverted V8 engine, 180 kW (240 hp)
- Propellers: 2-bladed, 2.5 m (8 ft 2 in) diameter

Performance

- Wing loading: 45.87 kg/m^{2} (9.39 lb/sq ft)

== See also ==
- Nazi UFOs

Aircraft of comparable role, configuration, and era

- Lee-Richards annular monoplane
- Arup S-2
- Arup S-4
- Nemeth Parasol
- Vought V-173
- Vought XF5U
