= LB1 (disambiguation) =

LB1 most commonly refers to the complete skull of Homo floresiensis found in the Liang Bua cave in Indonesia.

LB1 and LB-1 may also refer to:

- LB-1, a binary star system
- LB, a disability classification in lawn bowls
- LB1, a type of V6 automotive engine, see Chevrolet 90° V6 engine § LB1 and LB4
- LB1, the cDNA of the human CKAP2 protein-coding gene
- (39783) 1997 LB_{1}, a fast-rotating minor planet, see List of fast rotators (minor planets)
- Hatfield Little Bird #1, an ultralight aircraft
- Huff-Daland LB-1, an American biplane light bomber of the 1920s
- Staib LB-1, a homebuilt aircraft design
