= LRV =

LRV may refer to:

- Lenticular Reentry Vehicle
- Log removal value, a measure of the ability of a treatment processes to remove pathogenic microorganisms
- Lunar Roving Vehicle
- Light reflectance value
- Light rail vehicle
- Light reconnaissance vehicle, another name for a reconnaissance vehicle

== See also ==
- Boeing LRV
