= Boone Guyton =

American naval aviator and test pilot

Boone Tarleton Guyton
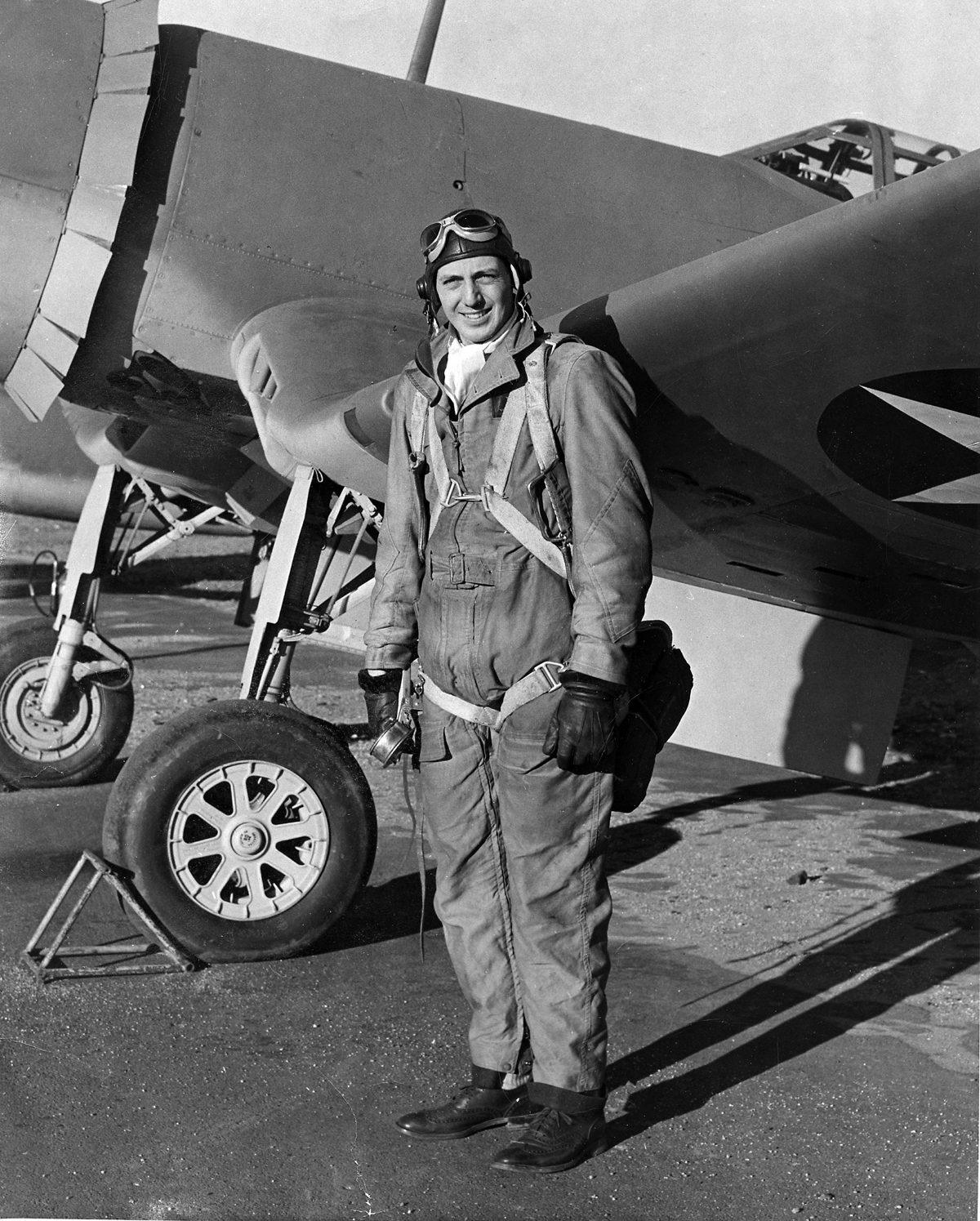
- Boone T. Guyton in 1943
- Born: September 4, 1913; East St. Louis, Illinois, US
- Died: April 4, 1996 (aged 82); Woodbridge, Connecticut, US
- Military career
- Allegiance: United States
- Branch: United States Navy
- Service years: 1935-1939
- Rank: LTJG

Boone Tarleton Guyton United States Navy, (September 4, 1913 – April 4, 1996) was a naval aviator, experimental test pilot, author and businessman. In a flying career spanning the biplane era through the jet age, Guyton was perhaps best known for his test pilot years at Vought-Sikorsky (Chance Vought) and his participation in the development of the F4U Corsair and various other military aircraft including the OS2U Kingfisher and the radical Vought V-173 flying pancake.

== Early life ==
Guyton was born in East St. Louis, Illinois, September 4, 1913. His birth certificate incorrectly spelled his first name “Bond” but was later corrected. His father William Henry Guyton, the Superintendent Transportation, E. St. Louis & Suburban Railroad, died in 1921 before Boone's 8th birthday. His mother, Martha (Windhorst) Guyton, raised Boone and his older brother William, much of it during the depression. Boone graduated from East St. Louis High School in 1931.

Guyton then attended Central Methodist College in Fayette, Missouri, graduating in 1935 and starring on the 1934 football team which won the Missouri College Athletic Union (MCAU) championship. Guyton played end and led the league in scoring, setting a college record for most touchdowns caught in the end-zone (seven). He was named on the all-conference team and earned a mention in Ripley's Believe It or Not for having scored all his touchdowns without carrying the ball across the goal line.

== Introduction to aviation ==
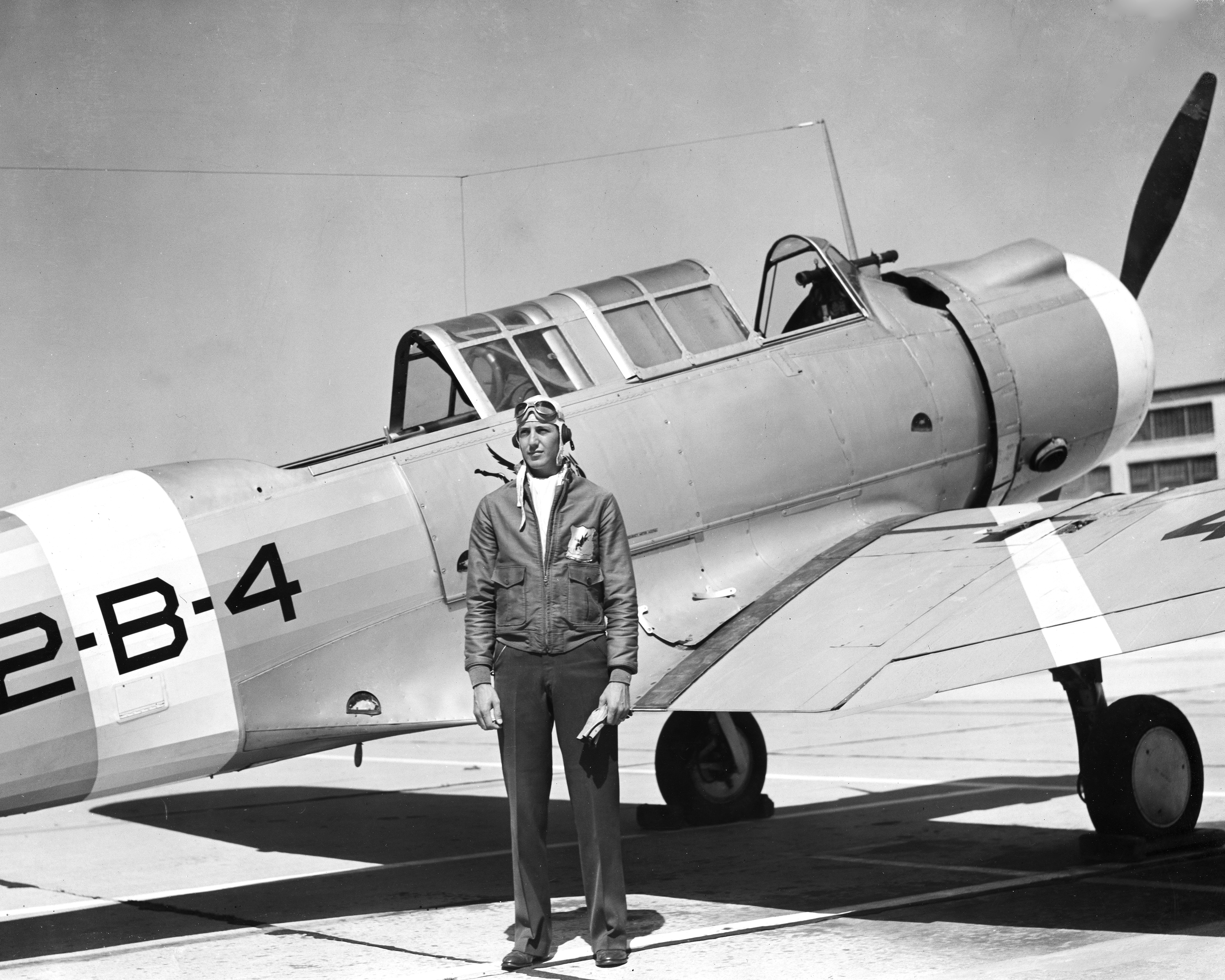
Guyton, 1937

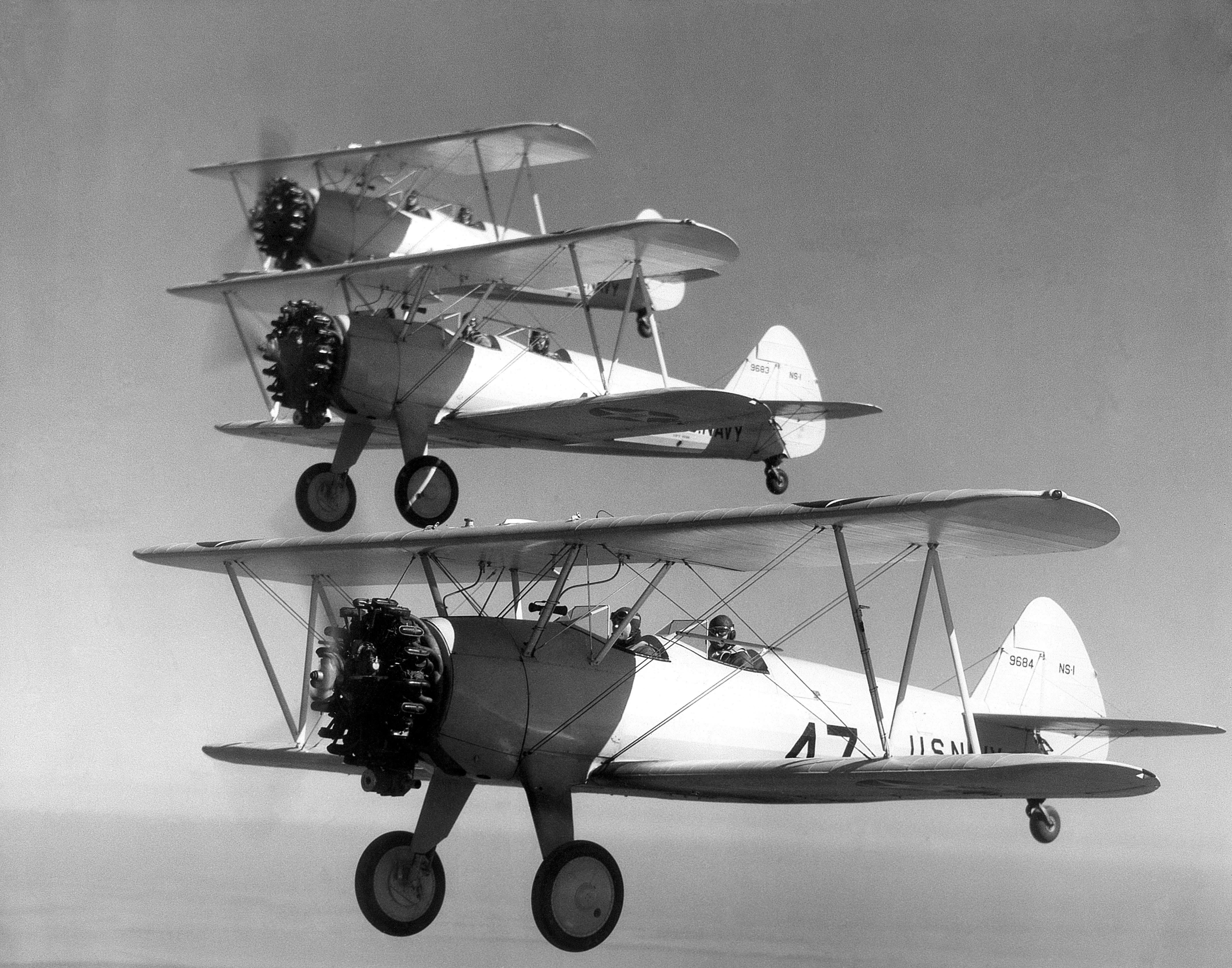
Boeing Stearman NS-1, NAS Pensacola 1936

In 1927 at the age of 14, Guyton became fascinated by aviation as he monitored the feats of Charles Lindbergh in the Spirit of St. Louis. Lindbergh was young Guyton's consummate hero, though Guyton would later feel that a flying career would be economically impossible to pursue.

Upon graduating from college in 1935, with the Great Depression in the United States, Guyton's options were few and far between. His college dean, feeling he would be a good teacher helped Guyton land a teaching position. Though grateful, Guyton felt uneasy and did not perceive himself a teacher.

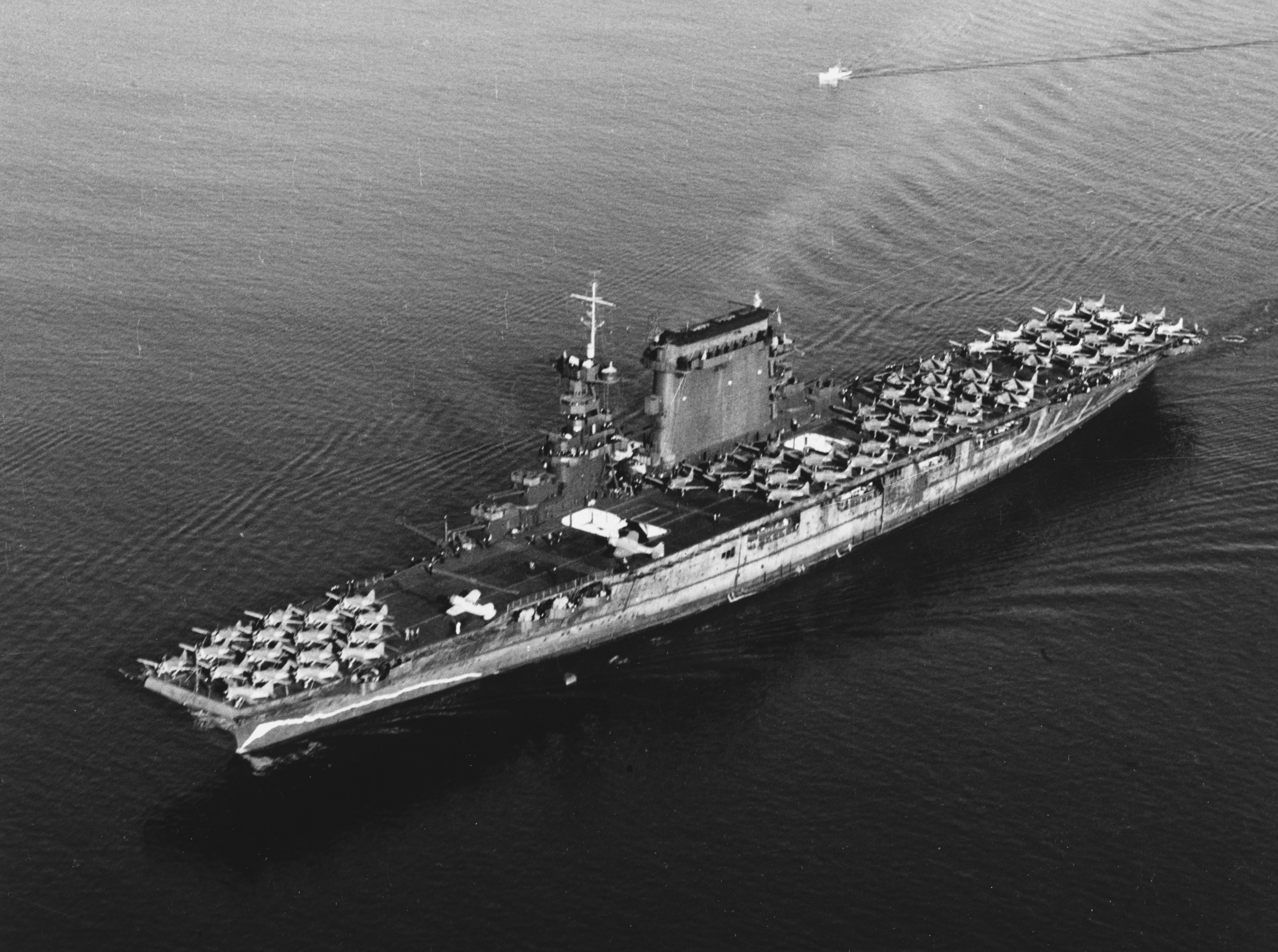
USS Lexington (CV-2)

Just after the teaching offer, a large brown envelope arrived from the U.S. Navy announcing a new aviation cadet program at Naval Air Station Pensacola, Florida. Guyton pursued the offer and was accepted. In 1936 he graduated tenth in the first graduating class despite a 44 percent attrition rate.

For the next three years, Guyton flew for the Navy out of Naval Air Station North Island San Diego, California and off carriers USS Lexington and USS Saratoga in various locations around the world, including Midway, Honolulu, the French Frigate Shoals, the Aleutians and Panama. Guyton was a member of Bombing Squadron Five flying mostly Boeing F4B-4s. In 1937, it was Guyton's squadron on the USS Lexington which took part in the search for Amelia Earhart. Guyton, however, was on leave at the time.

== Test pilot ==
Nearing the end of his three years as a Naval aviator, Guyton attended a TWA ground school for the DC-3 aircraft. With only a few weeks remaining at NAS North Island, Guyton reluctantly accepted a position to join TWA as a co-pilot. However, with just days remaining in the Navy, Guyton met a factory representative from Vought-Sikorsky and subsequently landed a test-pilot position for Vought teaching the French Navy to fly American dive-bombers. His last day as a Navy pilot was July 16, 1939. Guyton spent the next three days at Vought's Stratford, Connecticut, factory in a “study in frenzy”, preparing for France and learning as much as possible about the SB2U Vindicator (the French version of that plane had been dubbed the V-156) before departing for Paris.

Also during those three days, Guyton caught a glimpse of a mockup of Vought's next-generation, high-speed, single-seat fighter, the XF4U-1. The production version would later be known as the F4U Corsair. He departed for Paris on the French liner SS Champlain, arriving in Paris in August, 1939, less than a month before the Nazi Blitzkrieg against Poland and the beginning of World War II.

== In France, with war looming ==
Guyton spent six months in France, first living in Paris and flying out of Orly Airport. He was later moved to Brest, (flying out of the air station at Lanvéoc Poulmic) after the nighttime curfews, air-raid sirens and trips to the bomb shelters became all-too-frequent occurrences in Paris. The bulk of Guyton's time was spent testing the new V-156 aircraft as they arrived from the U.S. and training various French pilots. The planes were to be used, it was believed, to attack Nazi tanks when they arrived.

While stationed at Orly Field, Guyton nearly became only the second American pilot to fly the vaunted Messerschmitt Bf 109 fighter prior to World War II (the only known American to fly it at that time was Charles Lindbergh himself, who had flown it in 1938 and praised its abilities). The Messerschmitt pilot had landed in France with engine trouble earlier that year and the plane was brought to the French Aerodrome at Bricy, near Orly. Guyton had arranged a test flight following French racing pilot Michel Detroyat, winner of the Thompson Trophy just three years earlier in Los Angeles. Unfortunately, Detroyat experienced mechanical troubles with the Messerschmitt's brakes and plane was damaged upon landing to the extent that Guyton would miss his opportunity.

By the time January 1940 arrived with rising tensions in Europe, Nazis threatening France and the pressures of so-called neutrality laws, Vought terminated Guyton's assignment and sent him back to the States. He exited France via Italy, where he boarded the ocean liner SS Manhattan, which ran under the American flag and was theoretically safe from German U-boat attacks as it headed through the Strait of Gibraltar. Guyton arrived in New York harbor on January 24, 1940.

== Vought years ==
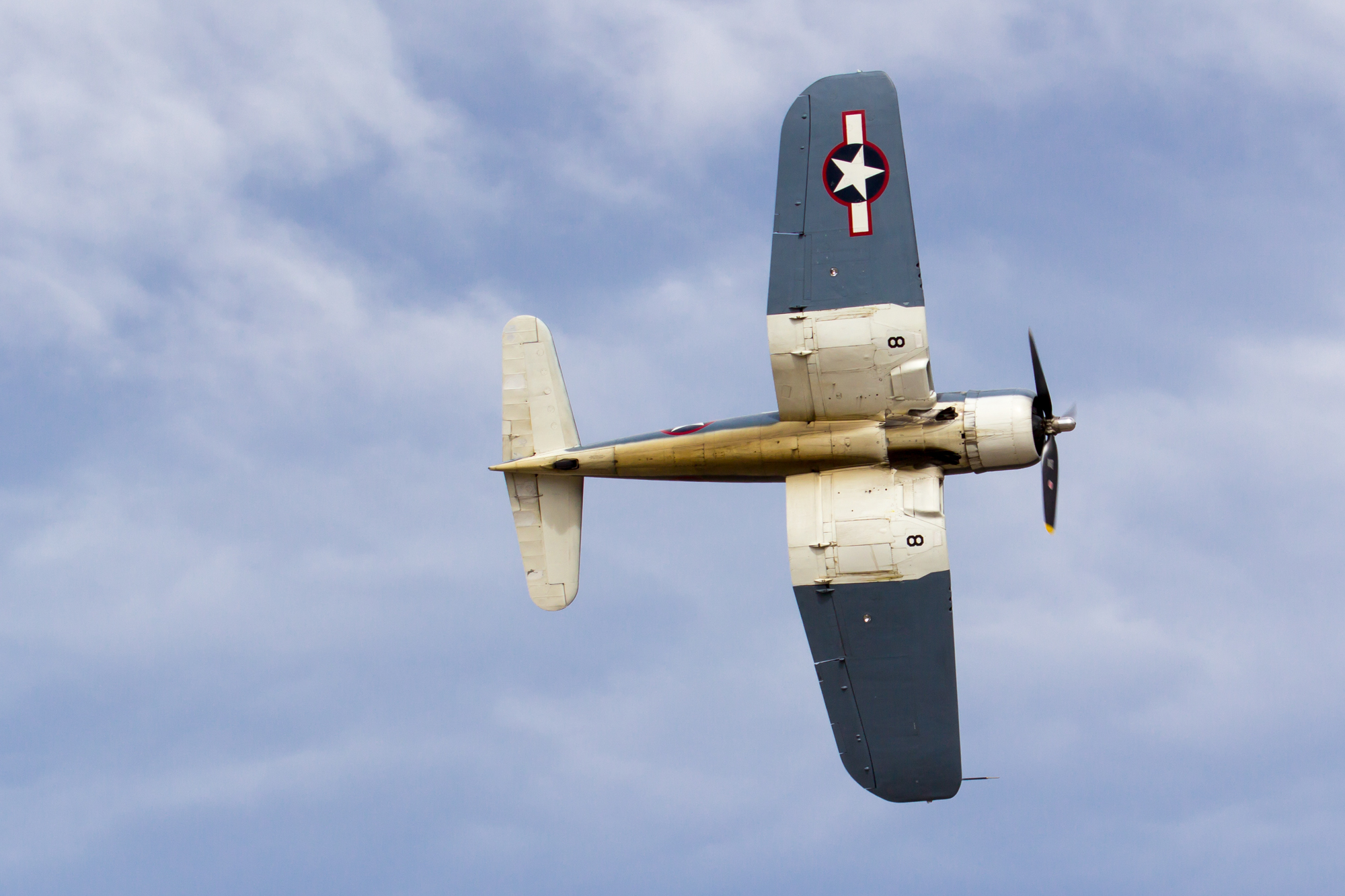
F4U-1

Upon returning to the States, Guyton found himself once again looking for work. Things at Vought were quiet as the new XF4U-1 Corsair prototype was not yet airworthy and the OS2U Kingfisher had yet to roll off the assembly line. With no other options, Guyton accepted an offer from TWA and finally flew for the airline he had passed up three years earlier. Guyton's airline career officially began on March 6, flying mostly DC-3s.

But as luck would have it, a job offer would arrive from Vought's Rex Beisel a mere three months later to fill an open position for an experimental test pilot. At the end of May 1940, Guyton left TWA and reported to Vought's chief of flight test, Lyman Bullard, shortly before the Corsair's maiden flight on May 29.

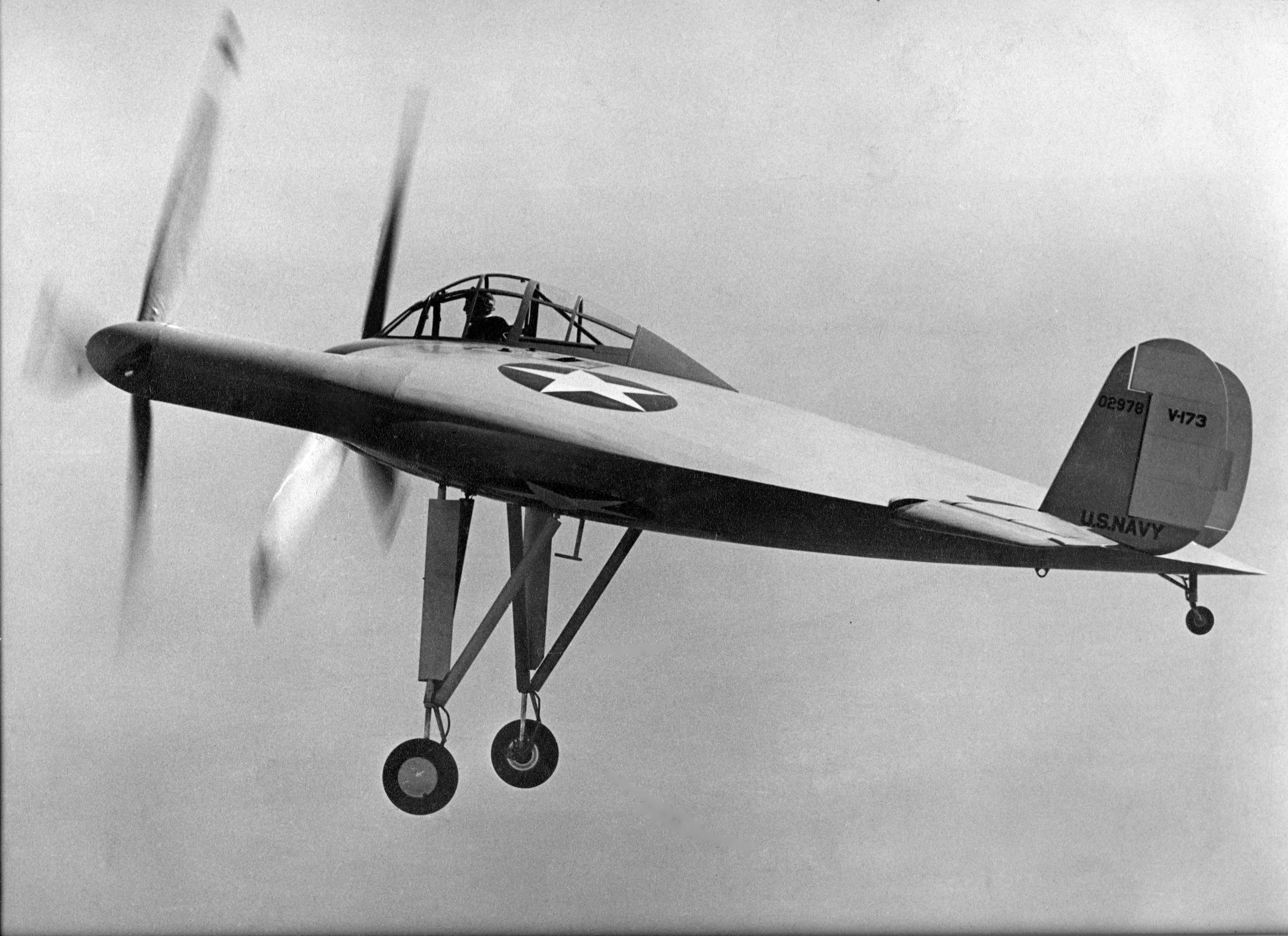
Guyton flying the V-173, November 23, 1942

On July 9, Guyton would fly XF4U-1 for the first time. During his fifth flight in the plane, on July 11, Guyton was caught in bad weather during high-speed testing and was forced to make an emergency landing on a golf course as fuel ran out. The Corsair skidded into a group of trees and flipped over, but the damage was luckily repairable and only set the program back two months. Subsequently, Bullard was able to demonstrate the XF4U-1 for the Navy on October 1 while also becoming the first single seat production fighter to surpass 400 mph (Bullard actually reached 405 mph).

Guyton continued testing the XF4U-1 Corsair as well as various versions of the SB2U Vindicator and OS2U Kingfisher. On 25 June 1942, he would fly the first production F4U-1 Corsair to roll of the assembly line and from that point on, the pace of the Corsair testing became frenetic and Guyton would spend much less time in the other aircraft. Back in the F4U-1 on June 26, Guyton then got married on the 27th, took one day off and returned to flight testing on the 29th. The next few years also included frequent trips to Navy bases around the country to train Navy pilots on the fighter that would soon carry them into combat. One such "student" was Captain Tom Blackburn of the VF-17; also known as the VFA-103 "Jolly Rogers".

Outside of his Corsair testing efforts, Guyton was also named the chief experimental test pilot for the Vought V-173 “flying flapjack” (or flying pancake) prototype. He took the V-173 on its maiden flight on November 23, 1942. Destined to become the next great propeller driven fighter design, development of the XF5U (the high speed fighter version of the V-173) would be stopped in 1947 before it ever flew. The Navy had switched focus to jet-propelled aircraft.

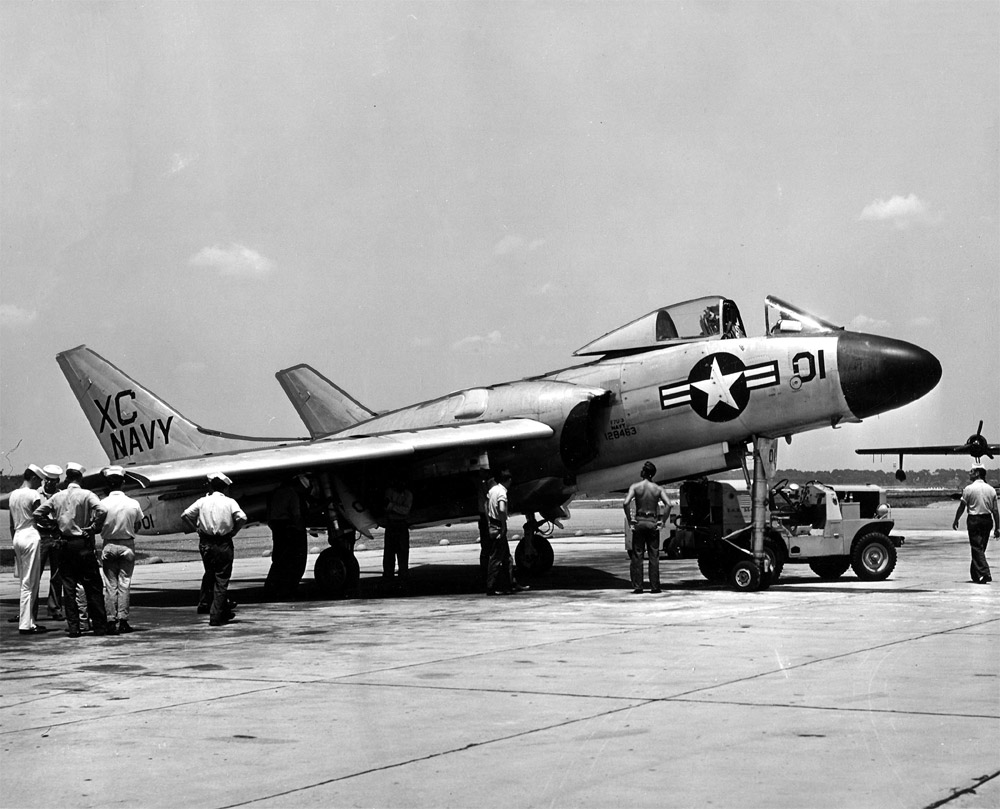
F7U Cutlass

In late October 1944, Guyton participated in Navy Fighter Meet at NAS Patuxent River, Maryland where pilots from the military and various manufacturers tested and compared military aircraft. It was there that he finally got a chance to fly a captured Japanese A6M Zero fighter and the revolutionary, jet propelled Bell YP–59A Airacomet.

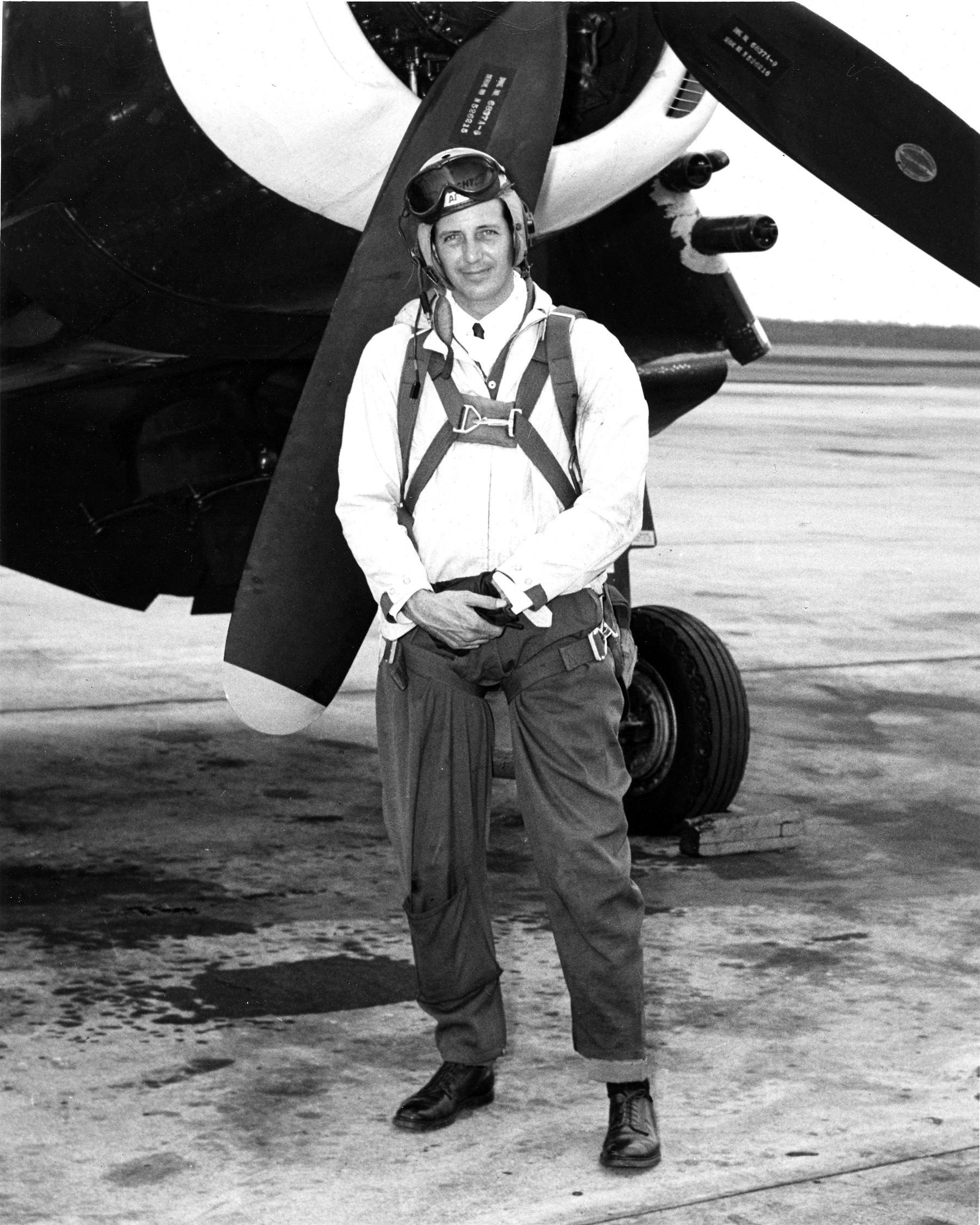
NAS Jacksonville, FL 1948 with F4U-5

By 1945, Guyton had logged more than 650 hours testing Corsairs (XF4U-1, F4U-1, XF4U-3, XF4U-4, F4U-4 etc.) and nearly 33 hours in the V-173

In 1948 Vought moved the factory from Stratford, Connecticut to Dallas, Texas. Guyton continued to fly later iterations of the Corsair (F4U-7 and AU-1) as well as Vought jets: the F6U Pirate and the F7U Cutlass. He decided to leave Vought in 1951 after 12 years, completing his career as an experimental test pilot. His last flight for Vought occurred on April 17, 1951, when he volunteered to deliver a F6U Pirate from Texas to Sorocco, New Mexico where it would join other discarded, obsolete aircraft. During the flight, a hydraulic failure forced Guyton to make an emergency landing, which he managed to walk away from unscathed.

== Lindbergh connection ==
In early 1943, Charles Lindbergh began consulting to Vought, related primarily to the engineering of the F4U. Both Lyman Bullard and Guyton briefed the legendary pilot on the characteristics of the F4U-1 before Lindbergh's first Corsair flight on January 6, 1943. Lindbergh flew the plane three more times on January 6 and then left Vought, not returning for a month.

At dinner one night, Lindbergh and Guyton shared some thoughts. Some were on aeronautical subjects and some not, including their mutual acquaintance, French pilot Michel Detroyat. Lindbergh mentioned that it was Detroyat who rescued him from the masses of exuberant fans the night he landed the Spirit of St. Louis at Le Bourget.

In March 1943, Guyton suffered a near-fatal crash landing after the engine in his F4U seized at 22,000 feet and he attempted to glide it back to the factory's airport where it literally broke in half upon impact. One of his first visitors at Bridgeport hospital, besides Guyton's wife, was Lindbergh himself.

Guyton's relationship with Lindbergh continued throughout the war including a dinner at the newly acquired Lindbergh Westport, Connecticut, home in late 1944

== Post-Vought years ==
Leaving Vought, Guyton returned to New England with his wife and four children, settling in Woodbridge, Connecticut, where they conceived a fifth child. Career-wise, Guyton assumed various management positions at Hamilton Standard, United Technologies Corporation - Missiles and Space Division, and eventually his own company. Guyton continued to fly recreationally until 1982 when he stopped for good, forty-seven years after joining the Naval Aviation Cadet program. He flew over 100 different aircraft, including almost all of the top fighters of World War II (P-51 Mustang, Supermarine Spitfire, P-47 Thunderbolt, P-38 Lightning, F4F Wildcat, Japanese Zero, F6F Hellcat, Curtiss P-40), but he is best remembered as the chief experimental test pilot for the Corsair.

During his retirement years, Guyton lectured on the Corsair and V-173 and continued to write. His third and last book, Whistling Death – the Test Pilot's Story of the F4U Corsair, was published in 1990.

=== Death ===
Guyton died from cancer 4 April 1996 at the age of 82. He is buried in Woodbridge, Connecticut, where he spent the last 40 years of his life.
