= Arup S-1 =

S-1

General information
- National origin: United States of America
- Manufacturer: Arup Manufacturing Corporation
- Designer: Dr. Cloyd L. Snyder, Raoul Hoffman
- Number built: 1

History
- First flight: 1932
- Developed into: Arup S-2

The Arup S-1, also called the Snyder Glider and the Dirigiplane was the first in a series of "Heel Lift" vehicles developed by Dr. Cloyd Snyder.

== Development ==
Snyder was a podiatrist in South Bend, Indiana. He was inspired in 1926 by the gliding properties of heel-lifts to develop a full size aircraft. Experimentation was performed on balsa-wood aircraft, followed by wind testing on the hood of a car, at South Bend Central High School and finally at Michigan University. Students at the school, led by S. M. Pierce, tested and built a wood and fabric glider based on the designs.

== Design ==
The glider featured two wooden parallel trusses running along its spine, with two widely spaced truss wing spars. Wing ribs were attached to the spar with varnished shoelaces. The wing shape featured a straight leading edge with the trailing edge tapering back to the tail giving it a distinctive "Half Pie" appearance from the top. The vertical stabilizers were low, but ran the full length of the fuselage on either side with small canard like control surfaces at the leading edge. The aircraft had conventional landing gear. The pilot sat in a small "bucket" embedded in the center of the wing. A clear plastic leading edge helped ease the poor downward visibility. The internal volume of the wing was so large that Snyder planned on using Helium to assist in buoyancy, giving it the name "Dirigiplane" in several publications. The assisted lift concept was never applied to the glider though.

== Operational history ==
The first flight was an accidental launch by policeman Bert Olmstead. The glider was test flown 49 times by Glen Doolittle (cousin of the famous Jimmy Doolittle). The glider was towed aloft via auto-tow and was filmed by Pathé News. Raoul Hoffman was brought in to re-engineer the glider with the addition of a used Henderson Motorcycle engine and stronger Nicholas Beasley landing gear salvaged from an experimental design built by Milt Hatfield in exchange for flying lessons. The result was renamed Arup (short for Air and Up!). The underpowered aircraft was test flown and exhibited poor controllability, but flew without any major incidents.

== Specifications (S-1) ==
Data from Skyways, Sport Aviation

General characteristics

- Crew: 1
- Length: 14 ft (4.3 m)
- Wingspan: 20 ft (6.1 m)
- Airfoil: Modified Clark-Y
- Powerplant: 1 × Heath-Henderson B-4 , 26 hp (19 kW)
- Propellers: 2-bladed Custom made Walnut - South Bend High students

Performance

== See also ==
Related development

- Arup S-2
- Arup S-3
- Arup S-4
