= Vought V-173 =

American experimental aircraft (1942–47)

V-173
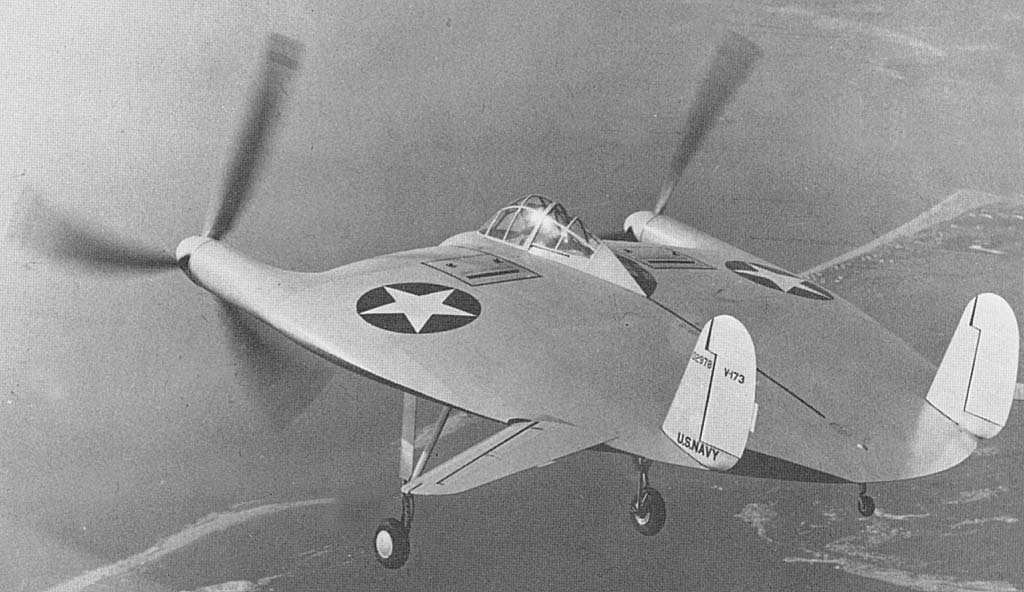

General information
- Type: Experimental aircraft
- Manufacturer: Vought
- Number built: 1

History
- First flight: 23 November 1942
- Retired: 15 March 1947
- Developed into: Vought XF5U

The Vought V-173 "Flying Pancake" is an American experimental test aircraft built as part of the Vought XF5U program during World War II.

Both the V-173 and the XF5U featured an unorthodox "all-wing" design consisting of a flat, somewhat disk-shaped body (like a pancake, hence the nickname) serving as the lifting surface. Two piston engines buried in the body drove propellers located on the leading edge, at the wingtips.

== Design and development ==
In the 1930s, noted aeronautical engineer Charles H. Zimmerman advocated the concept of "discoidal" aircraft, the so-called "Zimmer Skimmer" and worked on a variety of projects on his own and with the Vought company. After testing using scale models, including a remotely controlled, electrically powered large-scale model, designated the Vought V-162, the US Navy approached Zimmerman and offered to fund further development. Data and concept documentation were given to the Navy in 1939, with wind tunnel tests on full-scale models being completed in 1940-1941.

The original prototype, designated the V-173 (Flying Pancake), was built of wood and canvas and featured a conventional, fully symmetrical aerofoil section (NACA 0015). Designed as a "proof-of-concept" prototype, the initial configuration V-173 was built as a lightweight test model powered by two 80 hp (60 kW) Continental A-80 engines turning F4U Corsair propellers. Later the aircraft was fitted with a pair of specially modified 16 ft 6 in. three-bladed propellers. A tall, fixed main undercarriage combined with a small tailwheel gave the aircraft a 22° "nose-high" angle.

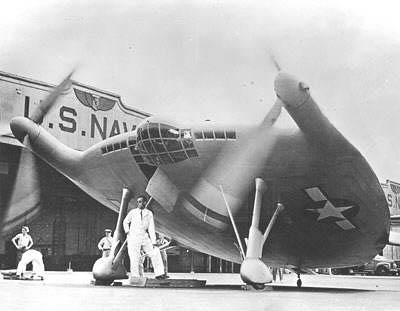
Ground testing of the V-173

The disc wing design featured a low aspect ratio that overcame the built-in disadvantages of induced drag created at the wingtips with the large propellers actively canceling the drag-causing tip vortices. The propellers were arranged to rotate in the opposite direction to the tip vortices, allowing the aircraft to fly with a much smaller wing area. The small wing provided high maneuverability with greater structural strength. The empennage consisted of two vertical fins with rudders, all-moving stabilizers with anti-servo tabs, and two large elevator/trim surfaces on either side of centerline on the trailing edge of the wing planform.

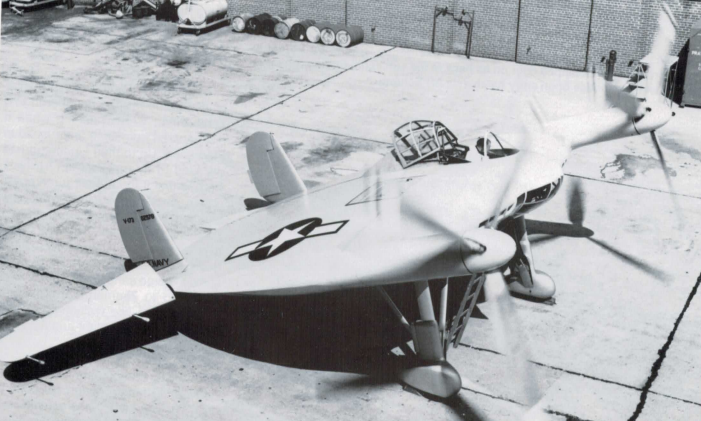
V-173 showing all-flying tail

Zimmerman chose to include the all-moving stabilizer design because he realized that the increased drag, prop wash, and large wing area would make the aircraft difficult to control at low speeds. Wind tunnel tests would prove that this was a success to an extent. The aircraft would prove to require a lot of force to control at low speeds during in-flight testing but the tail design would prove to make the aircraft controllable.

In January 1942, Bureau of Aeronautics requested a proposal for two prototype aircraft of an experimental version of the V-173, known as the VS-135. The development version, the Vought XF5U-1, so called "Flying Flapjack" was a larger aircraft with all-metal construction, and was almost five times heavier. Although a prototype was constructed, it only performed brief hops on the runway; it never entered true controlled flight.

== Operational history ==
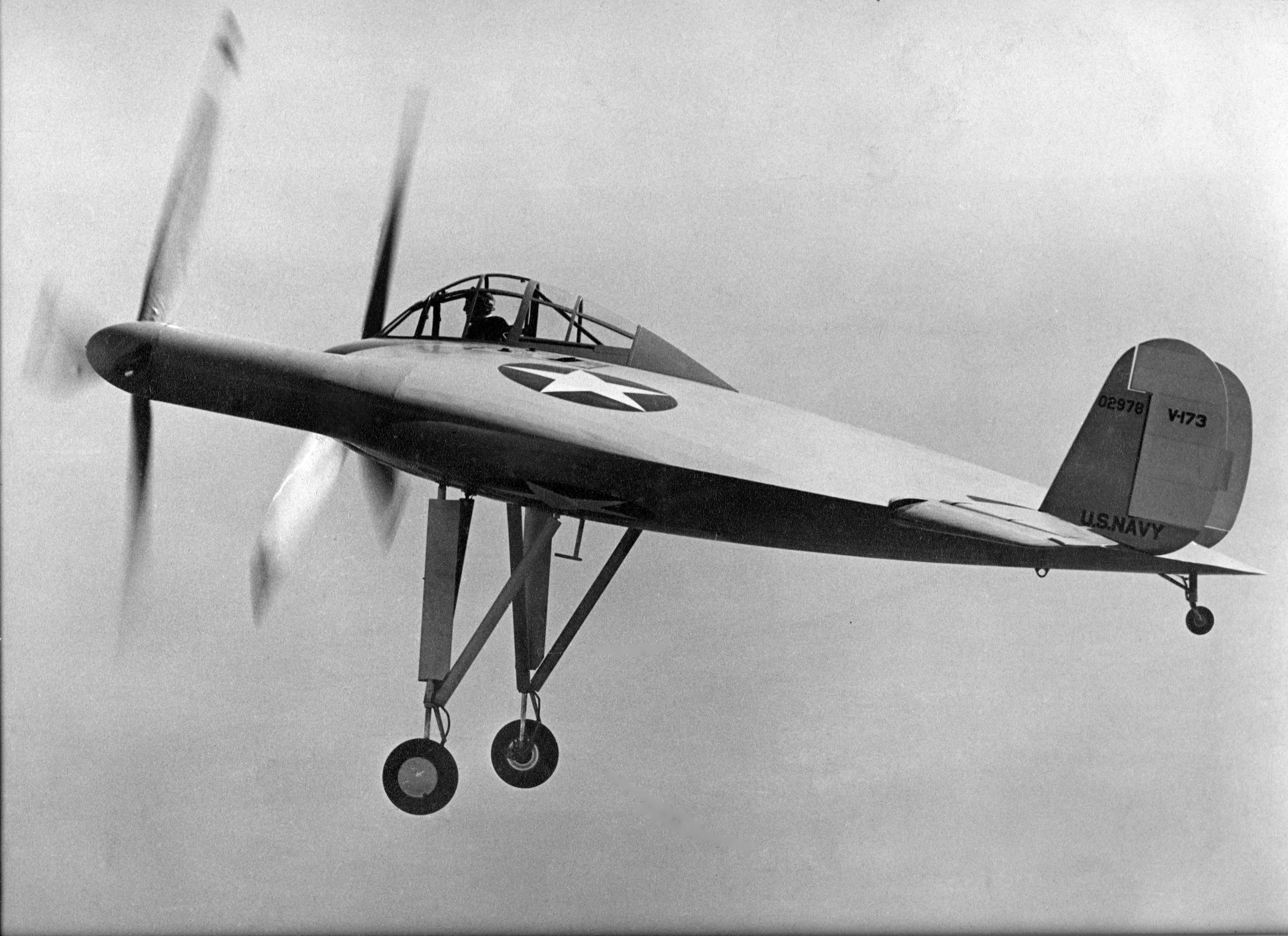
Maiden flight, 23 November 1942

The first flight of the V-173 was on 23 November 1942 with Vought Chief Test Pilot Boone Guyton at the controls. The aircraft's most significant problem concerned its complicated gearbox that routed power from the engines to its two long propeller shafts. The gearbox produced unacceptable amounts of vibration in ground testing, delaying the aircraft's first test flight for months. This contributed to the aircraft feeling much too heavy when maneuvering for its light weight. In addition to this on the first few flights, the pilot was never able to achieve enough speed to achieve the correct amount of airflow over the control surfaces to pull the aircraft into level flight. The test pilot Guyton discussed these problems with Zimmerman and they worked to eliminate them. In addition to this Guyton commented that the cockpit design was poor. He explained that in addition to the poor comfort the pilot had limited to no use for the clear bottom panels of the cockpit. He explained that the pilot sat too high in the cockpit to effectively use these lower panels for takeoff or landing. Flight testing of the V-173 went on through 1942 and 1943 with 190 flights, resulting in reports of UFOs from surprised Connecticut locals. Charles Lindbergh piloted the V-173 during this time and found it surprisingly easy to handle and exhibiting impressive low-speed capabilities. Both Lindbergh and Guyton found that they were almost unable to stall the aircraft. Guyton was able to keep the aircraft in flight no matter how hard he pulled the stick in low-speed flight ranges at any altitude under 20,000 ft. On one occasion, the V-173 was forced to make an emergency landing on a beach. As the pilot made his final approach, he noticed two bathers directly in his path. The pilot locked the aircraft's brakes on landing, causing the aircraft to flip over onto its back. Remarkably, the airframe proved so strong that neither the plane nor the pilot sustained any significant damage. Despite their inability to stall the aircraft they did find low speed handling to be a persistent issue largely due to the shape of the lifting body. They found that the aircraft acted as an airbrake when it was pulled into a high angle of attack. This meant that the control surfaces, the horizontal stabilizers, in particular, would become very hard to operate at low speeds such as stalls, takeoff, and landing.

The developmental V-173 made its last flight on 31 March 1947. In 131.8 hours of flying over 190 flights, Zimmerman's theory of a near-vertical takeoff- and landing-capable fighter had been proven. This project would be improved upon including the addition of potential armament with the Chance Vought XF5U. This project would improve on many of the weaknesses discovered during the testing of the V-173 prototype.

== Aircraft on display ==
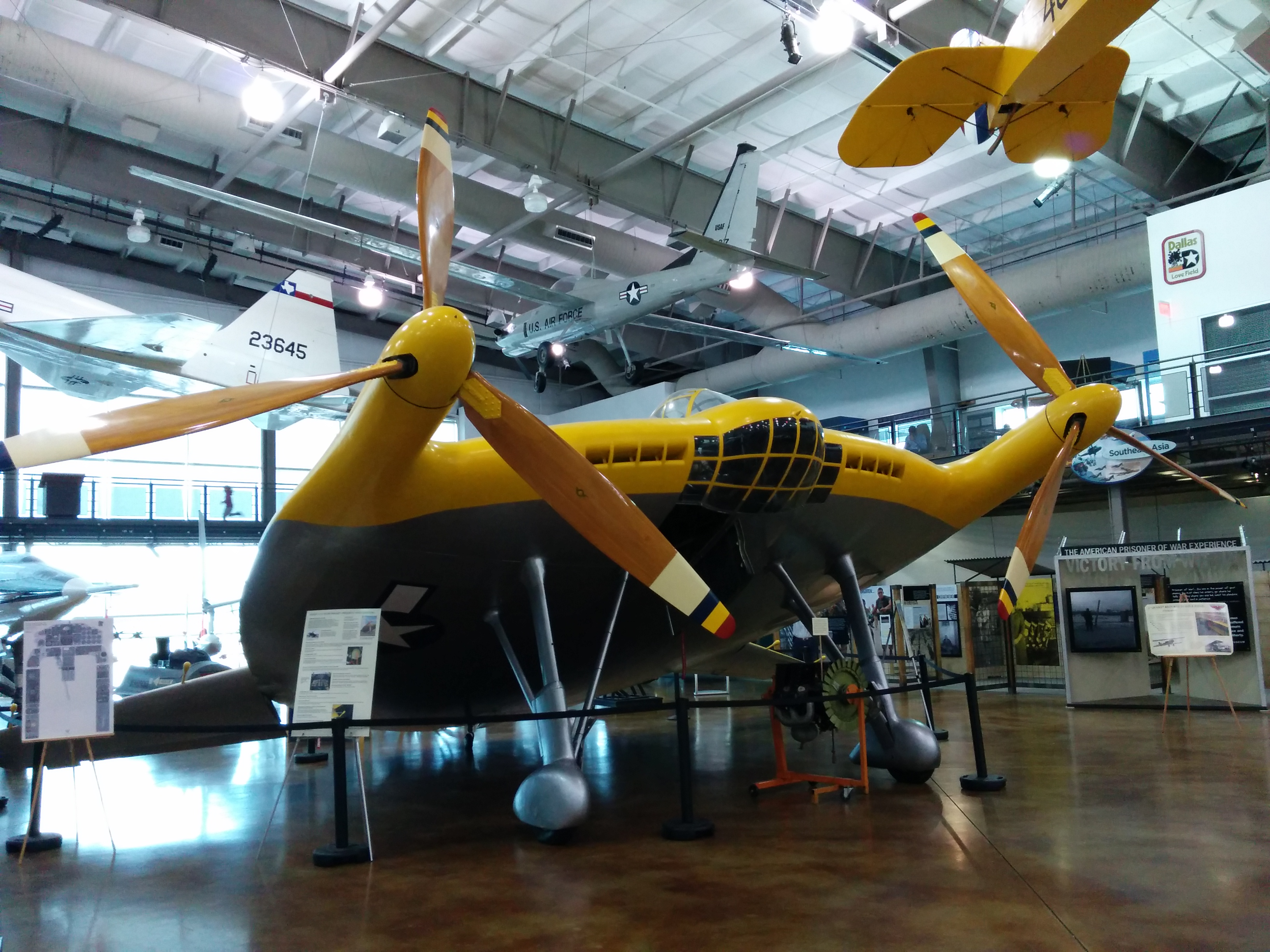
Restored Vought V-173 frontal view at the Frontiers of Flight Museum in Dallas, Texas

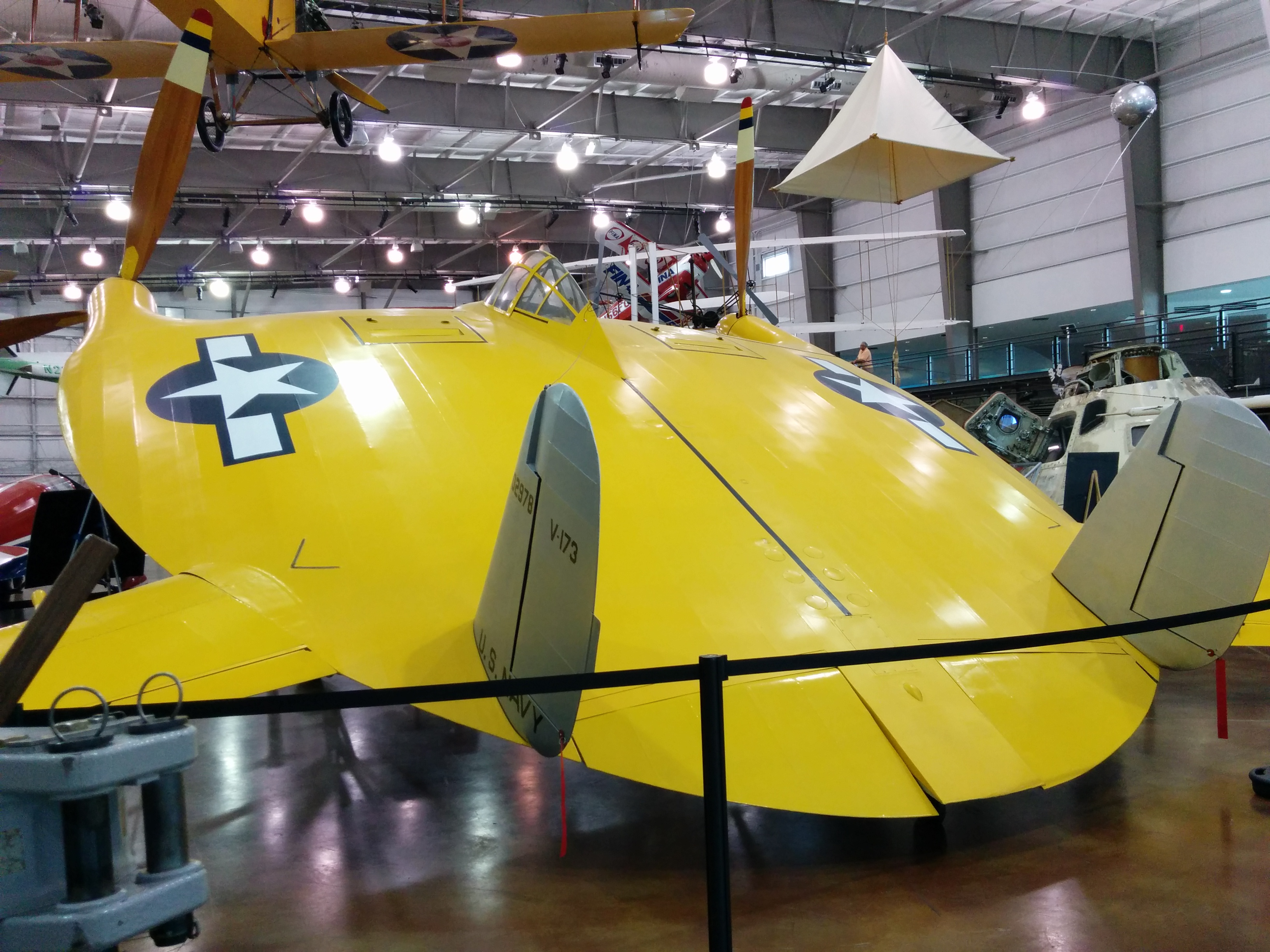
Restored Vought V-173 rear view at the Frontiers of Flight Museum

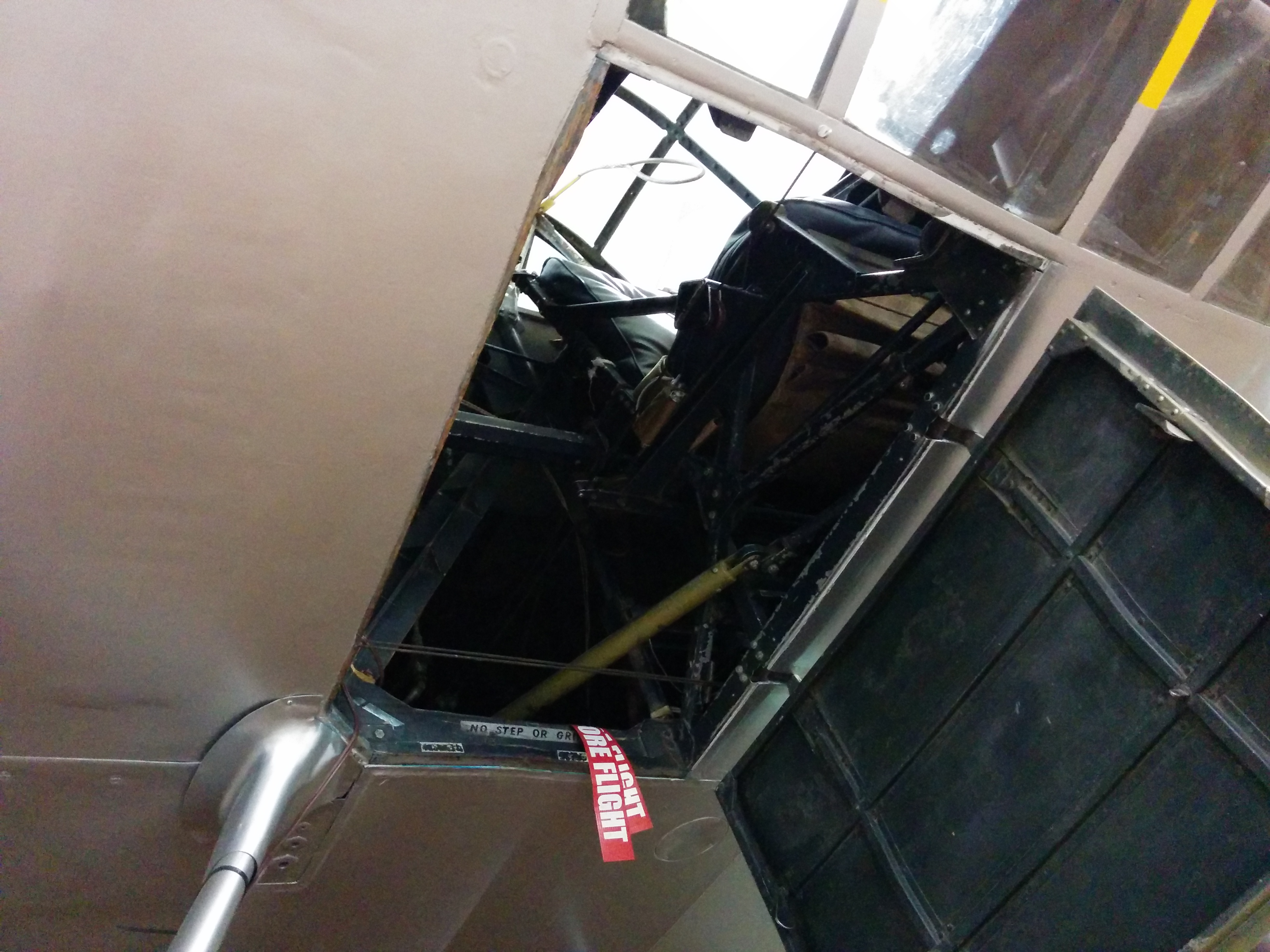
Vought V-173 cockpit

As of April 2012, after undergoing a long restoration by Vought Aircraft Heritage Foundation volunteers, the V-173 is on loan from the Smithsonian Institution to the Frontiers of Flight Museum in Dallas, Texas.

== Specifications (V-173) ==
General characteristics

- Crew: One, pilot
- Length: 26 ft 8 in (8.128 m)
- Wingspan: 23 ft 4 in (7.1 m)
- Height: 14 ft 9 in (4.51 m)
- Wing area: 427 sq ft (44.2 m^{2})
- Gross weight: 2,258 lb (1,024 kg)
- Powerplant: 2 × Continental A-80 horizontally opposed, four-cylinder engines, 80 hp (60 kW) each

Performance

- Maximum speed: 138 mph (222 km/h, 120 kn)
- Climb time to 5,000 ft (1,500 m): 7 min

== See also ==
- Circular wing

Related development

- Vought XF5U
- Arup S-2

Aircraft of comparable role, configuration, and era

- Sack AS-6

Related lists

- List of fighter aircraft
- List of military aircraft of the United States
