= Alliance A-1 Argo =

A-1 Argo
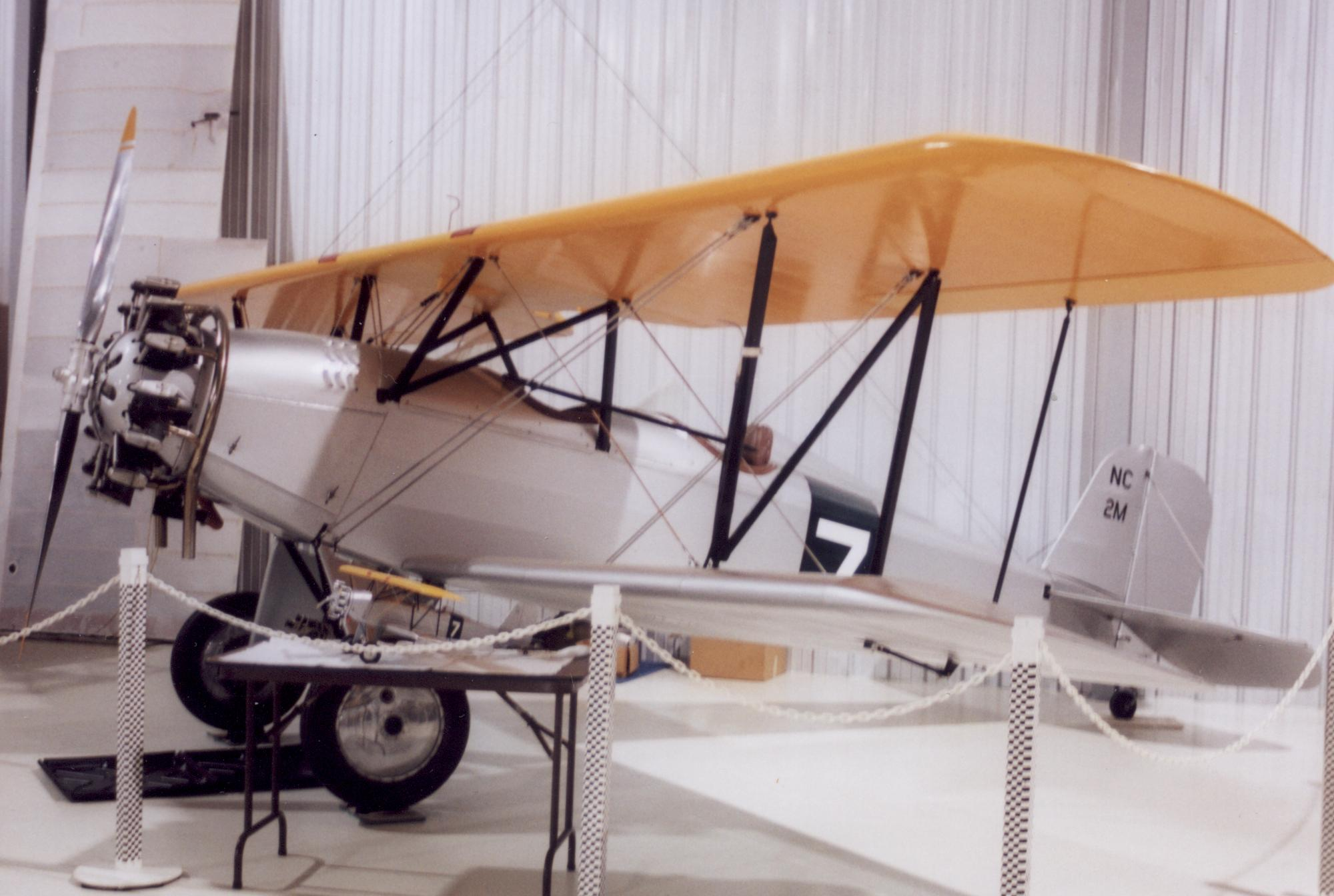
- The sole surviving airworthy A-1 Argo biplane, 1929-built, at the Golden Wings Air Museum at Anoka near Minneapolis, Minnesota.

General information
- Type: private owner biplane
- National origin: United States
- Manufacturer: Alliance Aircraft Corporation
- Status: two survivors, one airworthy
- Number built: 20

History
- First flight: 1929

The Alliance A-1 Argo was an American-built two-seat biplane of the late 1920s.

== Development ==
The Alliance Aircraft Corporation of Alliance, Ohio, was formed in 1928 by a reorganization of the Hess Aircraft Co. The firm designed the A-1 Argo as a sturdy two-seat open-cockpit biplane for operation by private pilot owners. The Warrior seven-cylinder engine was designed and produced in the same factory at Alliance.

== Operational history ==
Because of the difficult economic climate then existing, only 20 A-1 Argos were completed. Alliance Aircraft then went into bankruptcy in 1930, being reformed briefly as the Warrior Aeronautical Corporation before that organization also foundered later the same year.

Several Argo biplanes continued in operation by private owners until curtailment of civil flying in the USA in 1941. Two aircraft survived in mid-2009 of which, NC2M (N2M) was rebuilt to airworthy condition by Greg Herrick's Golden Wings Air Museum.

The Ohio History Connection displays a static A-1 Argo on the plaza level of the Ohio History Center. This particular aircraft was constructed in August 1929.

The Alliance Argo, N2M is the same plane as NC2M just the "C" was removed from the aircraft registration by the FAA for all aircraft after 1944. It is listed on the FAA Registry as serial number 108 built in 1929. This aircraft is now owned by Gregory Sean Messner in 100 Mile House, British Columbia, with the registration C-GSMA.

== Specifications ==
Data from Manufacturer's Specifications on American Commercial Airplanes as compiled by Aviation

General characteristics

- Crew: 1
- Capacity: 1 passenger
- Length: 20 ft 2 in (6.15 m)
- Wingspan: 28 ft 8 in (8.74 m)
- Height: 8 ft 0 in (2.44 m)
- Wing area: 203 sq ft (18.9 m^{2})
- Empty weight: 1,077 lb (489 kg)
- Gross weight: 1,615 lb (733 kg)
- Fuel capacity: 35 US gal (29 imp gal; 130 L)
- Powerplant: 1 × Hess Warrior seven-cylinder radial , 115 hp (86 kW)

Performance

- Maximum speed: 125 mph (201 km/h, 109 kn)
- Cruise speed: 100 mph (164 km/h, 87 kn)
- Stall speed: 40 mph (71 km/h, 35 kn) (landing speed)
- Range: 425 mi (684 km, 369 nmi)
- Service ceiling: 16,000 ft (4,900 m)
- Rate of climb: 1,050 ft/min (5.3 m/s)

== See also ==
- Nemeth Parasol
