= Arup S-2 =

Type of aircraft

S-2
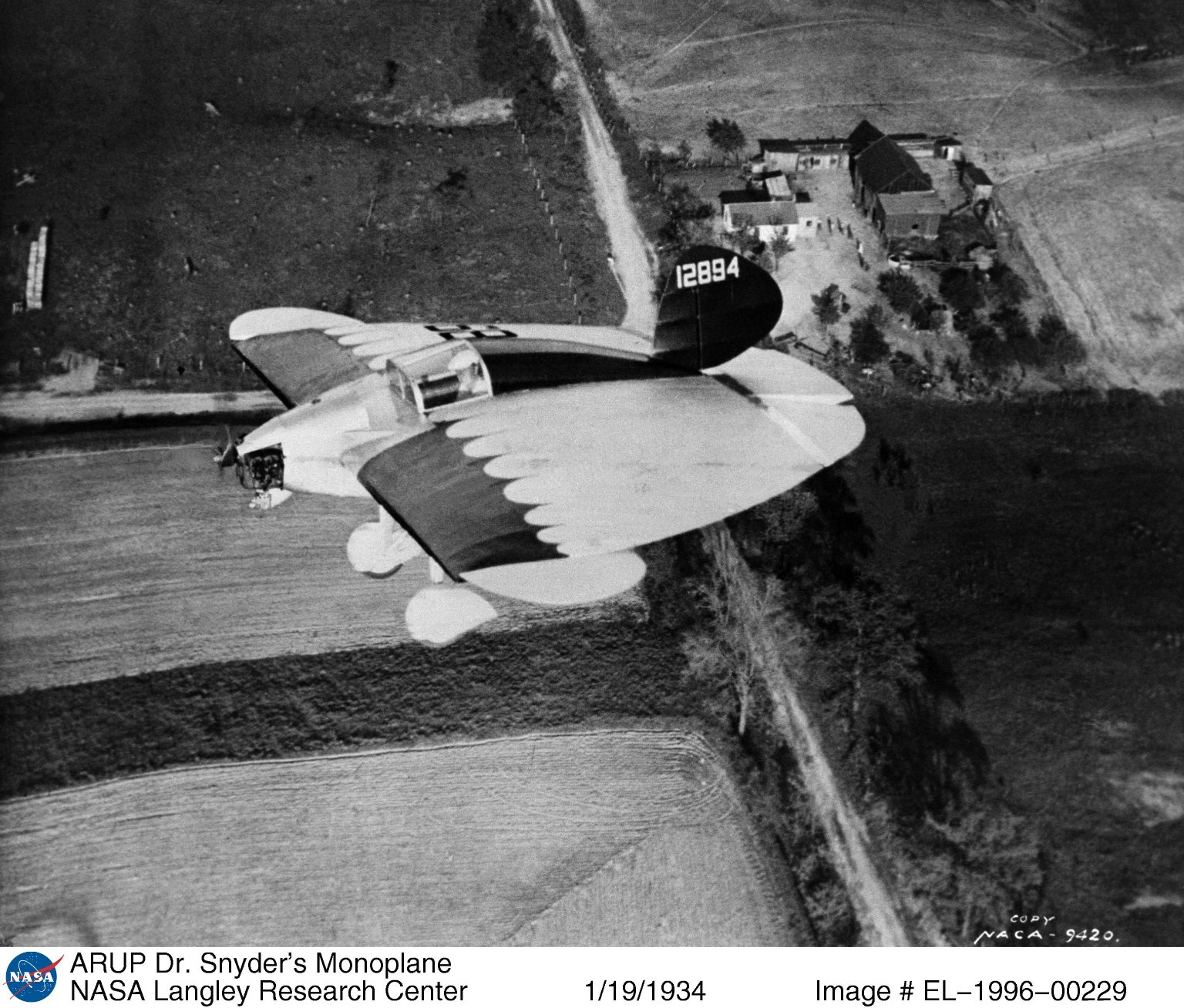
- S-2 in flight.

General information
- National origin: United States
- Manufacturer: Arup Manufacturing Corporation
- Designer: Raoul Hoffman
- Number built: 1

History
- First flight: April 1933
- Developed from: Arup S-1
- Developed into: Arup S-3

The Arup S-2 was the first commercial development of Cloyd Snyder's Arup S-1 low aspect ratio wing aircraft.

== Design ==
The Arup S-2 featured a straight leading edge wing with a trailing edge that tapered to the rear of the aircraft giving it a guitar pick shape when viewed from above. An M6 airfoil was chosen over its predecessor's sharp edged, modified Clark-Y airfoil. The large trailing edge control surfaces were mixed for pitch and roll control, but were assisted by small, movable, semi-circular wingtips that could provide additional roll control. Conventional landing gear was used, faired with wheel pants. The access to the cockpit was from a belly mounted hatch. Visibility was enhanced with celluloid panels on the aircraft's belly.

== Operational history ==
The prototype S-2 was test flown by Glen Doolittle. The STOL aircraft could fly at up to 35 degrees angle of attack without stalling. The aircraft was demonstrated across the country at events like the Indianapolis 500 and the 1933 National Air Races. Later it was demonstrated to the Army, NACA and CAA in Washington. D.C. Raoul Hoffman left Arup after the development of the S-2 to create his own design, the Hoffman Flying Wing. Engineer Charles H. Zimmerman viewed the S-2 trials in Washington and later applied the principles to the Vought XF5U program.

The S-2 was sold without an engine to a stuntman, F.F. Bowser Frakes, who performed air crashes at fairs. A Szekely radial engine removed from an American Eagle Eaglet was installed on the S-2, but did not perform well. A propeller was acquired from Milt Hatfield, who sourced the landing gear for the first S-1. Hatfield demonstrated how to fly the aircraft and it was eventually crashed in a show.

== Surviving aircraft ==
An example is in the possession of the Mid-Atlantic Air Museum in Reading, Pennsylvania.

== Reproductions ==
The Old Rhinebeck Aerodrome's veteran airshow pilot Kenwood Cassens has recently (11/01/2025) completed building a full-scale airworthy reproduction of the S-2, powered by a Continental A-40 boxer-four air-cooled engine.

== Specifications (Arup S-2) ==
Data from Sport Aviation

General characteristics

- Length: 17 ft (5.2 m)
- Wingspan: 19 ft (5.8 m)
- Wing area: 211 sq ft (19.6 m^{2})
- Airfoil: NACA M6
- Empty weight: 780 lb (354 kg)
- Powerplant: 1 × Continental A-40 , 36 hp (27 kW)

Performance

- Maximum speed: 84 kn (97 mph, 156 km/h)
- Stall speed: 20 kn (23 mph, 37 km/h)

== See also ==
- Lifting body

Related development

- Arup S-1
- Arup S-3
- Arup S-4

Aircraft of comparable role, configuration, and era

- Vought XF5U
- Chyeranovskii BICh-7
- Fauvel AV-10 http://www.nurflugel.com/Nurflugel/Fauvel/e_AV10.htm
- Boeing model 390/396 "flapjack" US Navy proposal http://ufxufo.org/flapjack/boeing390.htm
