= Nemeth Parasol =

Experimental aircraft

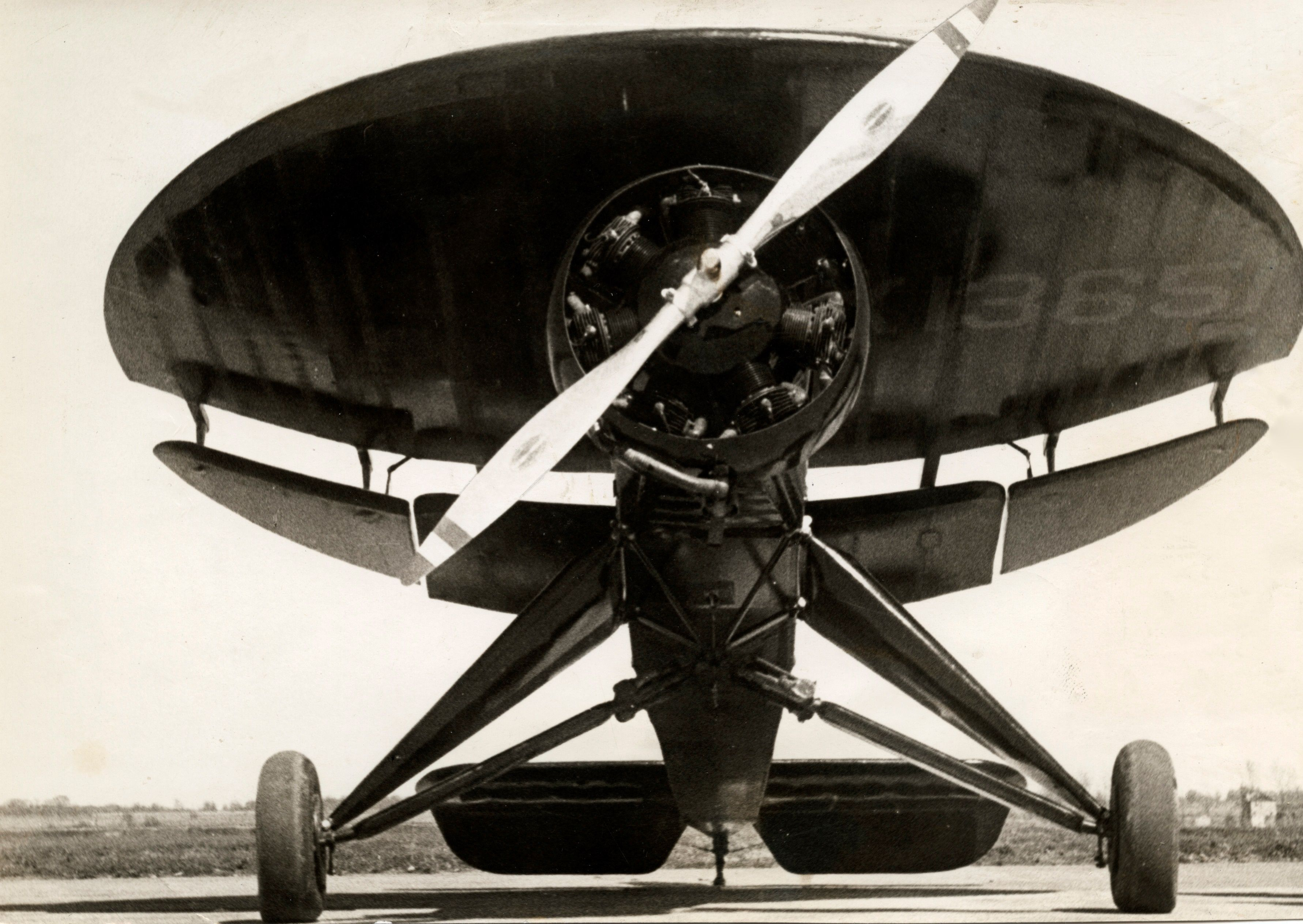

General information
- Type: Civil utility aircraft

Nemeth Parasol ( 'The parachute plane') was a prototype of a taildragger tractor configuration airplane with circular wing set in a parasol configuration. It was designed by Steven P. Nemeth from Dayton, Ohio, and made its first flight in 1934.

== History and description ==
The goal was to have a plane that could be stored in a large garage as opposed to a hangar and that it would be relatively easy to fly. Nemeth did wind tunnel tests at the University of Michigan in 1929. Nemeth worked with students from Miami University in 1934 to help him build the plane's wings. Nemeth used his custom "roundwing" on an Alliance A-1 Argo two-seat biplane fuselage. The high-wing monoplane had multiple struts to hold the custom "roundwing". The wing had a diameter of fifteen feet (4.6 m) including the flaps and ailerons. The plane reached a top speed of 135 mph (217 km/h). Thanks to the large wing, the plane could take off in just 63 feet (19 metres). Tests were done with stall speeds, turning off the engine in flight, and using the wings as a parachute. The parachute-stall landing gave the plane a short 25 feet of landing to stop. The original 90 hp Lambert engine in the Alliance A-1 was replaced with a Warner Scarab 120 hp engine. Nemeth did two years of testing but did not get any interest in producing more. The fate of the one plane built is unknown. Nemeth’s success gave others ideas and other experimental aircraft with circular wings were built later like the Sack AS-6, the Vought XF5U and the Avrocar. (Note: Nemeth is sometimes spelled Nuneth, 'Németh' is a frequent Hungarian surname, means 'German'.) Steven P. Nemeth was a flight instructor at the McCook Field near Dayton, Ohio, which closed in 1927. The successful test flights made it into some newspapers and magazines. Modern Mechanix and Popular Science both had articles on the special new plane.

== Specifications ==
(Note: Stall speed was called 0 mph, as the engine was turned off for the landing test.)
General characteristics

- Crew: 1
- Capacity: 1 passenger
- Length: 20 ft 2 in (6.15 m)
- Wingspan: 15 ft (4.6 m)
- Fuel capacity: 35 US gal (29 imp gal; 130 L)
- Powerplant: 1 × Warner Scarab , 120 hp (89 kW)

Performance

- Maximum speed: 135 mph (217 km/h, 117 kn)
- Cruise speed: 100 mph (164 km/h, 87 kn)
- Stall speed: 25 mph (40 km/h, 22 kn)
