= Arup Manufacturing Corporation =

- Company type: Aircraft Manufacturer
- Predecessor: Monowing Aircraft Corporation
- Key people: Dr. C.L. Snyder
- Products: Arup S-1, Arup S-2, Arup S-3, Arup S-4 aircraft.

Arup Manufacturing Corporation was an American aircraft manufacturer of tailless aircraft.

== History ==
Dr. C.L. Snyder experimented with tailless aircraft starting with a 1926 glider called the Dirigiplane. The aircraft used a Clark Y airfoil that could be filled with helium gas to assist with lift. Snyder formed the Monowing corporation to further develop the aircraft. The design progressed into the Arup S-1 design and the formation of Arup Manufacturing.

In 1934, Snyder's chief engineer, Raoul J. Hoffman left the company to create a similar design, the Hoffman Flying Wing. His breakaway project ended with the crash of the prototype from an onboard fire.

== Aircraft ==
Summary of aircraft
Model name	First flight	Number built	Type
Arup S-1	1926	1	Tailless aircraft
Arup S-2	1933	1	Tailless aircraft
Arup S-3	1934	1	Blended wing
Arup S-4	1935	1	Blended wing
