= Lenticular Reentry Vehicle =

Nuclear warhead delivery system

The Lenticular Reentry Vehicle (LRV), according to a November 2000 Popular Mechanics cover story, was an experimental nuclear warhead delivery system under development during the Cold War by defense contractor North American Aviation, managed out of Wright-Patterson Air Force Base in Dayton, Ohio.

== Development ==
The project was classified as secret in 1962 and cleared for public release on December 28, 1999. Its declassified technical report had been compiled by R. J. Oberto, Los Angeles Division of North American Aviation. His report described the LRV as an offensive weapons system. Popular Mechanics obtained information on the LRV from a Freedom of Information Act request after documents describing the project were declassified in 1999.

Related research commenced during the late 1950s. The Convair/Pomona division of General Dynamics initiated a project entitled Pye Wacket. Its purpose was to determine the feasibility of developing a missile-defense system based on flying discs (lenticular vehicles). Although Pye Wacket was terminated by 1961, research had shown lenticular-shaped vehicles possessed sound re-entry characteristics. Subsequently, research proceeded towards developing crewed lenticular re-entry vehicles during the 1960s and 1970s.

According to Oberto's report, the LRV was a 40-foot (12 m) half-saucer with a flat rear edge. The design-study documents indicated it could support a crew of four men for six-week orbital missions. Propulsion was from a rocket engine (either chemical or nuclear) and the craft would also have contained an onboard nuclear reactor for electrical power generation.

The existence of the LRV program may lend credence to the military flying saucers theory of unidentified flying objects. However, the flight characteristics of the LRV, as described by these documents, are more similar to a standard orbital space capsule of the 1960s era rather than the rapid motion and sudden velocity change characteristics of many reported UFOs.

As of the publication of the Popular Mechanics article, there was no official confirmation as to whether the Lenticular Reentry Vehicle ever flew.

Dynamic analysis of lenticular missile configurations was conducted by the General Dynamics Pomona Division under Army Missile Command contract in 1963.
