= Pye Wacket =

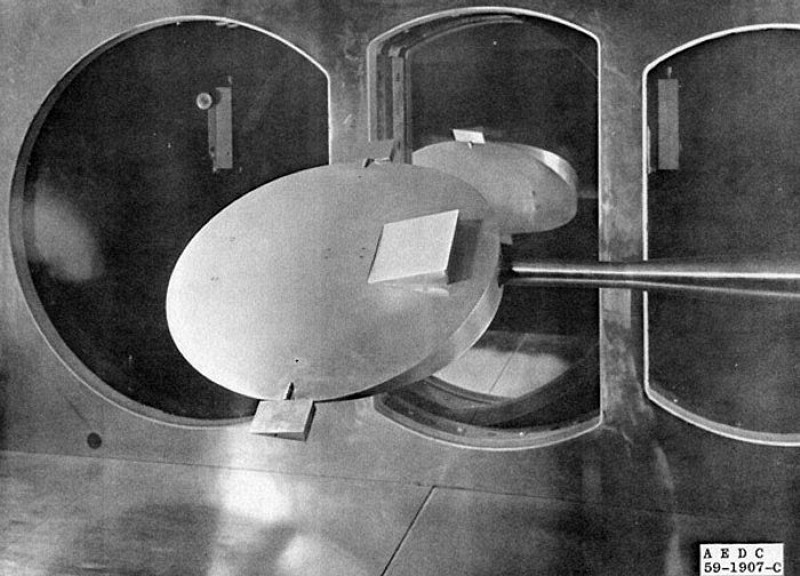
- Pye Wacket lenticular missile prototype with early exterior control surfaces
- Type: Air-to-air missile
- Place of origin: United States

Production history
- Designer: Convair (General Dynamics)
- Designed: 1957–1961
- No. built: Not produced

Specifications
- Mass: 510 lbs (230 kg)
- Height: 9 inches (23 cm)
- Diameter: 70 in (1.8 m)
- Wingspan: 70 in (1.8 m)
- Warhead: high explosive
- Warhead weight: 55 lb (25 kg)
- Engine: Thiokol M58A2 solid-fuel rocket motor x 3; 10,200 lbf (4,600 kgf) thrust each
- Propellant: solid rocket engine
- Operational range: 72 nm (133 km; 83 mi)
- Flight ceiling: 77,350 ft (23,580 m) to sea level
- Maximum speed: Mach 6.5+
- Guidance system: Midcourse: autopilot Terminal: infrared homing
- Steering system: nitrogen-injected binary thrusters
- Launch platform: XB-70 Valkyrie (planned)

Pye Wacket was the codename for an experimental lenticular-form air-to-air missile developed by the Convair Division of the General Dynamics Corporation in 1957. Intended as a defensive missile for the B-70 Valkyrie Mach 3 bomber, the program saw extensive wind-tunnel testing and seemed promising; however, the cancellation of the B-70 removed the requirement for the missile, and the project was cancelled.

== Genesis ==
Project "Pye Wacket", officially known as the Lenticular Defense Missile (LDM) Program and by the project number WS-740A, was instituted in 1958 in response to a US Air Force request for a Defensive Anti-Missile System (DAMS) to protect the proposed B-70 Valkyrie strategic bomber from high-speed, high-altitude surface-to-air missiles (SAMs) and interceptor aircraft.

The extreme speed and operating altitude of the Valkyrie was considered sufficient protection against Soviet interceptors of the time. However it was anticipated that future aircraft and missile developments would reduce the B-70's margin of superiority, especially following the SA-2 Guideline SAM being displayed during the 1957 May Day parade. Intelligence reports indicated that SAMs were being deployed in large numbers throughout Russia, and it was believed the SA-2 was capable of being fitted with a nuclear warhead. Therefore, it was decided that the B-70 would need an interceptor missile to defend itself against the perceived threat.

== Design ==
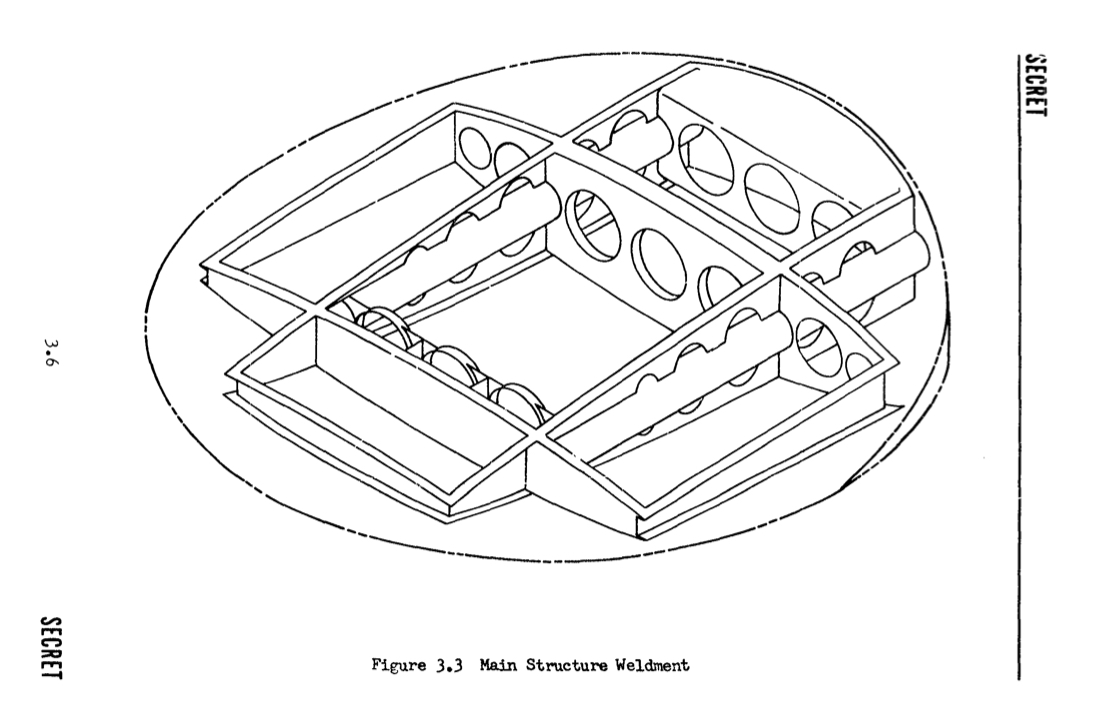
Main structure weldment of the Pye Wacket, as shown in the Feasibility Test Vehicle Study prepared by General Dynamics Corporation for U.S. Air Force Systems Command in 1961

The specifications for the proposed DAMS called for an air-launched defensive missile, capable of engaging incoming missiles at relative speeds of up to Mach 7, surviving a rate of acceleration between 60 g to 250 g, and being able to undertake rapid terminal-phase guidance changes in any direction.

Following initial studies and wind-tunnel testing at the Air Proving Ground Center and Arnold Engineering Development Center, a radically unconventional design emerged that featured a lenticular, wedge-shaped airframe. The lenticular design was considered to have the best handling characteristics at extremely high angles of attack, and would theoretically possess ideal mass distribution, giving the missile outstanding terminal agility. In addition, the lenticular design allowed for omnidirectional launching from the carrying aircraft.

Following the feasibility studies, a contract for the development of the DAMS design was awarded to the Convair division of the General Dynamics Corporation in Pomona, California in 1959. Wind tunnel testing of several options for control of the missile resulted in an arrangement of six small rocket thrusters being selected for reaction control. The airframe of the missile was constructed of magnesium alloy, and main power would be provided by three Thiokol M58A2 solid-fuel rockets.

== Cancellation ==
Pye Wacket was planned to be tested using a rocket sled launcher, with a Mach 5 booster rocket being used later in the test program. There are unconfirmed reports that some tests were conducted in 1960. However the high cost and perceived vulnerability of the B-70 against the projected performance of Soviet air defenses, combined with the 1960 U-2 incident in which a high-flying spyplane had been shot down, led to the decision that intercontinental ballistic missiles would, in the future, be the primary nuclear delivery force of the United States, and therefore the B-70 project was cancelled in early 1961. Pye Wacket, its delivery vehicle no longer available, is believed to have been cancelled soon after, although the ultimate fate of the program remains classified.

== See also ==
- Flying saucer
- Lenticular Reentry Vehicle
