= Lee-Richards annular monoplane =

Experimental aircraft

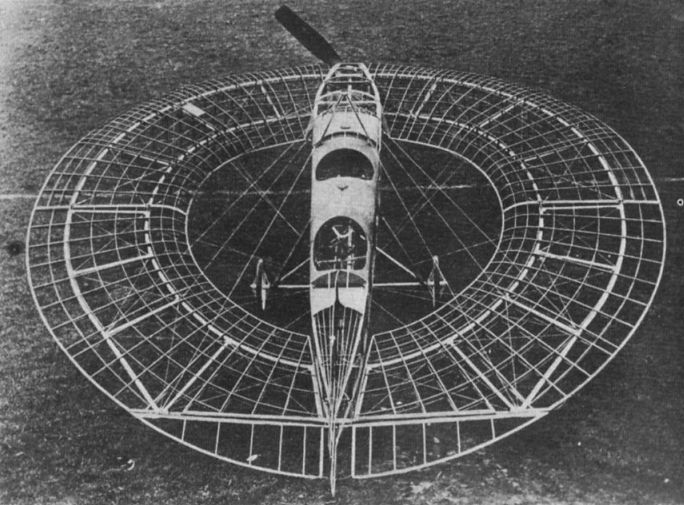
- The first monoplane during construction

General information
- Type: Experimental prototype
- Manufacturer: James Radley
- Designer: Cedric Lee and G. Tilghman Richards
- Number built: 3

History
- First flight: 1913

During the pioneer years before the First World War, Cedric Lee and G. Tilghman Richards in the UK built and flew a series of aircraft having a novel flat ring-shaped or annular wing. They built both biplane and monoplane types, and in 1913 their first monoplane proved to be an early example of a statically stable aircraft.

== History ==
=== Annular biplane ===
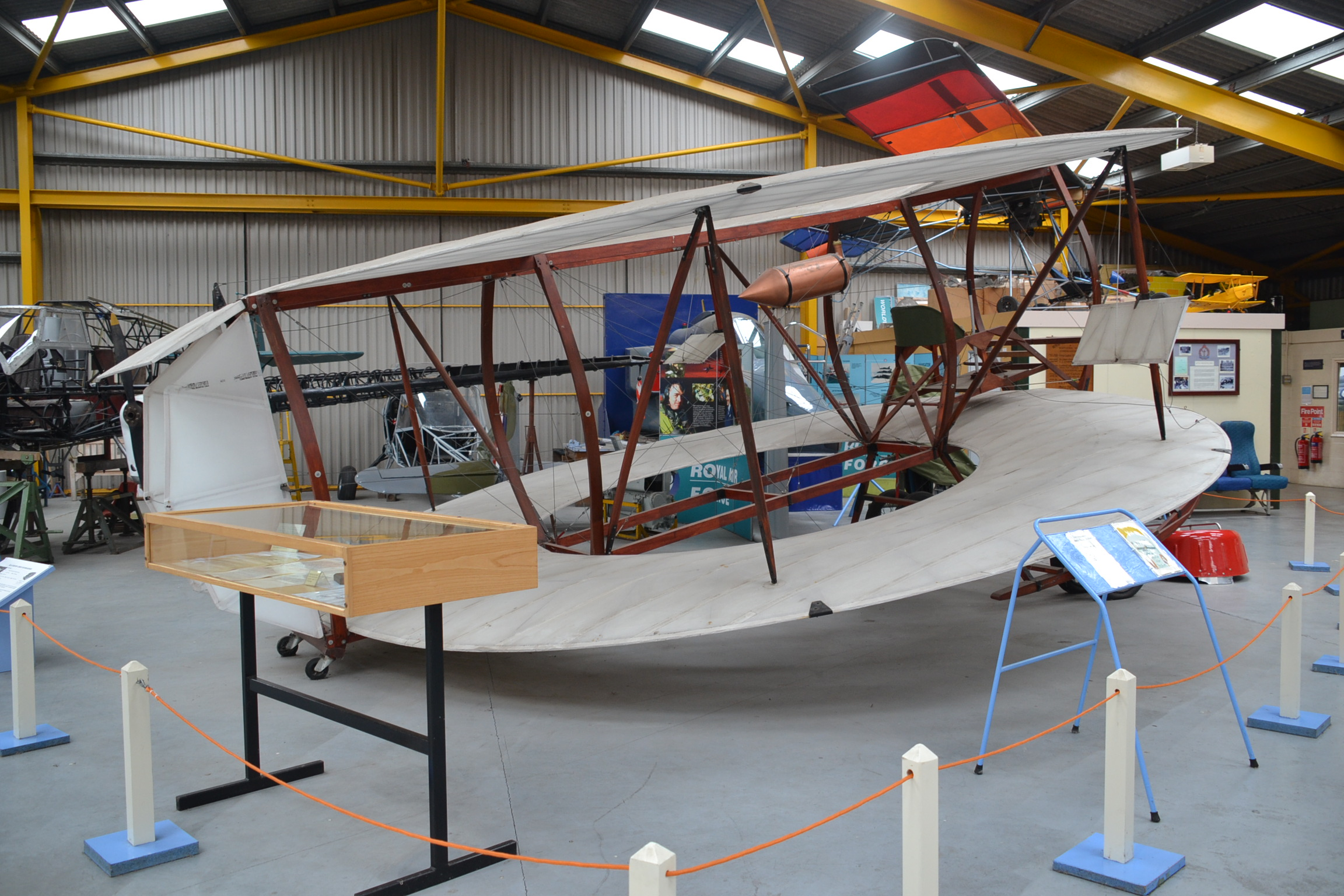
Non-flying replica of the biplane

Following a series of patents on circular-wing aircraft taken out by Williband Franz Zelger and Isaac Henry Storey, the boiler engineer John George Aulsebrook Kitchen built an annular-wing biplane but was unable to fly it. He later took out his own patent, while he and Storey also jointly patent an entirely different type of multiplane.

Kitchen subsequently sold both the patent and the machine to Cedric Lee, who would also later acquire Zelger's patent. Tilghman Richards joined Lee in 1910 and together they finished the aeroplane, fitting a 50 hp (37 kW) Gnome Omega engine in the front. The machine is known variously as the Kitchen annular biplane and the Lee-Richards annular biplane. Flight tests in 1911 were disappointing. That Autumn, the biplane was destroyed on the ground by high winds, when its hangar collapsed.

A non-flying replica later appeared in the 1965 film Those Magnificent Men in Their Flying Machines and is now on display at the Newark Air Museum.

=== Annular glider ===
Lee and Richards continued experimenting with models. They developed a form having a circular lower wing with an auxiliary plane above the front half of the main wing. A full-size manned glider proved successful.

=== Annular monoplanes ===
Model tests of a new design at the National Physics Laboratory gave promising results, suggesting that an annular monoplane would be aerodynamically stable and have benign stalling characteristics.

The first full-size monoplane was taken for its maiden flight in 1913 by Gordon England. It was found to be stable in the air but was tail-heavy and crashed when the engine failed. Gordon England survived to fly the next one.

A second example was built with modified tail surfaces. It was flown by Gordon England, C. Gordon Bell and N. S. Percival. It too was stable and was reported to be pleasant to fly. Bell subsequently crashed it, also surviving.

The third and last monoplane to fly was further modified and was also pleasant to fly. It was used regularly until the outbreak of war in 1914. Lee himself then tried to fly it but succeeded only in crashing it into a lake before swimming to the shore.

Two further examples were under construction in 1914, with the intention of competing in the next planned Gordon Bennett air race, however they were never completed.

=== Later work ===
Tilghman Richards continued to promote the benefits of the annular wing, but without success. While working for Beardmore in 1916 he patented an improved method of construction. He went on to work for the Science Museum, London, where a model of a Lee-Richards annular monoplane is on display.

During World War I Lee ended up with the Royal Naval Volunteer Reserve (RNVR) and was subsequently killed in action.

== The annular monoplane ==
The wing itself took the form of a flat ring or annulus, curved to form an aerofoil shape in section and with upward dihedral raising it progressively towards the tips. The leading edge of the front portion was initially curved downwards to promote vortex lift over the side and rear surfaces.

The annular wing was crossed by a central fuselage running between the fore and aft sections of the wing. The wing was rigged with a significant angle of incidence, the forward section being level with the top of the fuselage and the aft section with the lower fuselage. The column of air flowing through the central hole was intended to improve the wing's stability in flight.

In the initial design, elevon (combined elevator and aileron) control surfaces were set into the trailing edge of the aft wing section, on either side of a vertical rudder. On the second machine the elevons were moved outwards and additional elevons placed above them, with various arrangements being tried. The third machine retained the outboard elevons behind a modified wing and discarded the upper surfaces.

Provision for two crew was made and an 80 hp (60 kW) Gnome engine located in the front, driving a tractor propeller. The undercarriage was a tricycle arrangement.

The circular planform allowed the wing span to be narrower than a conventional wing, making the aircraft even more unusual for its period in being longer than it was wide.

== Specifications ==
Data from Lewis (1962)

General characteristics

- Crew: Two
- Length: 23 ft 3 in (7.09 m)
- Wingspan: 22 ft 0 in (10.16 m)
- Wing area: 280 sq ft (26 m^{2})
- Gross weight: 1,680 lb (762 kg)
- Powerplant: 1 × Gnome Lambda 7-cylinder air-cooled rotary piston engine, 80 hp (60 kW)
- Propellers: Two-bladed

Performance

- Maximum speed: 85 mph (137 km/h, 74 kn)
- Endurance: 3.5 hrs

== See also ==
- Aerobie flying ring toy
- Chakram flying ring weapon
- Circular wing
- Closed wing

Aircraft of comparable role, configuration, and era

- Edwards Rhomboidal
