= Raoul Hoffman =

Jewish engineer and writer

Raoul J. Hoffman was a Hungarian-born Jewish engineer and writer who moved to the United States of America notable for the aircraft he designed or helped to design.

== Aircraft design ==
Hoffman helped develop the Laird Super Solution racer, and Owl Trimotor. Later he worked for C.L. Snyder's company Arup Manufacturing Corporation, developing a series of tailless aircraft known as the Arup S-1, and S-2. When diagnosed with tuberculosis, Hoffman moved to St. Petersburg, Florida and developed his own version for a customer in Chicago, Illinois. After poor performance, and arson destroying the Arup S-3 follow-on, Hoffman returned to Arup to develop the Arup S-4.

== Hoffman's aircraft ==
Hoffman Heel Wing
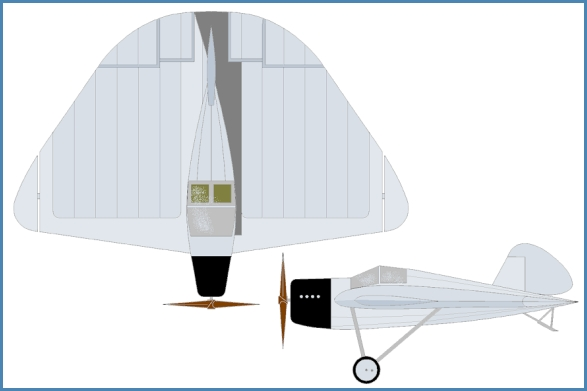

General information
- Type: Blended wing aircraft
- National origin: United States of America
- Designer: Raoul J. Hoffman
- Number built: 1

History
- First flight: 1934

The aircraft which Hoffman designed during his absence from Arup was of similar tailless semi-circular "heel wing" configuration to the Arup designs. It is sometimes mistakenly described as a flying wing, but in fact it has a pronounced fuselage nacelle protruding above and forward of the wing.

=== Design and development ===
The chord of Hoffman's own design spanned from the rear of the cowling along the entire fuselage of the aircraft. The thickness of the wing was up to 20 in (51 cm) at the root. From the top the wing appeared semi-circular with a slightly swept leading edge. The aircraft used a conventional taildragger configuration with retractable landing gear. The center section and controls were welded steel tubing, and the rest was spruce wood with aircraft fabric covering.

=== Operational history ===
The test aircraft used fixed landing gear for trials. Test flights were successful, with the aircraft winning an impromptu race against a 165 hp (123 kW) conventional aircraft. Visibility was noted as poor compared to conventional aircraft. During later 1936 testing, the prototype caught fire and crashed, from leaking fuel lines, killing its test pilot.

=== Specifications ===
Data from Popular Aviation

General characteristics

- Capacity: 2
- Length: 17 ft 8 in (5.38 m)
- Wingspan: 22 ft 8 in (6.91 m)
- Wing area: 237 sq ft (22.0 m^{2})
- Airfoil: M6 at root M1 at tips
- Empty weight: 900 lb (408 kg)
- Fuel capacity: 16 US gallons (61 litres)
- Powerplant: 1 × ADC Cirrus , 85 hp (63 kW)
- Propellers: 2-bladed, 7 ft (2.1 m) diameter

Performance

- Maximum speed: 117 kn (135 mph, 217 km/h)
- Stall speed: 24 kn (28 mph, 45 km/h)

== See also ==
Aircraft of comparable role, configuration, and era

- 1918 Stout Batwing
- Arup S-4
