= CKAP2 =

Protein-coding gene in humans

Identifiers
- Aliases: CKAP2, LB1, TMAP, se20-10, cytoskeleton associated protein 2
- External IDs: OMIM: 611569; MGI: 1931797; HomoloGene: 10070; GeneCards: CKAP2; OMA:CKAP2 - orthologs

Gene location (Human)
Chr.	Chromosome 13 (human)
Band	13q14.3	Start	52,455,429 bp
Band	13q14.3	End	52,476,628 bp

Gene location (Mouse)
Chr.	Chromosome 8 (mouse)
Band	8|8 A2	Start	22,658,176 bp
Band	8|8 A2	End	22,675,835 bp
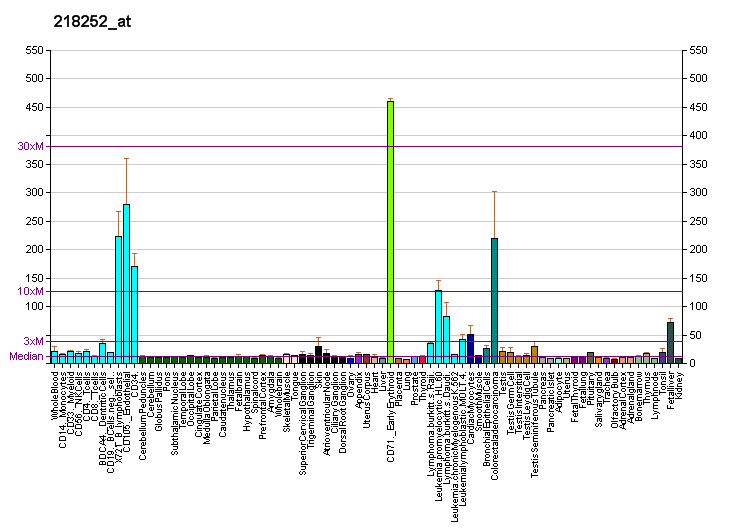
RNA expression pattern
Bgee	Human / Mouse (ortholog); Top expressed in: ventricular zone; ganglionic eminence; oocyte; secondary oocyte; testicle; gonad; bone marrow; trabecular bone; monocyte; bone marrow cell / Top expressed in: secondary oocyte; zygote; ventricular zone; primary oocyte; medial ganglionic eminence; endothelial cell of lymphatic vessel; fetal liver hematopoietic progenitor cell; otic placode; genital tubercle; hand; More reference expression data
BioGPS	More reference expression data
Orthologs
Species	Human	Mouse
Entrez	26586	80986
Ensembl	ENSG00000136108	ENSMUSG00000037725
UniProt	Q8WWK9	Q3V1H1
RefSeq (mRNA)	NM_001098525; NM_001286686; NM_001286687; NM_018204	NM_001004140
RefSeq (protein)	NP_001091995; NP_001273615; NP_001273616; NP_060674	NP_001004140
Location (UCSC)	Chr 13: 52.46 – 52.48 Mb	Chr 8: 22.66 – 22.68 Mb
PubMed search
- Wikidata
View/Edit Human	View/Edit Mouse

Cytoskeleton-associated protein 2 is a protein that in humans is encoded by the CKAP2 gene.

Human CKAP2 gene, the cDNA of which is known as LB1, is a cytoskeleton-associated protein involved in mitotic progression. Its high transcriptional activity has been observed in the testes, thymus, and diffuse B-cell lymphomas. The gene codes for a protein of 683 residues, which lacks a homology to known amino acid sequences. On evidence of immunofluorescence analysis, the CKAP2 product is a cytoplasmic protein associated with cytoskeletal fibrils. The CKAP2 gene is in chromosome 13q14. Rearrangements of this region result in various tumors. Thus deletions have been detected in multiple myeloma, prostate cancer, head-and-neck squamous-cell carcinoma, B-cell prolymphocytic leukemia, non-Hodgkin lymphoma, and in more than half cases of B-cell chronic lymphocytic leukemia.
