= Arup S-3 =

Low aspect ratio aircraft model

S-3

General information
- Type: Experimental aircraft
- National origin: United States of America
- Manufacturer: Arup Manufacturing Corporation
- Designer: Ralph Gaighen, Cloyd L. Snyder
- Number built: 1

History
- First flight: 15 July 1934
- Developed from: Arup S-2
- Developed into: Arup S-4

The Arup S-3 was the third in a series of low aspect ratio aircraft developed by Dr. Snyder of South Bend, Indiana.

== Design and development ==
Raoul Hoffman worked to engineer the Arup S-2 with Dr. Snyder. Around 1933 he was diagnosed with tuberculosis and left the company for the warmer climate of Florida where he developed his own variation, the Hoffman Flying Wing. He was replaced by Ralph Graigen to develop the next generation of the aircraft.

The S-3 featured a straight leading edge with the trailing edge tapering back to the rear of the aircraft, giving it a thumbnail like appearance from the top. The aircraft featured a tall tricycle landing gear with a small tailwheel in case of over-rotation on takeoff. The fabric covered fuselage was made of welded steel tube with wooden wing ribs. The S-3 differed from the S-2 in that it included a small rudder and elevator at the rear of the fuselage, rather than placing all of the controls on the low aspect ratio wing. The fuselage was sharp-edged with a less streamlined windshield. The dihedral was inadvertently increased compared to the S-2 due to errors in the wing jigs.

== Operational history ==
The S-3 was assigned the number 14147. It flew only once at St.Joe county airport with Glen Doolittle as the test pilot; the aircraft displayed poor performance. Before the second flight signs of sabotage were discovered and the aircraft was put under day and night guard by the backers. The S-3 was destroyed by arson in a hangar fire shortly afterward. Gaighen was fired and Raoul Hoffman was brought back as lead engineer for Arup for the follow-on Arup S-4 which flew successfully with the reused engine from the fire damaged S-3.

== Variants ==
- Arup S-4

== Specifications (Arup S-3) ==
Data from Skyways and Aerofiles

General characteristics

- Length: 17 ft 6 in (5.33 m)
- Wingspan: 22 ft (6.7 m)
- Wing area: 273 sq ft (25.4 m^{2})
- Powerplant: 1 × LeBlond 5DE 5-cyl. air-cooled radial piston engine, 70 hp (52 kW)
