= Charles H. Zimmerman =

American aeronautical engineer (1908–1996)

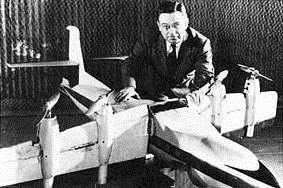
- Zimmerman with a wind tunnel model
- Born: 1908; Olathe, Kansas, U.S.
- Died: May 5, 1996; Hampton, Virginia, U.S.
- Education: University of Kansas degree in electrical engineering University of Virginia master's in aeronautical engineering 1954
- Spouse: Beatrice
- Children: Charles H. Zimmerman, Craig S. Zimmerman
- Engineering career
- Discipline: Aeronautical engineering
- Institutions: National Advisory Committee for Aeronautics
- Projects: Vought XF5U
- Significant design: Vought V-173
- Awards: Wright Brothers Medal

Charles Horton Zimmerman (1908 – May 5, 1996), was an aeronautical engineer, whose work on novel airfoil configurations led to several notable experimental aircraft programs.

== Early work ==
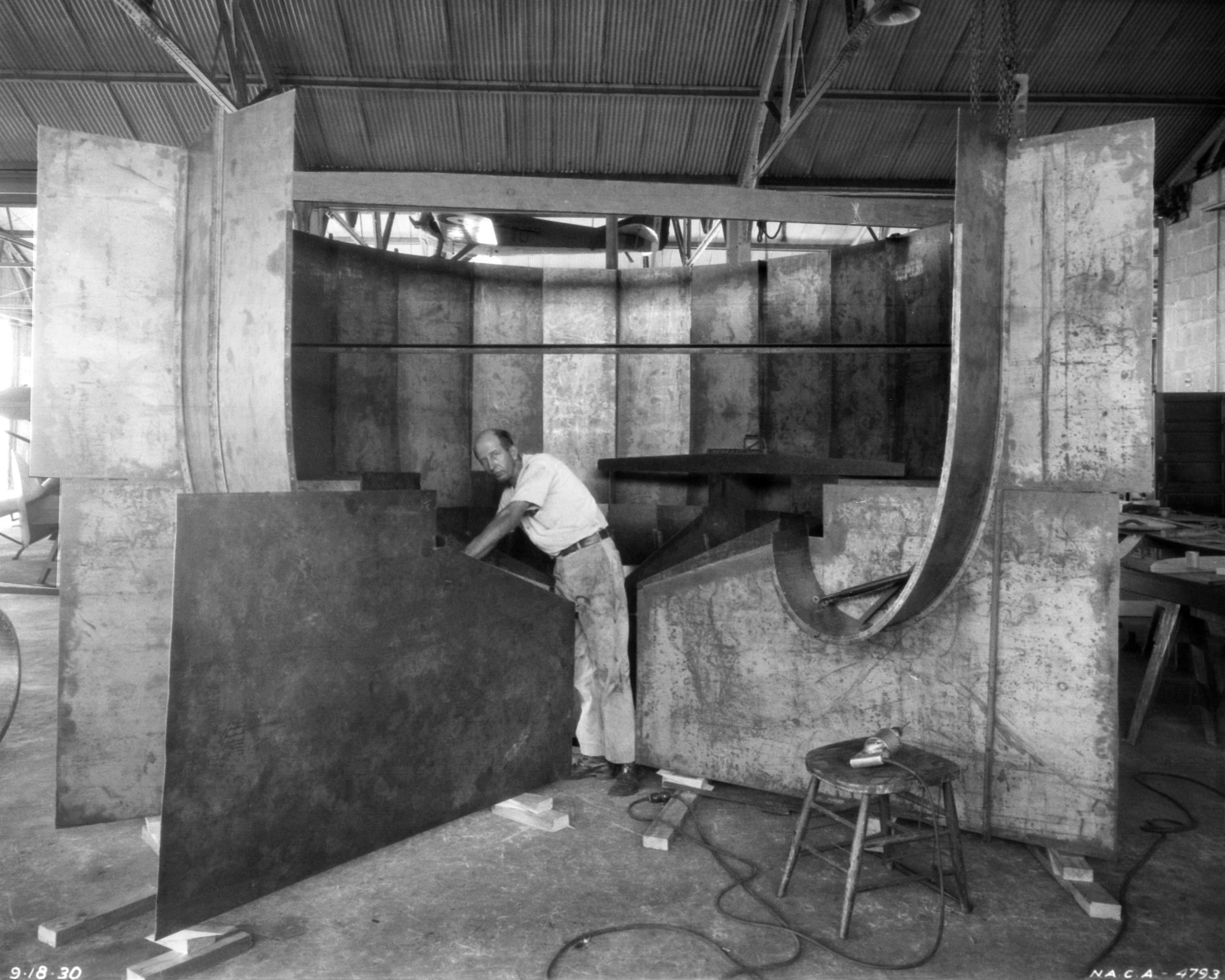
The 5 Foot Vertical Wind Tunnel was built to study spinning characteristics of aircraft. It was an open throat tunnel capable of a maximum speed of 80 mph. NACA engineer Charles H. Zimmerman designed the tunnel starting in 1928.

Zimmerman worked at Langley Memorial Aeronautical Laboratory in the 1930s on a variety of research topics, including loads, airfoils, and aircraft stability and design. During this time, he was also thinking about much more novel aspects of flight, especially how stability might be maintained. He theorized that the natural balancing reflexes of a person could be adequate to control very small flight vehicles, a concept he called "kinesthetic control". He was also interested in aspects that could lead to Vertical/Short Takeoff and Landing aircraft.

== Novel Flight Vehicles ==
Zimmerman's research posited aircraft having flat circular bodies, sans wings, as their lifting surface. In the 1940s, Zimmerman and the Navy began researching this idea, which led to the Vought XF5U, nicknamed the "flying pancake".

In 1953, Hiller Aircraft contracted with the Office of Naval Research to combine several research ideas, including Zimmerman's "kinesthetic" theory, to produce an airworthy "flying platform". The project was classified and conducted at Hiller's Advanced Research Division. In 1954, the prototype model 1031 was delivered. A 1956 Army contract produced the larger VZ-1 Pawnee.

== Awards ==
- Wright Brothers Medal in 1956
- Dr. Alexander Klemin Award in 1956 from the American Helicopter Society
