= Vought XF5U =

Experimental US Navy fighter aircraft

XF5U
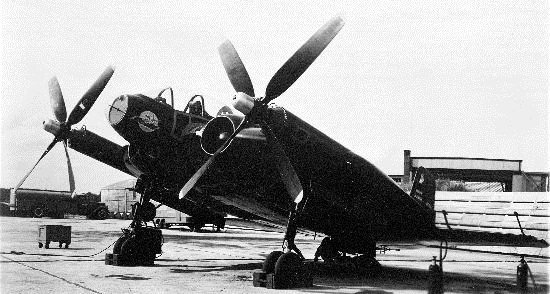
- The XF5U-1 during testing

General information
- Type: Fighter
- Manufacturer: Vought
- Designer: Charles H. Zimmerman
- Status: Cancelled 17 March 1947
- Primary user: United States Navy
- Number built: 2

History
- Developed from: Vought V-173

The Vought XF5U "Flying Flapjack" was an experimental U.S. Navy fighter aircraft designed by Charles H. Zimmerman for Vought during World War II. This unorthodox design consisted of a flat, somewhat disc-shaped body (resembling a flying flapjack/pancake, hence its nickname) serving as the lifting surface. Two piston engines buried in the body drove propellers located on the leading edge, at the wingtips.

== Design and development ==
A developed version of the original V-173 prototype, the XF5U-1 was a larger aircraft. Of all-metal construction, it was almost five times heavier, with two 1,400 hp (1,193 kW) Pratt & Whitney R-2000 radial engines. The configuration was designed to create a low aspect ratio aircraft with low takeoff and landing speeds but high top speed. The aircraft was designed to keep the low stall speed and high angle of attack from the V-173 prototype while providing for better pilot visibility, cockpit comfort, less vibration, and provisions to install armament. This included a cockpit redesign moving the cockpit from the leading edge of the wing to a nose nacelle that extended further in front of the leading edge. The arrestor hook was changed to a dorsal hook that would diminish the drag from the apparatus.

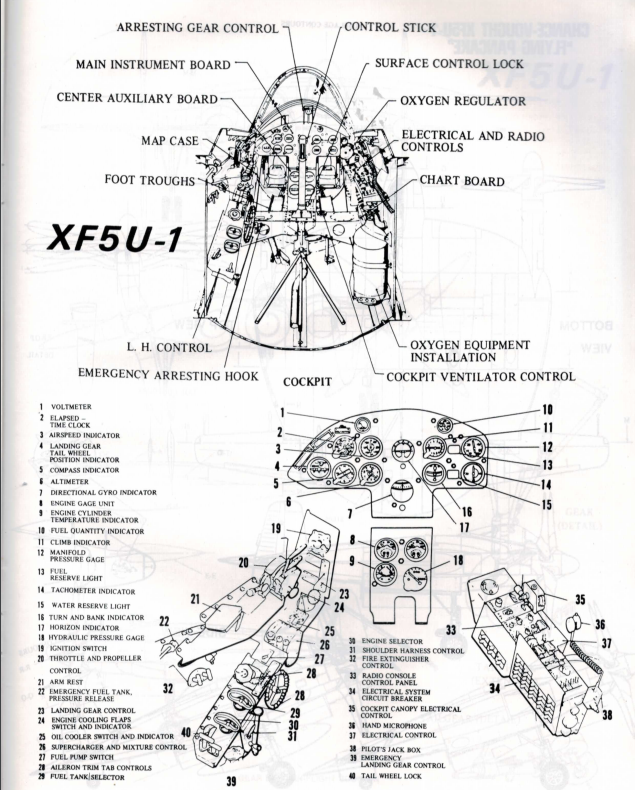
XF5U-1 cockpit

Normally, a wing with such a low aspect ratio will suffer from very poor performance due to the degree of induced drag created at the wingtips, as the higher pressure air below spills around the wingtip to the lower-pressure region above. In a conventional aircraft, these wingtip vortices carry a lot of energy with them and hence create drag. The usual approach to reducing these vortices is to build a wing with a high aspect ratio, i.e. one that is long and narrow. However, such wings compromise the maneuverability and roll rate of the aircraft, or present a structural challenge in building them stiff enough. The XF5U attempted to overcome the tip vortex problem using the propellers to actively cancel the drag-causing tip vortices. The propellers are arranged to rotate in the opposite direction to the tip vortices, with the aim of retaining the higher-pressure air below the wing. With this source of drag eliminated, the aircraft would fly with a much smaller wing area, and the small wing would yield high maneuverability with greater structural strength.

The propellers envisioned for the completed fighter — unlike the torque-reducing counter-rotating propellers of the V-173 design — were to have a built-in cyclic movement like a helicopter's main rotor, with a very limited ability to shift their center of lift up and down to aid the aircraft in maneuvering. Initially, the aircraft used propellers originally designed for the V-173 prototype. These propellers would be replaced with propellers taken from the Vought F4U-4 Corsair. An ejection seat was fitted to allow the pilot to clear the massive propellers in the event of an in-flight emergency. Although the prototype was unarmed, a combination of six M2 Browning 50-caliber machine guns or four M3 20 mm cannons would be mounted in the wing roots in service.

== Testing and evaluation ==
The V-173 and F5U design was considered promising, and possibly capable of great maneuverability and speeds of up to 452 mph (727 km/h). Two prototypes were constructed. Taxi trials of the XF5U-1 at Vought's Connecticut factory culminated in short "hops" that were not true flights. Suggestions that the XF5U-1 flew were likely a result of confusion with the V-173, which underwent flight tests until 1945. During these ground runs the XF5U-1 reportedly experienced severe vibration problems.

By 1946, the project was long over its expected development time, and well over budget. With jet aircraft coming into service, the US Navy officially canceled the F5U project on 17 March 1947. The only completed XF5U-1 proved to be so structurally solid that the steel ball with which the breakers attempted to smash the Flapjack just bounced off its Metalite-skinned wing with scarcely a dent, and blow-torches had to be used to cut it apart. The prototype V-173 was transferred to the Smithsonian Museum for display.

== Specifications (XF5U-1) ==
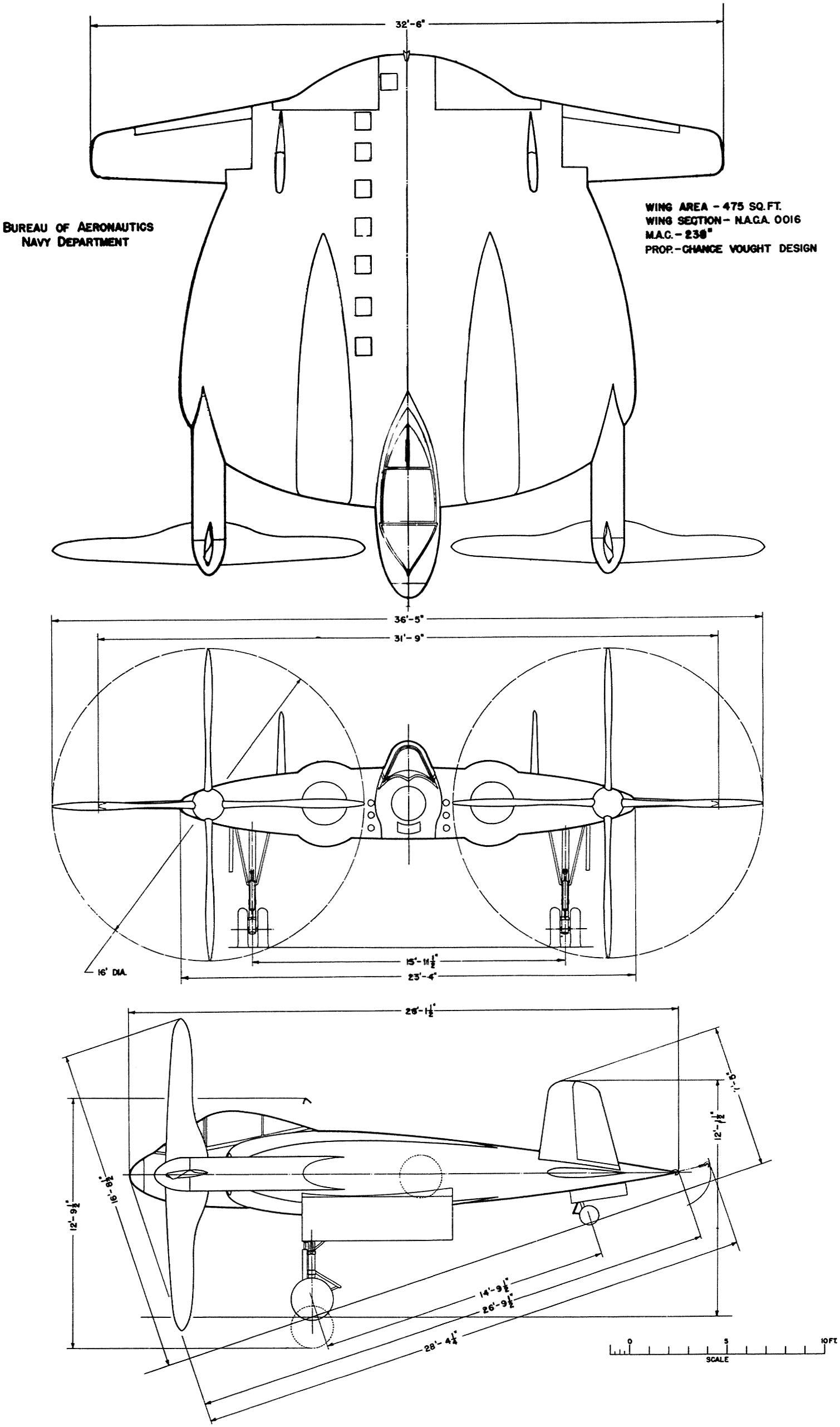
3-view line drawing of the Vought XF5U

General characteristics

- Crew: 1 pilot
- Length: 28 ft 7 in (8.73 m)
- Wingspan: 32 ft 6 in (9.91 m)
- Height: 14 ft 9 in (4.50 m)
- Wing area: 475 sq ft (44.2 m^{2})
- Empty weight: 13,107 lb (5,958 kg)
- Gross weight: 16,722 lb (7,600 kg)
- Max takeoff weight: 18,772 lb (8,533 kg)
- Powerplant: 2 × Pratt & Whitney XR-2000-2 radial engine, 1,350 hp (1,007 kW) each

Performance

- Maximum speed: 452 mph (727 km/h, 393 kn) at 28,000 ft (8,500 m) (estimated)
- Stall speed: 20 mph (32 km/h, 17 kn)
- Range: 710 mi (1,142 km, 620 nmi)
- Service ceiling: 34,500 ft (10,516 m)
- Rate of climb: 3,120 ft/min (15.8 m/s) or 910 m/min
- Wing loading: 39.2 lb/sq ft (191 kg/m^{2})

Armament

- 6 × .50 (12.7 mm) machine guns or 4 × M3 20 mm cannons
- 2 × 1,000 lb (450 kg) bombs

== See also ==
Related development

- Vought V-173

Aircraft of comparable role, configuration, and era

- Sack AS-6
- Nemeth Parasol

Related lists

- List of fighter aircraft
- List of United States Navy aircraft designations (pre-1962)
- List of military aircraft of the United States
