= Arup S-4 =

C.L. Snyder aircraft

S-4
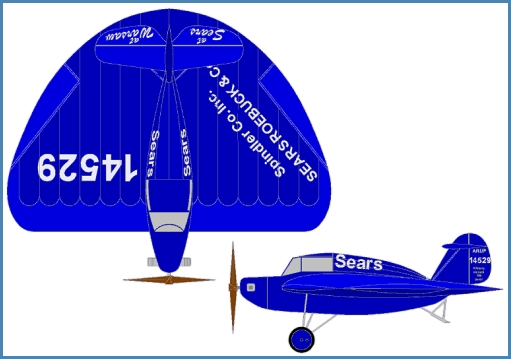

General information
- Type: Blended wing body aircraft
- National origin: United States of America
- Manufacturer: Arup Manufacturing Corporation
- Designer: Dr. C.L. Snyder, Raoul Hoffman
- Number built: 1

History
- Introduction date: 1935
- First flight: 19 March 1935
- Retired: bought and flown with a patched crack in its wood spar to a museum in the Dallas Ft Worth area in the early 70s
- Developed from: Arup S-3

The Arup S-4 (Model 104) is the last in a series of round-wing aircraft from C.L. Snyder.

== Design and development ==
The S-4 was engineered by Raoul Hoffman. The test pilot was Glenn Doolittle, a cousin of Jimmy Doolittle.

The S-4 used a low aspect ratio, semi-circular planform wing with a conventional landing gear and a small rudder with attached elevator on the rear of the fuselage. The aircraft was entered through a door mounted on the bottom of the aircraft.

== Operational history ==
The S-4 prototype flew extensively in promotional demonstrations. The S-4 was emblazoned with Sears Roebuck and Company logos. The aircraft was scrapped for war materials in World War II.

== Variants ==
- Hoffman Flying Wing a design based on the Arup S-4 aircraft.
- Milt Hatfield Little Bird - similar design.

== Aircraft on display ==
A replica is on display in the atrium of South Bend International Airport

== Specifications (S-4) ==
Data from Janes, Popular Aviation

General characteristics

- Capacity: 2
- Length: 18 ft 6 in (5.64 m)
- Wingspan: 22 ft (6.7 m)
- Wing area: 273 sq ft (25.4 m^{2})
- Airfoil: NACA M-6
- Empty weight: 650 lb (295 kg)
- Gross weight: 1,200 lb (544 kg)
- Fuel capacity: 18
- Powerplant: 1 × LeBlond 70-5 5-cyl. air-cooled radial piston engine, 70 hp (52 kW)
- Maximum speed: 100 kn (115 mph, 185 km/h)
- Service ceiling: 9,000 ft (2,700 m)
- Rate of climb: 580 ft/min (2.9 m/s)
