= Boeing 2707 =

Cancelled American supersonic passenger airliner

- Three views of a Boeing 2707-300

General information
- Type: Supersonic airliner
- National origin: United States
- Manufacturer: Boeing Commercial Airplanes
- Status: Cancelled in 1971

The Boeing 2707 was an American supersonic passenger airliner project during the 1960s. After winning a competition for a government-funded contract to build an American supersonic airliner, Boeing began development at its facilities in Seattle, Washington. The design emerged as a large aircraft with seating for 250 to 300 passengers and cruise speeds of approximately Mach 3. It was intended to be much larger and faster than competing supersonic transport (SST) designs such as the Concorde.

The SST was the topic of considerable concern within and outside the aviation industry. From the start, the airline industry noted that the economics of the design were questionable, concerns that were only partially addressed during development. Outside the field, the entire SST concept was the subject of considerable negative press, centered on the issue of sonic booms and effects on the ozone layer.

A key design feature of the 2707 was its use of a swing-wing configuration. During development, the required weight and size of this mechanism continued to grow, forcing the team to switch to a conventional delta wing. Rising costs, environmental concerns, noise, and the lack of a clear market led to its cancellation in 1971 before two prototypes were completed.

== Development ==
=== Early studies ===
Boeing began small-scale SST studies in 1952. In 1958, it established a permanent SST research group, which was spending $1 million a year by 1960 (equivalent to $10,883,000 in 2025). It proposed a variety of alternative designs, all under the name Model 733. Most of the designs featured a large delta wing, but in 1959 another design was offered as an offshoot of Boeing's efforts in the swing-wing TFX program. In 1960, Boeing ran an internal competition for a 150 seat transatlantic SST design, and the swing-wing version won.

Shortly after taking office, President John F. Kennedy tasked the Federal Aviation Administration with preparing a report on "national aviation goals for the period between now and 1970". The study was prompted in the wake of several accidents, which led to the belief that the industry was becoming moribund. Two projects were started, Project Beacon on new navigational systems and air traffic control, and Project Horizon on advanced civil aviation developments.

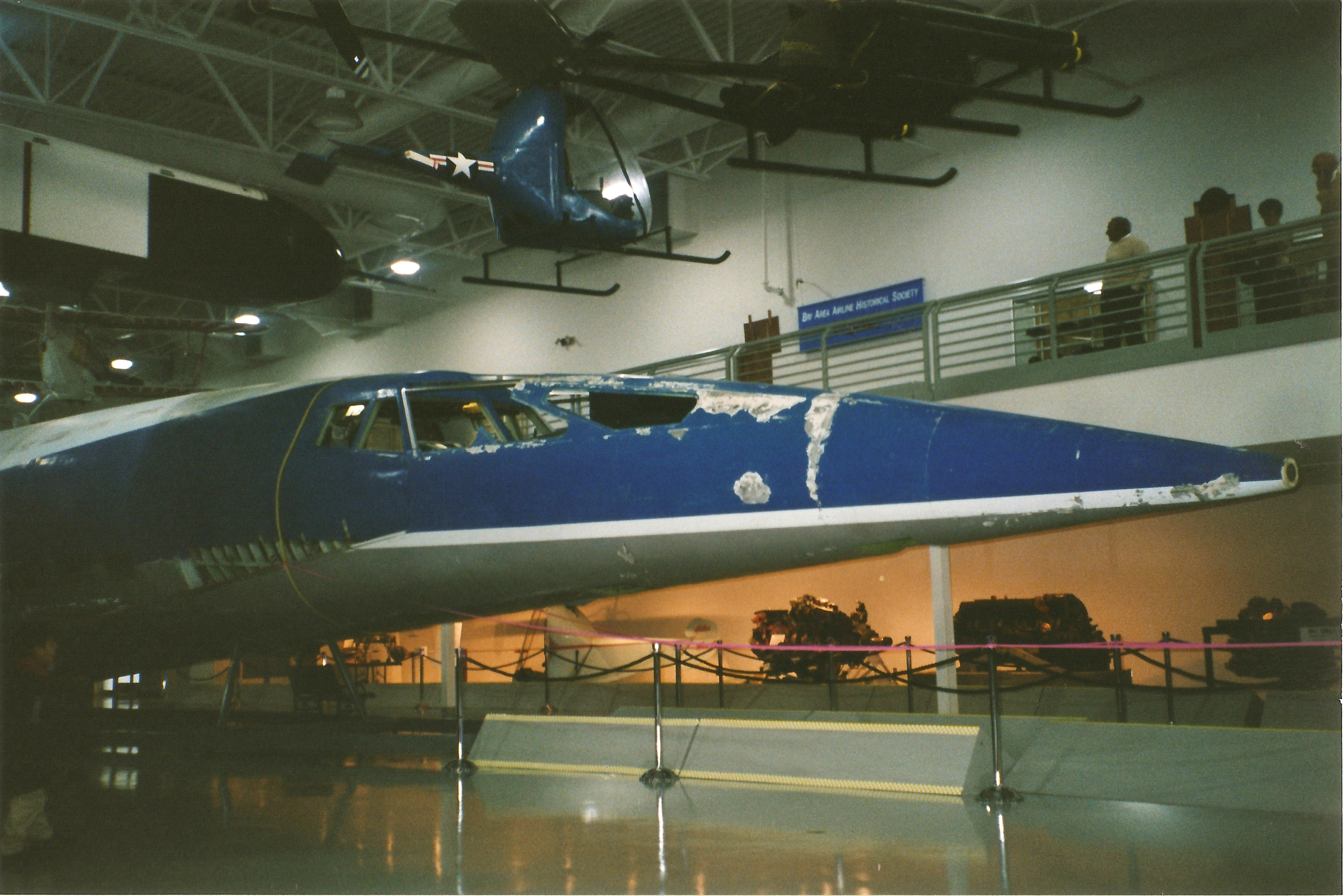
Boeing 2707 mockup at the Hiller Aviation Museum

Only one month later the FAA's new director, Najeeb Halaby, produced the Commission on National Aviation Goals, better known as Project Horizon. Among other suggestions, the report was used as a platform to promote the SST. Halaby argued that a failure to enter this market would be a "stunning setback". The report was met with skepticism by most others. Kennedy had put Lyndon Johnson on the SST file, and he turned to Robert McNamara for guidance. McNamara was highly skeptical of the SST project and savaged Halaby's predictions; he was also afraid the project might be turned over to the DoD and was careful to press for further studies.

The basic concept behind the SST was that its fast flight would allow them to fly more trips than a subsonic aircraft, leading to higher utilization. However, it did this at the cost of greatly increased fuel use. If fuel costs were to change dramatically, SSTs would not be competitive. These problems were well understood within the industry; the IATA released a set of "design imperatives" for an SST that were essentially impossible to meet—the release was a warning to promoters of the SST within the industry.

=== Concorde ===
By mid-1962, it was becoming clear in the US that tentative talks earlier that year between the British Aircraft Corporation and Sud Aviation (later Aérospatiale) on a merger of their SST projects were more serious than originally thought. In November 1962, still to the surprise of many, the Concorde project was announced. In spite of marginal economics, nationalistic and political arguments had led to wide support for the project, especially from Charles de Gaulle. This set off something of a wave of panic in the US, as it was widely believed that almost all future commercial aircraft would be supersonic, and it looked like the Europeans would start off with a huge lead. As if this were not enough, it soon became known that the Soviets were also working on a similar design.

Three days after the Concorde announcement, Halaby wrote a letter to Kennedy suggesting that if they did not immediately start their own SST effort, the US would lose 50,000 jobs, $4 billion in income, and $3 billion in capital as local carriers turned to foreign suppliers. A report from the Supersonic Transport Advisory Group (STAG) followed, noting that the European team was in the lead in basic development, and suggested competing by developing a more advanced design with better economics. At the time, more advanced generally meant higher speed. The baseline design in the report called for an aircraft with Mach 3 performance with 2,400 miles (3,900 km) range in order to serve the domestic market. They felt that there was no way to build a transatlantic design with that performance in time to catch the Concorde's introduction, abandoning the trans-Atlantic market to the Europeans.

In spite of vocal opponents, questions about the technical requirements, and extremely negative reports about its economic viability, the SST project gathered strong backing from industry and the FAA. Johnson sent a report to the president asking for $100 million in funding for FY 1964. This might have been delayed, but in May, Pan Am announced they had placed six options on the Concorde. Juan Trippe leaked the information earlier that month, stating that the airline would not ignore the SST market, and would buy from Europe if need be. Pan Am's interest in Concorde angered Kennedy, who called his administration to get Pan Am to redirect its potential funding back to the US SST program.

Kennedy introduced the National Supersonic Transport program on June 5, 1963, in a speech at the US Air Force Academy.

=== Design competition ===
Requests for proposals were sent out to airframe manufacturers Boeing, Lockheed, and North American for the airframes; and Curtiss-Wright, General Electric and Pratt & Whitney for engines. The FAA estimated that there would be a market for 500 SSTs by 1990. Despite not having a selected design, orders from air carriers started flowing in immediately. Preliminary designs were submitted to the FAA on January 15, 1964.

Boeing's entry was essentially identical to the swing-wing Model 733 studied in 1960; it was known officially as the Model 733-197, but also referred to both as the 1966 Model and the Model 2707. The latter name became the best known in public, while Boeing continued to use 733 model numbers internally. The design resembled the future B-1 Lancer bomber, with the exception that the four engines were mounted in individual nacelles instead of the paired pods used on the Lancer. The blended wing root spanned almost all of cabin area, and this early version had a much more stubby look than the models that would ultimately evolve. The wing featured extensive high-lift devices on both the leading and trailing edges, minimizing the thrust required, and thus noise created, during climb out. The proposal also included optional fuselage stretches that increased capacity from the normal 150 seats to 227.

Lockheed's entry, designated CL-823, was essentially an enlarged Concorde. Like the Concorde, it featured a long and skinny fuselage, engines under the wing, and a compound delta planform. The only major design difference was the use of individual pods for the engines, rather than pairs. The CL-823 lacked any form of high-lift devices on the wings, relying on engine power and long runways for liftoff, ensuring a huge noise footprint. The CL-823 was the largest of the first-round entries, with typical seating for 218.

The North American NAC-60 was essentially a scaled-up B-70 with a less tapered fuselage and new compound-delta wing. The design retained the high-mounted canard above the cockpit area, and the box-like engine area under the fuselage. The use of high-lift devices on the leading edge of the wing lowered the landing angles to the point where the "drooping nose" was not required, and a more conventional rounded design was used. Compared to the other designs, the rounded nose profile and more cylindrical cross-section gave the NAC-60 a decidedly more conventional look than the other entries. This also meant it would fly slower, at Mach 2.65.

A "downselect" of the proposed models resulted in the NAC-60 and Curtiss-Wright efforts being dropped from the program, with both Boeing and Lockheed asked to offer SST models meeting the more demanding FAA requirements and able to use either of the remaining engine designs from GE or P&W. In November, another design review was held, and by this time Boeing had scaled up the original design into a 250-seat model, the Model 733-290. Due to concerns about jet blast, the four engines were moved to a position underneath an enlarged tailplane. When the wings were in their swept-back position, they merged with the tailplane to produce a delta wing planform.

Both companies were now asked for considerably more detailed proposals, to be presented for final selection in 1966. When this occurred, Boeing's design was now the 300-seat Model 733-390. Both the Boeing and Lockheed L-2000 designs were presented in September 1966 along with full-scale mock-ups. After a lengthy review the Boeing design was announced as the winner on January 1, 1967. The design would be powered by the General Electric GE4/J5 engines. Lockheed's L-2000 was judged simpler to produce and less risky, but its performance was slightly lower and its noise levels slightly higher.

=== Refining the design ===
The 733-390 would have been an advanced aircraft even if it had been only subsonic. It was one of the earliest wide-body aircraft designs, with 2-3-2 row seating arrangement at its widest section in a fuselage that was considerably wider than aircraft then in service. The SST mock-up included both overhead storage for smaller items with restraining nets, as well as large drop-in bins between sections of the aircraft. In the main 247-seat tourist-class cabin, the entertainment system consisted of retractable televisions placed between every sixth row in the overhead storage. In the 30-seat first-class area, every pair of seats included smaller televisions in a console between the seats. Windows were only 6 inches (150 mm) due to the high altitudes the aircraft flew at maximizing the pressure on them, but the internal pane was 12 inches (300 mm) to give an illusion of size.

Boeing predicted that if the go-ahead were given, construction of the SST prototypes would begin in early 1967 and the first flight could be made in early 1970. Production aircraft could start being built in early 1969, with the flight testing in late 1972 and certification by mid-1974.

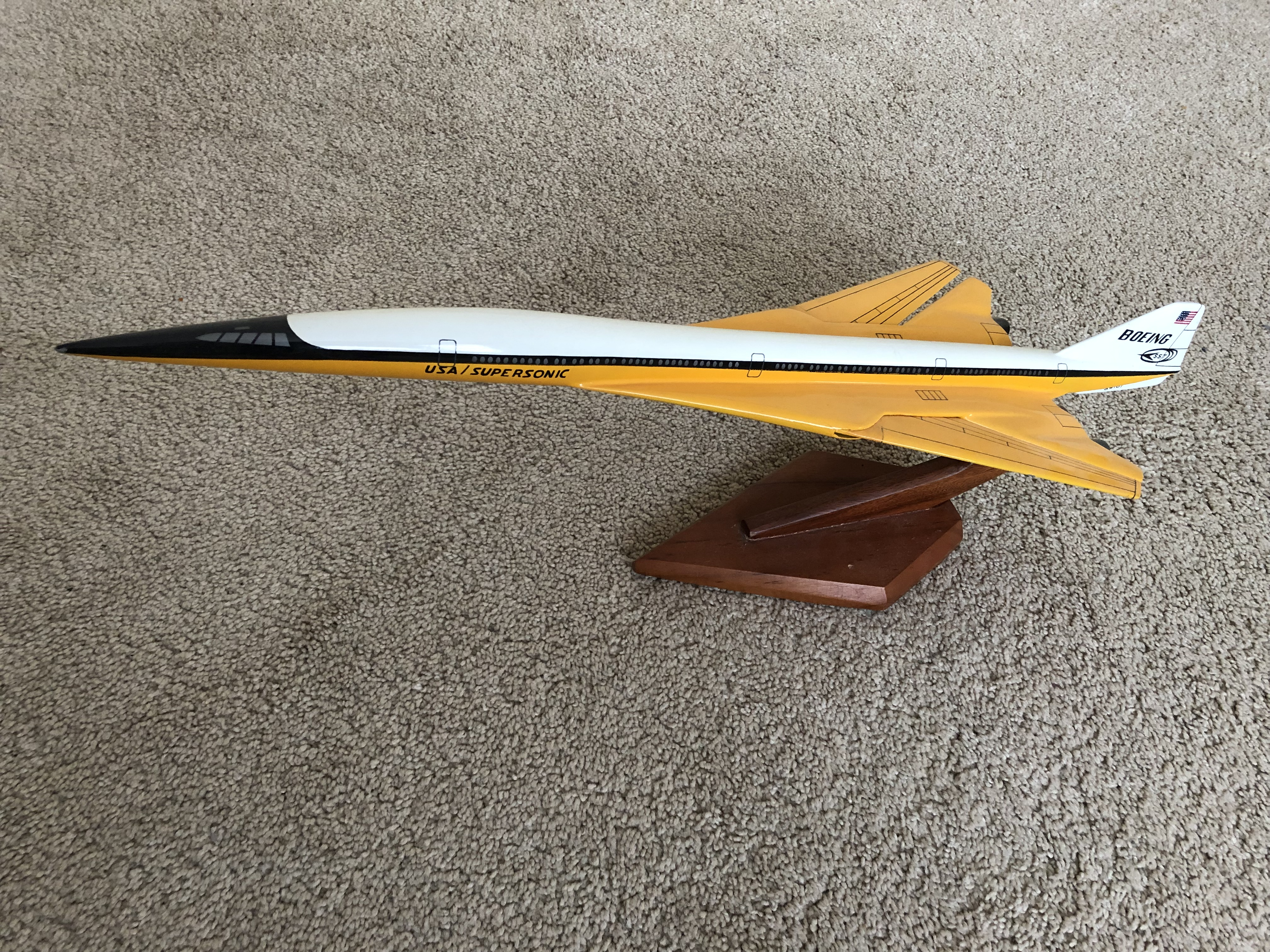
Model of Boeing SST

A major change in the design came when Boeing added canards behind the nose—which added weight. Boeing also faced insurmountable weight problems due to the swing-wing mechanism, a titanium pivot section having been fabricated with a weight of 4,600 pounds (2,100 kg) and measuring 11 feet (3.4 m) long and 2.5 feet (76 cm) thick, and the design could not achieve sufficient range. Flexing of the fuselage (it would have been the longest ever built) threatened to make control difficult. In October 1968, the company was finally forced to abandon the variable geometry wing. The Boeing team fell back on a tailed delta fixed wing. The new design was also smaller, seating 234, and known as the Model 2707-300. Work began on a full-sized mock-up and two prototypes in September 1969, now two years behind schedule.

A promotional film claimed that airlines would soon pay back the federal investment in the project, and it was projected that SSTs would dominate the skies with subsonic jumbo jets (such as Boeing's 747) being only a passing intermediate fad.

By October 1969, there were delivery positions reserved for 122 Boeing SSTs by 26 airlines, including Alitalia, Canadian Pacific Airlines, Pakistan International Airlines, Delta Air Lines, Iberia, KLM, Northwest Airlines, and World Airways.

=== Environmental concerns ===
By this point, the opposition to the project was becoming increasingly vocal. Environmentalists were the most influential group, voicing concerns about possible depletion of the ozone layer due to the high altitude flights, and about noise at airports, as well as from sonic booms.

The latter became the most significant rallying point, especially after the publication of the anti-SST paperback, SST and Sonic Boom Handbook edited by William Shurcliff, which claimed that a single flight would "leave a 'bang-zone' 50 miles (80 km) wide by 2,000 miles (3,200 km) long" along with a host of associated problems. During tests in 1964 with supersonic B-58, F-101, F-104, and F-106 aircraft near Oklahoma City, the path had a maximum width of 16 miles (26 km), but still resulted in 9,594 complaints of damage to buildings, 4,629 formal damage claims, and 229 claims for a total of $12,845.32, mostly for broken glass and cracked plaster. As the opposition widened, the claimed negative effects increased, including upsetting people who do delicate work (e.g., brain surgeons), and harming persons with nervous ailments.

One concern was that the water vapor released by the engines into the stratosphere would envelop the earth in a "global gloom". Presidential Adviser Russell Train warned that a fleet of 500 SSTs flying at 65,000 ft (20,000 m) for a period of years could raise stratospheric water content by as much as 50% to 100%. According to Train, this could lead to greater ground-level heat and hamper the formation of ozone. Later, an additional threat to the ozone was found in the exhaust's nitrogen oxides, a threat that was later validated by MIT. More recent analysis in 1995 by David W. Fahey, an atmospheric scientist at the National Oceanic and Atmospheric Administration, and others found that the drop in ozone would be from 1 to 2% if a fleet of 500 supersonic aircraft was operated. Fahey expressed the opinion that this would not be a fatal obstacle for an advanced SST development.

During the 1970s the alleged potential for serious ozone damage and the sonic boom worries were picked up by the Sierra Club, the National Wildlife Federation and the Wilderness Society. Supersonic flight over land in the United States was eventually banned, and several states added additional restrictions or banned Concorde outright.

Senator William Proxmire (D-Wisconsin) criticized the SST program as frivolous federal spending.

Halaby attempted to dismiss these concerns, stating "The supersonics are coming−as surely as tomorrow. You will be flying one version or another by 1980 and be trying to remember what the great debate was all about."

=== Government funding cut ===
In March 1971, despite the project's strong support by the administration of President Richard Nixon, the U.S. Senate rejected further funding. A counterattack was organized under the banner of the "National Committee for an American SST", which urged supporters to send in $1 to keep the program alive. Afterward, letters of support from aviation buffs, containing nearly $1 million worth of contributions, poured in. Labor unions also supported the SST project, worried that the winding down of both the Vietnam War and Apollo program would lead to mass unemployment in the aerospace sector. AFL-CIO President George Meany suggested that the race to develop a first-generation SST was already lost, but the US should "enter the competition for the second generation—the SSTs of the 1980s and 1990s".

Despite this newfound support, the House of Representatives also voted to end SST funding on May 20, 1971. The vote was highly contentious. Gerald Ford, then Republican Leader, shouted Meany's claims that "If you vote for the SST, you are ensuring 13,000 jobs today plus 50,000 jobs in the second tier and 150,000 jobs each year over the next ten years." Sidney Yates, leading the "no" camp, offered a then-uncommon motion to instruct conferees and eventually won the vote against further funding, 215 to 204.

At the time, there were 115 unfilled orders by 25 airlines, while Concorde had 74 orders from 16 customers. The prototypes by Boeing and Lockheed were never completed. Due to the loss of several government contracts and a downturn in the civilian aviation market, Boeing reduced its number of employees by more than 60,000. The SST became known as "the airplane that almost ate Seattle." As a result of the mass layoffs and so many people moving away from the city in search of work, a billboard was erected near Seattle–Tacoma International Airport in 1971 that read, "Will the last person leaving Seattle – turn out the lights".

=== Aftermath ===
The SST race has had several lasting effects on the industry as a whole. The first airliner to use a supercritical wing was the 1962 Vickers VC-10. This idea from the 1940s was developed further as part of the SST efforts in the US, and is now widely used on most jet aircraft. In Europe, the cooperation that allowed Concorde led to the formation of Airbus, Boeing's foremost competitor, with Aérospatiale becoming a main component of Airbus.

When Concorde was launched, sales were predicted to be 150 aircraft, but only 14 aircraft were built for commercial service. Service entry was only secured through large government funding subsidy. These few aircraft went on to have a very long in-service flight life and were claimed to be ultimately commercially successful for their operators, until finally removed from service in the aftermath of the type's only crash in 2000 and the 9/11 terrorist attacks when Airbus decided to end servicing arrangements.

Its Soviet counterpart, the Tupolev Tu-144, was less successful, operating for only 55 passenger flights before being permanently grounded for various reasons.

With the ending of the 2707 project, the entire SST field in the U.S. was moribund for some time. By the mid-1970s, minor advances, combined, appeared to offer greatly improved performance. Through the second half of the 1970s, NASA provided funding for the Advanced Supersonic Transport (AST) project at several companies, including McDonnell Douglas, Boeing, and Lockheed. Considerable wind tunnel testing of the various models was carried out at NASA's Langley Research Center.

Although British Airways operated Concorde at a profit of around £30 million a year, Air France and British Airways announced the retirement of the only two remaining supersonic transport fleets in 2003; citing rising maintenance costs, low passenger numbers following the 25 July 2000 crash, and the slump in air travel following the September 11 attacks. As of 2026 no commercial supersonic transports are operating.

=== Legacy ===
The Museum of Flight in Seattle has a British Airways Concorde parked a few blocks from the building where the original 2707 mockup was housed in Seattle. While the Soviet Tu-144 had a short service life, Concorde was successful enough to fly as a small luxury fleet from 1976 until 2003, with British Airways lifetime costs of £1bn producing £1.75bn in revenues in the niche transatlantic market. As the most advanced supersonic transports became some of the oldest airframes in the fleet, profits eventually fell, due to rising maintenance costs.

The final-configuration Boeing 2707 mockup was sold to a museum and displayed at the SST Aviation Exhibit Center in Kissimmee, Florida, from 1973 to 1981. In 1983, the building, complete with SST, was purchased by the Faith World church. For years the Osceola New Life Assembly of God held services there with the airplane still standing above. In 1990, the mock-up was sold to aircraft restorer Charles Bell, who moved it, in pieces, to Merritt Island, in order to preserve it while it waited for a new home as the church now wanted the space for expansion. The forward fuselage was on display at the Hiller Aviation Museum of San Carlos, California, for many years, but in early 2013, was moved back to Paine Field in Everett, Washington, where it is undergoing restoration at a Museum of Flight facility.

Seattle's National Basketball Association (NBA) basketball team, formed in 1967, was named the Seattle SuperSonics (shortened to "Sonics"). The name was inspired by the newly won SST contract.

== Variants ==
External image
- Line drawings of variants

2707-100
Variable sweep wing
2707-200
Same as -100, but with canards
2707-300
Stationary wing
