= John Leland Atwood =

American aerospace engineer and executive (1904–1999)

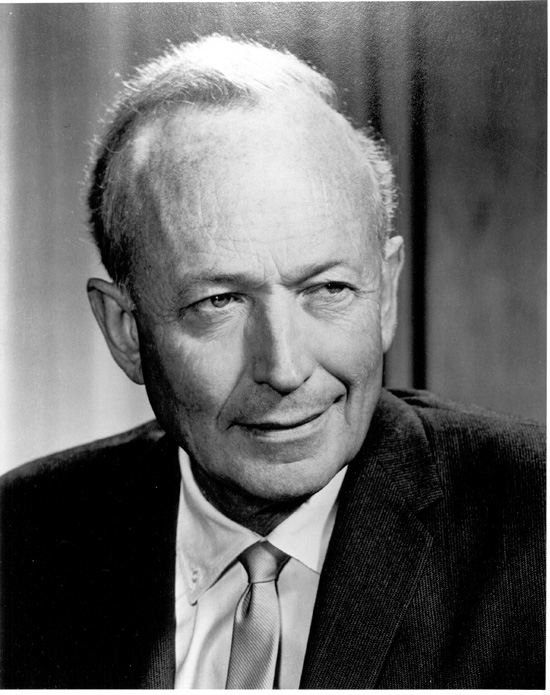
- Born: October 26, 1904; Walton, Kentucky, U.S.
- Died: March 5, 1999 (aged 94); Santa Monica, California, U.S.
- Other name: "Lee"
- Education: Hardin-Simmons University (BA); University of Texas (BS)
- Known for: North American Aviation; Rockwell International

John Leland "Lee" Atwood (October 26, 1904 – March 5, 1999) was an American aerospace engineer who worked as Chief Engineer/Executive at North American Aviation for over 35 years, succeeding Dutch Kindelberger as president and CEO. He developed the P-51 Mustang during World War II, the F-100 jet fighter, the X-15 rocket plane, and oversaw the Apollo program.

== Early life ==
Atwood was born in Walton, Kentucky, on October 26, 1904, to Reverend Dr. Elmer Bugg Atwood and Mabel Bagby Atwood. His younger brother was the linguist Elmer Bagby Atwood. He studied at Hardin-Simmons University from 1924 to 1926, earned a Bachelor of Arts degree, and then took postgraduate engineering courses at the University of Texas, to obtain his Bachelor of Science degree in 1928.

== Career ==
Atwood worked for Douglas Aircraft Company in Southern California, and joined North American Aviation in 1934. He quickly became a vice-president and in 1938 was appointed deputy general manager of North American Aviation. In 1941, he became First Vice President.

=== World War II ===
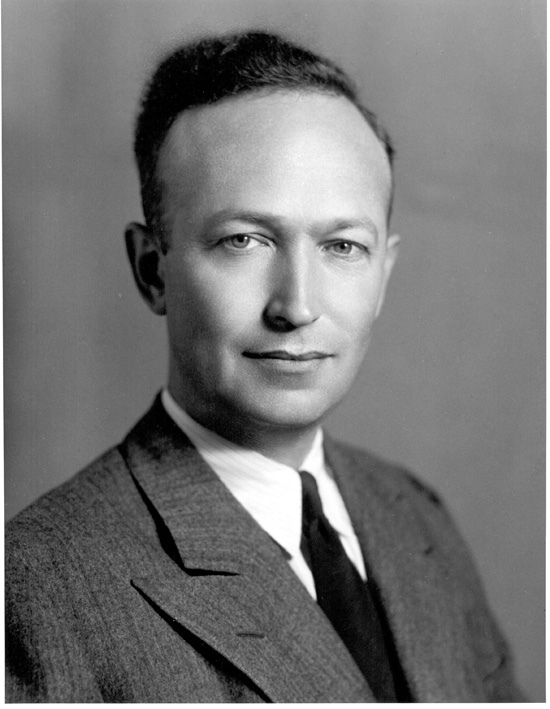
John Leland Atwood

Among the aircraft designed and built by North American during World War II: the P-51 Mustang fighter plane, which achieved particularly impressive results in the Eighth Air Force; the B-25 Mitchell medium bomber, used by Jimmy Doolittle and 79 airmen in the famous Doolittle Raid; and the T-6 Texan, which almost all American and British Commonwealth airmen of the Second World War flew in training.

=== Post war ===
Atwood later became president of North American Aviation in 1948 and oversaw the development of some of the most important aircraft produced in the United States. These included the F-86 Sabre, which has shown a 10-to-1 superiority over Soviet MiG-15s, during the Korean War. Others include the F-100 Super Sabre, X-15 rocket plane, XB-70 Valkyrie bomber, and the B-1 Lancer bomber.

After World War II, Atwood used North American's resources to make its business indispensable in new high-tech fields such as winning the Apollo program, headed by Harrison Storms..

In 1960 he became CEO and in 1962 he became chairman of the board, following the death of Dutch Kindelberger in 1962. In 1967, Atwood partnered with Willard Rockwell to form North American Rockwell. He was president and CEO of the new company.

Atwood retired in 1970 and held a position on the board until 1978. He died on March 5, 1999.

== Legacy ==
Under the leadership of Atwood, the North American Aviation and its employees won three Collier Trophy for their work on the supersonic fighter North American F-100 Super Sabre, the North American X-15 space plane, and the Rockwell B-1 Lancer bomber.

Among the many individual honors and awards given to Atwood, he had a presidential citation from Harry S. Truman for his contributions during World War II, the Air Force Association's Hap Arnold Trophy, and the Wright Brothers Memorial Trophy, awarded by the National Aeronautic Association. Atwood was elected to the International Air & Space Hall of Fame in 1984 and received the Howard Hughes Memorial Award in 1994.

In the HBO series From the Earth to the Moon, Atwood was portrayed by Ronny Cox. The Atwood Dorm at Harvey Mudd College in Claremont, California, was named after him. In 1984, he was inducted into the National Aviation Hall of Fame.

Atwood was on the cover of Newsweek magazine, December 21, 1964; the cover title was "Apollo and the Moon Men - North American's Lee Atwood."

In 1984, Atwood was inducted into the International Air & Space Hall of Fame at the San Diego Air & Space Museum.
