= James H. Kindelberger =

American businessman (1895–1962)

James Howard Kindelberger
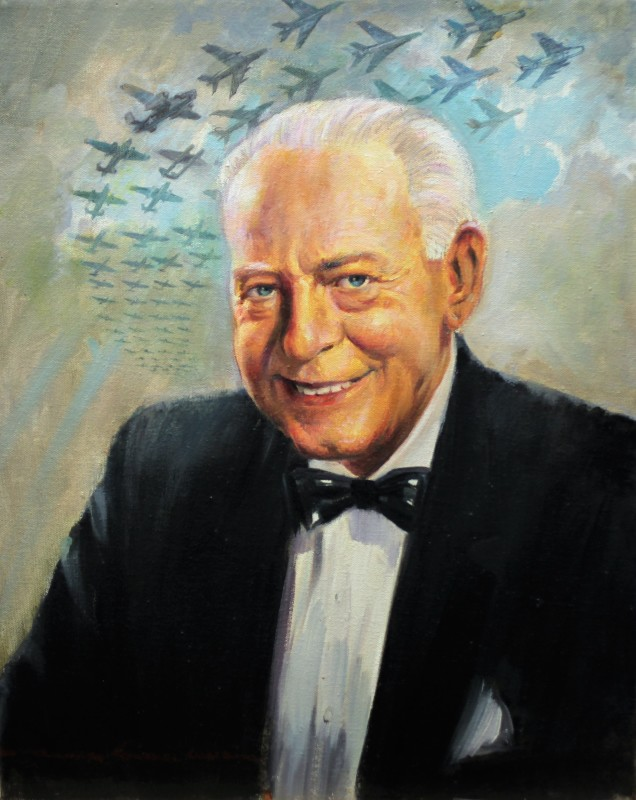
- Born: May 8, 1895; Wheeling, West Virginia, U.S.
- Died: July 27, 1962 (aged 67); Pacific Palisades, California, U.S.
- Other name: "Dutch"
- Known for: North American Aviation

James Howard "Dutch" Kindelberger (May 8, 1895 – July 27, 1962) was an American aviation pioneer. He led North American Aviation from 1934 until 1960. An extroverted character, Kindelberger was famed for his emphasis on hard work, orderliness and punctuality.

== Early life ==
Kindelberger was born on May 8, 1895, in Wheeling, West Virginia, to Charles Frederick Kindelberger, a steelworker and Rose Ann Kindelberger.

Kindelberger dropped out of school in the 10th grade and started working in the steel industry with his father. He took correspondence courses to further his education. In 1916, when he was 21 years old, he went to study at the Carnegie Institute of Technology to pursue engineering.

His nickname, 'Dutch' referred to his descent from German (Deutsch) immigrants from Nothweiler, Pfalz.

In 1919, he married Thelma Knarr and they had two children.

== Aviation career ==
During World War I, Kindelberger was a member of the US Army Air Service. He was a pilot instructor based at Park Field in Memphis, Tennessee. After the war, Kindelberger looked for work in aviation. In 1920, became chief draftsman and assistant chief engineer with the Glenn L. Martin Company in Cleveland, Ohio.

Kindelberger formed a lifelong working association with J. L. "Lee" Atwood when they met as young engineers at Douglas Aircraft Company in 1930, working on the DC-1 and DC-2 transports. Kindelberger worked as chief engineer and remained with Douglas for nine years.

The two left Douglas Aircraft in 1934, moving to North American Aviation. Atwood assumed the title of Chief Engineer, and Kindelberger was named president and General Manager. When they started at NAA, the company had orders for one passenger aircraft. Kindelberger managed to get a $1 million order for a military trainer, the North American BT-9.

=== World War II ===
In the summer of 1941, while United States was still not a participant in World War II, the British Air Ministry asked North American Aviation to build Curtiss P-40 Warhawk fighters for the Royal Air Force, since the total output of the Curtiss factory was earmarked for USA military use. Kindelberger told his UK contacts that North American could create a better design, and completed the prototype of the P-51 Mustang in four months.

In all, 42,000 aircraft were built by the company by the end of the war.

=== Post war ===
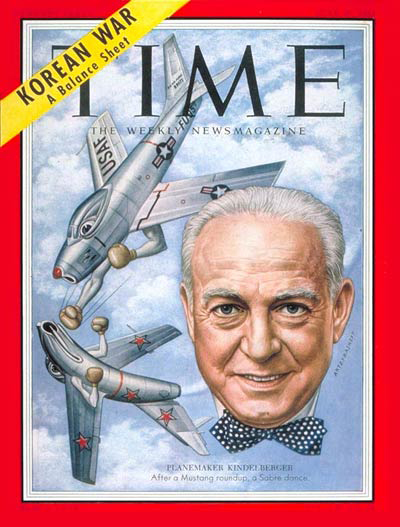
James H. Kindelberger on the cover of Time (June 29, 1953)

After World War II Atwood expected there would be a need for improved rocket engines based on those developed by the Germans for the V-2. The two decided in 1946 to invest $1 million in a rocket engine test facility in Santa Susana, California, and a supersonic wind tunnel at Los Angeles International Airport. This paid off when North American landed the contract to develop the Navaho, a rocket-boosted intercontinental cruise missile.

Kindelberger was promoted to chairman and chief executive officer in 1948, with Atwood replacing him as president.

The Navaho project allowed North American to develop expertise in rocket engines, inertial navigation systems, and supersonic aerodynamics. This in turn led to securing contracts for many advanced aerospace vehicles in the late 1950s – the X-15 crewed hypersonic spaceplane, the Hound Dog missile, and the XB-70 Valkyrie triple-sonic bomber. The XB-70 required the company to develop new materials, welding, and manufacturing processes.

== Later life ==
In 1960, Kindelberger retired and Atwood took over as Chief Executive. Kindelberger remained chairman of the board until his death on July 27, 1962, due to congestive heart failure at the age of 67. Dr. Toby Freedman was his personal doctor and medical director at NAA. Dr. Freedman was with Kindelberger when he died. He is buried at Westwood Village Memorial Park Cemetery in Los Angeles, California. Upon his death, Atwood became chairman of the board.

== Legacy ==
Under his guidance, North American Aviation broke technological barriers; produced propeller- and jet-powered fighters and bombers, military trainers, rocket engines, and rocket-powered aircraft; and began its role as the prime contractor for the country's space program. Between 1935 and 1967, North American Aviation (under Kindelberger's direction) built more military aircraft than any other airplane maker in U.S. history.

In 1972, he was inducted into the National Aviation Hall of Fame.

The International Aerospace Hall of Fame inducted Kindelberger in 1977.

Kindelberger was featured in a 2006 documentary by filmmaker William Winship, aired by PBS: Pioneers in Aviation: The Race to the Moon, which profiled five US aerospace pioneers:William Boeing, Donald Douglas, Dutch Kindelberger, Harrison Storms, and James McDonnell. The film included previously unreleased interviews, photos, and film footage of Kindelberger.
