= North American NAC-60 =

Proposed supersonic airliner design

NAC-60
- Side view of a North American NAC-60

General information
- Type: Supersonic transport
- National origin: United States
- Manufacturer: North American Aviation
- Status: Canceled in 1967

The North American NAC-60 was the first American supersonic transport (SST) project. The development took place in the 1960s as part of a government-funded design competition to build an American SST as the joint Anglo-French Concorde and the short-serviced Soviet Tupolev Tu-144 were underway. The design, however, due to being slower and smaller than the expectations of the American SST Race, was rejected in favor of the Lockheed and Boeing designs, allowing them to get further study.

== Design ==
In some respects, the NAC-60 was a scaled-up variant of North American's bomber prototype, the XB-70 Valkyrie. As with the B-70, the design of the NAC-60 did not include horizontal stabilizers at the tail structure but did retain the high-mounted canard above the cockpit area, and the box-like engine area under the fuselage. The use of high-lift devices on the leading edge of the wing lowered the landing angles to the point where the "drooping nose" was not required, and a more conventional rounded design was used. Compared to the other designs, the rounded nose profile and more cylindrical cross-section gave the NAC-60 a decidedly more conventional look than the other entries. This also meant it would fly slower, at Mach 2.65. Double delta wings were proposed.

Various passenger amenities were proposed which included polarized shades for passengers to control the amount of sunlight coming through their windows, an opportunity to be served a "deluxe" meal, and alcoholic beverages.

== Specifications (North American NAC-60) ==
Data from Flight International

General characteristics

- Crew: up to 4 flight crew
- Capacity: 187 passengers / 35,000 lb (15,876 kg) payload
- Length: 195 ft (59 m)
- Wingspan: 121 ft (37 m)
- Height: 48 ft (15 m)
- Max takeoff weight: 480,000 lb (217,724 kg)
- Powerplant: 4 × afterburning turbojet engines

Performance

- Maximum speed: 1,520 kn (1,750 mph, 2,820 km/h)
- Maximum speed: Mach 2.65
- Range: 3,389 nmi (3,900 mi, 6,276 km)
