= Marquardt MA-74 =

- Type: Ramjet
- National origin: United States
- Manufacturer: Marquardt Corporation
- Major applications: North American MQM-42

The Marquardt MA-74 was a ramjet engine built by the Marquardt Corporation for use in supersonic target drones in the 1960s.

== History ==
The MA-74 was developed by Marquardt for use as a powerplant for high-speed target drones; its primary use was in the North American Redhead and Roadrunner. A nacelle-type ramjet, it used a normal shock inlet, and was designed to be mounted on top of the aircraft; fuel was ordinary JP-4.

== Variants and applications ==
MA-74-ZAB
North American MQM-42

== Specifications (XPJ40-MD-2) ==
Data from Haggerty 1966

==== General characteristics ====
- Type: Ramjet
- Length: 90.7 inches (2,300 mm)
- Diameter: 16.5 inches (420 mm)
- Dry weight: 110 pounds (50 kg)

==== Components ====
- Compressor: None
- Fuel type: JP-4

==== Performance ====
- Maximum thrust: 1,790 lbf (8,000 N)
- Thrust-to-weight ratio: 16.3
