= North American MQM-42 =

American supersonic target drone

MQM-42 Redhead/Roadrunner
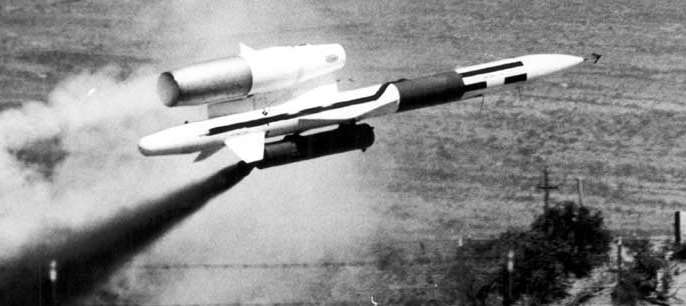
- Launch of a MQM-42

General information
- Type: Target drone
- National origin: United States
- Manufacturer: North American Aviation
- Primary user: United States Army

History
- First flight: 1961

The MQM-42 was a supersonic target drone developed by North American Aviation (from 1967 North American Rockwell). Developed in two subvariants, Redhead and Roadrunner, it was used by the United States Army in the 1960s and 1970s.

== Design and development ==
Given the company designation NA-273, the Redhead/Roadrunner drone program produced a small aircraft of largely conventional design, with small delta wings and a downswept tailplane; the vertical stabilizer doubled as a pylon for the aircraft's ramjet engine. A solid-propellant rocket provided thrust until the ramjet reached operating speed; launch was from the same launcher as that used by the MGR-3 Little John battlefield rocket. Two minor variants of the drone were produced; 'Redhead' was optimized for high-altitude flight, at heights of up to 60,000 feet (18,000 m), while 'Roadrunner' was a variant for low-altitude operation as low as 300 feet (91 m) above the ground, and both could reach speeds of between Mach 0.9 and Mach 2. An autopilot, set to maintain a preset altitude, provided control of the drone; radio command guidance from a ground control station could override the autopilot. At the end of a flight, if the target drone had not been shot down, recovery could be either on command from the ground station, or automatic in case of fuel exhaustion or loss of control; a retrorocket would decelerate the drone to allow for deployment of a recovery parachute.

== Operational history ==
First flight of the NA-273 took place in 1961; in 1963, the designation MQM-42A was applied to both variants. The MQM-42 was used primarily to provide training in tracking and engaging targets for the MIM-23 Hawk surface-to-air missile; it remained in service with the United States Army through the mid-1970s.

== Specifications (MQM-42A) ==
Data from Parsch 2007

General characteristics

- Crew: None
- Length: 24 ft 10 in (7.57 m)
- Wingspan: 6 ft 3 in (1.91 m)
- Gross weight: 900 lb (408 kg)
- Powerplant: 1 × Marquardt MA-74 ramjet, 1,790 lbf (8.0 kN) thrust
- Powerplant: 1 × Rocketdyne solid-fuel rocket booster, 6,000 lbf (27 kN) thrust

Performance

- Maximum speed: Mach 2+
- Range: 250 mi (400 km, 220 nmi)
- Service ceiling: 60,000 ft (18,000 m)

== See also ==
Aircraft of comparable role, configuration, and era

- Beechcraft MQM-107 Streaker
- Northrop AQM-35

Related lists

- List of unmanned aerial vehicles
