= North American Aviation =

American aerospace company (1928–1967)

- Industry: Aerospace
- Founded: 1928; 98 years ago
- Founders: Clement Melville Keys
- Defunct: March 1967
- Fate: Merger
- Successor: North American Rockwell
- Headquarters: Los Angeles, California, United States
- Key people: John Leland Atwood; James H. Kindelberger; Harold Raynor; Harrison Storms
- Parent: General Motors (1933–1948)
- Divisions: Atomics International; Autonetics; Rocketdyne

North American Aviation (NAA) was a major American aerospace manufacturer that designed and built several notable aircraft and spacecraft. Its products included the T-6 Texan trainer, the P-51 Mustang fighter, the B-25 Mitchell bomber, the F-86 Sabre jet fighter, the X-15 rocket plane, the XB-70 bomber, the B-1 Lancer, the Apollo command and service module, the second stage of the Saturn V rocket, and the Space Shuttle orbiter.

Through a series of mergers and sales, North American Aviation became part of North American Rockwell, which later became Rockwell International, and is now part of Boeing.

== History ==
=== Early years ===
On December 6, 1928, Clement Melville Keys founded North American as a holding company that bought and sold interests in various airlines and aviation-related companies. However, the Air Mail Act of 1934 forced the breakup of such holding companies. North American became a manufacturing company, run by James H. "Dutch" Kindelberger, who had been recruited from Douglas Aircraft Company. NAA did retain ownership of Eastern Air Lines until 1938.

In 1933, the General Motors Corporation purchased a controlling interest in NAA, and merged it with the General Aviation Manufacturing Corporation, but retained the name North American Aviation.

Kindelberger moved the company's operations from Dundalk, Maryland, to Los Angeles, California, which allowed flying year-round, and decided to focus on training aircraft, on the theory that it would be easier than trying to compete with established companies on larger projects. NAA's first planes were the GA-15 observation plane and the GA-16 trainer, followed by the O-47 and BT-9, also called the GA-16.

=== World War II ===
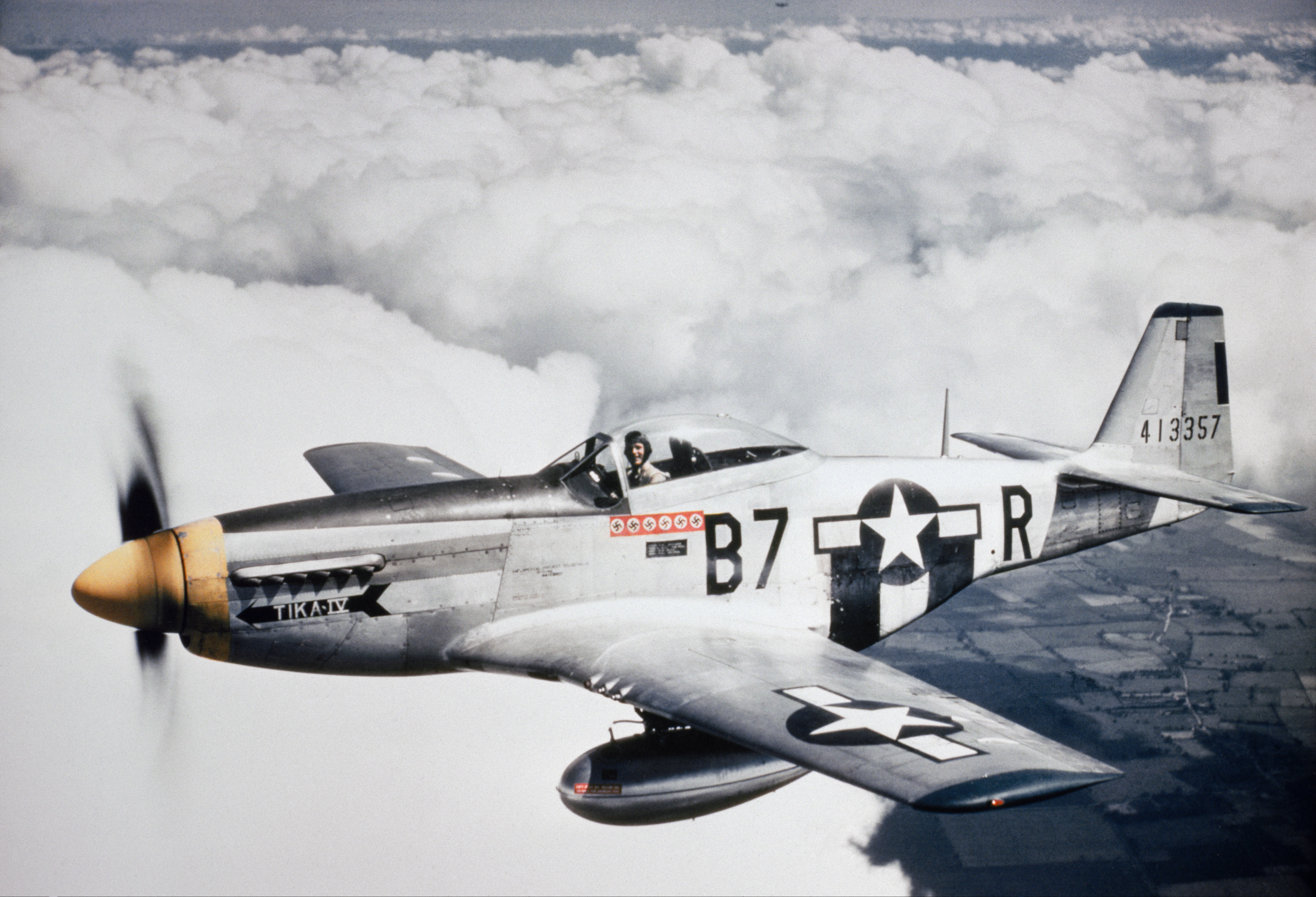
P-51D-5-NA Mustang

The BC-1 of 1937 was North American's first combat aircraft; it was based on the GA-16. In 1940, like other manufacturers, North American started gearing up for war, opening factories in Columbus, Ohio; Dallas, Texas; and Kansas City, Kansas. North American ranked eleventh among United States corporations in the value of wartime production contracts.

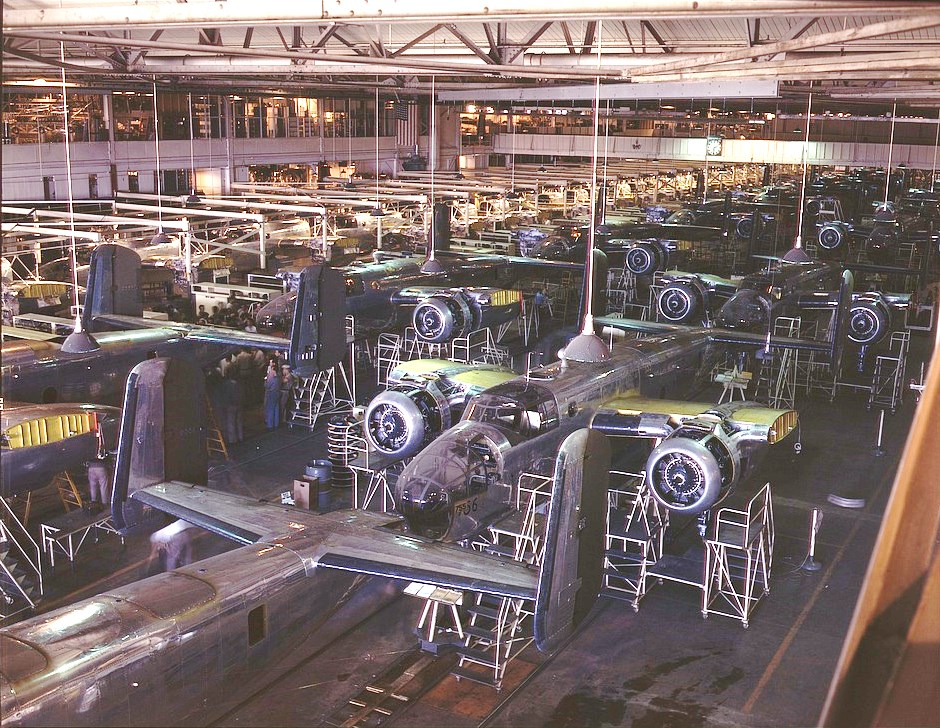
B-25 Mitchell bomber production line at the North American Aviation plant, Inglewood, California, October 1942. The plane's outer wings have yet to be added, which enables the two side-by-side assembly lines to be closer together. The outer wings will be attached outdoors, in the "sunshine" assembly line.

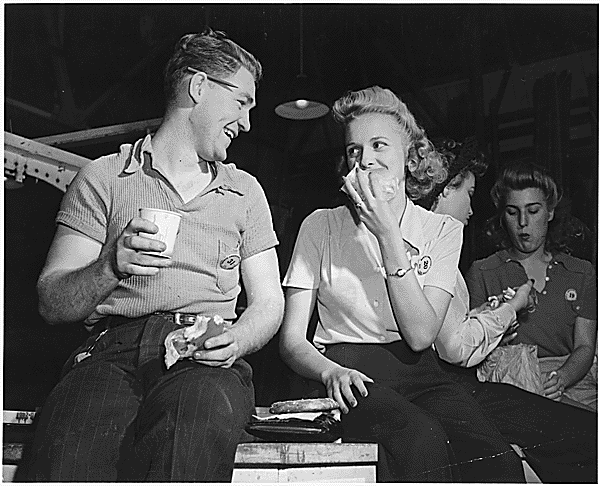
Aircraft workers on lunch break in Inglewood, 1942

North American's follow-on to the BT-9 was the T-6 Texan trainer, of which 17,000 were built, making it the most widely used trainer ever. The twin-engine B-25 Mitchell bomber achieved fame in the Doolittle Raid and was used in all combat theaters of operation. The P-51 Mustang was initially produced for Britain as an alternative to the Curtiss P-40 Warhawk, which North American had declined to produce under licence. The derivative A-36 Mustang was developed as a ground attack aircraft and dive bomber. This was done, in part, to keep the airframe in production as the US Army Air Corps had not yet decided to purchase the type as a fighter.

A suggestion by the RAF that North American switch the P-51's powerplant from its original Allison engine to the Rolls-Royce Merlin engine may have been one of the most significant events in World War II aviation, as it transformed the P-51 into what many consider to be the best American fighter of the war.

Labor troubles became a grave issue in 1941. During the 22 months from August 1939 to June 1941 Stalin and Hitler supported each other as war raged in Europe. In the U.S., Communist local union officials opposed American aid to Britain's war against Germany. They called strikes in war industries that were supplying Lend Lease to Britain. The United Auto Workers (UAW) won the election over the International Association of Machinists and represented all the employees at the North American factory in Inglewood, California. UAW negotiators demanded the starting pay be raised from 50 cents an hour to 75 cents, plus a 10 cents raise for the 11,000 current employees. The national union had made a no-strike pledge but suddenly a wildcat strike by the local on June 5 closed the plant that produced a fourth of the fighters. The UAW national leader Richard Frankensteen flew in but was unable to get the workers to return. So Washington intervened. With the approval of national CIO leadership, President Franklin Roosevelt on June 8 sent in the California national guard to reopen the plant with bayonets. Strikers were told to return immediately or be drafted into the US Army. They sullenly complied. However, when Germany suddenly invaded the USSR on June 22, the Communist activists suddenly became the strongest supporters of war production; they crushed wildcat strikes.

=== Post-war years ===
Post-war, North American's employment dropped from a high of 91,000 to 5,000 in 1946. On V-J Day, North American had orders from the U.S. government for 8,000 aircraft. A few months later, that had dropped to 24.

Two years later in 1948, General Motors divested NAA as a public company. Nevertheless, NAA continued with new designs, including the T-28 Trojan trainer and attack aircraft, the F-82 Twin Mustang fighter, B-45 Tornado jet bomber, the FJ Fury fighter, AJ Savage, the revolutionary XB-70 Valkyrie Mach-3 strategic bomber, Shrike Commander, and T-39 Sabreliner business jet.

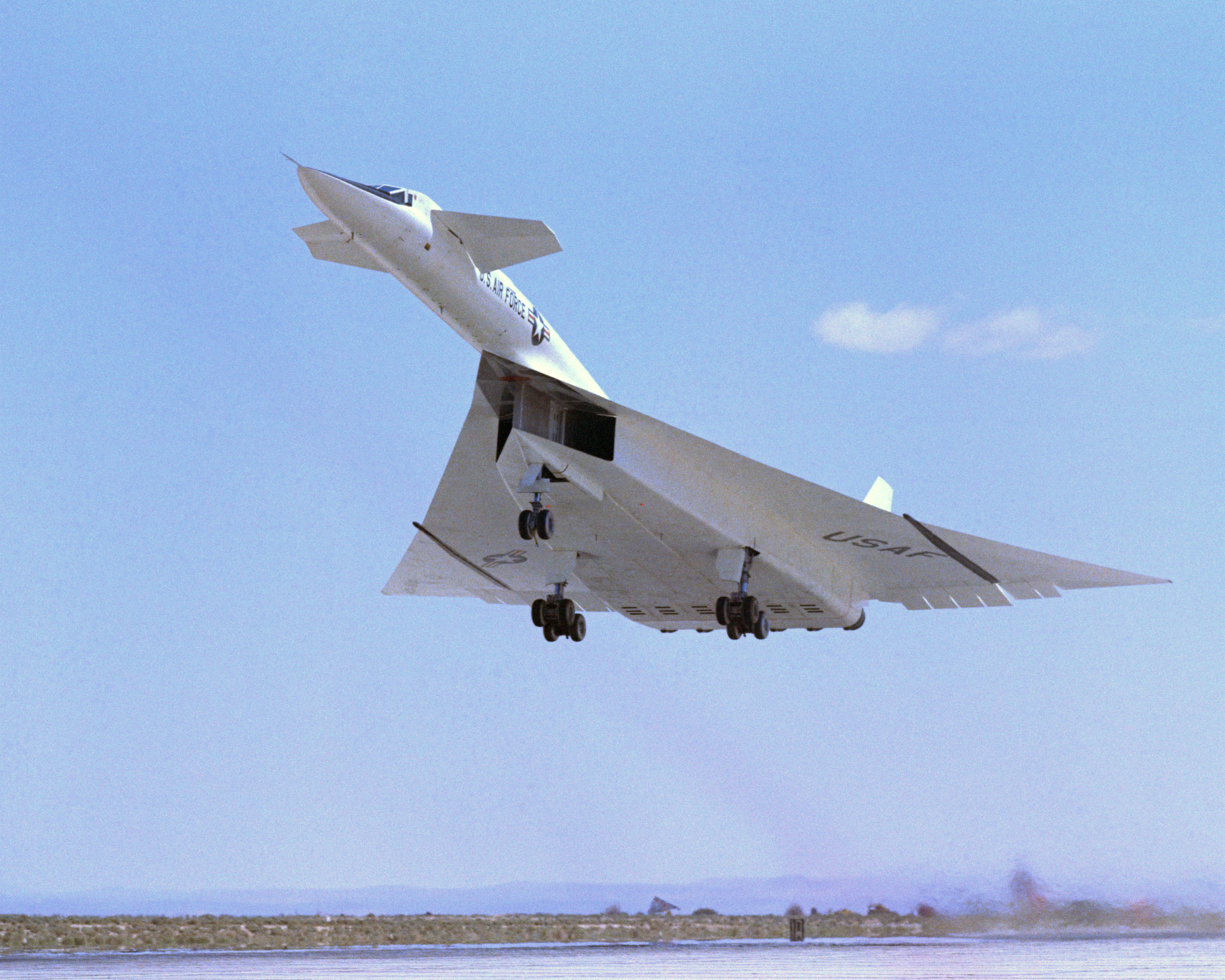
XB-70 Valkyrie

The Columbus, Ohio, division of North American Aviation was instrumental in the exclusive development and production of the A-5 Vigilante, an advanced high speed attack aircraft that saw significant use as a naval reconnaissance aircraft during the Vietnam War, the OV-10 Bronco, the first aircraft specifically designed for forward air control (FAC), and counter-insurgency (COIN) duties, and the T-2 Buckeye Naval trainer, which would serve from the late 1950s until 2008 and be flown in training by virtually every Naval Aviator and Naval Flight Officer in the US Navy and US Marine Corps for four decades. The Buckeye's name would be an acknowledgment to the state tree of Ohio, as well as the mascot of Ohio State University.

The North American F-86 Sabre started out as a redesigned Fury and achieved fame shooting down MiGs in the Korean War. Over 9,000 F-86s were produced. Its successor, the North American F-100 Super Sabre, was also popular.

Some 6,656 F-86s were produced in the United States, the most produced postwar military aircraft in the West, as well as another 2,500 elsewhere. To accommodate its Sabre production, North American opened facilities in a former Curtiss-Wright plant in Columbus, Ohio. It also moved into a former Consolidated-Vultee Aircraft plant at Downey, California, and in 1948, built a new plant at Downey. By the end of 1952, North American sales topped $315 million. Employment at the Columbus plant grew from 1,600 in 1950 to 18,000 in 1952.

The cancellation of the F-107 and F-108 programs in the late 1950s, as well as the cancellation of the Navaho intercontinental cruise missile program, was a blow to North American from which it never fully recovered.

=== Nuclear development ===
Atomics International was a division of North American Aviation which began as the Atomic Energy Research Department at the Downey plant in 1948. In 1955, the department was renamed Atomics International and engaged principally in the early development of nuclear technology and nuclear reactors for both commercial and government applications. Atomics International was responsible for a number of accomplishments relating to nuclear energy: design, construction and operation of the first nuclear reactor in California (a small aqueous homogeneous reactor located at the NAA Downey plant), the first nuclear reactor to produce power for a commercial power grid in the United States (the Sodium Reactor Experiment located at the Santa Susana Field Laboratory) and the first nuclear reactor launched into outer space (the SNAP-10A). As overall interest in nuclear power declined, Atomics International transitioned to non-nuclear energy-related projects such as coal gasification and gradually ceased designing and testing nuclear reactors. Atomics International was eventually merged with the Rocketdyne division in 1978.

=== Navigation and guidance, radar, and data systems ===
Autonetics began in 1945 at North American's Technical Research Laboratory, a small unit in the Los Angeles Division's engineering department based in Downey, California. The evolution of the Navaho missile program resulted in the establishment of Autonetics as a separate division of North American Aviation in 1955, first located in Downey, later moving to Anaheim, California in 1963. The division was involved in the development of guidance systems for the Minuteman ballistic missile system.

=== Space program ===
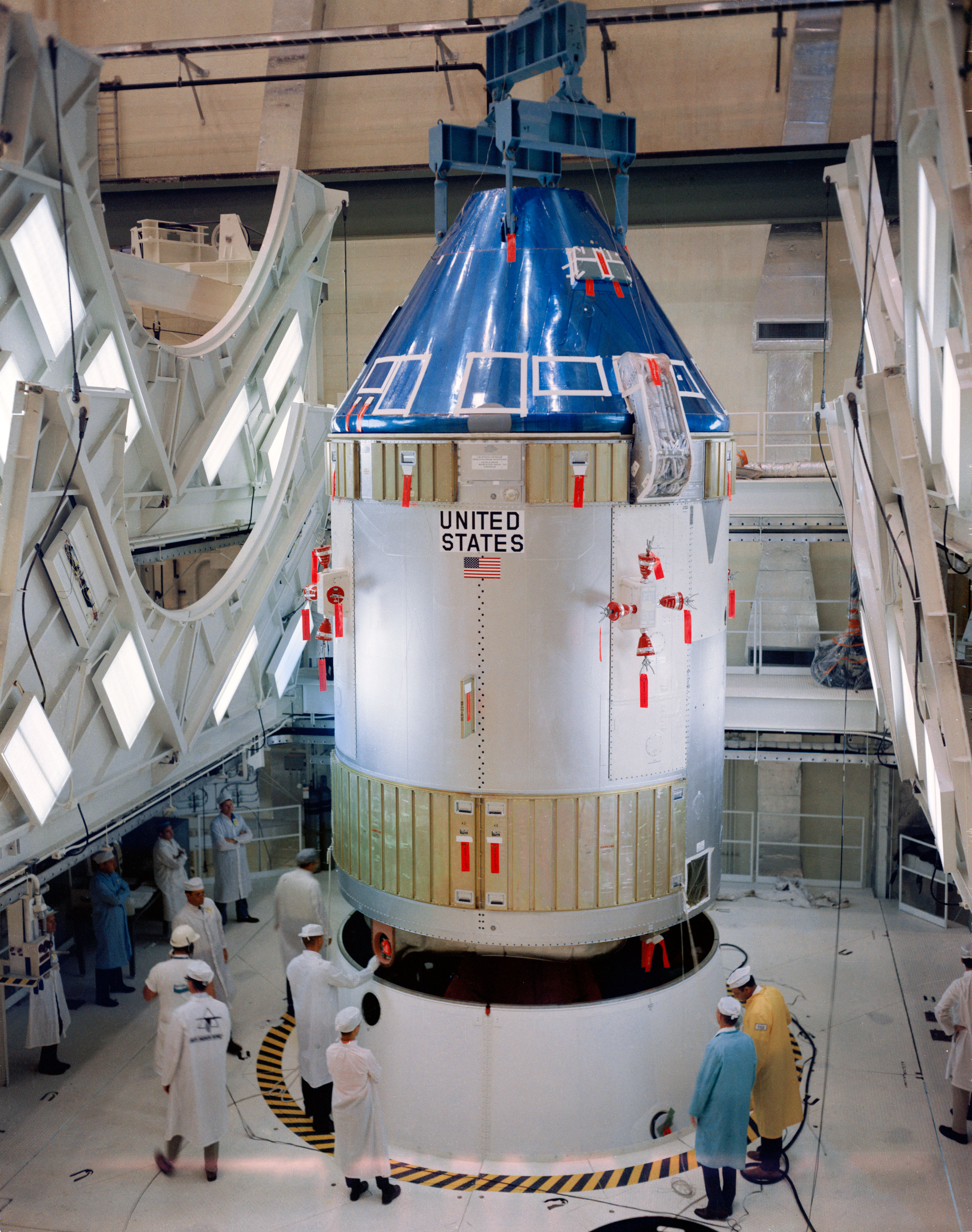
Apollo spacecraft being prepared for the Apollo 7 mission

In 1955, the rocket engine operations were spun off into a separate division as Rocketdyne. This division furnished engines for the Redstone, Jupiter, Thor, Delta, and Atlas missiles, and for NASA's Saturn family of launch vehicles.

North American designed and built the airframe for the X-15, a rocket-powered aircraft that first flew in 1959.

In 1959, North American built the first of several Little Joe boosters used to test the launch escape system for the Project Mercury spacecraft. In 1960, the new CEO Lee Atwood decided to focus on the space program, and the company became the prime contractor for the Apollo command and service module, a larger Little Joe II rocket to test Apollo's launch escape system, and the S-II second stage of the Saturn V.

=== Merger and acquisition ===
The fatal Apollo 1 fire in January 1967 was initially blamed on the company in the press, although a congressional hearing later ruled otherwise. In September, it merged with Rockwell-Standard, and the merged company became known as North American Rockwell. The company continued its involvement with the Apollo program, building the Command and Service modules for all 11 missions. Within two years, the new company also was studying concepts for the Space Shuttle, and won the orbiter contract in July 1972. In February 1973, the company changed its name again to Rockwell International, and named its aircraft division North American Aircraft Operations.

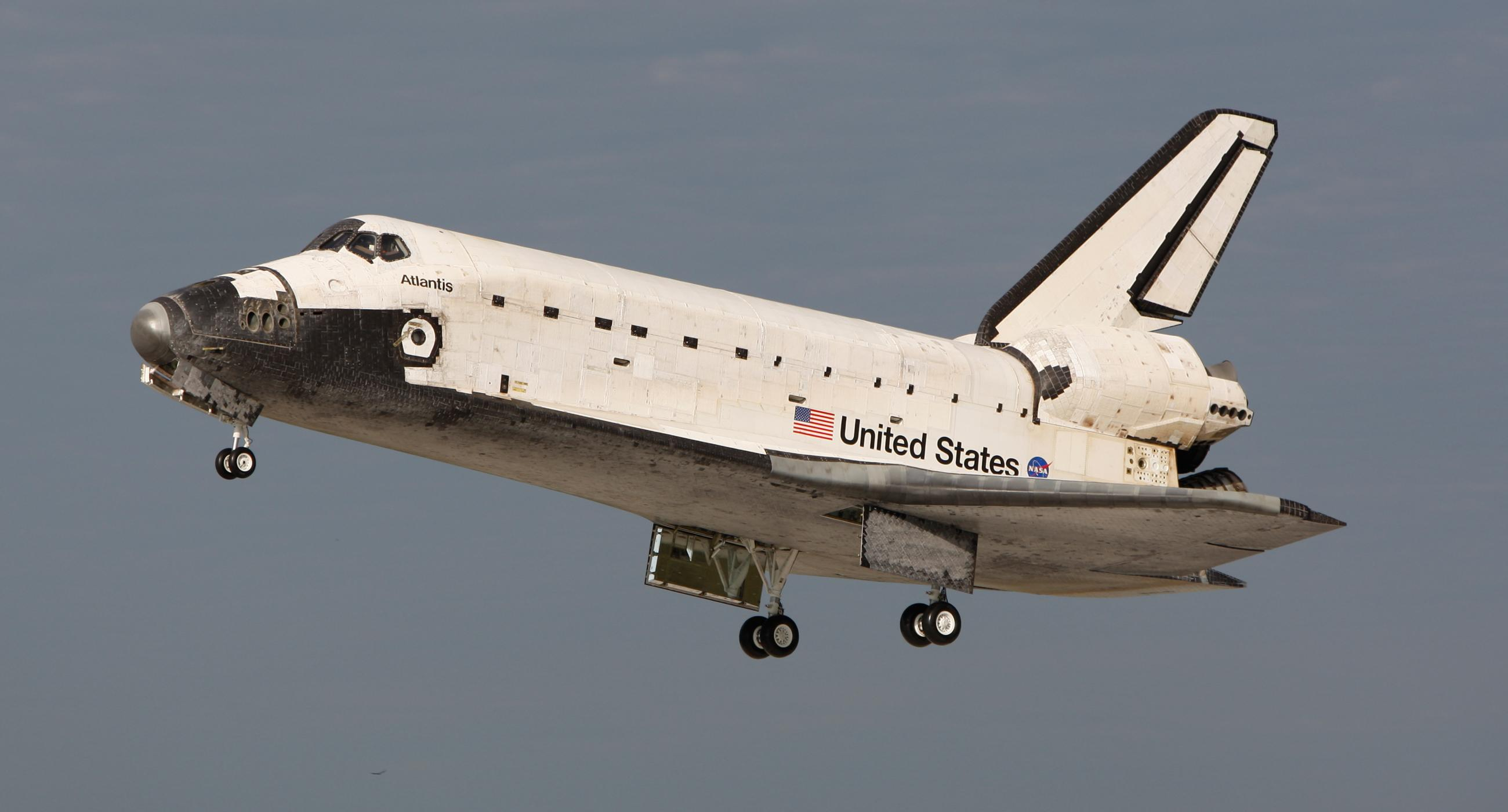
Space Shuttle orbiter Atlantis landing at Kennedy Space Center

Rockwell International's defense and space divisions (including the North American Aviation divisions Autonetics and Rocketdyne) were sold to Boeing in December 1996. Initially called Boeing North American, these groups were integrated with Boeing's Defense division. Rocketdyne was eventually sold by Boeing to UTC Pratt & Whitney in 2005. UTC later sold Rocketdyne to Aerojet (GenCorp) in 2013.

== Products ==
=== Aircraft ===
Model name	First flight	Number built	Type
North American NA-16	1935	1,935	Single piston engine trainer
North American O-47	1935	239	Single piston engine observation airplane
North American BT-9	1936	149	Single piston engine trainer
North American XB-21	1936	1	Prototype twin piston engine medium bomber
North American BC-1	1937	270	Single piston engine trainer
North American Harvard	1938	1,463	Single piston engine trainer
North American BT-14	1939	251	Single piston engine trainer
North American T-6 Texan	1939	15,495	Single piston engine trainer
North American SNJ	1939	3,867	Single piston engine trainer
North American P-64	1939/1940	13	Single piston engine fighter
North American NA-35	1940	1	Prototype single piston engine trainer
North American NA-64 Yale	1940	230	Single piston engine trainer
North American A-27	1940	10	Single piston engine attack airplane
North American B-25 Mitchell	1940	9,890	Twin piston engine medium bomber
North American P-51 Mustang	1940	15,000+	Single piston engine fighter
North American XB-28	1942	2	Prototype twin piston engine medium bomber
North American A-36	1942	500	Single piston engine attack airplane
North American F-82 Twin Mustang	1945	272	Twin piston engine escort fighter
North American Navion	1946	1,109 (Note: This includes 83 aircraft built for the military as L-17s.)	Single piston engine civilian airplane
North American FJ-1 Fury	1946	33	Single jet engine naval fighter
North American XSN2J	1947	2	Prototype single piston engine trainer
North American B-45 Tornado	1947	143	Quad jet engine bomber
North American F-86 Sabre	1947	9,860	Single jet engine fighter
North American AJ Savage	1948	143	Twin piston engine naval attack airplane
North American T-28 Trojan	1949	1,948	Single piston engine trainer
North American F-86D Sabre	1949	2,847	Single jet engine interceptor fighter
North American YF-93	1950	2	Prototype single jet engine fighter
North American FJ-2 Fury	1951	203	Single jet engine naval fighter
North American XA2J Super Savage	1952	1	Prototype twin turboprop engine naval attack airplane
North American F-100 Super Sabre	1953	2,294	Single jet engine fighter
North American FJ-3 Fury	1953	538	Single jet engine naval fighter
North American X-10	1953	13	Experimental twin jet engine uncrewed airplane
North American FJ-4 Fury	1954	374	Single jet engine naval fighter
North American F-107	1956	3	Prototype single jet engine fighter
North American T-2 Buckeye	1958	529	Twin jet engine trainer
North American A-5 Vigilante	1958	167	Twin jet engine naval attack airplane
North American Sabreliner	1958	800+	Twin jet engine business airplane
North American X-15	1959	3	Experimental single rocket engine aircraft
North American XB-70 Valkyrie	1964	2	Prototype six jet engine strategic bomber
North American Rockwell OV-10 Bronco	1965	360	Twin turboprop engine observation airplane

=== Crewed spacecraft ===
- Apollo command and service module
- North American DC-3
- Skylab Rescue
- Space Shuttle orbiter

=== Missiles and rockets ===
- AGM-28 Hound Dog
- AGM-64 Hornet
- RTV-A-3 NATIV
- SM-64 Navaho
- S-II second stage of the Saturn V launch vehicle
- Little Joe (rocket)
- Little Joe II

=== Unmanned aerial vehicles ===
- North American MQM-42 Redhead-Roadrunner

=== Projects ===
- North American NA-116 (four-engined long range bomber project only)
- North American NA-148 (commercial transport project only)
- North American NA-237 (fighter bomber project only)
- North American NA-323 (project only for VFX F-14 program)
- North American NA-365 (carrier on board delivery - project only)
- North American NA-400 (naval strike attack project for USN)
- North American NA-420 (V/STOL Support aircraft project for USN)
- North American NAC-60
- North American XF-108 Rapier

== See also ==
- Norris J. Nelson, Los Angeles City Council member, commenting on 1941 North American strike
