= North American XB-70 Valkyrie =

Prototype supersonic strategic bomber

XB-70 Valkyrie
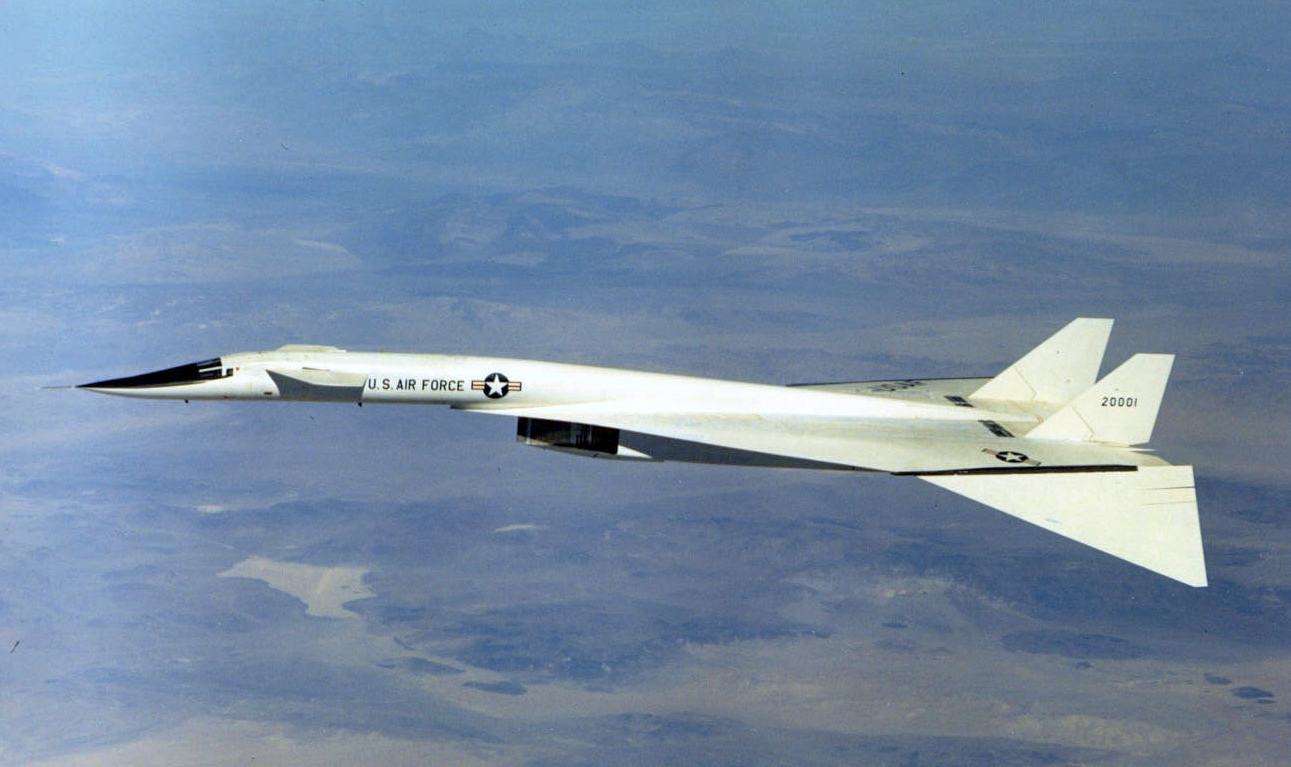
- XB-70 Valkyrie in flight

General information
- Type: Strategic bomber Supersonic research aircraft
- National origin: United States
- Manufacturer: North American Aviation (NAA)
- Designer: Harrison "Stormy" Storms
- Status: Retired
- Primary users: United States Air Force NASA
- Number built: 2

History
- First flight: 21 September 1964
- Retired: 4 February 1969
- Fate: 1 preserved in museum

The North American Aviation XB-70 Valkyrie is a retired prototype version of the planned B-70 nuclear-armed, deep-penetration supersonic strategic bomber for the United States Air Force Strategic Air Command. Designed by North American Aviation in the late 1950s, the Valkyrie was a large six-engine, delta-winged aircraft able to fly Mach 3+ at an altitude of 70,000 feet (21,000 metres).

At these speeds, it was expected that the B-70 would be practically immune to interceptor aircraft, the only effective weapon against bomber aircraft at the time. The bomber would spend only a brief time over a particular radar station, flying out of its range before the controllers could position their fighters in a suitable location for an interception. Its high speed made the aircraft difficult to see on radar displays and its high-altitude and high-speed capabilities could not be matched by any contemporaneous Soviet interceptor or fighter aircraft.

The introduction of the first Soviet surface-to-air missiles in the late 1950s put the idea of the B-70 being near-invulnerable in doubt. In response, the US Air Force (USAF) began flying its missions at low level, where the missile radar's line of sight was limited by terrain. In this low-level penetration role, the B-70 offered little additional performance over the B-52 it was meant to replace, while being far more expensive with shorter range. Alternative missions were proposed, but these were of limited scope. With the advent of intercontinental ballistic missiles (ICBMs) during the late 1950s, crewed nuclear bombers were increasingly seen as obsolete.

The USAF eventually gave up fighting for its production and the B-70 program was cancelled in 1961. Development was then turned over to a research program to study the effects of long-duration high-speed flight. As a result, two prototype aircraft, designated XB-70A, were built; these aircraft were used for supersonic test-flights from 1964 to 1969. In 1966, the second, more advanced prototype crashed after colliding with an F-104 Starfighter while flying in close formation for a photo shoot; the only remaining Valkyrie bomber is in the National Museum of the United States Air Force near Dayton, Ohio.

== Development ==
=== Background ===
In an offshoot of Boeing's MX-2145 crewed boost-glide bomber project, Boeing hired RAND Corporation in January 1954 to explore what sort of bomber aircraft would be needed to deliver the various nuclear weapons under development. At the time, nuclear weapons weighed several tons, and the need to carry enough fuel to fly that payload from the continental United States to the Soviet Union demanded large bombers. Boeing and RAND also concluded that the aircraft would need supersonic speed to escape the blast of its bombs.

The aviation industry had been studying this problem for some time. From the mid-1940s, there was interest in using nuclear-powered aircraft as bombers. (Note: Quote by Theodore von Kármán (1945): "The size and performance of the craft driven by atomic power would depend mainly on ... reducing the engine weight to the limiting value which makes flight at a certain speed possible.") In a conventional jet engine, thrust is provided by heating air using jet fuel and accelerating it out a nozzle. In a nuclear engine, heat is supplied by a reactor, whose consumables last for months instead of hours. Most designs also carried a small amount of jet fuel for high-power portions of flight, such as takeoffs and high-speed dashes.

Another possibility being explored at the time was the use of boron-enriched "zip fuels", which increase the energy density of jet fuel by about 40 percent, and could be used in modified versions of existing jet engine designs. Zip fuels appeared to offer sufficient performance improvement to produce a strategic bomber with supersonic speed.

=== WS-110A ===
The Air Force followed these developments closely, and in 1955 issued General Operational Requirement No. 38 for a new bomber, combining the payload and intercontinental range of the B-52 with the Mach 2 top speed of the Convair B-58 Hustler. (Note: The NB-58 Hustler was used for XB-70 engine testing, and the TB-58 was used for XB-70 chase and training.) The new bomber was expected to enter service in 1963. Nuclear and conventional designs were considered. The nuclear-powered bomber was organized as "Weapon System 125A" and pursued simultaneously with the jet-powered version, "Weapon System 110A".

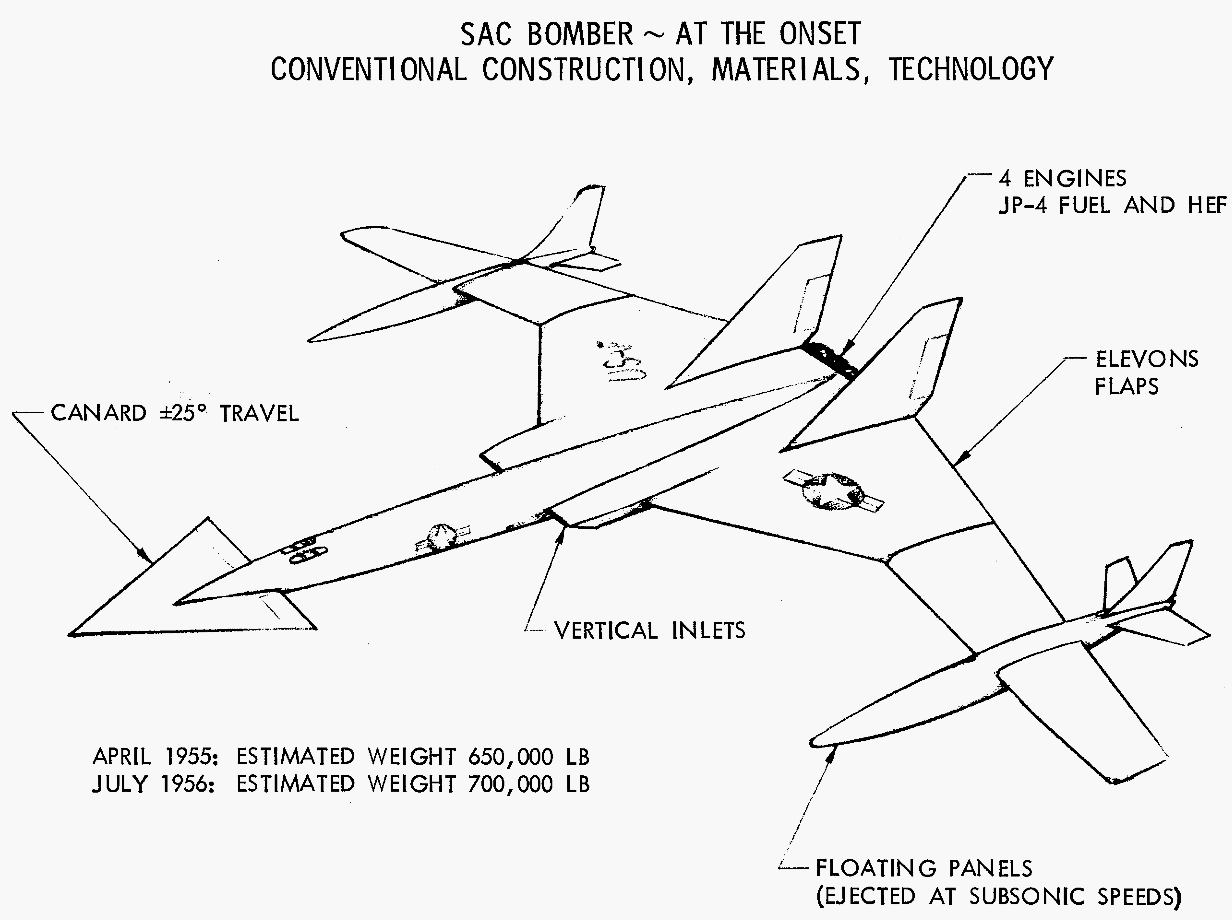
NAA's original proposal for WS-110A. The "floating panels" are large fuel tanks the size of a B-47. Boeing's design was almost identical, differing largely in having a single vertical stabilizer and having two of its engines in pods at the outer edges of the inner wing section.

The USAF Air Research and Development Command's (ARDC) requirement for WS-110A asked for a chemical-fuel bomber with Mach 0.9 cruising speed and "maximum possible" speed during a 1,000-nautical-mile (1,200 mi; 1,900 km) entrance and exit from the target. The requirement also called for a 50,000-pound (23,000 kg) payload and a combat radius of 4,000 nautical miles (4,600 mi; 7,400 km). The Air Force formed similar requirements for a WS-110L intercontinental reconnaissance system in 1955, but this was later canceled in 1958 due to better options. In July 1955, six contractors were selected to bid on WS-110A studies. Boeing and North American Aviation submitted proposals, and on 8 November 1955 were awarded contracts for Phase 1 development.

In mid-1956, initial designs were presented by the two companies. Zip fuel was to be used in the afterburners to improve range by 10 to 15 percent over conventional fuel. Both designs had huge wing-tip fuel tanks that could be jettisoned when their fuel was depleted before a supersonic dash to the target. The tanks also included the outer portions of the wing, which would also be jettisoned to produce a smaller wing suitable for supersonic speeds. Both became trapezoidal wings after ejection, at that time the highest performance planform known. They also featured flush cockpits to maintain the highest fineness ratio possible despite its negative effects on visibility.

The two designs had takeoff weights of about 750,000 pounds (340,000 kg) with large fuel loads. The Air Force evaluated the designs, and in September 1956 deemed them too large and complicated for operations. General Curtis LeMay was dismissive, declaiming, "This is not an airplane, it's a three-ship formation." The USAF ended Phase 1 development in October 1956 and instructed the two contractors to continue design studies.

=== New designs ===
While the original proposals were being studied, advances in supersonic flight were proceeding rapidly. The narrow delta was establishing itself as a preferred planform for supersonic flight, replacing earlier designs like the swept-wing and trapezoidal layouts seen on designs like the Lockheed F-104 Starfighter and the earlier WS-110 concepts. Engines able to cope with higher temperatures were also under development, allowing for sustained supersonic speeds.

This work led to an interesting discovery: when an engine was optimized specifically for high speed, it burned perhaps twice as much fuel at that speed than when it was running at subsonic speeds. However, the aircraft would be flying as much as four times as fast. Thus its most economical cruise speed, in terms of fuel per mile, was its maximum speed. This was entirely unexpected and implied that there was no point in the dash concept; if the aircraft was able to reach Mach 3, it may as well fly its entire mission at that speed. The question remained whether such a concept was technically feasible, but by March 1957, engine development and wind tunnel testing had progressed enough to suggest that it was.

WS-110 was redesigned to fly at Mach 3 for the entire mission. Zip fuel was retained for the engine's afterburner to increase range. Both North American and Boeing returned new designs with very long fuselages and large delta wings. They differed primarily in engine layout; the NAA design arranged its six engines in a semi-circular duct under the rear fuselage, while the Boeing design used separate podded engines located individually on pylons below the wing, like the Hustler.

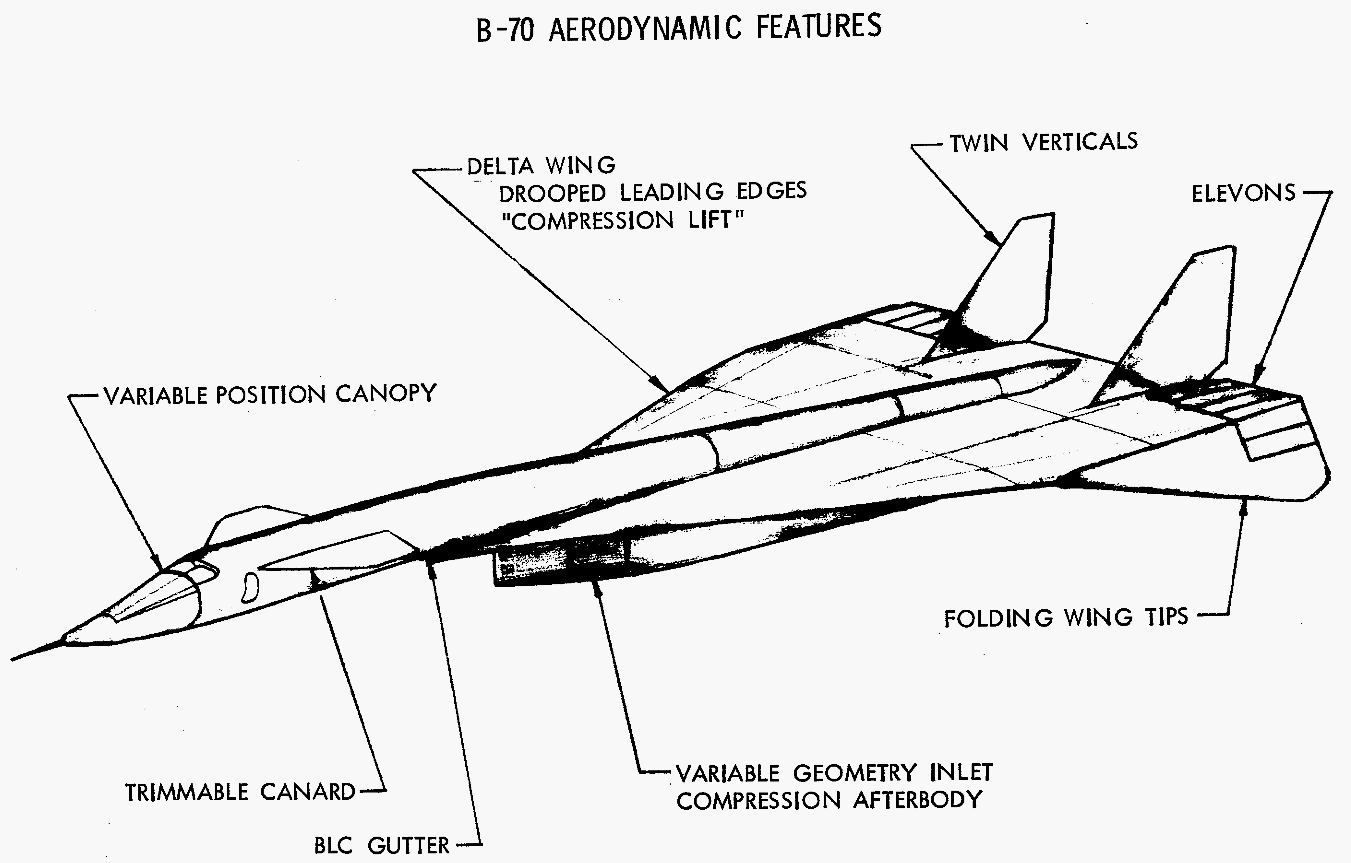
NAA's final WS-110A proposal, built as the XB-70

North American scoured available literature to find any additional advantage. This led them to an obscure report by two NACA wind tunnel experts, who wrote a report in 1956 titled "Aircraft Configurations Developing High Lift-Drag Ratios at High Supersonic Speeds". Known today as compression lift, the idea was to use the shock wave generated off the nose or other sharp points on the aircraft as a source of high-pressure air. By carefully positioning the wing in relation to the shock, the shock's high pressure could be captured on the bottom of the wing and generate additional lift. To take maximum advantage of this effect, they redesigned the underside of the aircraft to feature a large triangular intake area far forward of the engines, better positioning the shock in relation to the wing. The six individually-podded engines were repositioned, three in each of two separate ducts, under the fuselage.

North American improved on the basic concept by adding a set of drooping wing-tip panels that were lowered at high speed. This helped trap the shock wave under the wing between the downturned wing tips. It also added more vertical surface to the aircraft to maintain directional stability at high speeds. NAA's solution had an additional advantage, as it decreased the surface area of the rear of the wing when the panels were moved into their high-speed position. This helped offset the natural rearward shift of the center of pressure, or "average lift point", with increasing speeds. Under normal conditions this caused an increasing nose-down trim, which had to be offset by moving the control surfaces, increasing drag. When the wing tips were drooped, the lifting area of the wings was lessened, moving the lift forward and reducing trim drag.

The buildup of heat due to skin friction during sustained supersonic flight had to be addressed. During a Mach 3 cruise, the aircraft would reach an average of 450 °F (230 °C), with leading edges reaching 630 °F (330 °C), and up to 1,000 °F (540 °C) in engine compartments. NAA proposed building their design out of sandwich panels, with each panel consisting of two thin sheets of stainless steel brazed to opposite faces of a honeycomb-shaped foil core. Expensive titanium would be used only in high-temperature areas like the leading edge of the horizontal stabilizer, and the nose. To cool the interior, the XB-70 pumped fuel en route to the engines through heat exchangers.

On 30 August 1957, the Air Force decided that enough data were available on the NAA and Boeing designs that a competition could begin. On 18 September, the Air Force issued operational requirements that called for a cruising speed of Mach 3.0 to 3.2, an over-target altitude of 70,000–75,000 ft (21,000–23,000 m), a range of up to 10,500 miles (16,900 km), and a gross weight not to exceed 490,000 pounds (220,000 kg). The aircraft would have to use the hangars, runways and handling procedures used by the B-52. On 23 December 1957, the North American proposal was declared the winner of the competition, and on 24 January 1958, a contract was issued for Phase 1 development.

In February 1958, the proposed bomber was designated B-70, with the prototypes receiving the "X" experimental prototype designation. The name "Valkyrie" was the winning submission in early 1958, selected from 20,000 entries in a USAF "Name the B-70" contest. The Air Force approved an 18-month program acceleration in March 1958 that rescheduled the first flight to December 1961. But in late 1958 the service announced that this acceleration would not be possible due to lack of funding. In December 1958, a Phase II contract was issued. The mockup of the B-70 was reviewed by the Air Force in March 1959. Provisions for air-to-surface missiles and external fuel tanks were requested afterward. At the same time, North American was developing the F-108 supersonic interceptor. To reduce program costs, the F-108 would share two of the engines, the escape capsule, and some smaller systems with the B-70. In early 1960, North American and the USAF released the first drawing of the XB-70 to the public.

=== The "missile problem" ===
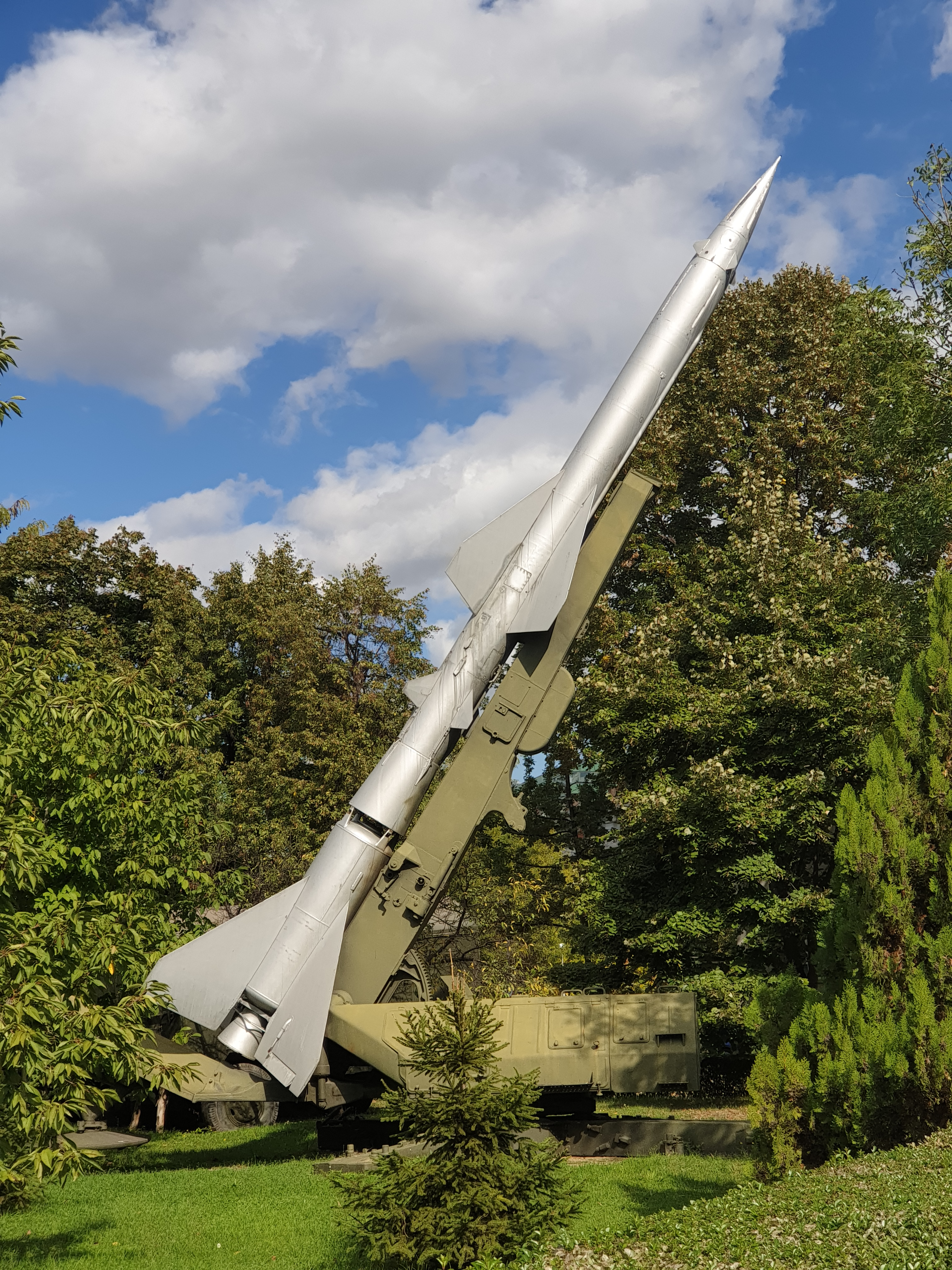
The introduction of the S-75 in the late 1950s led to great changes in USAF attack profiles. These suggested the high-and-fast approach would no longer work, and greatly reduced the value of the B-70 concept.

The B-70 was designed to use a high-speed, high-altitude bombing approach that followed a trend of bombers flying progressively faster and higher since the start of crewed bomber use. Through that same period, only two weapons proved effective against bombers: fighter aircraft and anti-aircraft artillery (AAA). Flying higher and faster made it more difficult for both; higher speeds allowed the bomber to fly out of range of the weapons more quickly, while higher altitudes increased the time needed for fighters to climb to the bombers, and greatly increased the size of the AAA weapons needed to reach those altitudes.

As early as 1942, German flak commanders had already concluded that AAA would be essentially useless against jet aircraft, and began development of guided missiles to fill this role. Most forces reached the same conclusion soon afterwards, with both the US and UK starting missile development programs before the war ended. The UK's Green Mace was one of the last attempts to develop a useful high-altitude AAA weapon, but its development ended in 1957.

Interceptor aircraft with ever-improving performance remained the only effective anti-bomber weapons by the early 1950s, and even these were having problems keeping up with the latest designs; Soviet interceptors during the late 1950s could not intercept the high-altitude U-2 reconnaissance aircraft, despite its relatively low speeds. It was later discovered that flying faster also made radar detection much more difficult due to an effect known as the blip-to-scan ratio, and any reduction in tracking efficiency would further interfere with the operation and guidance of fighters.

The introduction of the first effective anti-aircraft missiles by the late 1950s changed this picture dramatically. Missiles could stand ready for immediate launch, eliminating operational delays like the time needed to get the pilot into the cockpit of a fighter. Guidance did not require wide-area tracking or calculation of an intercept course: a simple comparison of the time needed to fly to the altitude of the target returned the required deflection. Missiles also had greater altitude capability than any aircraft and improving this to adapt to new aircraft was a low-cost development path. The US was aware of Soviet work in the field, and had reduced the expected operational lifetime of the U-2, knowing that it would become vulnerable to these missiles as they were improved. In 1960, a U-2 flown by Gary Powers was shot down by one of the earliest Soviet guided air-defence missiles, the S-75 Dvina, known in the west as the SA-2 Guideline.

Faced with this problem, military doctrine had already started shifting away from high-altitude supersonic bombing toward low-altitude penetration. Radar is line-of-sight, so aircraft could dramatically shorten detection distances by flying close to the Earth and hiding behind terrain. Missile sites spaced to overlap in range when attacking bombers at high altitudes would leave large gaps between their coverage for bombers flying at lower levels. With an appropriate map of the missile sites, the bombers could fly between and around the defenses. Additionally, early missiles generally flew unguided for a period of time before the radar systems were able to track the missile and start sending it guidance signals. With the SA-2 missile, this minimum altitude was roughly 2,000 feet (600 m).

Flying at low level provided protection against fighters as well. Radars of the era did not have the ability to look down (see look-down/shoot-down); if a higher altitude aircraft's radar was aimed down to detect targets at a lower altitude, the reflection of the ground would overwhelm the signal returned from a target. An interceptor flying at normal altitudes would be effectively blind to bombers far below it. The interceptor could descend to lower altitudes to increase the amount of visible sky, but doing so would limit its radar range in the same way as the missile sites, as well as greatly increasing fuel use and thus reducing mission time. The Soviet Union would not introduce an interceptor with look-down capability until 1972 with the High Lark radar in the MiG-23M, and even this model had very limited capability.

Strategic Air Command found itself in an uncomfortable position; bombers had been tuned for efficiency at high speeds and altitudes, performance that had been purchased at great cost in both engineering and financial terms. SAC had introduced the B-58 Hustler to replace the Boeing B-47 Stratojet in the medium-range role with the general goal being similar to the B-70's intended replacement of the B-52. The Hustler had been expensive to develop and purchase, and required enormous amounts of fuel and maintenance in comparison to the B-47. It was estimated that it cost three times as much to operate as the much larger and longer-ranged B-52.

The B-70, designed for even higher speeds, altitudes and range than the B-58, suffered even more in relative terms. At high altitudes, the B-70 was as much as four times as fast as the B-52, but at low altitudes it was limited to only Mach 0.95, only modestly faster than the B-52's Mach 0.85 at the same altitudes. It also had a smaller bomb load and shorter range. Its only major advantage would be its ability to use its high speed in areas without missile cover, especially on the long journey from the US to USSR. The value was limited; the USAF's doctrine stressed that the primary reason for maintaining the bomber force in an era of ICBMs was that the bombers could remain in the air at long ranges from their bases and were thus immune to sneak attack. In this case, the higher speed would be used for only a short period of time between the staging areas and the Soviet coastline.

Adding to the problems, the zip fuel program was canceled in 1959. After burning, the fuel turned into caustic and abrasive liquids and solids that increased wear on moving turbine engine components and were toxic, making servicing difficult. (Note: Quote: "deleterious to metallic components".) Although the B-70 was intended to use zip only in the afterburners, and thus avoid this problem, the enormous cost of the zip program for such limited gains led to its cancellation. This by itself was not a fatal problem as newly developed high-energy fuels like JP-6 were available to make up some of the difference. Most of the range lost in the change from zip fuel was restored by filling one of the two bomb bays with a fuel tank. Another problem arose when the XF-108 program was canceled in September 1959, which ended the shared development that benefited the B-70 program.

=== Downsizing, upswing, cancellation ===
At two secret meetings on 16 and 18 November 1959, the Chairman of the Joint Chiefs of Staff, Air Force General Nathan Twining, recommended the Air Force's plan for the B-70 to reconnoiter and strike rail-mobile Soviet ICBMs, but the Chief of Staff of the Air Force, General Thomas White, admitted the Soviets would "be able to hit the B-70 with rockets" and requested the B-70 be downgraded to "a bare minimum research and development program" at $200 million for fiscal year 1960 (equivalent to $2.2 billion today). President Eisenhower responded that the reconnaissance and strike mission was "crazy" since the nuclear mission was to attack known production and military complexes, and emphasized that he saw no need for the B-70 since the ICBM is "a cheaper, more effective way of doing the same thing". Eisenhower also identified that the B-70 would not be in manufacturing until "eight to ten years from now" and "said he thought we were talking about bows and arrows at a time of gunpowder when we spoke of bombers in the missile age". In December 1959 the Air Force announced the B-70 project would be cut to a single prototype, and most of the planned B-70 subsystems would no longer be developed.

Interest then increased due to the politics of presidential campaign of 1960. A central plank of John F. Kennedy's campaign was that Eisenhower and the Republicans were weak on defense, and pointed to the B-70 as an example. He told a San Diego audience near NAA facilities, "I endorse wholeheartedly the B-70 manned aircraft." Kennedy also made similar campaign claims regarding other aircraft: near the Seattle Boeing plant he affirmed the need for B-52s and in Fort Worth he praised the B-58.

The Air Force changed the program to full weapon development and awarded a contract for an XB-70 prototype and 11 YB-70s in August 1960. In November 1960, the B-70 program received a $265 million (equivalent to $2.9 billion today) appropriation from Congress for FY 1961. Nixon, trailing in his home state of California, also publicly endorsed the B-70, and on 30 October Eisenhower helped the Republican campaign with a pledge of an additional $155 million ($1.7 billion today) for the B-70 development program.

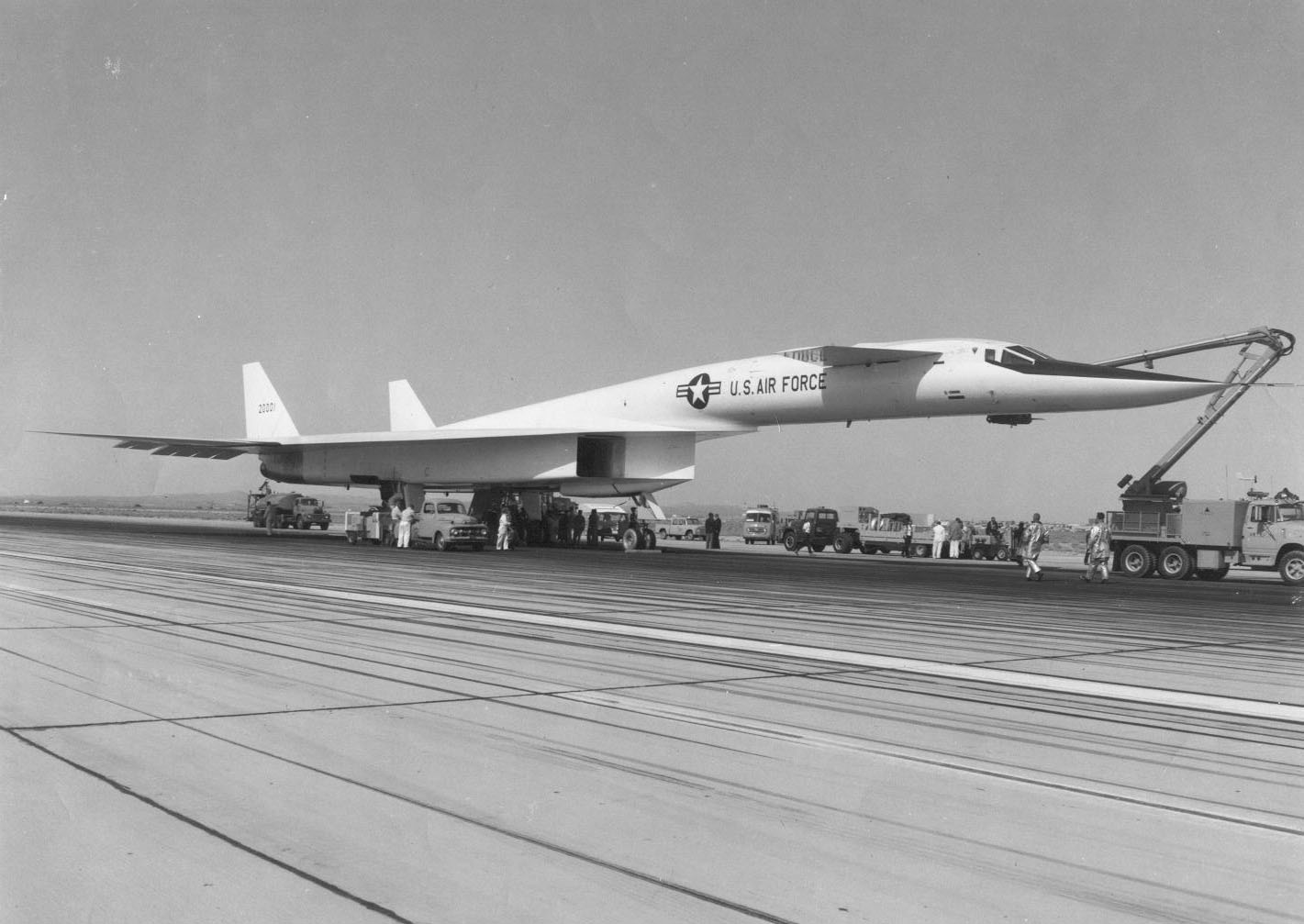
XB-70A on the taxiway on 21 September 1964, the day of the first flight

On taking office in January 1961, Kennedy was informed that the missile gap was an illusion. (Note: Wiesner ... a member of Eisenhower's permanent Science Advisory Committee, explained that the missile gap was a fiction. The new president greeted the news with a single expletive "delivered more in anger than in relief".... Herken 1961, p. 140. This quote taken from Herken's interview with Wiesner conducted 9 February 1982.) On 28 March 1961, after $800 million (equivalent to $8.6 billion today) had been spent on the B-70 program, Kennedy canceled the project as "unnecessary and economically unjustifiable" because it "stood little chance of penetrating enemy defenses successfully." Instead, Kennedy recommended "the B-70 program be carried forward essentially to explore the problem of flying at three times the speed of sound with an airframe potentially useful as a bomber." After Congress approved $290 million ($3.1 billion today) of B-70 "add-on" funds to the President's 12 May 1960 modified FY 1961 budget, the Administration decided on a "Planned Usage" of only $100 million ($1,080 million today) of these funds. The Department of Defense subsequently presented data to Congress that the B-70 would add little performance for the high cost.

After becoming the new Air Force Chief of Staff in July 1961, Curtis LeMay increased his B-70 advocacy, including interviews for August Reader's Digest and November Aviation Week articles, and allowing a 25 February General Electric tour at which the press was provided artist conceptions of, and other info about, the B-70. Congress had also continued B-70 appropriations to resurrect bomber development. After Secretary of Defense Robert McNamara explained again to the House Armed Services Committee (HASC) on 24 January 1962 that the B-70 was unjustifiable, LeMay subsequently argued for the B-70 to both the House and Senate committees—and was chastised by McNamara on 1 March. By 7 March 1962, the HASC, 21 of whose members had B-70 work in their districts, had written an appropriations bill to "direct"—by law—the Executive Branch to use all of the nearly $500 million (equivalent to $5.3 billion today) appropriated for the RS-70 (see Variants). McNamara was unsuccessful with an address to the HASC on 14 March, but a 19 March 1962 11th hour White House Rose Garden agreement between Kennedy and HASC chairman Carl Vinson retracted the bill's language and the bomber remained canceled.

=== Experimental aircraft ===
XB-70A Progress Report No. 14, 1965, Official de-classified USAF development information film reel.

The XB-70s were intended to be used for the advanced study of aerodynamics, propulsion, and other subjects related to large supersonic transports. The crew was reduced to only the two pilots, as a navigator and a bombardier were not needed for this research role. The production order was reduced to three prototypes in March 1961 with the third aircraft to incorporate improvements from the previous prototype. The order was later reduced to two experimental XB-70As, named Air Vehicle 1 and 2 (AV-1 and AV-2). XB-70 No. 1 was completed on 7 May 1964, and rolled out on 11 May 1964 at Palmdale, California. One report stated "nothing like it existed anywhere". AV-2 was completed on 15 October 1964. The manufacture of the third prototype (AV-3) was canceled in July 1964 before completion. The first XB-70 carried out its maiden flight in September 1964 and many more test flights followed.

The data from the XB-70 test flights and aerospace materials development were used in the later B-1 bomber program, the American supersonic transport (SST) program, and via espionage, the Soviet Union's Tupolev Tu-144 SST program. (Note: In response to the British/French treaty in 1962 that lead to the Concorde SST, President John F. Kennedy began the American SST project in June 1963. North American entered a design with some elements from the B-70, but it was eliminated from the competition in June 1964.) (Note: Following the 1963 formation of the National Supersonic Transport program, the 1964 Oklahoma City sonic boom tests "influenced the 1971 cancellation of the Boeing 2707 supersonic transport and led to the United States' complete withdrawal from SST design.") The development of the Lockheed U-2 and the SR-71 Blackbird reconnaissance aircraft, as well as the XB-70, prompted Soviet aerospace engineers to design and develop their high-altitude and high-speed MiG-25 interceptor.

== Design ==
The Valkyrie was designed to be a high-altitude Mach 3 bomber with six engines. Harrison Storms shaped the aircraft with a canard surface and a delta wing, which was built largely of stainless steel, sandwiched honeycomb panels, and titanium. The XB-70 was designed to use supersonic technologies developed for the Mach 3 SM-64 Navaho, as well as a modified form of the Navaho's inertial guidance system.

The XB-70 used compression lift, which resulted from a shock wave generated by the leading edge of the engine intake splitter below the apex of the wing. At Mach 3 cruising speed, the shock wave is bent back about 65 degrees and the wing is superimposed on the shock system which has a pressure 40 pounds per square foot (1.9 kPa) higher under the aircraft than in front of the shock. The compression lift provided five percent of the total lift. Camber was added to the wing leading edge inboard of the folding tips to improve subsonic handling and reduce supersonic drag. The outer portions of the wings were hinged to pivot downward by 65 degrees, acting as a type of variable-geometry wingtip device. This increased the aircraft's directional stability at supersonic speeds, shifted the center of pressure to a more favorable position at high speeds, and caused the shock originating at the intake splitter to reflect from the vertical tip surface giving additional compression lift.

Like a number of other delta-wing aircraft designed for supersonic speeds (Concorde, Tu-144, FD2), the Valkyrie needed a feature to improve the pilot's view during nose-high low-speed flight and on the ground. An outer windshield and ramp, which could be lowered, was provided enabling viewing through the fixed cockpit windshield. With the ramp raised into its high-speed position, the forebody was more streamlined. Rain removal and windshield anti-ice was accomplished by utilizing 600 °F (320 °C) bleed air from the engines. The lower forward section included a radar bay, and production machines were to be equipped with a refueling receptacle on the upper surface of the forward fuselage.

The XB-70 was equipped with six General Electric YJ93-GE-3 turbojet engines, which used JP-6 jet fuel, specially formulated for the mission requirements. The engine was stated to be in the "30,000-pound class", but actually produced 28,000 lbf (120 kN) with afterburner and 19,900 lbf (89 kN) without afterburner. The engine air intake is of a 2-D external/internal compression (or mixed compression) ramp design to ensure efficient pressure recovery at high Mach numbers. The internal supersonic diffusion had the risk of experiencing an "unstart" (internal shockwaves rapidly and violently expelled out the front of the duct) from disturbances such as an engine surge causing a significant change in airflow; the intake throat was thus configured automatically to ensure adequate unstart margin during operation. The Valkyrie used fuel for cooling; it was pumped through heat exchangers before reaching the engines. To reduce the likelihood of autoignition, nitrogen was injected into the JP-6 during refueling, and the "fuel pressurization and inerting system" vaporized a 700-pound (320 kg) supply of liquid nitrogen to fill the fuel tank vent space and maintain tank pressure.

== Operational history ==
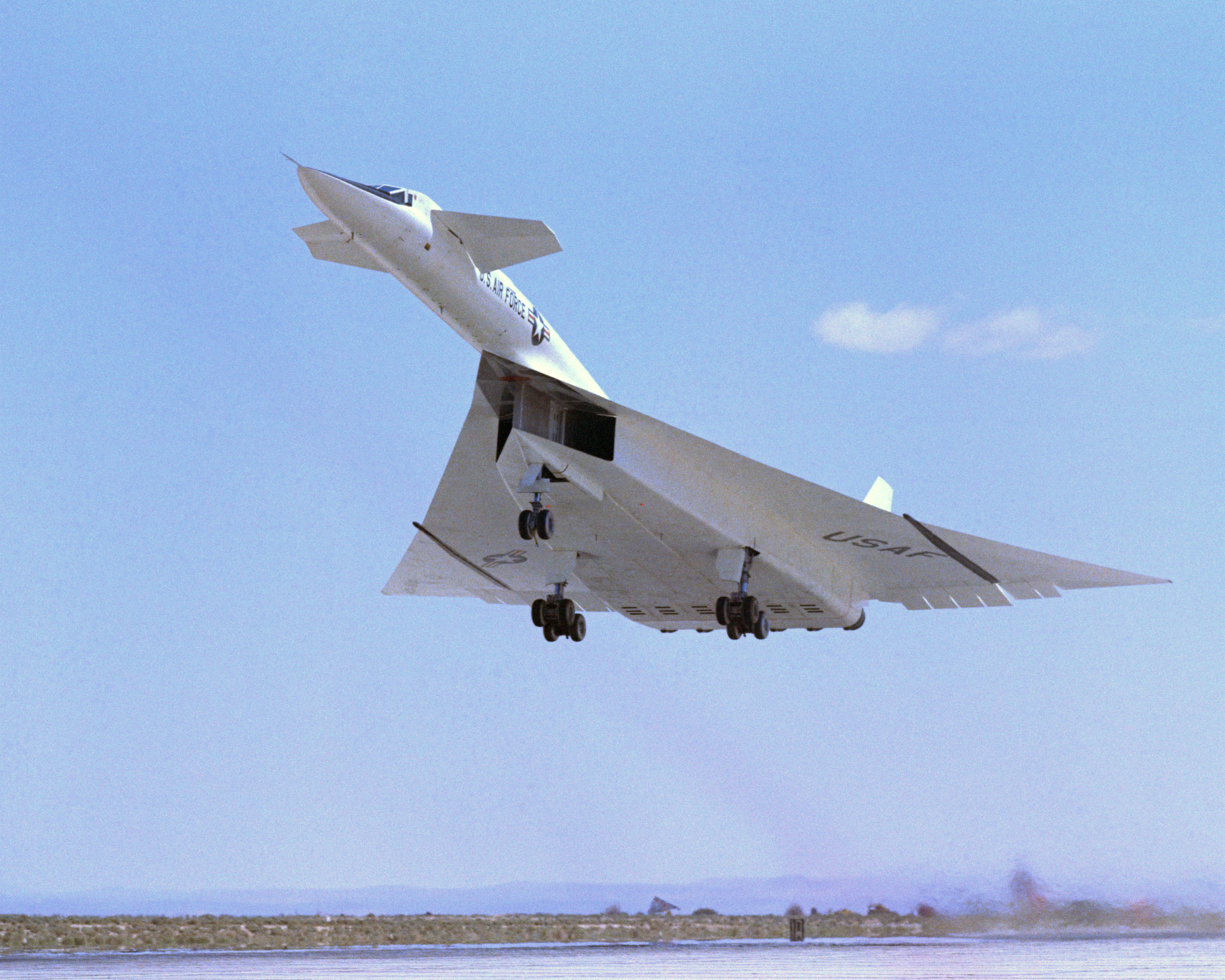
XB-70A Valkyrie taking off in August 1965

The XB-70's maiden flight was on 21 September 1964. In the first flight test, between Palmdale and Edwards AFB, one engine had to be shut down shortly after take-off, and an undercarriage malfunction warning meant that the flight was flown with the undercarriage down as a precaution, limiting speed to 390 mph (630 km/h) – about half that planned. During landing, the rear wheels of the port side main gear locked, the tires ruptured, and a fire started.

The Valkyrie first became supersonic (Mach 1.1) on the third test flight on 12 October 1964, and flew above Mach 1 for 40 minutes during the following flight on 24 October. The wing tips were also lowered partially in this flight. XB-70 No. 1 surpassed Mach 3 on 14 October 1965 by reaching Mach 3.02 at 70,000 ft (21,000 m). The first aircraft was found to suffer from weaknesses in the honeycomb panels, primarily due to inexperience with fabrication and quality control of this new material. On two occasions, honeycomb panels failed and were torn off during supersonic flight, necessitating a Mach 2.5 limit being placed on the aircraft.

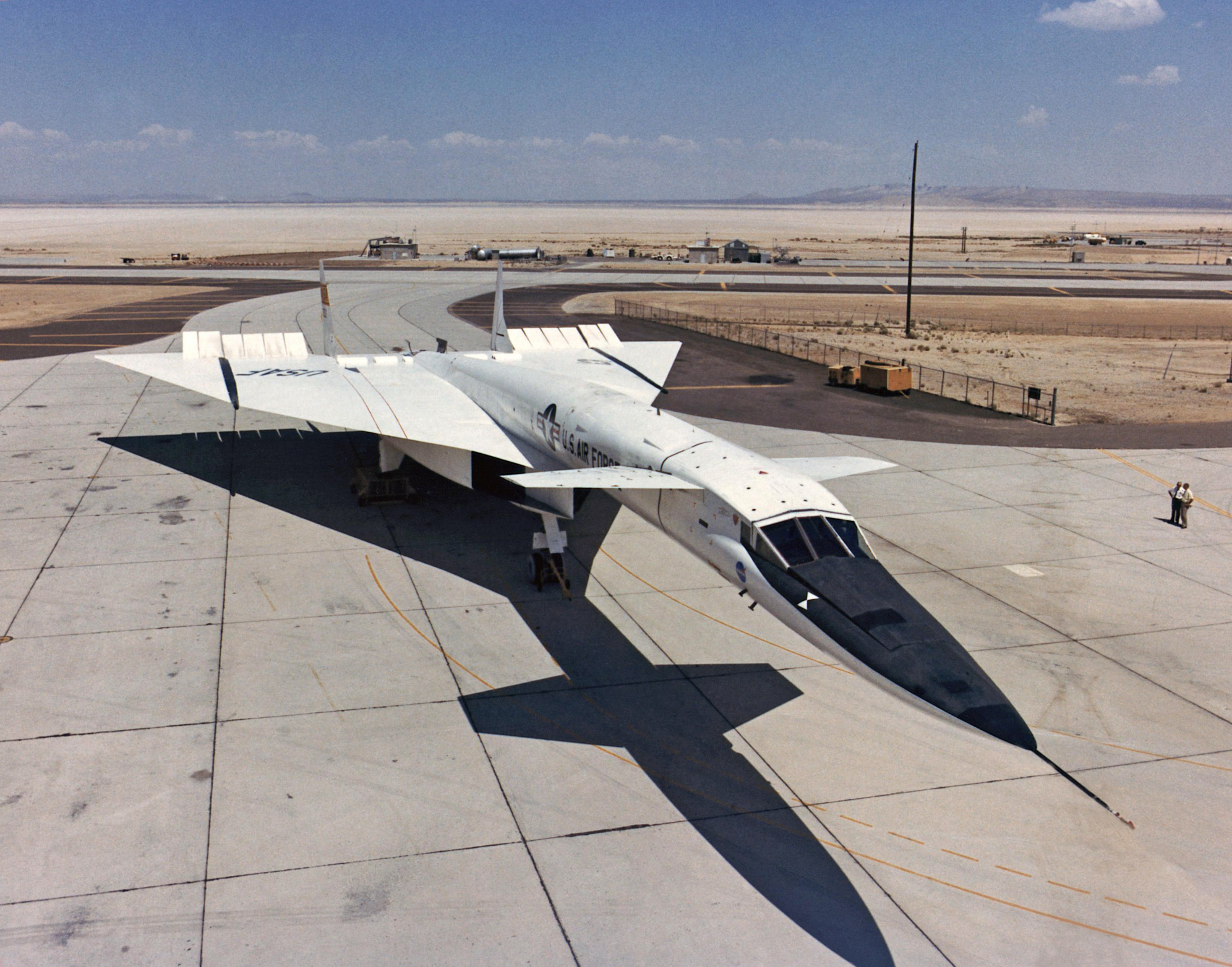
XB-70A parked at Edwards Air Force Base, 1967

The deficiencies discovered on AV-1 were almost completely solved on the second XB-70, which first flew on 17 July 1965. On 3 January 1966, XB-70 No. 2 attained a speed of Mach 3.05 while flying at 72,000 ft (22,000 m). AV-2 reached a top speed of Mach 3.08 and maintained it for 20 minutes on 12 April 1966. On 19 May 1966, AV-2 reached Mach 3.06 and flew at Mach 3 for 32 minutes, covering 2,400 mi (3,900 km) in 91 minutes of total flight.

XB-70 performance records
Longest flight	3:40 hours	6 January 1966
Fastest speed	2,020 mph (3,250 km/h)	12 January 1966
Highest altitude	74,000 ft (23,000 m)	19 March 1966
Highest Mach number	Mach 3.08	12 April 1966
Sustained Mach 3	32 minutes	19 May 1966
Mach 3 total	108 minutes/10 flights	–

A joint NASA/USAF research program was conducted from 3 November 1966 to 31 January 1967 for measuring the intensity and signature of sonic booms for the National Sonic Boom Program. Testing was planned to cover a range of sonic boom overpressures on the ground similar to but higher than those anticipated from the proposed American SST. In 1966, AV-2 was selected for the program and was outfitted with test sensors. It flew the first sonic boom test on 6 June 1966, attaining a speed of Mach 3.05 at 72,000 ft (22,000 m). Two days later, AV-2 crashed following a mid-air collision with an F-104 while flying in a multi-aircraft formation, with two fatalities. Co-pilot Carl Cross and F-104 pilot Joseph Walker were killed, while pilot Alvin White survived. Sonic boom and later testing continued with XB-70A #1.

The second flight research program (NASA NAS4-1174) investigated "control of structural dynamics" from 25 April 1967 through the XB-70's last flight in 1969. At high altitude and high speed, the XB-70A experienced unwanted changes in altitude. NASA testing from June 1968 included two small vanes on the nose of AV-1 for measuring the response of the aircraft's stability augmentation system. AV-1 flew a total of 83 flights.

The XB-70's last supersonic flight took place on 17 December 1968. On 4 February 1969, AV-1 took its final flight to Wright-Patterson Air Force Base for museum display (now the National Museum of the United States Air Force). Flight data was collected on this subsonic trip. North American Rockwell completed a four-volume report on the B-70 that was published by NASA in April 1972.

== Variants ==
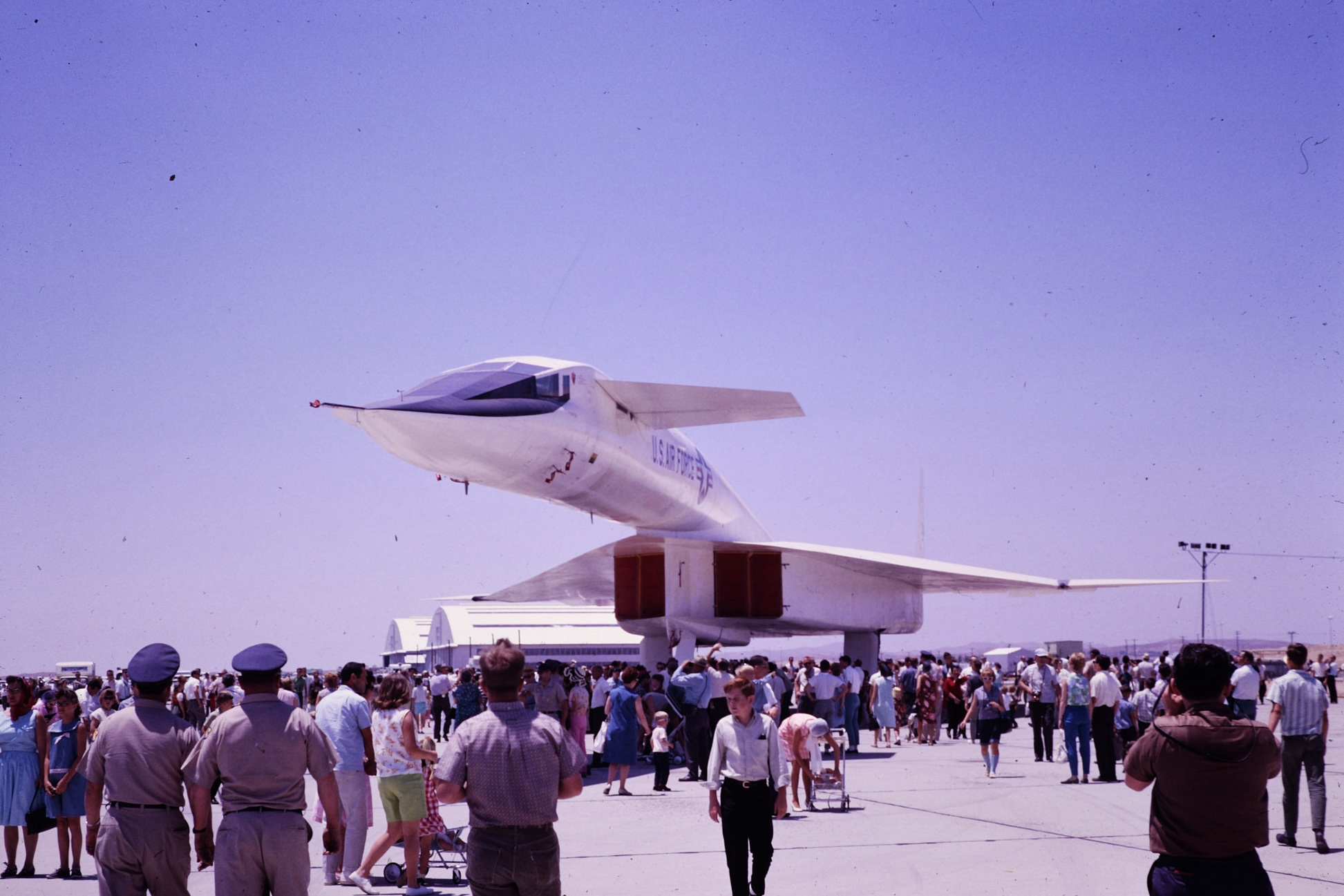
XB-70A AV-2 at the Palmdale Air Show in May 1966

XB-70A
Prototype of B-70. Two were built.
- AV-1, NAA Model Number NA-278, USAF S/N 62-0001, completed 83 flights spanning 160 hours and 16 minutes.
- AV-2, NAA Model Number NA-278, USAF S/N 62-0207, flew 46 times over 92 hours and 22 minutes, before it crashed in June 1966.
XB-70B
AV-3, NAA Model Number NA-274, USAF S/N 62-0208, was originally to be the first YB-70A in March 1961. This advanced prototype was canceled during early manufacture.
YB-70
Planned preproduction version with improvements based on XB-70s.
B-70A
Planned bomber production version of Valkyrie. A fleet of up to 65 operational bombers was planned.
RS-70
Proposed reconnaissance-strike version, the overall B-70 program intended to go into service with Strategic Air Command as a wing of RS-70s, in mid-1964.
NAC-60
- Proposed supersonic transport. First developed by North American in 1961, it was intended to carry 187 passengers at speed in excess of Mach 2. Multiple revisions of this proposal were submitted to the FAA as North American's bid for the National Supersonic Transport program. The NAC-60 would use a scaled-up design based on the XB-70 bomber, which would be mated to a less tapered fuselage and a new compound-delta wing; the airliner's cabin would be capable of seating as many as 187 passengers. The NAC-60 was expected to have a maximum take-off weight of 480,000 pounds (220,000 kg), and would have a range of 3,389 nautical miles (6,276 km; 3,900 mi) at a cruising speed of Mach 2.65.

== Incidents and accidents ==
=== Incidents ===
On 7 May 1965, a 3-foot (1 m) piece of the apex of the wing broke off in flight and caused extensive damage to five of the six engines. They were sent to GE and repaired. The sixth engine was inspected and re-installed in the aircraft.

On 14 October 1965, AV-1 surpassed Mach 3, but heat and stress damaged the honeycomb panels, leaving 2 ft (60 cm) of the leading edge of the left wing missing. The first aircraft was limited to Mach 2.5 afterwards.

=== Mid-air collision ===
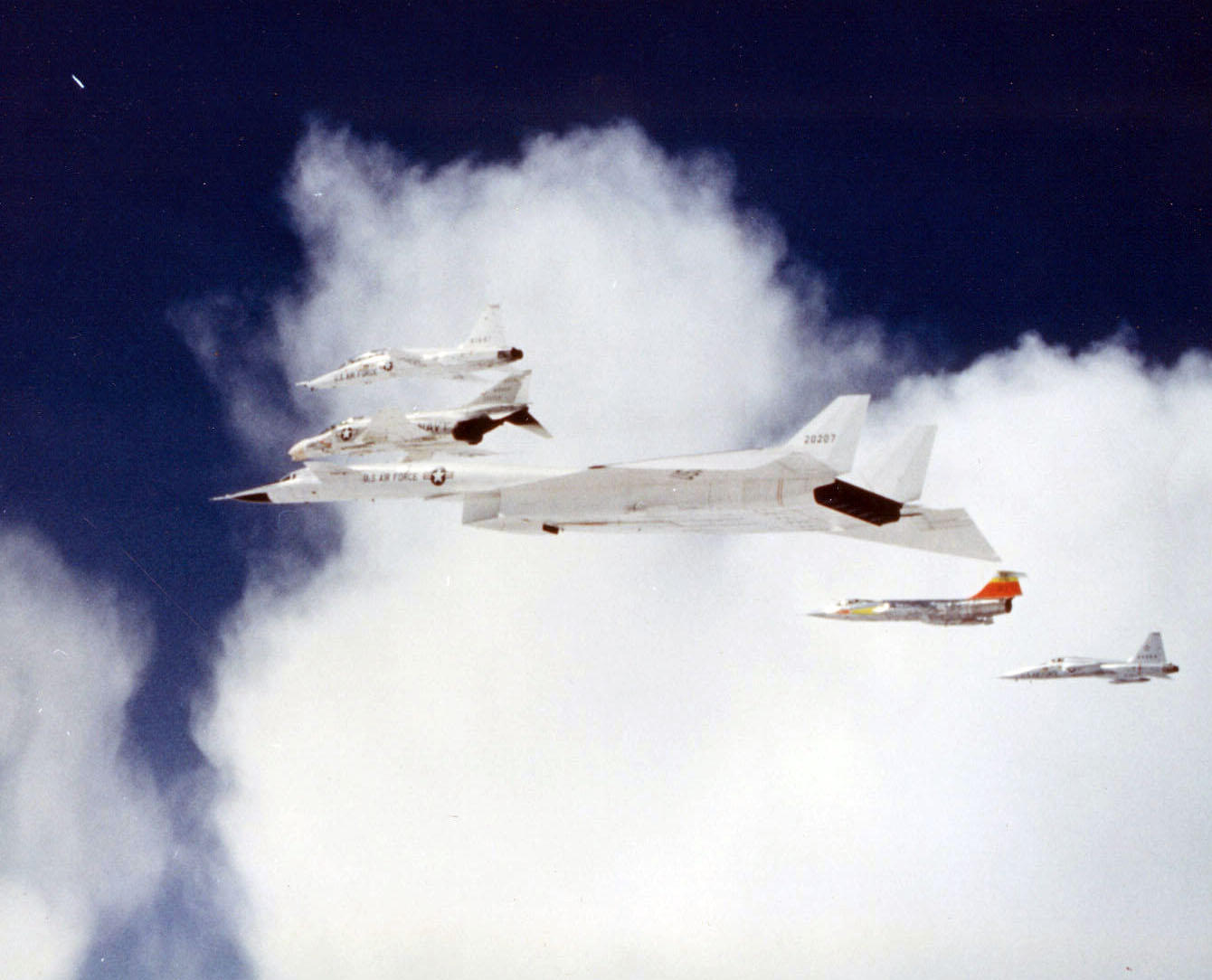
The aircraft formation before the collision on 8 June 1966; the F-104, with a red tail, is the second plane from the right.

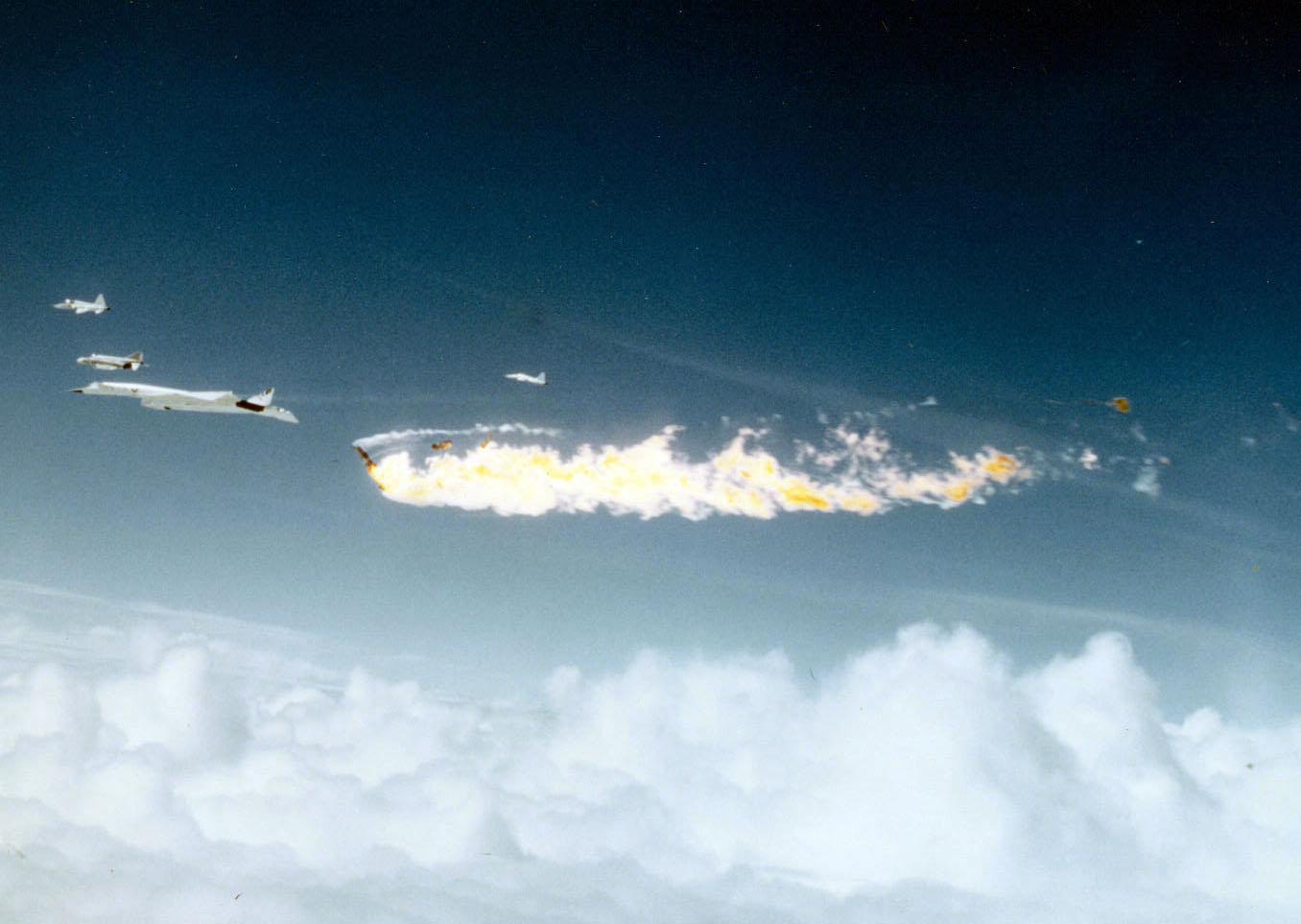
Immediately after the collision: the F-104 has exploded, and XB-70A AV-2 has lost one of its vertical stabilizers, and a portion of the second one. The F-4, F-5 and T-38 have yet to break formation.

On 8 June 1966, XB-70A No. 2 was in close formation with four other aircraft (an F-4 Phantom, an F-5, a T-38 Talon, and an F-104 Starfighter) for a photoshoot at the behest of General Electric, manufacturer of the engines of all five aircraft. A sixth aircraft, a Learjet 23, had been contracted by General Electric to photograph the formation.

After the photoshoot, the F-104 drifted into the XB-70's right wingtip, flipped and rolled inverted over the top of the Valkyrie, before striking the bomber's vertical stabilizers and left wing. The F-104 then exploded, destroying the Valkyrie's vertical stabilizers and damaging its left wing. Despite the loss of both vertical stabilizers and damage to the wings, the Valkyrie flew straight for 16 seconds before it entered an uncontrollable spin and crashed north of Barstow, California. The F-104 pilot, NASA Chief Test Pilot Joe Walker, and the XB-70 co-pilot, USAF Major Carl Cross (1925-1966), were killed. The XB-70 pilot, Al White, ejected, sustaining serious injuries, including the crushing of his arm by the closing clamshell-like escape crew capsule moments just before ejection.

The USAF summary report of the accident investigation stated that, given the position of the F-104 relative to the XB-70, Walker, the F-104 pilot, would not have been able to see the XB-70's wing, except by uncomfortably looking back over his left shoulder. The report said that it was likely that Walker maintained his position by looking at the fuselage of the XB-70, forward of his position. The F-104 was estimated to be 70 ft (21 m) to the side of the fuselage of the XB-70 and 10 ft (3.0 m) below. The report concluded that from that position, without appropriate sight cues, Walker was unable to properly perceive his motion relative to the Valkyrie, which led to his aircraft drifting into the XB-70's wing. The accident investigation also said the wake vortex from the XB-70's right wingtip might have caused the F-104 to roll into the bomber.

The General Electric photoshoot had not been authorized by the Air Force. After the catastrophe, Col. Albert W. Cate was dismissed from his position, and Col. Joe Cotton, Col. James G. Smith and John S. McCollom were reprimanded.

== Aircraft on display ==
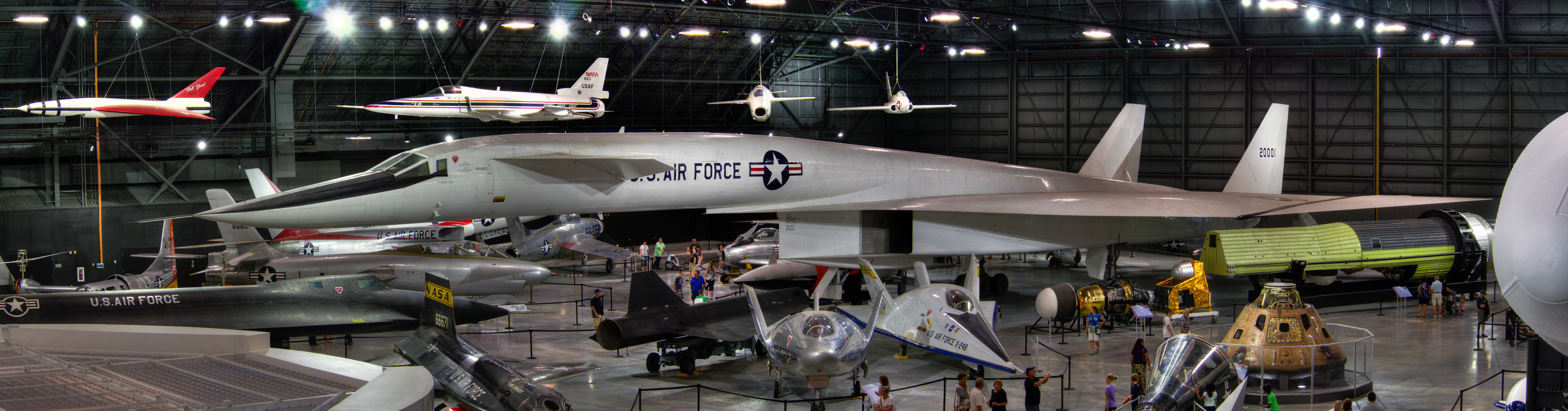
North American XB-70 Valkyrie at Wright-Patterson USAF Museum – June 2016

Valkyrie AV-1 (AF Ser. No. 62-0001) is on display at the National Museum of the United States Air Force at Wright-Patterson AFB near Dayton, Ohio. The aircraft was flown to the museum on 4 February 1969, following the conclusion of the XB-70 testing program. The Valkyrie became the museum's signature aircraft, appearing on Museum letterhead, and even appearing as the chief design feature for the museum's restaurant, the Valkyrie Cafe. In 2011, the XB-70 was on display in the museum's Research & Development Hangar alongside other experimental aircraft. After completion of the fourth hangar at the museum's main campus, the XB-70 was moved there in late October 2015.

== Specifications (XB-70A) ==
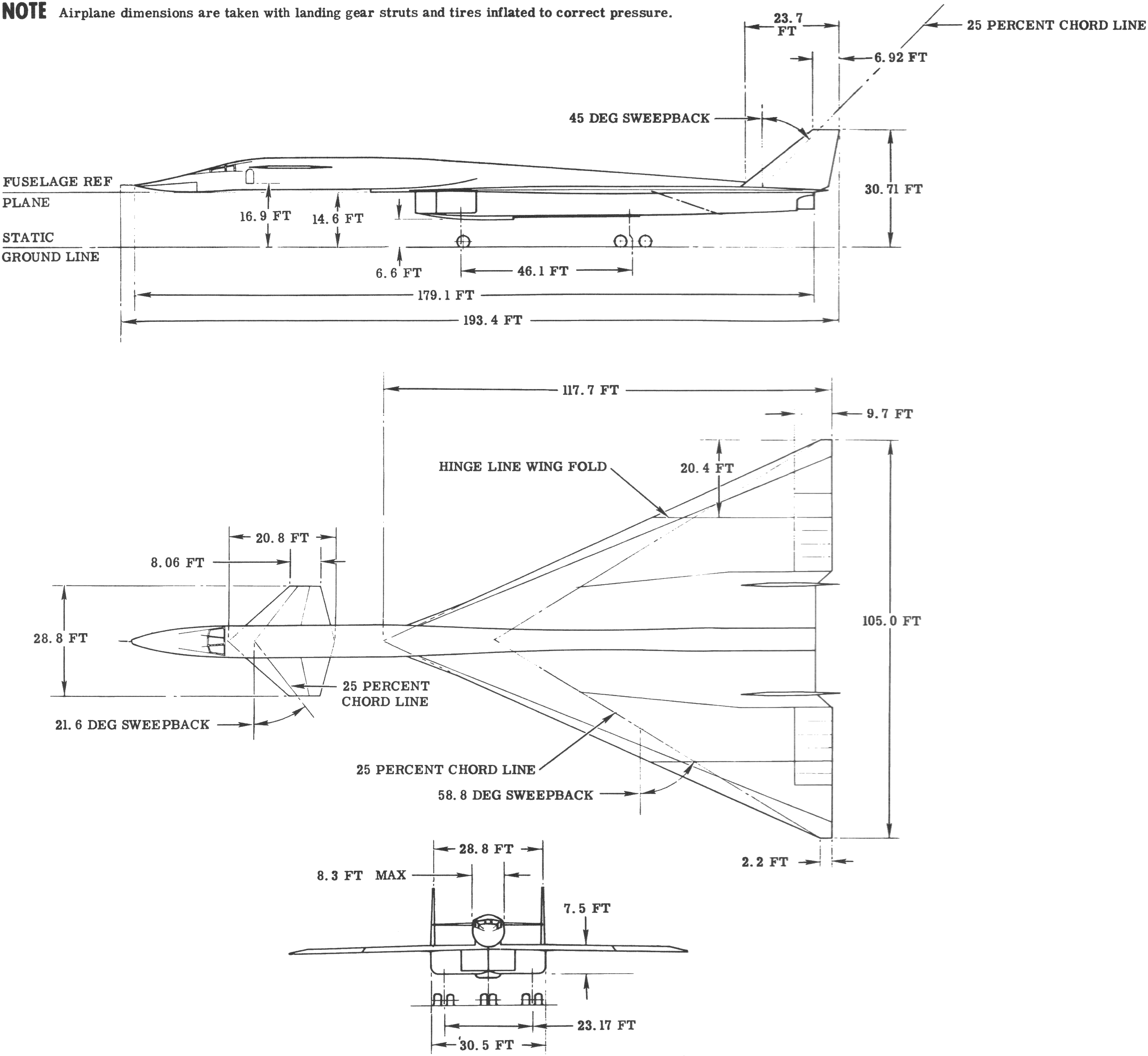
3-view line drawing of the North American XB-70A Valkyrie

Data from Pace, USAF XB-70 Fact sheet, B-70 Aircraft Study, and others

General characteristics

- Crew: 2
- Length: 185 ft 0 in (56.39 m)
- Wingspan: 105 ft 0 in (32.00 m)
- Height: 30 ft 0 in (9.14 m)
- Wing area: 6,297 sq ft (585.0 m^{2})
- Airfoil: Hexagonal; 0.30 Hex modified root, 0.70 Hex modified tip
- Empty weight: 253,600 lb (115,031 kg)
- Gross weight: 534,700 lb (242,536 kg)
- Max takeoff weight: 542,000 lb (245,847 kg)
- Fuel capacity: 300,000 pounds (140,000 kg) / 46,745 US gal (38,923 imp gal; 176,950 L)
- Powerplant: 6 × General Electric YJ93 afterburning turbojet, 19,900 lbf (89 kN) thrust each dry, 28,000 lbf (120 kN) with afterburner

Performance

- Maximum speed: 1,787 kn (2,056 mph, 3,310 km/h)
- Maximum speed: Mach 3.1
- Cruise speed: 1,738 kn (2,000 mph, 3,219 km/h)
- Combat range: 3,725 nmi (4,287 mi, 6,899 km)
- Service ceiling: 77,350 ft (23,580 m)
- Lift-to-drag: about 6 at Mach 2
- Wing loading: 84.93 lb/sq ft (414.7 kg/m^{2})
- Thrust/weight: 0.314

Armament

- 2 inner bomb bays and wing pylons with a max capacity of 53,000 lb

== See also ==
- Pye Wacket, a program to develop a defensive missile to be carried by the B-70
- ArmaLite AR-5 survival rifle (originally developed for XB-70 aircrew survival kits)

Related development

- North American NAC-60
- North American XF-108 Rapier

Aircraft of comparable role, configuration, and era

- Avro 730
- English Electric P.10
- Myasishchev M-50
- Sukhoi T-4
- Tupolev Tu-125

Related lists

- List of bomber aircraft
- List of military aircraft of the United States
