= Harrison Storms =

American aeronautical engineer

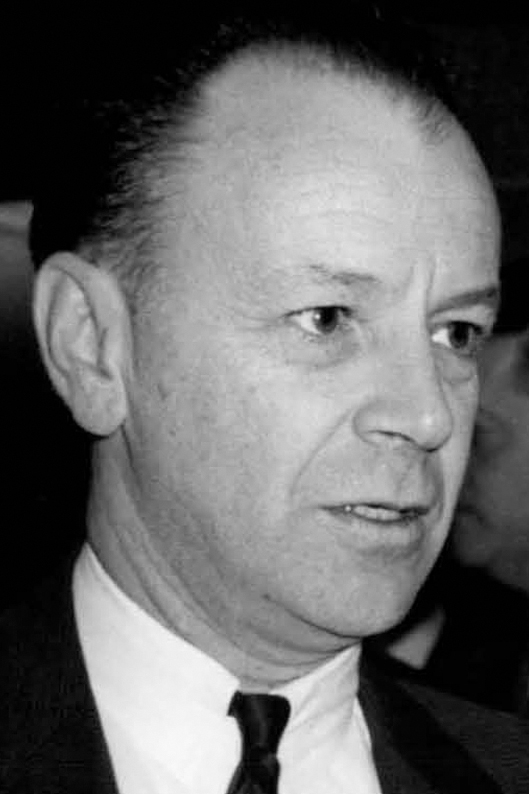
- Harrison Storms
- Born: July 15, 1915; Chicago. Illinois, U.S.
- Died: July 11, 1992 (aged 76); Rancho Palos Verdes, California, U.S.
- Education: California Institute of Technology
- Spouse: Phyllis Wermuth
- Children: 3
- Engineering career
- Discipline: Mechanical engineering
- Institutions: NASA
- Practice name: Aerospace engineering
- Employer: North American Aviation
- Projects: Apollo Space Program
- Significant design: North American X-15; S-II Second Stage Rocket
- Awards: International von Karman Wings Award for Lifetime Achievement

Harrison Allen "Stormy" Storms, Jr. (July 15, 1915 – July 11, 1992) was an American aeronautical engineer employed by North American Aviation, best known for his role in managing the design and construction of the Apollo Command/Service Module. North American came under severe criticism in 1965–66 by NASA's Apollo program director for cost overruns, delivery delays, and poor quality, and Storms was reassigned to the LA Division in 1967 in the aftermath of the Apollo 1 fire which killed three astronauts (Gus Grissom, Ed White, and Roger Chaffee).

== Biography ==
=== Early life and career ===
Storms grew up in Chicago's North Shore (Wilmette), the son of a traveling salesman. As a boy, he was a member of the Boy Scouts and enjoyed building model airplanes. He attended Northwestern University, where he graduated at the top of his class and remained for a master's degree in mechanical engineering. He then went to the California Institute of Technology to study for a second master's degree in aeronautical engineering under Theodore von Kármán.

Storms became an employee of North American Aviation. In 1955, he successfully led North American's bid for the contract to design and build the X-15 airplane, and, two years later, he became chief engineer of North American's Los Angeles division.

Research Project X-15 - development of the X-15 rocket plane, 1962. Storms speaking from 10:34.

=== Apollo program ===
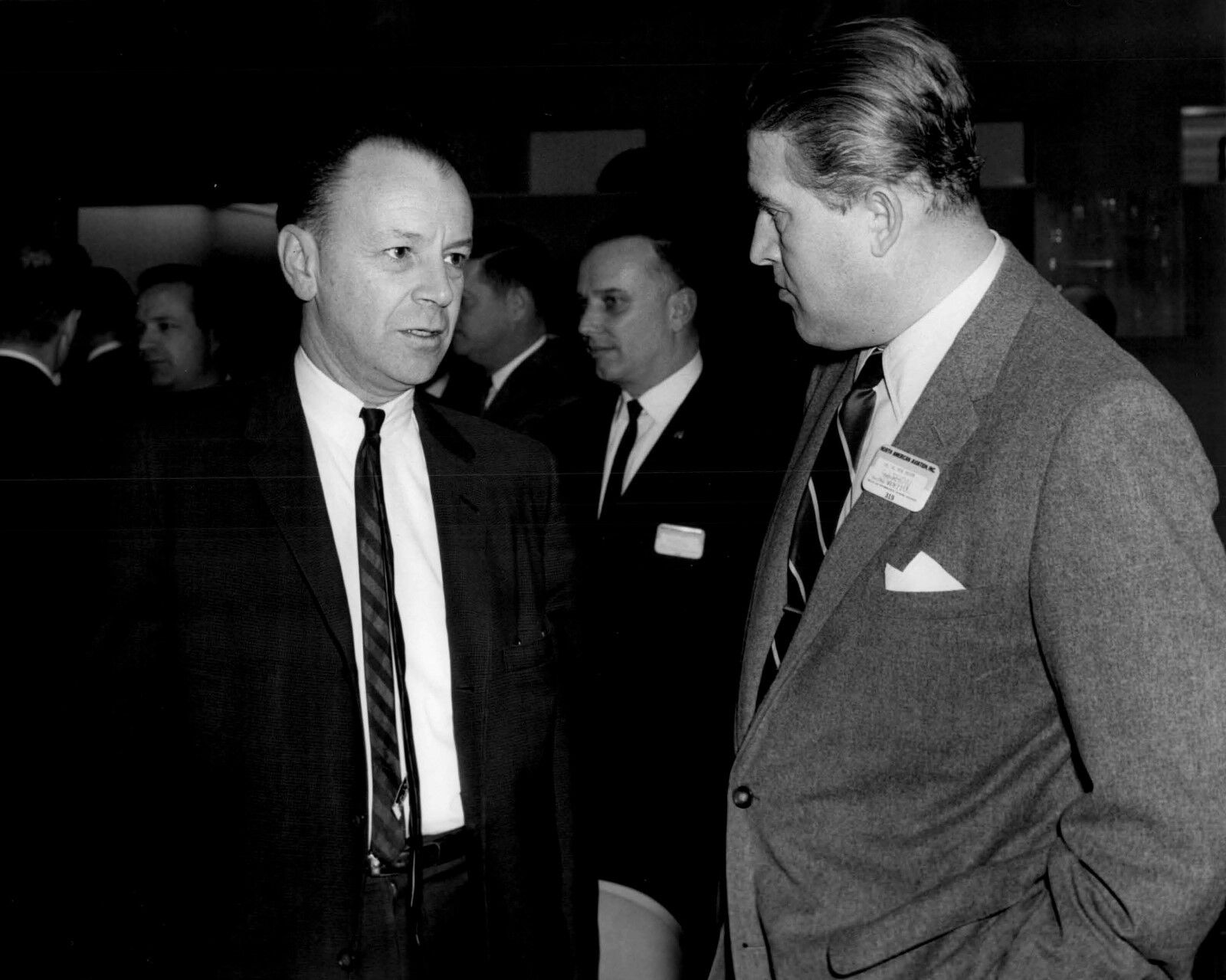
Harrison Storms and Wernher von Braun

In 1960, he was offered the opportunity to become head of North American's Missile Division, which at the time had only one contract: the AGM-28 Hound Dog missile. Storms was given the chance to lead North American's expansion into the business of spaceflight by Dutch Kindelberger and Lee Atwood. On September 11, 1961, North American won the contract for the S-II second stage of the Saturn V rocket. While this was a significant achievement, Storms was not satisfied, as he was also aiming for North American to win the contract for the Apollo spacecraft itself, which they did on November 28, 1961. Through the efforts of Storms' team and NAA Marketing VP Tom Dixon, Storms became known as "the father of Apollo" at NAA.

In 1961, Storms' management team, called "the Storm Troopers", consisted of Harold Raynor, Dr. Robert Laidlaw, John Paup, Charlie Feltz, Bill Snelling, Dale Myers, Norm Ryker Jr., Scott Crossfield, Frank Compton, Lloyd Harriott, Dr. Henry Swift, Earl Blount, and Dr. Toby Freedman, medical director. Storms was named president of the newly formed Space and Information Systems Division. In the first six months of 1962, employment expanded from 7,000 employees to 14,000 employees.

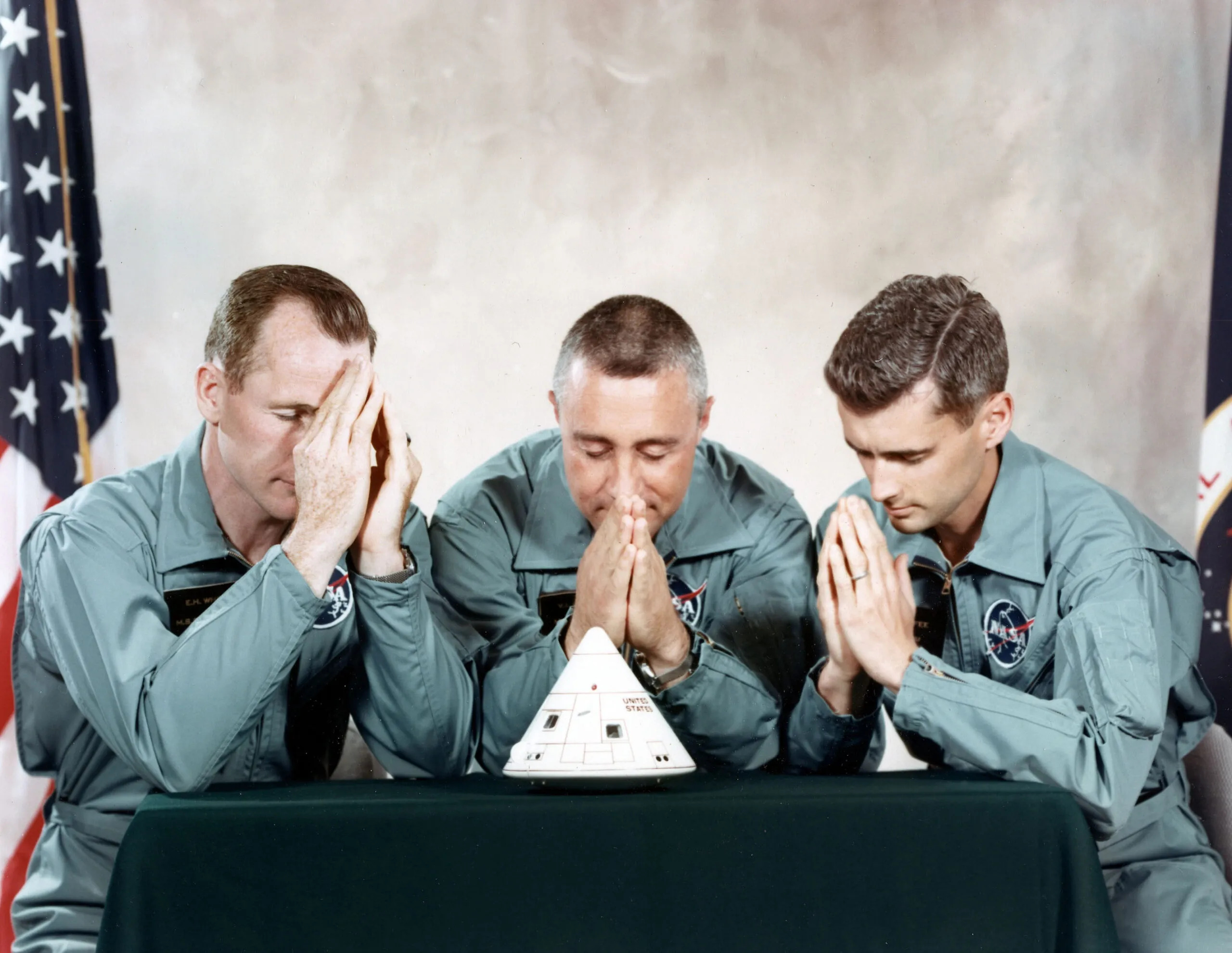
The Apollo 1 crew expressed their concerns about their spacecraft's problems by presenting this parody of their crew portrait to ASPO manager Joseph Shea on August 19, 1966.

North American's development of the S-II and the Apollo spacecraft did not always go smoothly under Storms' management. NASA's Apollo program director Samuel C. Phillips headed a "tiger team" sent to NAA in late 1965 to investigate program delays and cost overruns, and sent a critical report documenting his findings and demanding corrective steps be taken, to his superiors and to Atwood in early 1966. Spacecraft CSM-011, used in the second uncrewed suborbital test flight, was delivered to Cape Kennedy in 1966 with problems which delayed its flight by one month. Problems with the S-II and CSM-017 also delayed the first Saturn V test flight from late 1966 to November 1967. CSM-012, to be used in Apollo 1, the first crewed flight, had even more problems with electrical wiring and ethylene glycol plumbing which delayed this flight as well, some of which contributed to a fire which killed astronauts Gus Grissom, Ed White and Roger Chaffee on January 27, 1967. After the fire, NASA Administrator James Webb demanded the resignation of either Atwood or Storms. Atwood decided to reassign Storms.

Storms' relationship with NASA's Apollo Spacecraft Program Office manager, Joseph Shea, was difficult at times. While Shea blamed North American's management for the continuing difficulties in the development of Apollo, Storms felt that NASA itself was far from blameless. According to Storms, NASA had delayed in making key design decisions and persisted in making significant changes to the design once construction had begun. While Shea did his part in attempting to control the change requests, Storms felt that Shea did not understand or sympathize with the inevitable problems involved in the day-to-day work of manufacturing. Shea became unfit for duty and was removed as ASPO manager, although not fired.

== In popular culture ==
Screenwriter Mike Gray profiled Storms in his 1992 book, Angle of Attack. Publishers Weekly described it as a "swaggering portrait of NASA's Apollo project [which] might well be called Indiana Jones and the Engineering Mission of Destiny."

In the HBO miniseries From the Earth to the Moon, Storms was played by James Rebhorn.

In Stephen Baxter's alternate history novel Voyage, the character J. K. Lee is an amalgam of Storms and Tom Kelly. In the novel, Storms is a friend of the Lee character.

== Sources ==
- Gray, Mike (1992). Angle of Attack: Harrison Storms and the Race to the Moon. New York: Penguin Books. ISBN 0-14-023280-X.
- Murray, Charles; Cox, Catherine Bly (1989). Apollo: The Race to the Moon. New York: Simon and Schuster. ISBN 0-671-61101-1.
