= Jules Bergman =

American writer and journalist (1929–1987)

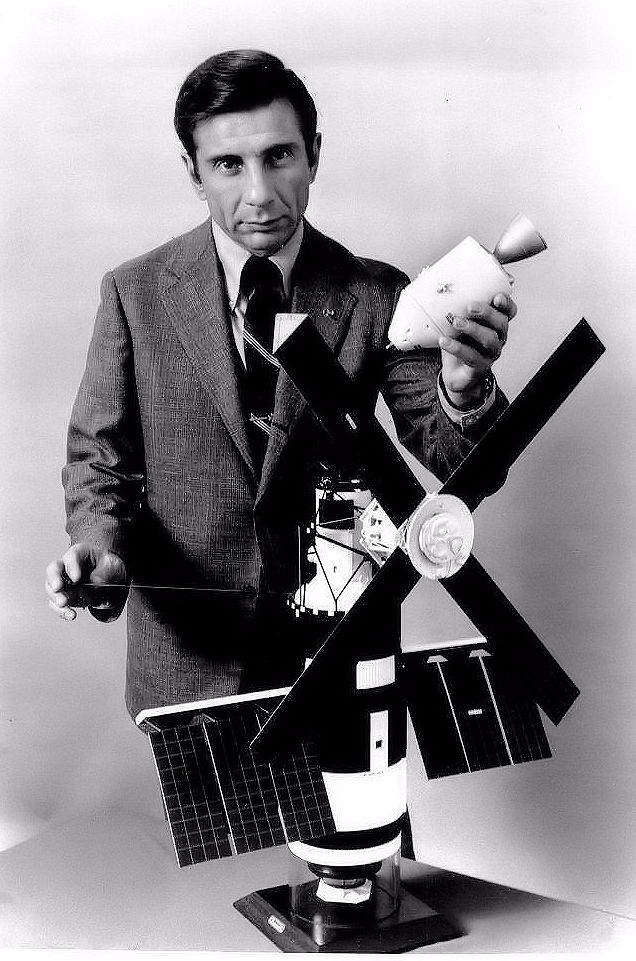
- Bergman with a model of Skylab, 1973.
- Born: March 21, 1929; New York City, U.S.
- Died: February 12, 1987 (aged 57); New York City, U.S.
- Occupations: News writer, television and radio broadcaster, science editor
- Years active: 1949–1986

Jules Bergman (March 21, 1929 – February 12, 1987) was an American broadcast writer and journalist who served as science editor for ABC News from 1961 until his death in 1987. He is most remembered for his coverage of the American space program.

A native of New York City, Bergman was educated at the City College of New York and Indiana University. While doing postgraduate work at Columbia University, Bergman held a Sloan-Rockefeller Advanced Science Writing Fellowship, which he completed in 1960.

== ABC News ==
Bergman began his journalism career in 1949 at Time magazine. He briefly worked at CBS News, then joined the news staff of WFDR-FM in New York, eventually becoming the station's assistant news director.

Bergman joined ABC News as a writer in 1953, specializing in science issues. In the late 1950s he began covering the activities of the Space Task Group. Bergman was named Science Editor in 1961, the same year that the first crewed Vostok and Mercury flights took place.

Though he became most famous for his work on covering space missions, Bergman covered stories in a range of areas, including aviation, defense matters, medicine, health, astronomy and public safety. He was pressed into service as a general assignment reporter on some special occasions. For example, after the assassination of President John F. Kennedy on November 22, 1963, Bergman was sent to New York's Times Square to report on citizens' reactions to the President's death.

== The space program ==
Bergman began covering developments in space exploration during the 1950s. He went on to cover the entirety of the Mercury, Gemini, Apollo, Skylab and Apollo–Soyuz programs for ABC.

Bergman's reporting for ABC was noted for its direct style. In contrast to the more avuncular style of CBS anchor Walter Cronkite, Bergman's reporting took a very serious tone, and was very direct (to the point of seeming pessimistic at times) about the possible consequences of any mishaps or accidents that took place during a spaceflight, such as the Apollo 13 accident. In order to more fully understand the astronauts and their missions, Bergman often took part in the same training and simulations that the astronauts did.

Bergman later covered the missions of NASA's uncrewed space probes, notably the Viking and Voyager programs. He also covered the Space Shuttle program from its first flights through the 1986 Challenger disaster.

=== "Phillips report" ===
After the Apollo 1 fire took the lives of astronauts Gus Grissom, Ed White and Roger B. Chaffee on January 27, 1967, Bergman discovered and revealed the existence of a NASA document that became known as the Phillips Report, which led to a minor scandal complicating NASA's recovery from the fire, and causing administrator James E. Webb much embarrassment. In November 1965, Apollo program director Samuel C. Phillips had led a team that investigated and documented the causes of delivery, quality, and cost problems with Apollo prime contractor North American Aviation. Phillips and his boss George Mueller had both severely chastised North American's management for the problems and demanded corrective action.

Immediately after the fire in 1967, NASA followed its established investigation protocol to identify the cause and recommend changes to prevent a recurrence, all under presidential and congressional oversight. No one in NASA's upper management expected that the Phillips findings would be printed as a document, but on February 13, Bergman was shown a copy at the Office of Manned Space Flight headquarters. He then told a junior Senator on the Aeronautical and Space Sciences Committee, Walter Mondale, about the document, and later reported its existence on ABC. Mondale proceeded to grill the top managers, including Webb, who was completely blind-sided, about the report's existence. Other senators, such as Margaret Chase Smith, then questioned Webb about NASA's choice of North American as the Apollo contractor. In its final report, the committee agreed with NASA that the Phillips review had absolutely no bearing on the fire, though the chairman expressed his disappointment that Webb had not kept them informed of Apollo program problems at the time. But Mondale issued a minority opinion accusing NASA of "evasiveness, ... lack of candor, ... patronizing attitude exhibited toward Congress, ... refusal to respond fully and forthrightly to legitimate congressional inquiries, and ... solicitous concern for corporate sensitivities at a time of national tragedy".

== Other science reporting ==
Though best known for his reporting on space issues, Bergman also filed many reports on medical issues for ABC. He reported on such issues as organ transplantation, arthritis, communicable diseases, the hazards of asbestos, and advances in the treatment of cancer.

Bergman wrote Ninety Seconds to Space: The Story of the X-15 (1960). He was particularly well known for his reportage on aviation and defense matters. Bergman began training for his private pilot certificate in 1958, and turned the story of his flight training into an instructional book, Anyone Can Fly (1964; revised 1977 and 1986). Bergman also reported on major aviation developments and disasters for ABC, and covered the development of new weapons systems for the military of the United States.

Bergman covered energy issues, including the oil crisis of the 1970s. He was a major contributor to ABC's coverage of the 1979 accident at the Three Mile Island Nuclear Generating Station.

Bergman also was a contributor to ABC's Close-Up series of documentaries. He won an Emmy Award for his work on the half-hour documentary Close-Up: On Fire. Bergman occasionally sat in as a guest host on the ABC public affairs series Issues and Answers, and contributed to other ABC programs, including Good Morning America and Nightline. In cooperation with ABC's Wide World of Sports, Bergman covered Evel Knievel's 1974 attempt to jump the Snake River Canyon.

== Final years ==
Bergman was diagnosed with a nonmalignant brain tumor and underwent surgery in the late 1970s. In the years following, he underwent additional surgeries to remove additional growths, and took anti-seizure medications.

Bergman was found dead in his New York apartment on February 12, 1987. A memorial service was held four days later in New York City, at which Bergman was eulogized by NASA astronaut Joseph P. Allen.

== Memorials and pop culture ==
The National Association of Physician Broadcasters named its award for excellence in reporting after Bergman. The award was named for Bergman until 1999.

Many television documentaries have featured clips from Bergman's reporting on the American space program. Footage of Bergman's reports also figured prominently in the 1995 motion picture Apollo 13 and the 2016 American biographical drama film Hidden Figures. Bergman portrayed himself in a 1974 episode of The Six Million Dollar Man titled "The Rescue of Athena One." Bergman was portrayed by Andrew Rubin in an episode of the 1998 HBO miniseries From The Earth To The Moon, titled "For Miles and Miles". He also appeared in clips and commentary in the first part of the three-part Chasing the Moon PBS documentary.
