= Apollo 1 =

Planned United States spaceflight (1967)

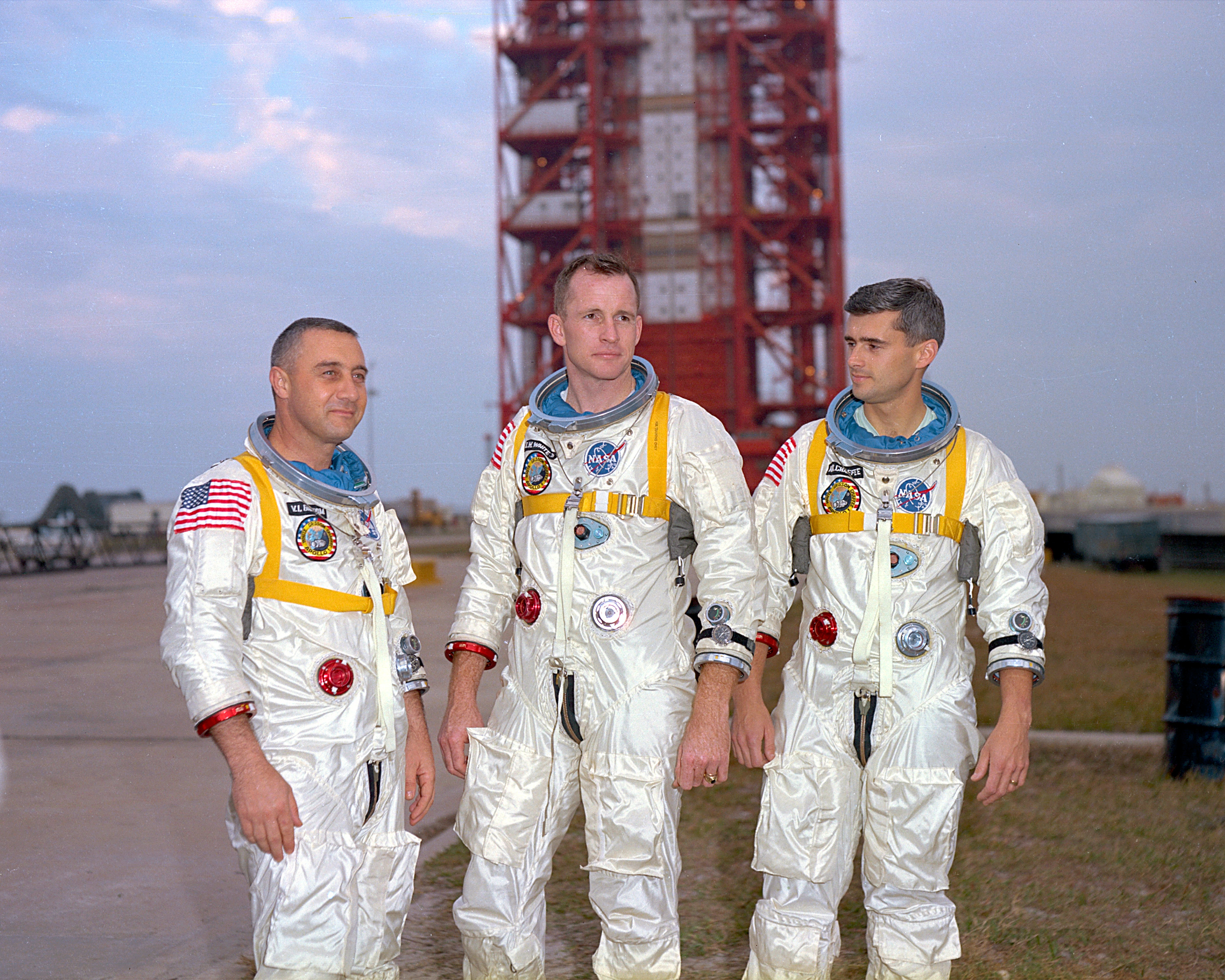
- Gus Grissom, Ed White, and Roger B. Chaffee (left to right) in front of the launch pad containing their AS-204 space vehicle
- Names: AS-204, Apollo 1
- Mission type: Crewed spacecraft verification test
- Operator: NASA
- Mission duration: Up to 14 days (planned)

Spacecraft properties
- Spacecraft: CSM-012
- Spacecraft type: Apollo command and service module, Block I
- Manufacturer: North American Aviation
- Launch mass: 20,000 kilograms (45,000 lb)

Crew
- Crew size: 3
- Members: Gus Grissom; Edward H. White II; Roger B. Chaffee

Start of mission
- Launch date: February 21, 1967 (planned)
- Rocket: Saturn IB AS-204
- Launch site: Cape Kennedy LC-34

End of mission
- Destroyed: January 27, 1967; 23:31:19 UTC

Orbital parameters
- Reference system: Geocentric
- Regime: Low Earth orbit
- Perigee altitude: 220 kilometers (120 nmi) (planned)
- Apogee altitude: 300 kilometers (160 nmi) (planned)
- Inclination: 31 degrees (planned)
- Period: 89.7 minutes (planned)
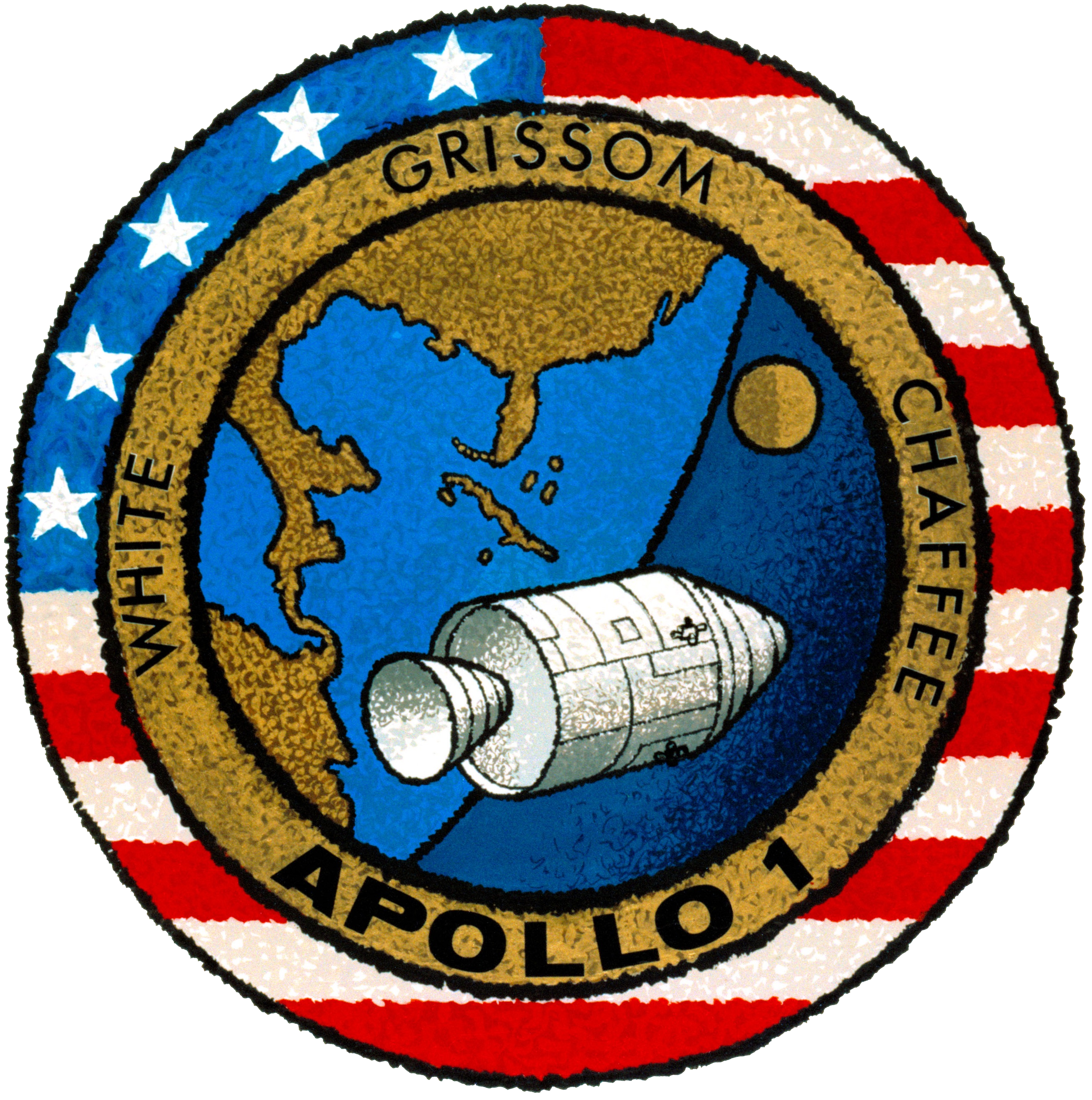
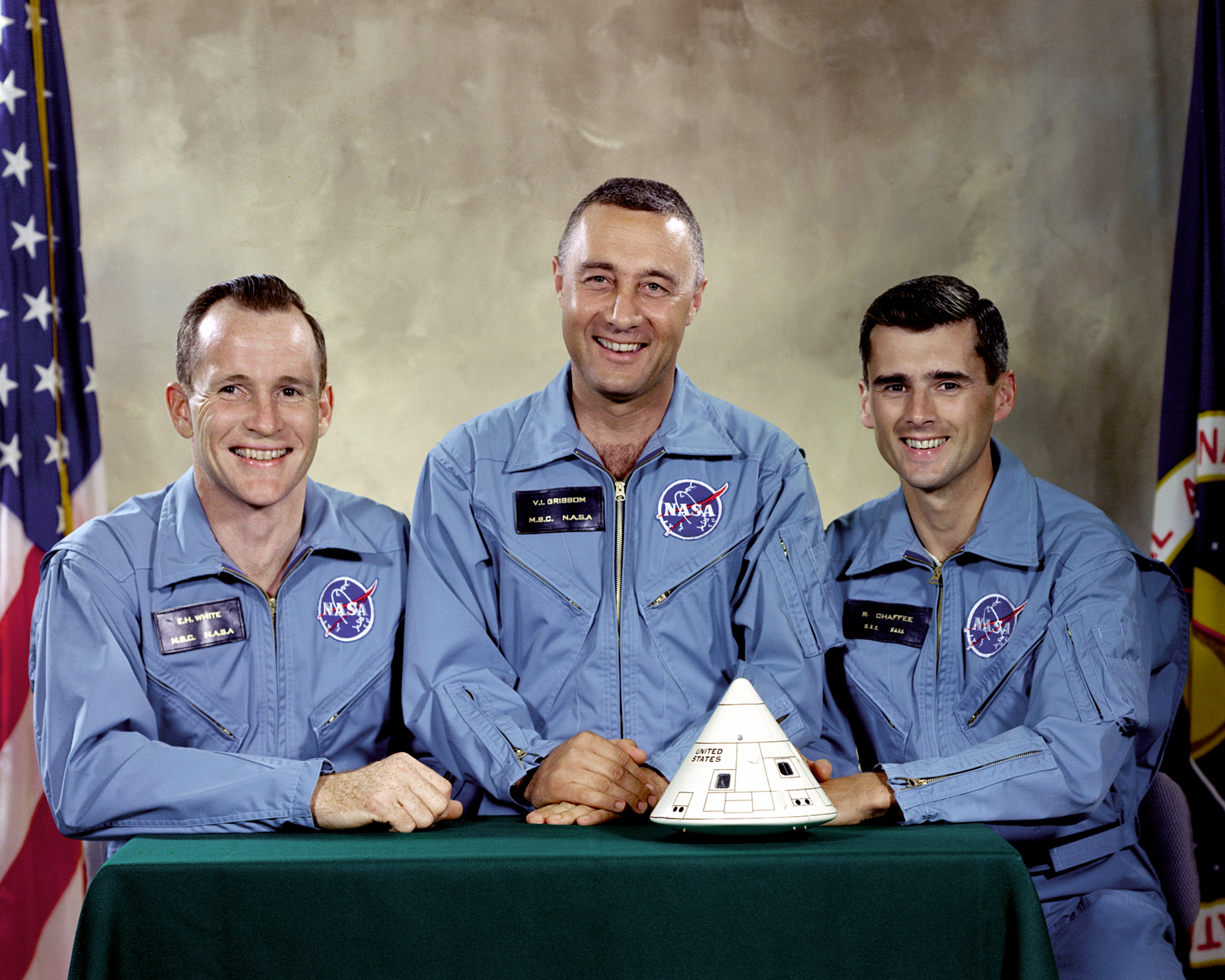
- From left: White, Grissom, Chaffee Apollo program

Apollo 1, initially designated AS-204, was planned to be the first crewed mission of the Apollo program, the American undertaking to land the first man on the Moon. It was planned to be launched on February 21, 1967, as the first low Earth orbital test of the Apollo command and service module. The mission never flew; a cabin fire during a launch rehearsal test at Cape Kennedy Air Force Station Launch Complex 34 on January 27, 1967 killed all three crew members—command pilot Gus Grissom, senior pilot Ed White, and pilot Roger B. Chaffee—and destroyed the command module (CM). The name Apollo 1, chosen by the crew, was made official by NASA in their honor after the fire.

Immediately after the fire, NASA convened an Accident Review Board to determine the cause of the fire, and both chambers of the United States Congress conducted their own committee inquiries to oversee NASA's investigation. The ignition source of the fire was determined to be electrical, and the fire spread rapidly due to combustible nylon material and the high-pressure pure oxygen cabin atmosphere. Rescue was prevented by the plug door hatch, which could not be opened against the internal pressure of the cabin. Because the rocket was unfueled, the test had not been considered hazardous, and emergency preparedness for it was poor.

During the congressional investigation, Senator Walter Mondale publicly revealed a NASA internal document citing problems with prime Apollo contractor North American Aviation, which became known as the Phillips Report. This disclosure embarrassed NASA administrator James E. Webb, who was unaware of the document's existence, and attracted controversy to the Apollo program. Despite congressional displeasure at NASA's lack of openness, both congressional committees ruled that the issues raised in the report had no bearing on the accident.

Crewed Apollo flights were suspended for twenty months while the command module's hazards were addressed. The development and uncrewed testing of the lunar module (LM) and Saturn V rocket continued. The Saturn IB launch vehicle for Apollo 1, AS-204, was used for the first LM test flight, Apollo 5. The first successful crewed Apollo mission was flown by Apollo 1's backup crew on Apollo 7 in October 1968.

== Crew ==
Position	Astronaut
Command Pilot	Gus Grissom; Would have been third spaceflight
Senior Pilot	Edward H. White II; Would have been second spaceflight
Pilot	Roger B. Chaffee; Would have been first spaceflight

=== First backup crew (April–December 1966) ===
Position	Astronaut
Command Pilot	James A. McDivitt
Senior Pilot	David R. Scott
Pilot	Russell L. "Rusty" Schweickart
This crew flew on Apollo 9.

=== Second backup crew (December 1966 – January 1967) ===
Position	Astronaut
Command Pilot	Walter M. "Wally" Schirra Jr.
Senior Pilot	Donn F. Eisele
Pilot	R. Walter Cunningham
This crew flew on Apollo 7.

== Apollo crewed test flight plans ==
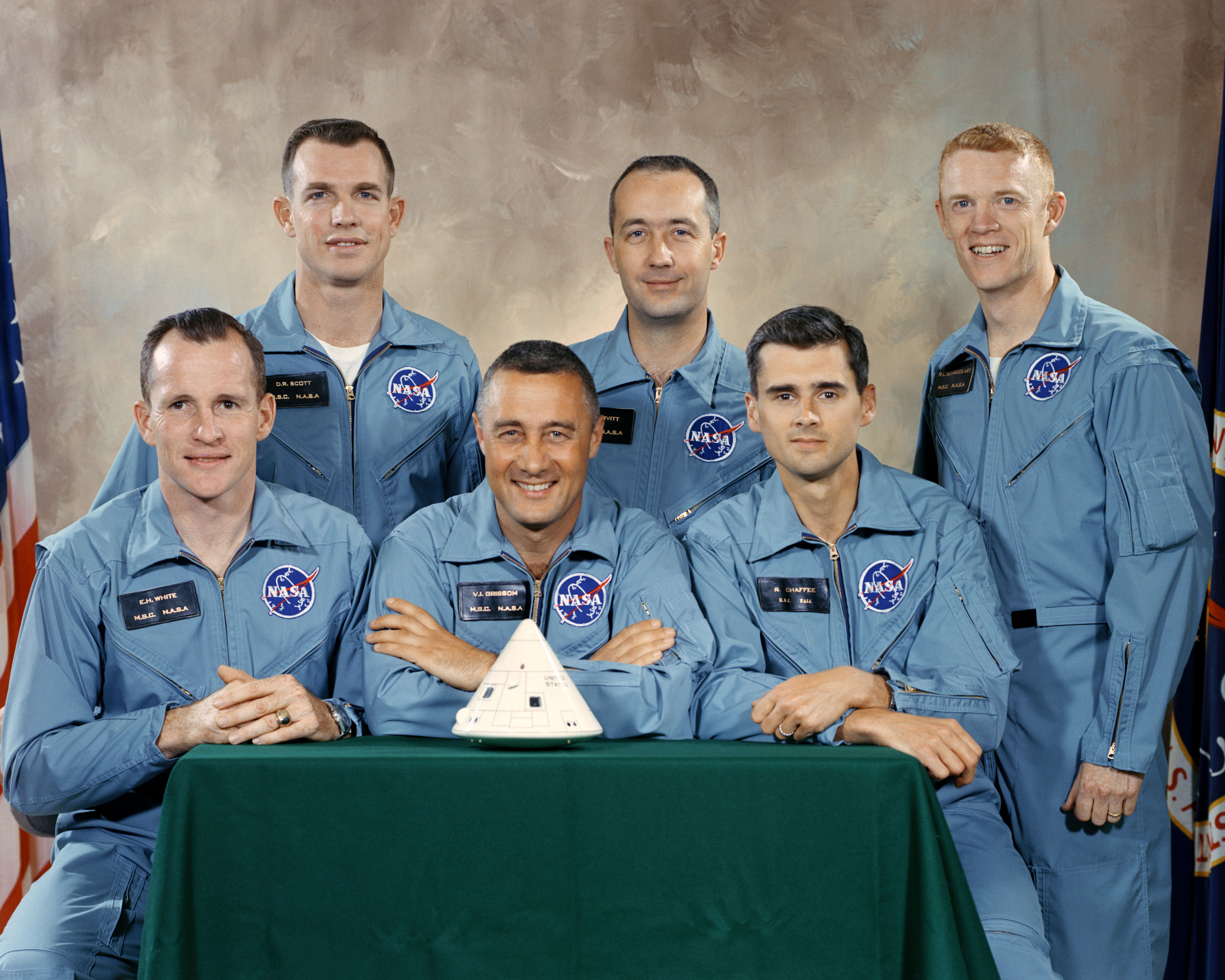
Official portrait of prime and backup crews for AS-204, as of April 1, 1966. The backup crew (standing) of McDivitt (center), Scott (left) and Schweickart were replaced by Schirra, Eisele and Cunningham in December 1966.

AS-204 was to be the first crewed test flight of the Apollo command and service module (CSM) to Earth orbit, launched on a Saturn IB rocket. AS-204 was to test launch operations, ground tracking and control facilities and the performance of the Apollo-Saturn launch assembly and would have lasted up to two weeks, depending on how the spacecraft performed.

The CSM for this flight, number 012 built by North American Aviation (NAA), was a Block I version designed before the lunar orbit rendezvous landing strategy was chosen; therefore it lacked the capability of docking with the lunar module. This was incorporated into the Block II CSM design, along with lessons learned in Block I. Block II would be test-flown with the LM when the latter was ready.

Director of Flight Crew Operations Deke Slayton selected the first Apollo crew in January 1966, with Grissom as Command Pilot, White as Senior Pilot, and rookie Donn F. Eisele as Pilot. Eisele dislocated his shoulder twice aboard the KC-135 weightlessness training aircraft, and had to undergo surgery on January 27. Slayton replaced him with Chaffee, and NASA announced the crew selection on March 21, 1966. James McDivitt, David Scott and Russell Schweickart were named as the backup crew.

On September 29, Walter Schirra, Eisele, and Walter Cunningham were named as the prime crew for a second Block I CSM flight, AS-205. NASA planned to follow this with an uncrewed test flight of the LM (AS-206), then the third crewed mission would be a dual flight designated AS-278 (or AS-207/208), in which AS-207 would launch the first crewed Block II CSM, which would then rendezvous and dock with the LM launched uncrewed on AS-208.

In March, NASA was studying the possibility of flying the first Apollo mission as a joint space rendezvous with the final Project Gemini mission, Gemini 12 in November 1966. But by May, delays in making Apollo ready for flight just by itself, and the extra time needed to incorporate compatibility with the Gemini, made that impractical. This became moot when slippage in readiness of the AS-204 spacecraft caused the last-quarter 1966 target date to be missed, and the mission was rescheduled for February 21, 1967.

== Mission background ==
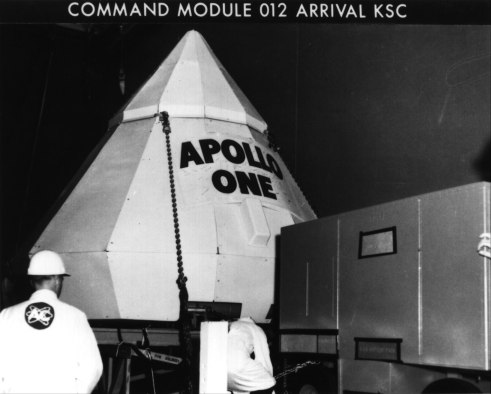
Command module 012, labeled Apollo One, arrives at Kennedy Space Center on August 26, 1966.

In October 1966, NASA announced the flight would carry a small television camera to broadcast live from the command module. The camera would also be used to allow flight controllers to monitor the spacecraft's instrument panel in flight. Television cameras were carried aboard all crewed Apollo missions.

=== Insignia ===
Grissom's crew received approval in June 1966 to design a mission patch with the name Apollo 1 (though the approval was subsequently withdrawn pending a final decision on the mission designation, which was not resolved until after the fire). The design's center depicts a command and service module flying over the southeastern United States with Florida (the launch point) prominent. The Moon is seen in the distance, symbolic of the eventual program goal. A yellow border carries the mission and astronaut names with another border set with stars and stripes, trimmed in gold. The insignia was designed by the crew, with the artwork done by North American Aviation employee Allen Stevens.

=== Spacecraft and crew preparation ===
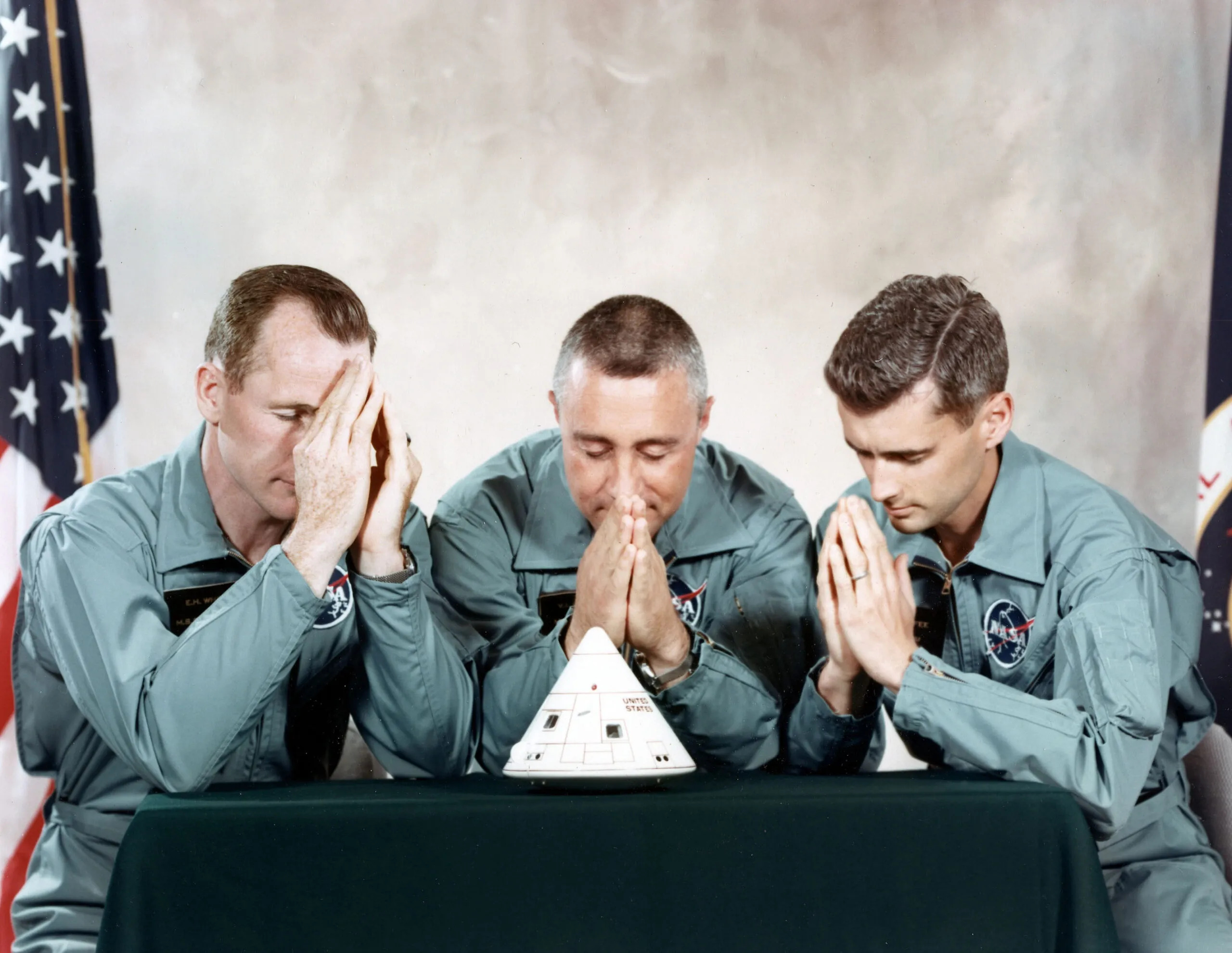
The Apollo 1 crew expressed their concerns about their spacecraft's problems by presenting this parody of their crew portrait to ASPO manager Joseph Shea on August 19, 1966.

The Apollo command and service module was much bigger and far more complex than any previous crewed spacecraft. In October 1963, Joseph F. Shea was named Apollo Spacecraft Program Office (ASPO) manager, responsible for managing the design and construction of both the CSM and the LM. In a spacecraft review meeting held with Shea on August 19, 1966 (a week before delivery), the crew expressed concern about the amount of flammable material (mainly nylon netting and Velcro) in the cabin, which both astronauts and technicians found convenient for holding tools and equipment in place. Although Shea gave the spacecraft a passing grade, after the meeting they gave him a crew portrait they had posed with heads bowed and hands clasped in prayer, with the inscription:

It isn't that we don't trust you, Joe, but this time we've decided to go over your head.

Shea gave his staff orders to tell North American to remove the flammables from the cabin, but did not supervise the issue personally.

North American shipped spacecraft CM-012 to Kennedy Space Center (KSC) on August 26, 1966, under a conditional Certificate of Flight Worthiness: 113 significant incomplete planned engineering changes had to be completed at KSC. That was not all; an additional 623 engineering change orders were made and completed after delivery. Grissom became so frustrated with the inability of the training simulator engineers to keep up with the spacecraft changes that he took a lemon from a tree by his house and hung it on the simulator.

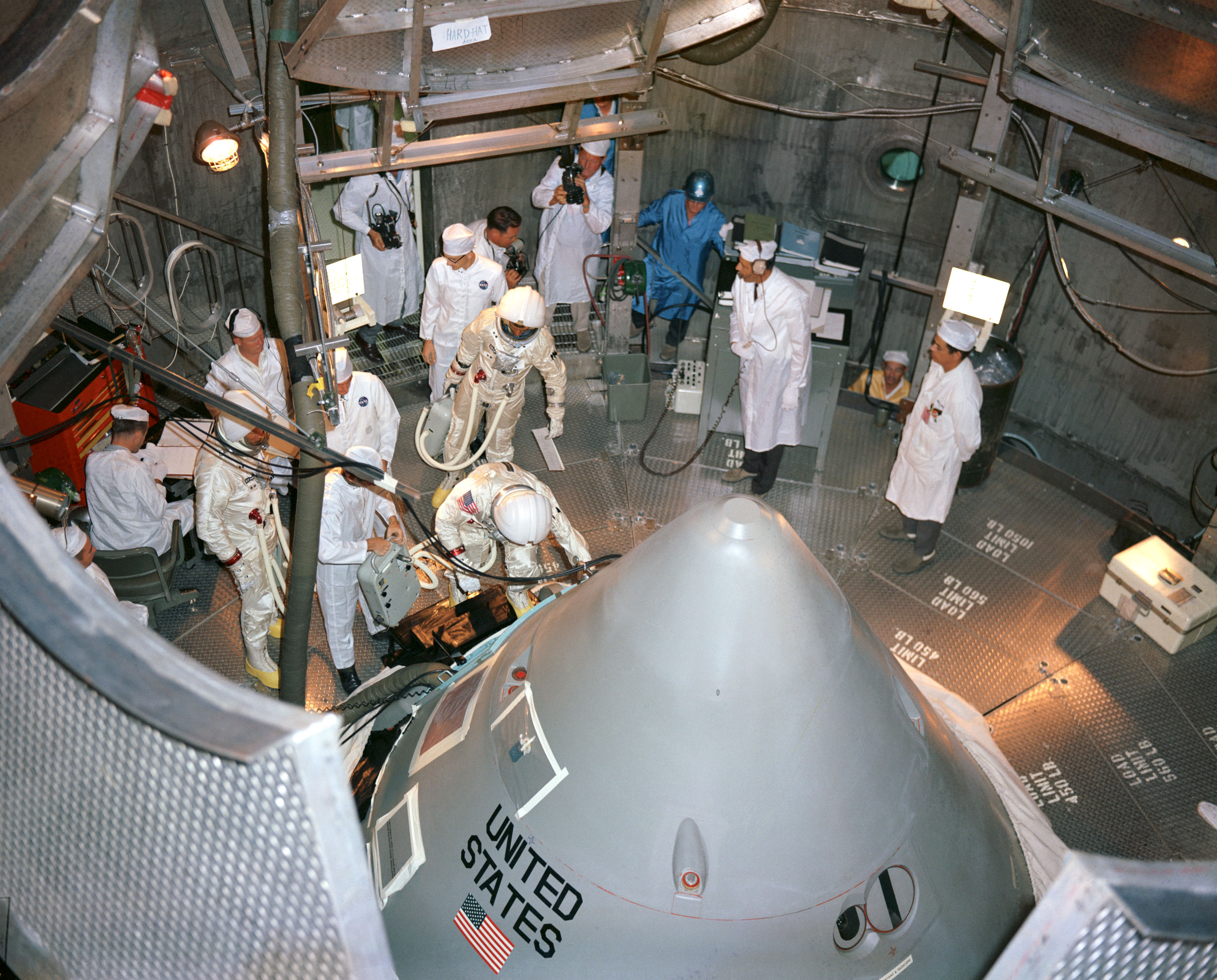
Apollo 1 crewmen enter their spacecraft in the altitude chamber at Kennedy Space Center, October 18, 1966.

The command and service modules were mated in the KSC altitude chamber in September, and combined system testing was performed. Altitude testing was performed first uncrewed, then with both the prime and backup crews, from October 10 through December 30. During this testing, the environmental control unit in the command module was found to have a design flaw, and was sent back to the manufacturer for design changes and rework. The returned ECU then leaked water/glycol coolant, and had to be returned a second time. Also during this time, a propellant tank in another service module had ruptured during testing at NAA, prompting the removal from the KSC test chamber of the service module so it could be tested for signs of the tank problem. These tests were negative.

In December the second Block I flight AS-205 was canceled as unnecessary; Schirra, Eisele and Cunningham were reassigned as the backup crew for Apollo 1. McDivitt's crew was now promoted to prime crew of the Block II/LM mission, re-designated AS-258 because the AS-205 launch vehicle would be used in place of AS-207. A third crewed mission was planned to launch the CSM and LM together on a Saturn V (AS-503) to an elliptical medium Earth orbit (MEO), to be crewed by Frank Borman, Michael Collins and William Anders. McDivitt, Scott and Schweickart had started their training for AS-258 in CM-101 at the NAA plant in Downey, California, when the Apollo 1 accident occurred.

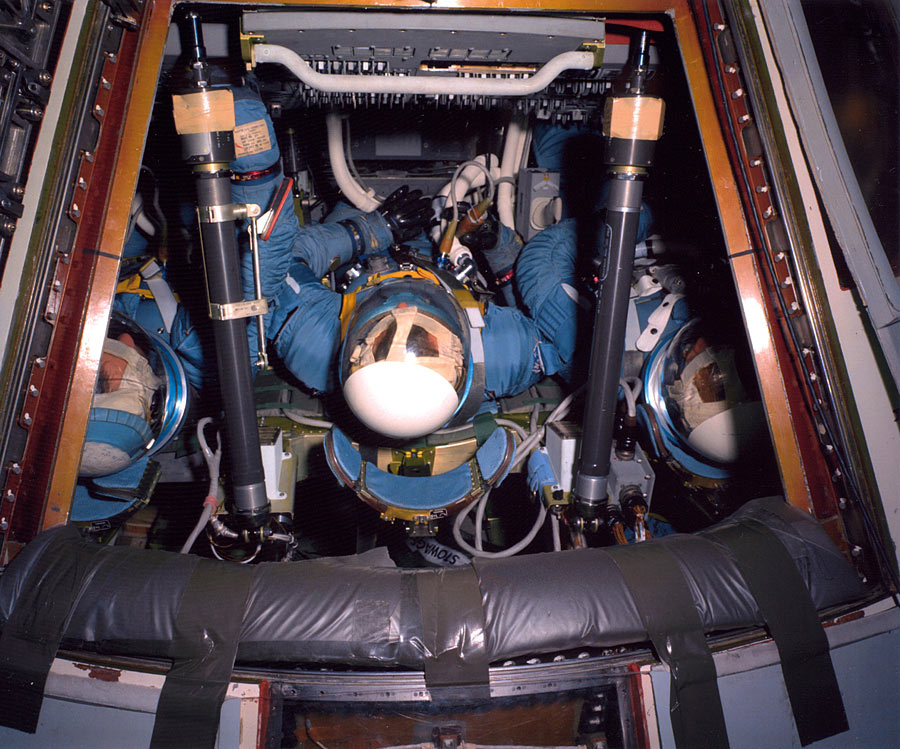
McDivitt, Scott and Schweickart training for the second Apollo mission on January 26, 1967, in the first Block II command module, wearing early blue versions of the Block II pressure suit.

Once all outstanding CSM-012 hardware problems had been fixed, the reassembled spacecraft completed a successful altitude chamber test with Schirra's backup crew on December 30. According to the final report of the accident investigation board, "At the post-test debriefing the backup flight crew expressed their satisfaction with the condition and performance of the spacecraft." This would appear to contradict the account given in the 1994 book Lost Moon: The Perilous Voyage of Apollo 13 by Jeffrey Kluger and astronaut James Lovell, that "When the trio climbed out of the ship, ... Schirra made it clear that he was not pleased with what he had seen," and that he later warned Grissom and Shea that "there's nothing wrong with this ship that I can point to, but it just makes me uncomfortable. Something about it just doesn't ring right," and that Grissom should get out at the first sign of trouble.

After the successful altitude tests, the spacecraft was removed from the altitude chamber on January 3, 1967, and mated to its Saturn IB launch vehicle on pad 34 on January 6.

Grissom said in a February 1963 interview that NASA could not eliminate risk despite precautions:

An awful lot of people have devoted more effort than I can describe to [make] Project Mercury and its successors, as safe as humanly possible ... But we also recognize that there remains a great deal of risk, especially in initial operations, regardless of planning. You just can't forecast all the things that could happen, or when they could happen.

"I suppose that someday we are going to have a failure. In every other business there are failures, and they are bound to happen sooner or later", he added. Grissom was asked about the fear of potential catastrophe in a December 1966 interview:

You sort of have to put that out of your mind. There's always a possibility that you can have a catastrophic failure, of course; this can happen on any flight; it can happen on the last one as well as the first one. So, you just plan as best you can to take care of all these eventualities, and you get a well-trained crew and you go fly.

== Accident ==
=== Plugs-out test ===
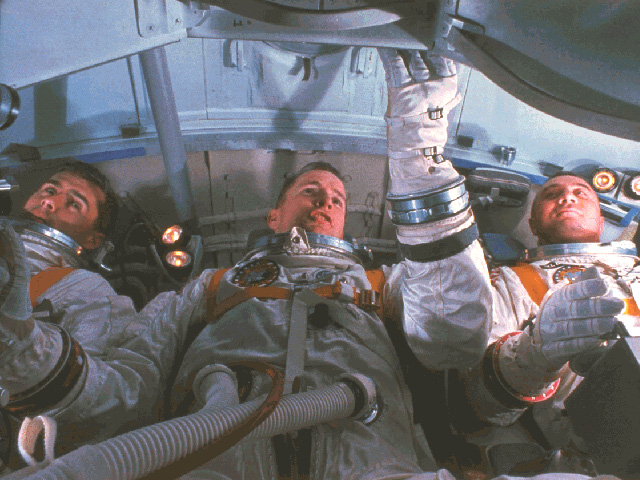
Chaffee, White, and Grissom training in a simulator of their command module cabin, January 19, 1967

The launch simulation on January 27, 1967, on pad 34, was a "plugs-out" test to determine whether the spacecraft would operate nominally on (simulated) internal power while detached from all cables and umbilicals. Passing this test was essential to making the February 21 launch date. The test was considered non-hazardous because neither the launch vehicle nor the spacecraft was loaded with fuel or cryogenics and all pyrotechnic systems (explosive bolts) were disabled.

At 1:00 pm EST (18:00 GMT) on January 27, first Grissom, then Chaffee, and White entered the command module fully pressure-suited, and were strapped into their seats and hooked up to the spacecraft's oxygen and communication systems. Grissom immediately noticed a strange odor in the air circulating through his suit which he compared to "sour buttermilk", and the simulated countdown was put on hold at 1:20 pm, while air samples were taken. The odor's cause was not found, and the countdown was resumed at 2:42 pm. The accident investigation found this odor to be unrelated to the fire.

Three minutes after the count was resumed the hatch installation was started. The hatch consisted of three parts: a removable inner hatch which stayed inside the cabin; a hinged outer hatch which was part of the spacecraft's heat shield; and an outer hatch cover which was part of the boost protective cover enveloping the entire command module to protect it from aerodynamic heating during launch and from launch escape rocket exhaust in the event of a launch abort. The boost hatch cover was partially, but not fully, latched in place because the flexible boost protective cover was slightly distorted by some cabling run under it to provide the simulated internal power (the spacecraft's fuel cell reactants were not loaded for this test). After the hatches were sealed, the air in the cabin was replaced with pure oxygen at 16.7 psi (115 kPa), 2 psi (14 kPa) higher than atmospheric pressure.

Movement by the astronauts was detected by the spacecraft's inertial measurement unit and the astronauts' biomedical sensors, and also indicated by increases in oxygen spacesuit flow, and sounds from Grissom's stuck-open microphone. The stuck microphone was part of a problem with the communications loop connecting the crew, the Operations and Checkout Building, and the Complex 34 blockhouse control room. The poor communications led Grissom to remark: "How are we going to get to the Moon if we can't talk between two or three buildings?"

The simulated countdown was put on hold again at 5:40 pm while attempts were made to troubleshoot the communications problem. All countdown functions up to the simulated internal power transfer had been successfully completed by 6:20 pm, and at 6:30 the count remained on hold at T minus 10 minutes.

=== Fire ===
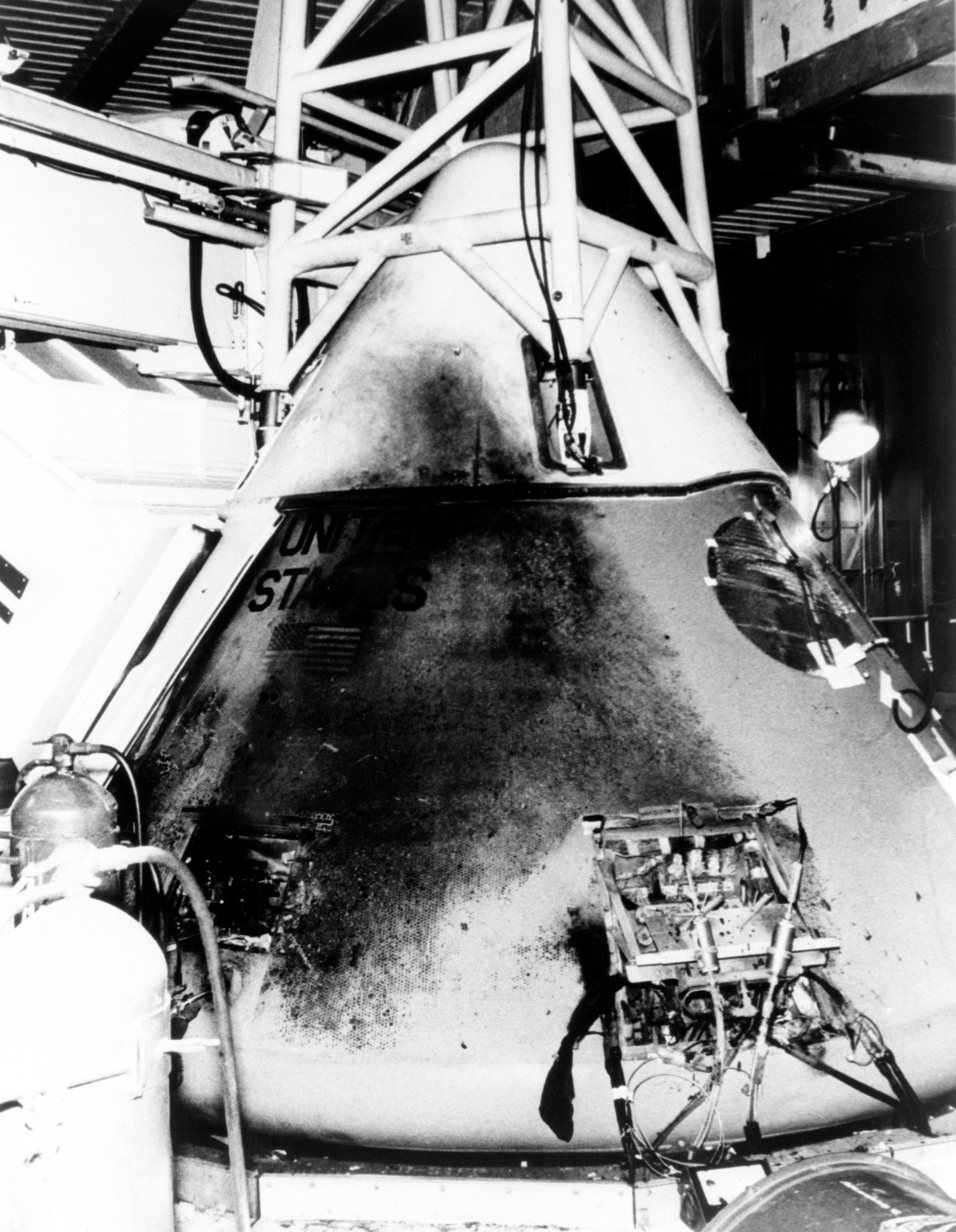
Command module exterior, blackened from the eruption of fire

Audio recording from the ground loop, starting from Grissom's "talk between buildings" remark. The first mention of fire is heard at 1:05.

The crew members were using the time to run through their checklist again, when a momentary increase in AC Bus 2 voltage occurred. Nine seconds later (at 6:31:04.7), one of the astronauts (some listeners and laboratory analysis indicate Grissom) exclaimed "Hey!", "Fire!", or "Flame!"; this was followed by two seconds of scuffling sounds through Grissom's open microphone. This was immediately followed at 6:31:06.2 (23:31:06.2 GMT) by someone (believed by most listeners, and supported by laboratory analysis, to be Chaffee) saying, "[I've / We've] got a fire in the cockpit." After 6.8 seconds of silence, a second, badly garbled transmission was heard by various listeners (who believed this transmission was made by Chaffee) as:

- "They're fighting a bad fire—Let's get out ... Open 'er up",
- "We've got a bad fire—Let's get out ... We're burning up", or
- "I'm reporting a bad fire ... I'm getting out ..."

The transmission lasted 5.0 seconds and ended with a cry of pain.

Some blockhouse witnesses said that they saw White on the television monitors, reaching for the inner hatch release handle as flames in the cabin spread from left to right.

The heat of the fire fed by pure oxygen caused the pressure to rise to 29 psi (200 kPa), which ruptured the command module's inner wall at 6:31:19 (23:31:19 GMT, initial phase of the fire). Flames and gases then rushed outside the command module through open access panels to two levels of the pad service structure. The intense heat, dense smoke, and ineffective gas masks designed for toxic fumes rather than smoke, hampered the ground crew's attempts to rescue the men. There were fears the command module had exploded, or soon would, and that the fire might ignite the solid fuel rocket in the launch escape tower above the command module, which would have likely killed nearby ground personnel, and possibly have destroyed the pad.

As the pressure was released by the cabin rupture, the rush of gases within the module caused flames to spread across the cabin, beginning the second phase. The third phase began when most of the oxygen was consumed and was replaced with atmospheric air, essentially quenching the fire, but causing high concentrations of carbon monoxide and heavy smoke to fill the cabin, and large amounts of soot to be deposited on surfaces as they cooled.

It took five minutes for the pad workers to open all three hatch layers, and they could not drop the inner hatch to the cabin floor as intended, so they pushed it out of the way to one side. Although the cabin lights remained on, they were unable to see the astronauts through the dense smoke. As the smoke cleared they found the bodies, but were not able to remove them. The fire had partly melted Grissom's and White's nylon space suits and the hoses connecting them to the life support system. Grissom had removed his restraints and was lying on the floor of the spacecraft. White's restraints were burned through, and he was found lying sideways just below the hatch. It was determined that he had tried to open the hatch per the emergency procedure, but was not able to do so against the internal pressure. Chaffee was found strapped into his right-hand seat, as procedure called for him to maintain communication until White opened the hatch. Because of the large strands of melted nylon fusing the astronauts to the cabin interior, removing the bodies took nearly 90 minutes. The bodies were only able to be removed after 7.5 hours from the time the incident took place, due to the gases and toxins present which prevented medical personnel from entering initially.

Deke Slayton was possibly the first NASA official to examine the spacecraft's interior. His testimony contradicted the official report concerning the position of Grissom's body. Slayton said of Grissom and White's bodies, "it is very difficult for me to determine the exact relationships of these two bodies. They were sort of jumbled together, and I couldn't really tell which head even belonged to which body at that point. I guess the only thing that was real obvious is that both bodies were at the lower edge of the hatch. They were not in the seats. They were almost completely clear of the seat areas."

== Investigation ==
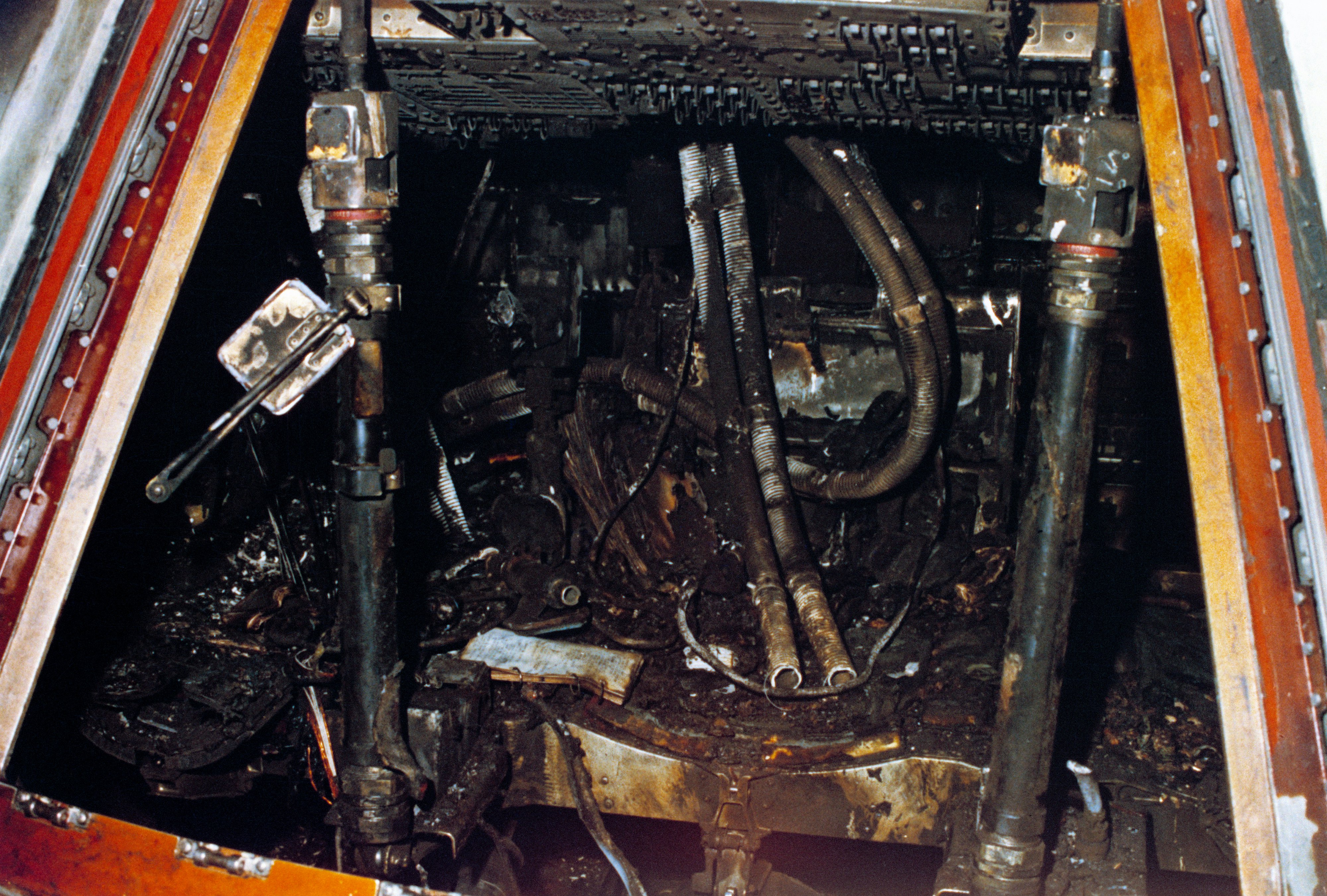
Charred remains of the Apollo 1 cabin interior

As a result of the in-flight failure of the Gemini 8 mission on March 17, 1966, NASA Deputy Administrator Robert Seamans wrote and implemented Management Instruction 8621.1 on April 14, 1966, defining Mission Failure Investigation Policy And Procedures. This modified NASA's existing accident procedures, based on military aircraft accident investigation, by giving the Deputy Administrator the option of performing independent investigations of major failures, beyond those for which the various Program Office officials were normally responsible. It declared, "It is NASA policy to investigate and document the causes of all major mission failures which occur in the conduct of its space and aeronautical activities and to take appropriate corrective actions as a result of the findings and recommendations."

Immediately after the fire NASA Administrator James E. Webb asked President Lyndon B. Johnson to allow NASA to handle the investigation according to its established procedure, promising to be truthful in assessing blame, and to keep the appropriate leaders of Congress informed. Deputy Administrator Seamans then ordered the establishment of the Apollo 204 Review Board chaired by Langley Research Center director Floyd L. Thompson, which included astronaut Frank Borman, spacecraft designer Maxime Faget, and six others. On February 1, Cornell University professor Frank A. Long left the board, and was replaced by Robert W. Van Dolah of the U.S. Bureau of Mines. The next day North American's chief engineer for Apollo, George Jeffs, resigned as well.

Seamans ordered all Apollo 1 hardware and software impounded, to be released only under control of the board. After thorough stereo photographic documentation of the CM-012 interior, the board ordered its disassembly using procedures tested by disassembling the identical CM-014 and conducted a thorough investigation of every part. The board reviewed the astronauts' autopsy results and interviewed witnesses. Seamans sent Webb weekly status reports of the investigation's progress, and the board issued its final report on April 5, 1967.

=== Cause of death ===
The autopsy report determined that the primary cause of death for all three astronauts was cardiac arrest caused by high concentrations of carbon monoxide. Asphyxiation occurred after the fire melted the astronauts' suits and oxygen tubes, exposing them to the lethal atmosphere of the cabin.

According to the Board, Grissom suffered severe third-degree burns on more than one-third of his body and his spacesuit was almost completely destroyed. White suffered third-degree burns on almost half of his body and a quarter of his spacesuit had melted away. Chaffee suffered third-degree burns on almost a quarter of his body and a small portion of his spacesuit was damaged. Burns suffered by the crew were not believed to be major factors, and it was concluded that most of them had occurred postmortem.

=== Major causes of accident ===
The review board identified several major factors which combined to cause the fire and the astronauts' deaths:

- An ignition source most probably related to "vulnerable wiring carrying spacecraft power" and "vulnerable plumbing carrying a combustible and corrosive coolant"
- A pure oxygen atmosphere at higher than atmospheric pressure
- A cabin sealed with a hatch cover which could not be quickly removed at high pressure
- An extensive distribution of combustible materials in the cabin
- Inadequate emergency preparedness (rescue or medical assistance, and crew escape)

==== Ignition source ====
The review board determined that the electrical power momentarily failed at 23:30:55 GMT, and found evidence of several electric arcs in the interior equipment. They were unable to conclusively identify a single ignition source. They determined that the fire most likely started near the floor in the lower left section of the cabin, close to the Environmental Control Unit. It spread from the left wall of the cabin to the right, with the floor being affected only briefly.

The board noted that a silver-plated copper wire, running through an environmental control unit near the center couch, had become stripped of its Teflon insulation and abraded by repeated opening and closing of a small access door. (Note: In 1967 a vice president of North American Aviation, John McCarthy, speculated that Grissom had accidentally "scuffed the insulation of a wire" while moving about the spacecraft, but his remarks were ignored by the review board and strongly rejected by a congressional committee. Frank Borman, who had been the first astronaut to go inside the burned spacecraft, testified, "We found no evidence to support the thesis that Gus, or any of the crew members kicked the wire that ignited the flammables." A 1978 history of the accident written internally by NASA said at the time, "This theory that a scuffed wire caused the spark that led to the fire still has wide currency at Kennedy Space Center. Men differ, however, on the cause of the scuff." Soon after making his comment McCarthy had said, "I only brought it up as a hypothesis.")

This weak point in the wiring ran near a junction in an ethylene glycol/water cooling line that had been prone to leaks. Electrolysis of ethylene glycol solution with the silver anode of the wire was discovered at the Manned Spacecraft Center on May 29, 1967, to be a hazard capable of causing a violent exothermic reaction, igniting the ethylene glycol mixture in the Command Module's pure oxygen atmosphere. Experiments at the Illinois Institute of Technology confirmed the hazard existed for silver-plated wires, but not for copper-only or nickel-plated copper. In July, ASPO directed both North American and Grumman to ensure no silver or silver-coated electrical contacts existed in the vicinity of possible glycol spills in the Apollo spacecraft.

==== Pure oxygen atmosphere ====
The plugs-out test had been run to simulate the launch procedure, with the cabin pressurized with pure oxygen at the nominal launch level of 16.7 psi (115 kPa), 2 psi (14 kPa) above standard sea level atmospheric pressure. This is more than five times the 3 psi (21 kPa) partial pressure of oxygen in the atmosphere, and provides an environment in which materials not normally considered flammable will be highly flammable and burst into flame.

The high-pressure oxygen atmosphere was similar to that which had been used successfully in the Mercury and Gemini programs. The pressure before launch was deliberately greater than ambient in order to drive out the nitrogen-containing air and replace it with pure oxygen, and also to seal the plug door hatch cover. During the launch, the pressure would have been gradually reduced to the in-flight level of 5 psi (34 kPa), providing sufficient oxygen for the astronauts to breathe while reducing the fire risk. The Apollo 1 crew had successfully tested this procedure with their spacecraft in the Operations and Checkout Building altitude (vacuum) chamber on October 18 and 19, 1966, and the backup crew of Schirra, Eisele and Cunningham had repeated it on December 30. The investigation board noted that, during these tests, the command module had been fully pressurized with pure oxygen four times, for a total of six hours and fifteen minutes, two and a half hours longer than it had been during the plugs-out test. (Note: The report mistakenly says "about 2 1/2 times longer", which is clearly incorrect because the cabin had been pressurized for about 3 3/4 hours during the plugs-out test.)

==== Flammable materials in the cabin ====
The review board cited "many types and classes of combustible material" close to ignition sources. The NASA crew systems department had installed 34 square feet (3.2 m^{2}) of Velcro throughout the spacecraft, almost like carpeting. This Velcro was found to be flammable in a high-pressure 100% oxygen environment. Astronaut Buzz Aldrin states in his 1989 book Men From Earth that the flammable material had been removed per the crew's August 19 complaints and Joseph Shea's order, but was replaced before the August 26 delivery to Cape Kennedy.

==== Hatch design ====
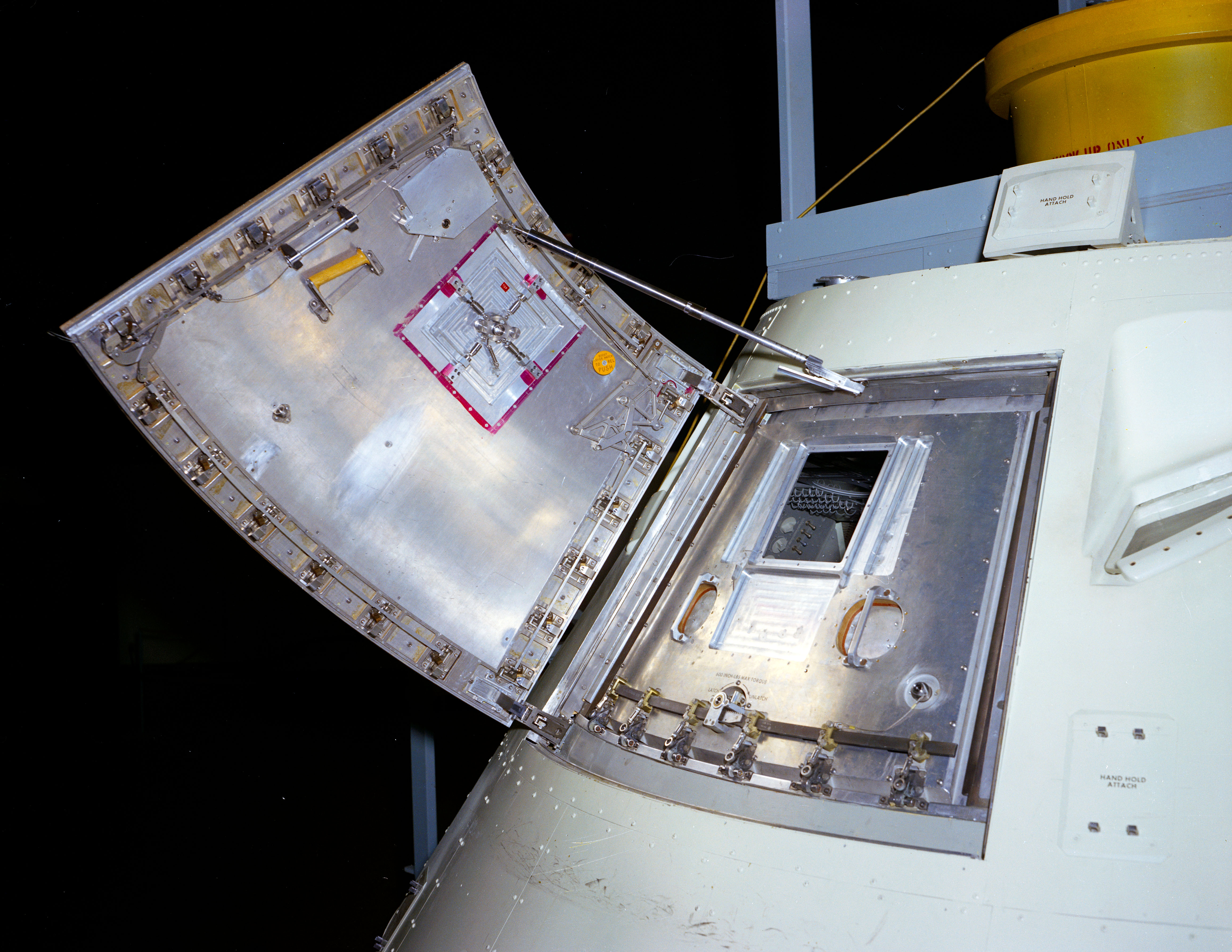
The Block I hatch, as used on Apollo 1, consisted of two pieces, and required pressure inside the cabin to be no greater than atmospheric in order to open. A third outer layer, the boost protective hatch cover, is not shown.

The inner hatch cover used a plug door design, sealed by higher pressure inside the cabin than outside. The normal pressure level used for launch (2 psi (14 kPa) above ambient) created sufficient force to prevent removing the cover until the excess pressure was vented. Emergency procedure called for Grissom to open the cabin vent valve first, allowing White to remove the cover, but Grissom was prevented from doing this because the valve was located to the left, behind the initial wall of flames. Also, while the system could easily vent the normal pressure, its flow capacity was utterly incapable of handling the rapid increase to 29 psi (200 kPa) caused by the intense heat of the fire.

North American had originally suggested the hatch open outward and use explosive bolts to blow the hatch in case of emergency, as had been done in Project Mercury. NASA did not agree, arguing the hatch could accidentally open, as it had on Grissom's Liberty Bell 7 flight, so the Manned Spacecraft Center designers rejected the explosive design in favor of a mechanically operated one for the Gemini and Apollo programs. Before the fire, the Apollo astronauts had recommended changing the design to an outward-opening hatch, and this was already slated for inclusion in the Block II command module design. According to Slayton's testimony before the House investigation of the accident, this was based on ease of exit for spacewalks and at the end of flight, rather than for emergency exit.

==== Emergency preparedness ====
The board noted that the test planners had failed to identify the test as hazardous; emergency equipment (such as gas masks) were inadequate to handle this type of fire; that fire, rescue, and medical teams were not in attendance; and that the spacecraft work and access areas contained many hindrances to emergency response such as steps, sliding doors, and sharp turns.

== Choice of pure oxygen atmosphere ==
Test By Fire (1967) Official NASA Apollo 1 accident evaluation film reel.

When designing the Mercury spacecraft, NASA had considered using a nitrogen/oxygen mixture to reduce the fire risk near launch, but rejected it based on a number of considerations. First, a pure oxygen atmosphere is comfortably breathable by humans at 5 psi (34 kPa), greatly reducing the pressure load on the spacecraft in the vacuum of space. Second, nitrogen used with the in-flight pressure reduction carried the risk of decompression sickness (known as "the bends"). But the decision to eliminate the use of any gas but oxygen was criticized when a serious accident occurred on April 21, 1960, in which McDonnell Aircraft test pilot G. B. North passed out and was seriously injured when testing a Mercury cabin/spacesuit atmosphere system in a vacuum chamber. The problem was found to be nitrogen-rich (oxygen-poor) air leaking from the cabin into his spacesuit feed. North American Aviation had suggested using an oxygen/nitrogen mixture for Apollo, but NASA overruled this. The pure oxygen design was judged to be safer, less complicated, and lighter in weight. In his monograph Project Apollo: The Tough Decisions, Deputy Administrator Seamans wrote that NASA's worst mistake in engineering judgment was not running a fire test on the command module before the plugs-out test. In the first episode of the 2009 BBC documentary series NASA: Triumph and Tragedy, astronaut Jim McDivitt said that NASA had no idea how a 100% oxygen atmosphere would influence burning. Similar remarks by other astronauts were expressed in the 2007 documentary film In the Shadow of the Moon.

=== Other oxygen incidents ===
Fires in high-oxygen test environments had occurred before the Apollo fire. In 1962, USAF Colonel B. Dean Smith was conducting a test of the Gemini space suit with a colleague in a pure oxygen chamber at Brooks Air Force Base in San Antonio, Texas, when a fire broke out, destroying the chamber. Smith and his partner narrowly escaped. On November 17, 1962, a fire broke out in a chamber at the Navy's Air Crew Equipment Laboratory during a pure oxygen test. The fire started when a faulty ground wire arced onto insulation. After attempts to extinguish the fire by smothering it, the crew escaped the chamber with minor burns across large parts of their bodies. On February 16, 1965, United States Navy Divers Fred Jackson and John Youmans were killed in a decompression chamber fire at the Experimental Diving Unit in Washington, D.C., shortly after additional oxygen was added to the chamber's atmospheric mix.

In addition to fires with personnel present, the Apollo Environmental Control System experienced accidents from 1964 to 1966 due to hardware malfunctions. Notable is the April 28, 1966, fire, as the investigation found that new measures should be taken to avoid fires, including improved selection of materials, and that environmental control system (ECS) and Command Module circuits have a potential for arcing or short circuits.

Other oxygen fire occurrences are documented in reports archived in the National Air and Space Museum, including:

- Selection of Space Cabin Atmospheres. Part II: Fire and Blast Hazards [sic] in Space Cabins. (Emanuel M. Roth; Dept of Aeronautics Medicine and Bioastronautics, Lovelace Foundation for Medical Education and Research. c. 1964–1966)
- "Fire Prevention in Manned Spacecraft and Test Chamber Oxygen Atmospheres". (Manned Spacecraft Center. NASA General Working Paper 10 063. October 10, 1966)

Incidents had also occurred in the Soviet space program, but due to the Soviet government's policy of secrecy, these were not disclosed until well after the Apollo 1 fire. Cosmonaut Valentin Bondarenko died on March 23, 1961, from burns sustained in a fire while participating in a 15-day endurance experiment in a high-oxygen isolation chamber, less than three weeks before the first Vostok crewed space flight; this was disclosed on January 28, 1986.

During the Voskhod 2 mission in March 1965, cosmonauts Pavel Belyayev and Alexei Leonov could not completely seal the spacecraft hatch after Leonov's historic first walk in space. The spacecraft's environmental control system responded to the leaking air by adding more oxygen to the cabin, causing the concentration level to rise as high as 45%. The crew and ground controllers worried about the possibility of fire, remembering Bondarenko's death four years earlier.

On January 31, 1967, four days after the Apollo 1 fire, United States Air Force airmen William F. Bartley Jr. and Richard G. Harmon were killed in a flash fire while tending laboratory rabbits in the Two Man Space Environment Simulator, a pure oxygen chamber at the School of Aerospace Medicine at Brooks Air Force Base. Like the Apollo 1 fire, the School fire was caused by an electrical spark in a pure oxygen environment. The widows of the Apollo 1 crew sent condolence letters to Bartley's and Harmon's families.

== Political fallout ==
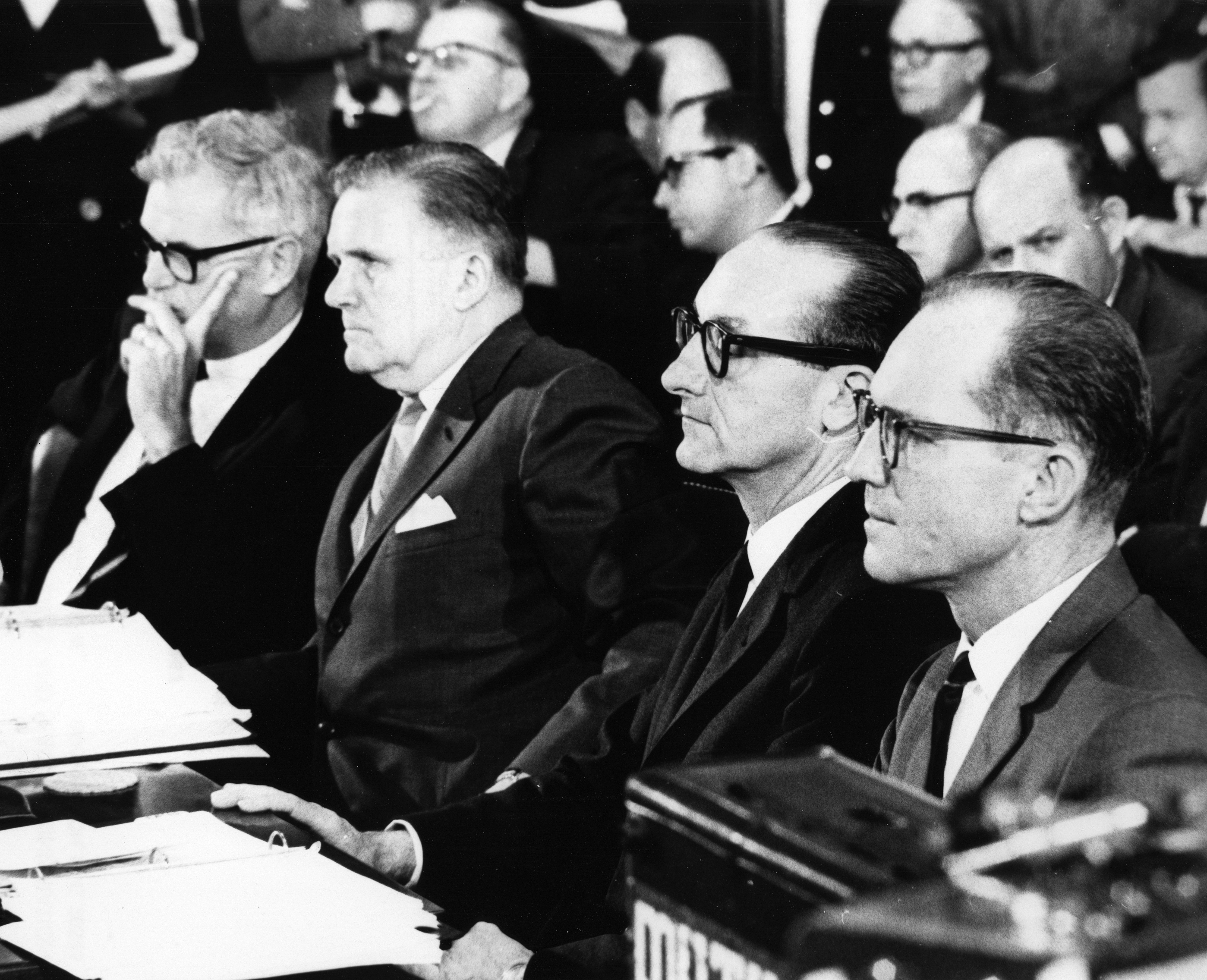
Deputy Administrator Seamans, Administrator Webb, Manned Space Flight Administrator George E. Mueller, and Apollo Program Director Phillips testify before a Senate hearing on the Apollo accident.

Committees in both houses of the United States Congress with oversight of the space program launched investigations, including the Senate Committee on Aeronautical and Space Sciences, chaired by Senator Clinton P. Anderson. Seamans, Webb, Manned Space Flight Administrator Dr. George E. Mueller, and Apollo Program Director Maj Gen Samuel C. Phillips testified before Anderson's committee.

In the February 27 hearing, Senator Walter F. Mondale asked Webb if he knew of a report of extraordinary problems with the performance of North American Aviation on the Apollo contract. Webb replied he did not, and deferred to his subordinates on the witness panel. Mueller and Phillips responded they too were unaware of any such report.

In late 1965, just over a year before the accident, Phillips had headed a "tiger team" investigating the causes of inadequate quality, schedule delays, and cost overruns in both the Apollo CSM and the Saturn V second stage (for which North American was also prime contractor). He gave an oral presentation (with transparencies) of his team's findings to Mueller and Seamans, and also presented them in a memo to North American president John L. Atwood, to which Mueller appended his own strongly worded memo to Atwood.

During Mondale's 1967 questioning about what became known as the "Phillips Report", Seamans was afraid Mondale might actually have seen a hard copy of Phillips' presentation, and responded that contractors have occasionally been subjected to on-site progress reviews; perhaps this was what Mondale's information referred to. Mondale continued to refer to "the Report" despite Phillips' refusal to characterize it as such, and, angered by what he perceived as Webb's deception and concealment of important program problems from Congress, he questioned NASA's selection of North American as prime contractor. Seamans later wrote that Webb roundly chastised him in the cab ride leaving the hearing, for volunteering information which led to the disclosure of Phillips' memo.

On May 11, Webb issued a statement defending NASA's November 1961 selection of North American as the prime contractor for Apollo. On June 9 Seamans filed a seven-page memorandum documenting the selection process. Webb eventually provided a controlled copy of Phillips' memo to Congress. The Senate committee noted in its final report NASA's testimony that "the findings of the [Phillips] task force had no effect on the accident, did not lead to the accident, and were not related to the accident", but stated in its recommendations:

Notwithstanding that in NASA's judgment the contractor later made significant progress in overcoming the problems, the committee believes it should have been informed of the situation. The committee does not object to the position of the Administrator of NASA, that all details of Government/contractor relationships should not be put in the public domain. However, that position in no way can be used as an argument for not bringing this or other serious situations to the attention of the committee.

Freshman Senators Edward W. Brooke III and Charles H. Percy jointly wrote an Additional Views section appended to the committee report, chastising NASA more strongly for not having disclosed the Phillips review to Congress. Mondale wrote his own, even more strongly worded Additional View, accusing NASA of "evasiveness, ... lack of candor, ... patronizing attitude toward Congress ... refusal to respond fully and forthrightly to legitimate Congressional inquiries, and ... solicitous concern for corporate sensitivities at a time of national tragedy".

The potential political threat to Apollo blew over, due in large part to the support of President Lyndon B. Johnson, who at the time still wielded a measure of influence with Congress from his own Senatorial experience. He was a staunch supporter of NASA since its inception, had even recommended the Moon program to President John F. Kennedy in 1961, and was skilled at portraying it as part of Kennedy's legacy.

Relations between NASA and North American deteriorated over assignment of blame. North American argued unsuccessfully it was not responsible for the fatal error in spacecraft atmosphere design. Finally, Webb demanded of Atwood that either he or Chief Engineer Harrison Storms resign. Atwood fired Storms.

On the NASA side, Joseph Shea resorted to barbiturates and alcohol. NASA administrator James Webb became increasingly worried about Shea's mental state. Shea was asked to take an extended voluntary leave of absence, but Shea refused, threatening to resign rather than take leave. As a compromise, he agreed to see a psychiatrist and to abide by an independent assessment of his psychological fitness. This approach to remove Shea from his position was also unsuccessful. Six months after the fire, Shea was reassigned to NASA headquarters in Washington, D.C. Feeling it was a "non-job," Shea left after two months.

== Program recovery ==
From this day forward, Flight Control will be known by two words: Tough and Competent. Tough means we are forever accountable for what we do or what we fail to do. We will never again compromise our responsibilities ... Competent means we will never take anything for granted ... Mission Control will be perfect. When you leave this meeting today you will go to your office and the first thing you will do there is to write Tough and Competent on your blackboards. It will never be erased. Each day when you enter the room, these words will remind you of the price paid by Grissom, White, and Chaffee. These words are the price of admission to the ranks of Mission Control.

— Gene Kranz, speech given to Mission Control after the accident.

Gene Kranz called a meeting of his staff in Mission Control three days after the accident, and delivered a speech which has become one of NASA's principles. Speaking of the errors and overall attitude surrounding the Apollo program before the accident, he said: "We were too 'gung-ho' about the schedule and we blocked out all of the problems we saw each day in our work. Every element of the program was in trouble and so were we." He reminded the team of the perils and mercilessness of their endeavor, and stated the new requirement that every member of every team in mission control be "tough and competent", requiring nothing less than perfection throughout NASA's programs. In 2003, following the Space Shuttle Columbia disaster, NASA administrator Sean O'Keefe quoted Kranz's speech, applying it to the Columbia crew.

=== Command module redesign ===
The Apollo program was grounded for review and redesign. The command module was found to be extremely hazardous and, in some instances, carelessly assembled (for example, a misplaced wrench socket was found in the cabin).

It was decided that the remaining Block I spacecraft would be used only for uncrewed Saturn V test flights. All crewed missions would use the Block II spacecraft, to which many command module design changes were made:

- The cabin atmosphere at launch was adjusted to 60% oxygen and 40% nitrogen at sea-level pressure: 14.7 psi (101 kPa). During ascent the cabin rapidly vented down to 5 psi (34 kPa), releasing approximately 2/3 of the gas present at launch. The environmental control system then maintained a nominal pressure of 5 psi (34 kPa) as the spacecraft continued into vacuum. The cabin was then very slowly purged (vented to space and simultaneously replaced with 100% oxygen), so that nitrogen concentration gradually fell to zero over the next day. Although the new cabin launch atmosphere was significantly safer than 100% oxygen, it still contained almost three times the oxygen present in sea-level air (20.9% oxygen). This ensured sufficient partial pressure of oxygen when the astronauts removed their helmets after reaching orbit. (60% of five psi is three psi, compared to 60% of 14.7 psi (101 kPa) which is 8.8 psi (61 kPa) at launch, and 20.9% of 14.7 psi (101 kPa) which is 3.07 psi (21.2 kPa) in sea-level air.)
- The 100 percent oxygen within the astronauts' pressure suits was not changed. The rapid drop in cabin (and suit) pressures during ascent made decompression sickness likely unless nitrogen was purged from the astronauts' tissues before launch. They would breathe pure oxygen, starting several hours before launch, until they removed their helmets in orbit. Avoiding the "bends" was considered worth the residual risk of an oxygen-accelerated fire within a suit.
- Nylon used in the Block I suits was replaced in the Block II suits with Beta cloth, a non-flammable, highly melt-resistant fabric woven from fiberglass and coated with Teflon.
- Block II had already been planned to use a completely redesigned hatch which opened outward, and could be opened in less than five seconds. Concerns of accidental opening were addressed by using a cartridge of pressurized nitrogen to drive the release mechanism in an emergency, instead of the explosive bolts used on Project Mercury.
- Flammable materials in the cabin were replaced with self-extinguishing versions.
- Plumbing and wiring were covered with protective insulation. Aluminum tubing was replaced with stainless steel tubing that used brazed joints when possible.

Thorough protocols were implemented for documenting spacecraft construction and maintenance.

=== New mission naming scheme ===
The astronauts' widows asked that Apollo 1 be reserved for the flight their husbands never made, and on April 24, 1967, Mueller, as Associate Administrator for Manned Space Flight, announced this change officially: AS-204 would be recorded as Apollo 1, "first manned Apollo Saturn flight – failed on ground test". Even though three uncrewed Apollo missions (AS-201, AS-202, and AS-203) had previously occurred, only AS-201 and AS-202 carried spacecraft. Therefore, the next mission, the first uncrewed Saturn V test flight (AS-501) would be designated Apollo 4, with all subsequent flights numbered sequentially in the order flown. The first three flights would not be renumbered, and the names Apollo 2 and Apollo 3 would officially go unused. Mueller considered AS-201 and AS-202, the first and second flights of the Apollo Block I CSM, as Apollo 2 and 3 respectively.

The crewed flight hiatus allowed work to catch up on the Saturn V and lunar module, which were encountering their own delays. Apollo 4 flew in November 1967. Apollo 1's (AS-204) Saturn IB rocket was taken down from Launch Complex 34, later reassembled at Launch complex 37B and used to launch Apollo 5, an uncrewed Earth orbital test flight of the first lunar module, LM-1, in January 1968. A second uncrewed Saturn V AS-502 flew as Apollo 6 in April 1968, and Grissom's backup crew of Wally Schirra, Don Eisele, and Walter Cunningham, flew the orbital test mission as Apollo 7 (AS-205), in a Block II CSM in October 1968.

== Memorials ==
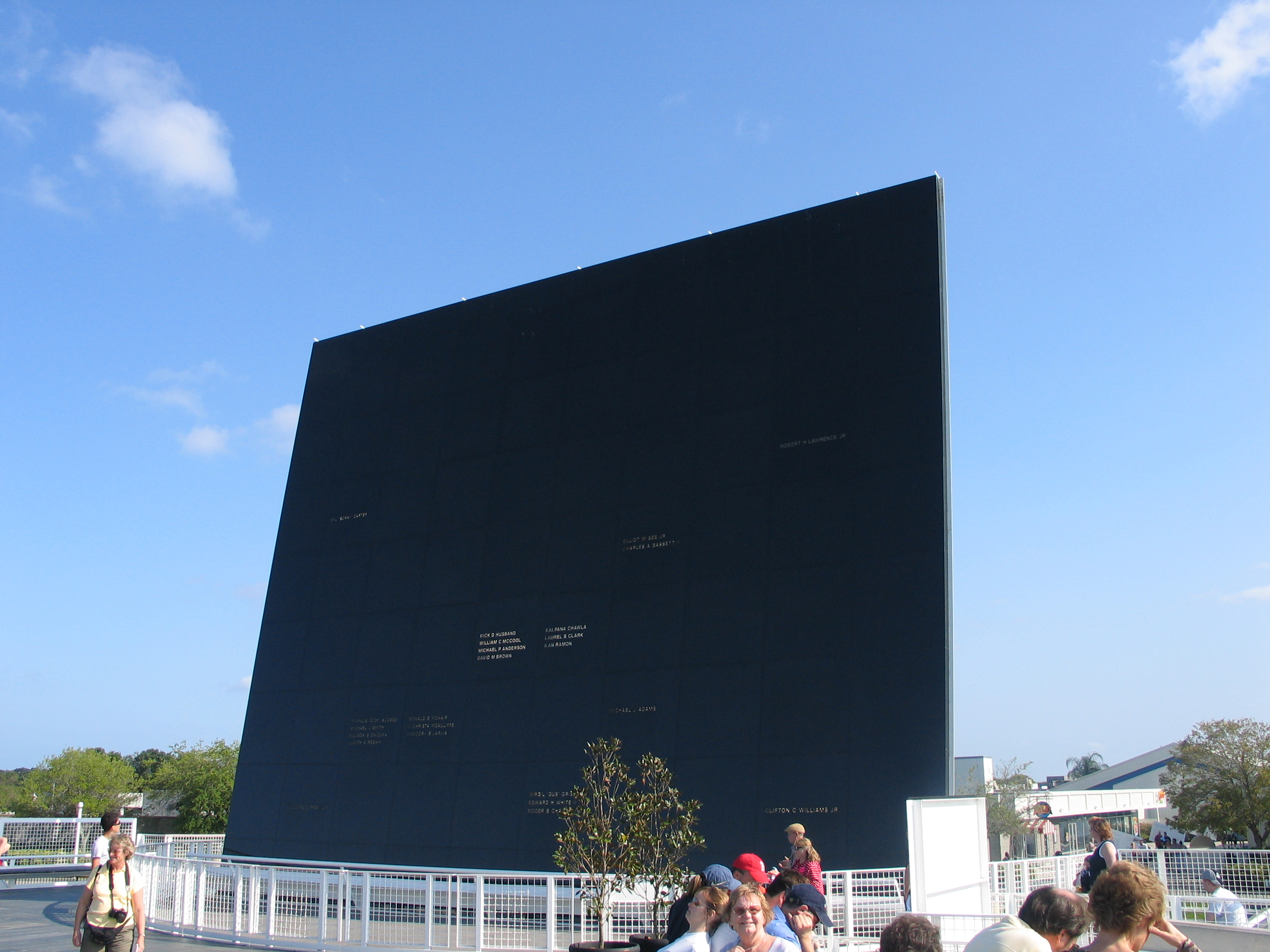
The Space Mirror Memorial at the Kennedy Space Center bears the names of Grissom, White, and Chaffee at the bottom middle.

Gus Grissom and Roger Chaffee were buried at Arlington National Cemetery. Ed White was buried at West Point Cemetery on the grounds of the United States Military Academy in West Point, New York. NASA officials attempted to pressure Pat White, Ed White's widow, into allowing her husband to be buried at Arlington, against what she knew to be his wishes; their efforts were foiled by astronaut Frank Borman. The names of the Apollo 1 crew are among those of multiple astronauts who have died in the line of duty, listed on the Space Mirror Memorial at the Kennedy Space Center Visitor Complex in Merritt Island, Florida. President Jimmy Carter awarded the Congressional Space Medal of Honor posthumously to Grissom on October 1, 1978. President Bill Clinton awarded it to White and Chaffee on December 17, 1997.

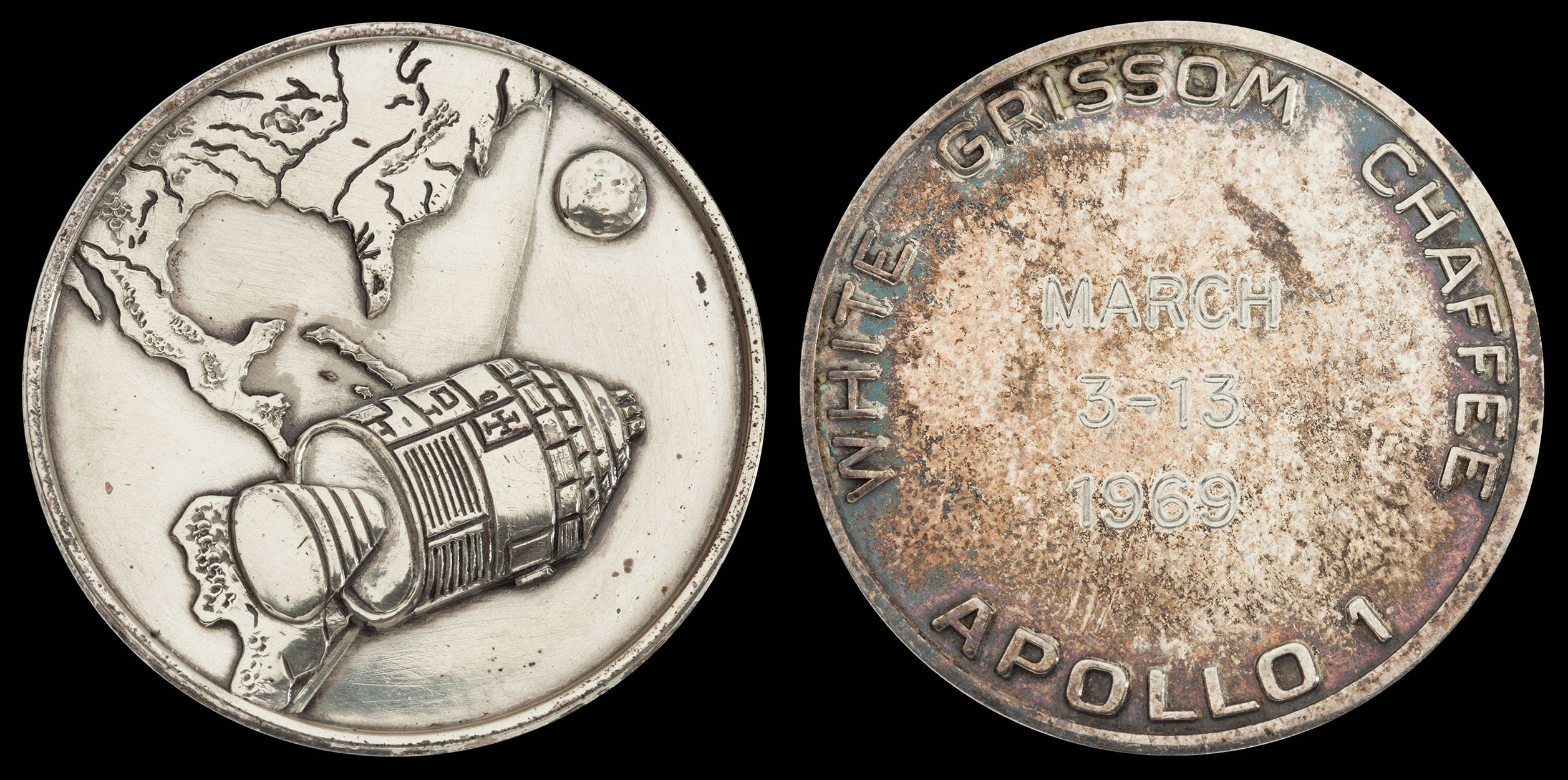
Apollo 1 medallion flown on Apollo 9 by Jim McDivitt

An Apollo 1 mission patch was left on the Moon's surface after the first crewed lunar landing by Apollo 11 crew members Neil Armstrong and Buzz Aldrin. The Apollo 15 mission left on the surface of the Moon a tiny memorial statue, Fallen Astronaut, along with a plaque containing the names of the Apollo 1 astronauts, among others including Soviet cosmonauts, who perished in the pursuit of human space flight.

=== Launch Complex 34 ===
After the Apollo 1 fire, Launch Complex 34 was subsequently used only for the launch of Apollo 7 and later dismantled down to the concrete launch pedestal, which remains at the site (28.52182°N 80.56126°W) along with a few other concrete and steel-reinforced structures. The pedestal bears two plaques commemorating the crew. The "Ad Astra per aspera" plaque for "the crew of Apollo 1" is seen in the 1998 film Armageddon. The "Dedicated to the living memory of the crew of the Apollo 1" plaque is quoted at the end of Wayne Hale's Requiem for the NASA Space Shuttle program. Each year the families of the Apollo 1 crew are invited to the site for a memorial, and the Kennedy Space Center Visitor Complex includes the site during the tour of the historic Cape Canaveral launch sites.

In January 2005, three granite benches, built by a college classmate of one of the astronauts, were installed at the site on the southern edge of the launch pad. Each bears the name of one of the astronauts and his military service insignia.

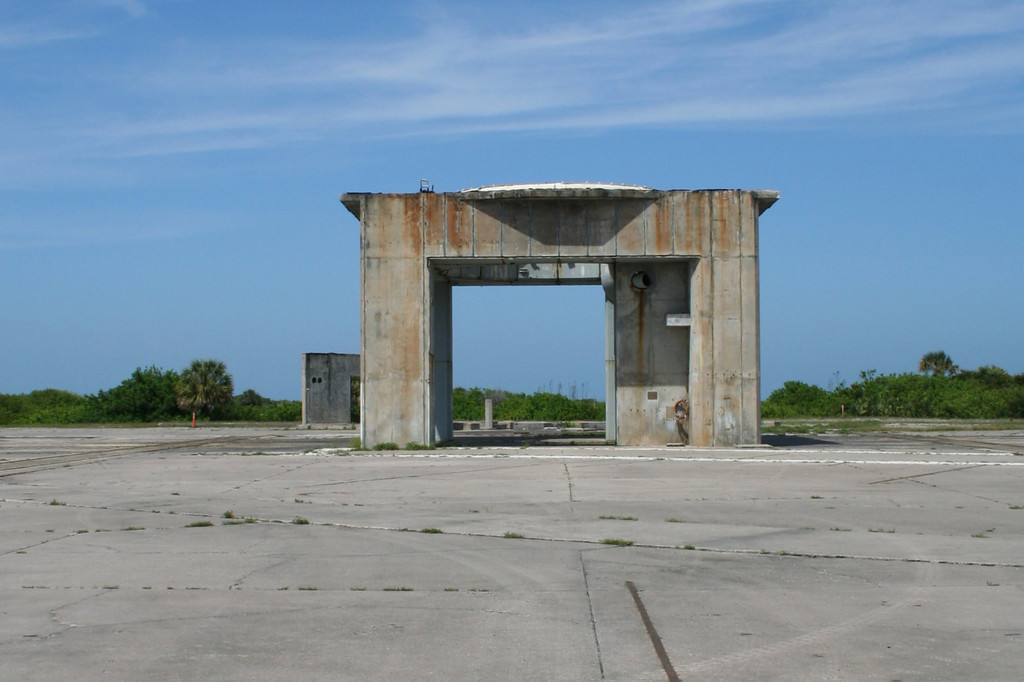
Launch pedestal, with dedication plaque on the rear of right post

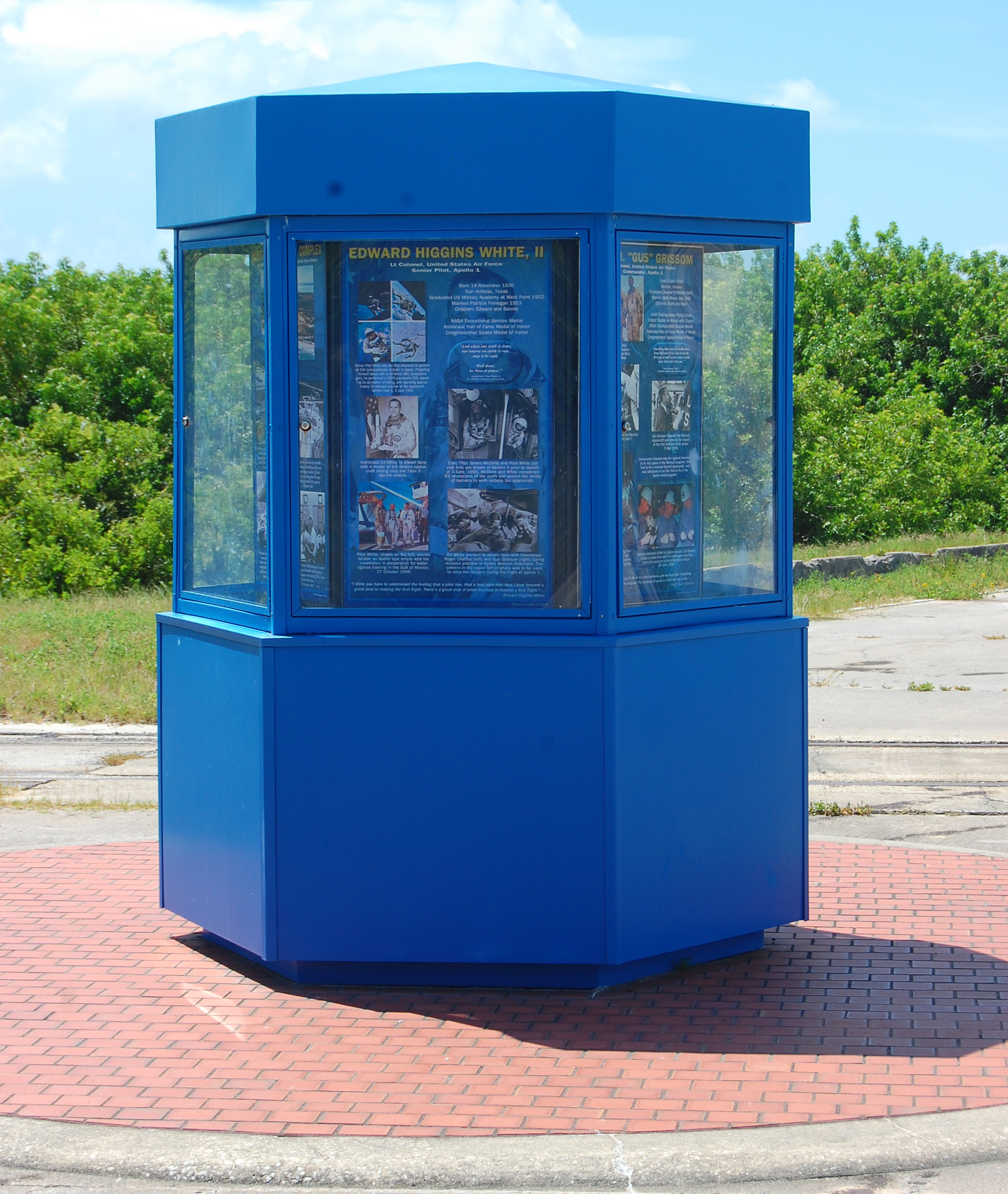
Memorial kiosk

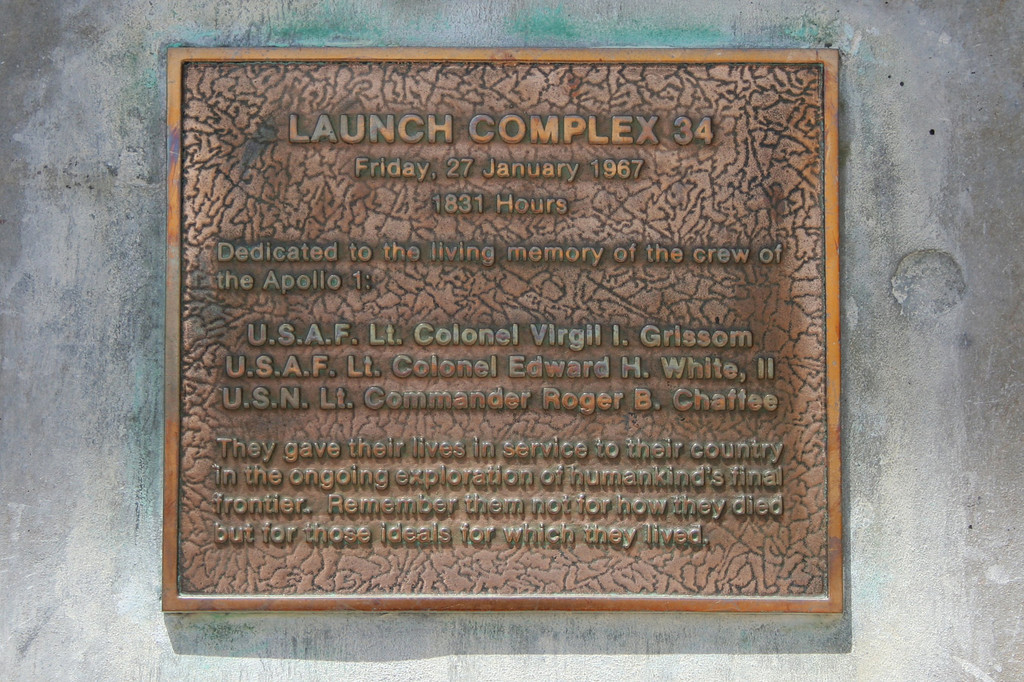
Dedication plaque attached to launch platform

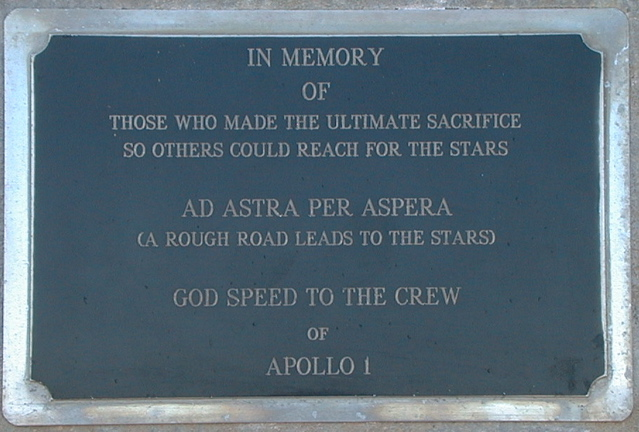
Memorial plaque attached to launch platform

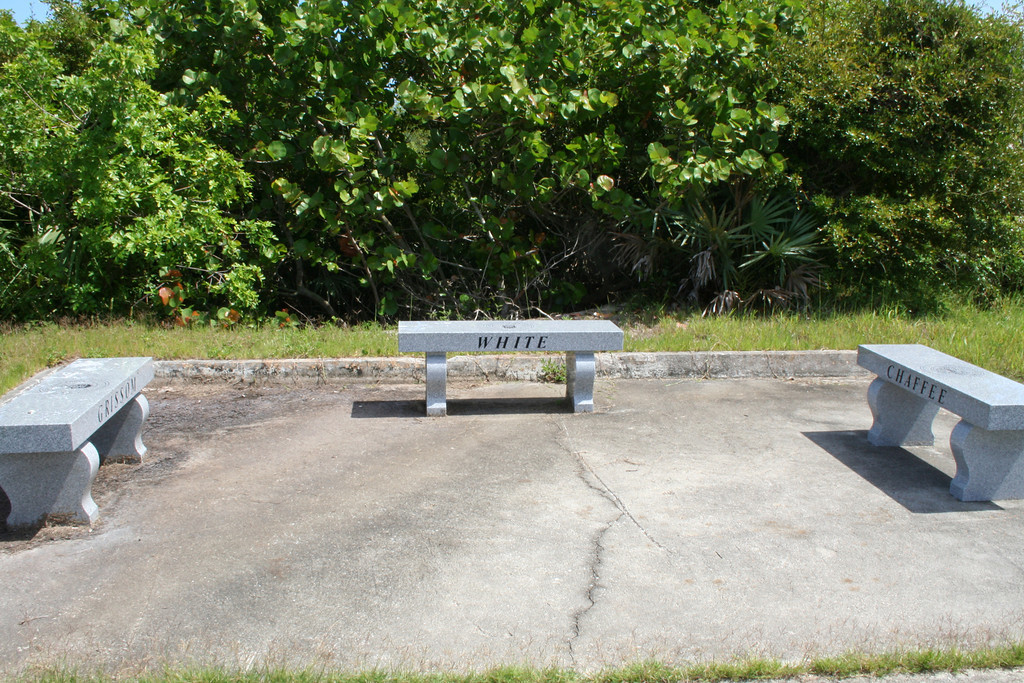
Granite memorial benches on the edge of the launch pad

=== Stars, landmarks on the Moon and Mars ===
- Apollo astronauts frequently aligned their spacecraft inertial navigation platforms and determined their positions relative to the Earth and Moon by sighting sets of stars with optical instruments. Three of the stars in the Apollo catalog were named in honor of the Apollo 1 crew in 1967, shortly after the accident, by their backup crew (the Apollo 9 crew) and Dr. Clarence Cleminshaw of the Griffith Observatory. It has often been incorrectly claimed that the Apollo 1 crew themselves named these stars. Gamma Cassiopeiae became Navi – Ivan (Gus Grissom's middle name) spelled backwards. Iota Ursae Majoris became Dnoces – "Second" spelled backwards, for Edward H. White II. And Gamma Velorum became Regor – Roger (Chaffee) spelled backwards. These names were regularly used by later Apollo crews.
- Three craters on the Moon – Grissom, White and Chaffee – and the Apollo 1 Hills on Mars are named after the three Apollo 1 astronauts.

=== Civic and other memorials ===
- Three public schools in Huntsville, Alabama (home of George C. Marshall Space Flight Center and the U.S. Space & Rocket Center): Virgil I. Grissom High School, Ed White Middle School, and the Chaffee Elementary School.
- Ed White II Elementary e-STEM (Elementary-Science, Technology, Engineering and Math) Magnet school in El Lago, Texas, near the Johnson Space Center. White lived in El Lago (next door to Neil Armstrong).
- There are Grissom or Virgil I. Grissom middle schools in Mishawaka, Indiana, Sterling Heights, Michigan, and Tinley Park, Illinois.
- Grissom Elementary School in Houston, Texas.
- Virgil Grissom Elementary School in Princeton, Iowa, and the Edward White Elementary School in Eldridge, Iowa, are both part of the North Scott Community School District also naming the other three elementary schools after astronauts Neil Armstrong, John Glenn, and Alan Shepard.
- School #7 in Rochester, New York, is also known as the Virgil I. Grissom School.
- In the early 1970s, three streets in Amherst, New York, were named for Chaffee, White and Grissom. By 1991, when no homes had been built on Grissom Drive, the area was repurposed as commercial property; the Grissom street sign was removed and the street renamed Classics V Drive for the banquet hall that occupied the land.
- The THUMS Islands, four man-made oil drilling islands in the harbor off Long Beach, California, are named Grissom, White, Chaffee and Theodore Freeman.
- The Roger B. Chaffee Planetarium is located at the Grand Rapids Public Museum.
- Roger B. Chaffee Memorial Boulevard in Wyoming, Michigan, the largest suburb of Grand Rapids, Michigan, which is today an industrial park, but exists on the site of the former Grand Rapids Airport. A large portion of the north-south runway is used today as the roadway of the Roger B. Chaffee Memorial Boulevard.
- Roger B. Chaffee Scholarship Fund in Grand Rapids, Michigan, each year in memory of Chaffee honors one student who intends to pursue a career in engineering or the sciences
- Three adjacent parks in Fullerton, California, are each named for Grissom, Chaffee and White. The parks are located near a former Hughes Aircraft research and development facility. A Hughes subsidiary, Hughes Space and Communications Company, built components for the Apollo program.
- Two buildings on the campus of Purdue University in West Lafayette, Indiana, are named for Grissom and Chaffee (both Purdue alumni). Grissom Hall houses the School of Industrial Engineering (and was home to the School of Aeronautics and Astronautics before it moved into the new Neil Armstrong Hall of Engineering). Chaffee Hall, constructed in 1965, is the administration complex of Maurice J. Zucrow Laboratories where combustion, propulsion, gas dynamics, and related fields are studied. The Chaffee Hall contains a 72-seat auditorium, offices, and administrative staff.
- A tree for each astronaut was planted in NASA's Astronaut Memorial Grove at the Johnson Space Center in Houston, Texas, not far from the Saturn V building, along with trees for each astronaut from the Challenger and Columbia disasters. Tours of the space center pause briefly near the grove for a moment of silence, and the trees can be seen from nearby NASA Road 1.
- In 1968, Bunker Hill Air Force Base near Peru, Indiana was renamed Grissom Air Force Base. The three-letter code for the VOR air navigation beacon at the base is GUS.
- All three Apollo 1 astronauts are memorialized in Jacksonville, Florida: Edward H. White High School, Chaffee Road, and Grissom Drive.

== Remains of CM-012 ==
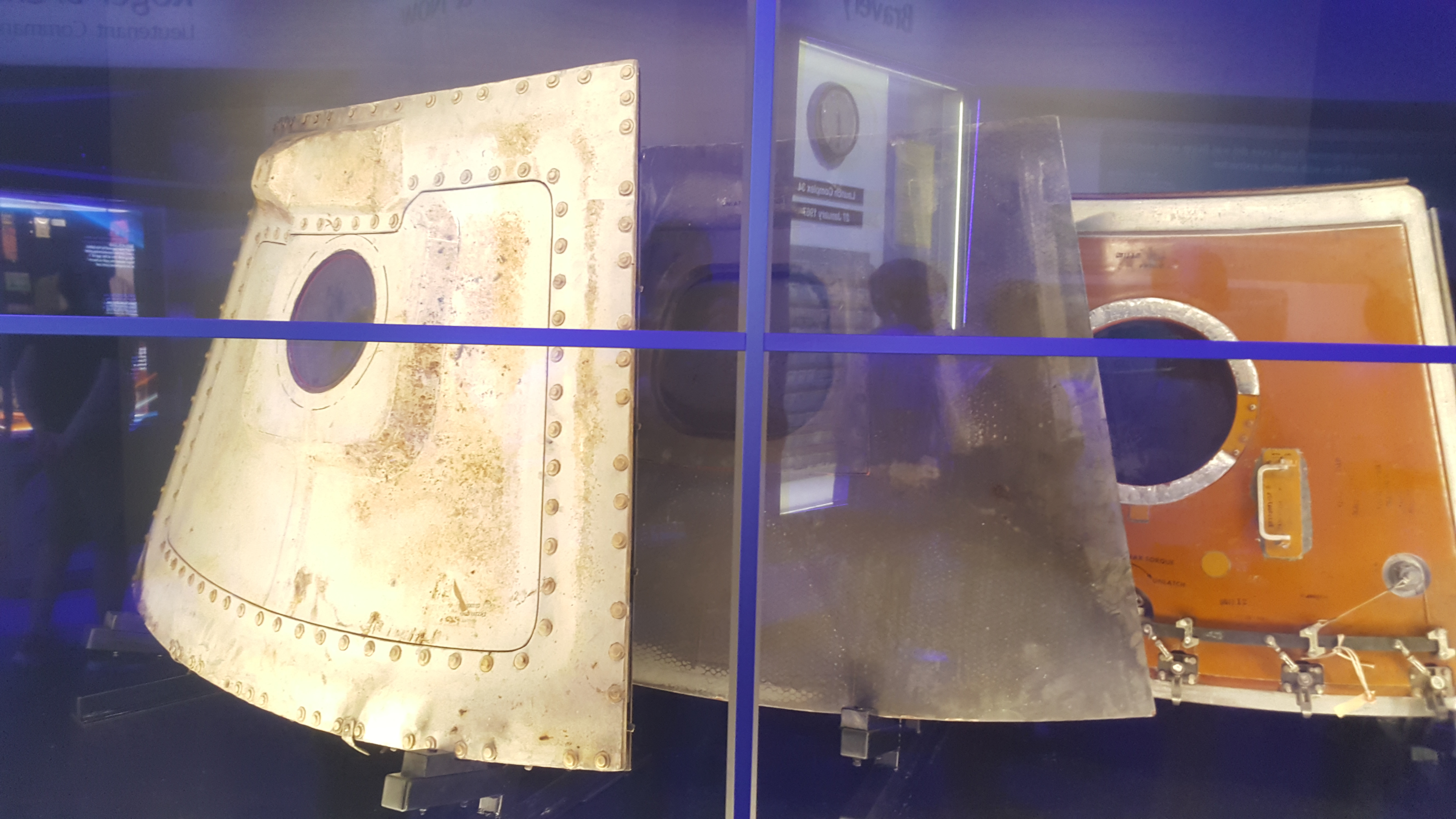
Actual Apollo 1 hatch on display at the Kennedy Space Center Apollo Saturn V complex

The Apollo 1 command module has never been on public display. The spacecraft was removed to Kennedy Space Center for investigation of the accident, after which it was placed in a secured storage warehouse at the NASA Langley Research Center in Hampton, Virginia. On February 17, 2007, it was moved approximately 90 feet (27 m) to a newer, environmentally controlled warehouse. A few weeks earlier, Gus Grissom's brother Lowell had suggested CM-012 be permanently entombed in the concrete remains of Launch Complex 34.

On January 27, 2017, the 50th anniversary of the fire, NASA put the hatch from Apollo 1 on display at the Saturn V Rocket Center at Kennedy Space Center Visitors Complex. The complex also houses memorials including parts of Challenger and Columbia, in the Space Shuttle Atlantis exhibit. "This is way, way, way long overdue. But we're excited about it," said Scott Grissom, Gus Grissom's older son.

== In popular culture ==
- The accident is shown and later referenced in the 1995 movie Apollo 13.
- A scene in the 1998 film Armageddon takes place at Launch Complex 34, with a memorial to the deceased astronauts being shown.
- The accident and its aftermath are the subject of episode 2, "Apollo One", of the 1998 HBO miniseries From the Earth to the Moon.
- The mission and accident are covered in the 2015 ABC television series The Astronaut Wives Club, episodes 8 "Rendezvous" and 9 "Abort" from the point of view of Grissom's widow Betty.
- The incident is the subject of the Public Service Broadcasting track "Fire in the Cockpit" from their 2015 album The Race for Space.
- The incident is featured in the 2018 movie First Man.
- The disaster is referenced in the 2025 novel Atmosphere (novel) by Taylor Jenkins Reid.

== See also ==
- List of spaceflight-related accidents and incidents
- STS-1 – First Space Shuttle flight, three technicians asphyxiated on the launch pad after a countdown test
- STS-51-L – Space Shuttle Challenger, America's first in-flight fatality
- STS-107 – Space Shuttle Columbia, America's first return-flight fatality
- Valentin Bondarenko – a Soviet cosmonaut-in-training, died in a high-oxygen fire in an experimental chamber
- Soyuz 1 – First Soviet spaceflight death
- Soyuz 11 – Loss of an entire Soviet spacecraft crew
