= Phillips Report =

Review of North American Aviation performance on the NASA Apollo program

The Phillips report was a document summarizing a review conducted in November–December 1965 by a NASA team headed by Lieutenant General Samuel C. Phillips, director of the Apollo crewed Moon landing program, to investigate schedule slippage and cost overruns incurred by North American Aviation (NAA), manufacturer of the Command/Service Module spacecraft and the second stage of the Saturn V launch vehicle. Phillips sent a summary of his findings with a strongly worded letter to NAA president Lee Atwood demanding corrective action be taken. North American revised its management of its Apollo contract items, and NASA management considered the matter a normal part of confidential agency–contractor relations.

After a fire killed the entire crew of the first crewed Apollo mission Apollo 1 on January 27, 1967, a United States Senate Committee on Aeronautical and Space Sciences hearing overseeing NASA's investigation of the accident led to the public disclosure of the Phillips Report by then junior senator Walter Mondale, who was told of its existence by ABC News reporter Jules Bergman, who had seen a copy at NASA's Washington, DC Office of Manned Space Flight headquarters.

== Review and NASA's response ==
From November 22 to December 6, 1965, Phillips headed a tiger team investigating the causes of inadequate quality, schedule delays, and cost overruns in both the Apollo CSM and the Saturn V second stage, for which North American was prime contractor. He gave an oral presentation (with transparencies) of his team's findings to his boss, NASA Office of Manned Space Flight Administrator George E. Mueller, and Mueller's boss, NASA Deputy Director Robert Seamans, and also presented them in a letter to North American president Lee Atwood, to which Mueller appended his own strongly worded letter to Atwood.

== Public disclosure and criticism ==
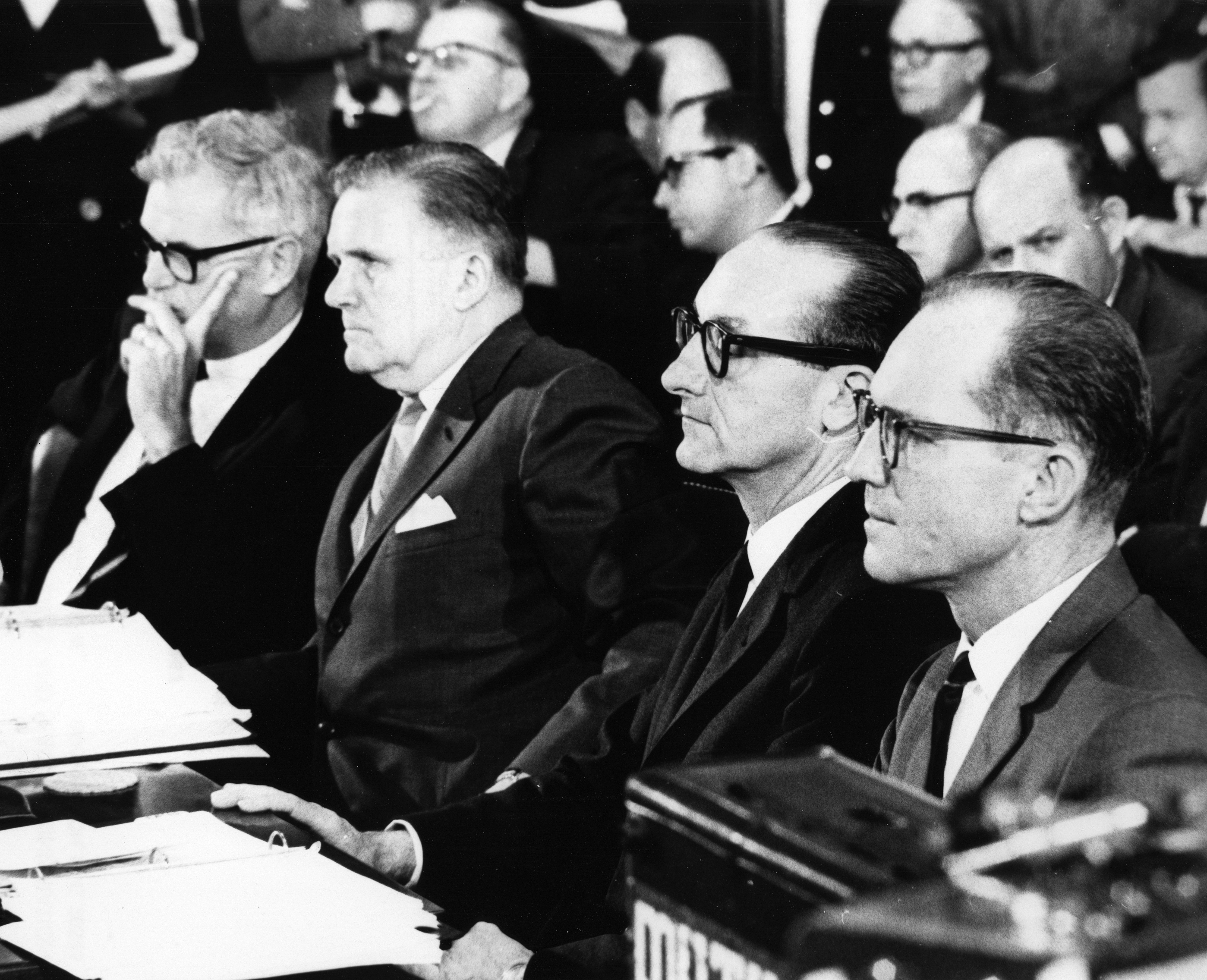
Deputy Administrator Seamans, Administrator Webb, Manned Space Flight Administrator Mueller, and Apollo Program Director Phillips testify before a Senate hearing on the Apollo accident.

Immediately after the fire in 1967, NASA followed its established procedure of investigating and identifying corrections for the cause, with presidential and congressional oversight. No one in NASA's upper management expected that the Phillips findings would be printed as a document, but this had been done and on February 13, Bergman was shown a copy at the Office of Manned Space Flight headquarters. He then told a junior senator on the Aeronautical and Space Sciences Committee, Walter Mondale, about the document, and later reported its existence on ABC. Mondale proceeded to grill the top managers, including Administrator James E. Webb, who was completely blind-sided (the formal review had not gone above Seamans), about the report's existence. Other senators, such as Margaret Chase, then questioned Webb about NASA's choice of North American as the Apollo contractor.

Mondale said he had been told of the existence what he called "the Phillips report", and Seamans was afraid that Mondale might be in possession of a hard copy of the presentation, so he said tentatively that contractors have occasionally been given negative reviews, but that he knew of no such extraordinary report. Mondale raised controversy over the report, despite Phillips' refusal to characterize it as such before Congress, and was angered by what he perceived as Webb's deception and concealment of important program problems from Congress, and questioned NASA's selection of North American as prime contractor. Webb eventually provided a controlled copy of Phillips' memo to Congress. Seamans later wrote that Webb roundly chastised him in the cab ride leaving the hearing for volunteering information which led to the disclosure of Phillips' memo.

== Senate conclusions ==
The committee concluded in its final report that "the findings of the [Phillips] task force had no effect on the accident, did not lead to the accident, and were not related to the accident", but in its recommendations, stated "the committee believes it should have been informed of the situation." Freshman senators Edward Brooke and Charles H. Percy jointly wrote an "Additional Views" section appended to the committee report, expressing more strongly that the Phillips review should have been disclosed to Congress. Mondale wrote his own Additional View, voicing his complaints in the most strongly worded terms.

In its final report, the committee agreed with NASA that the Phillips review had absolutely no bearing on the fire, though the chairman expressed his disappointment that Webb had not kept them informed of Apollo program problems at the time. But Mondale issued a minority opinion accusing NASA of "evasiveness, ... lack of candor, ... patronizing attitude exhibited toward Congress, ... refusal to respond fully and forthrightly to legitimate congressional inquiries, and ... solicitous concern for corporate sensitivities at a time of national tragedy".
