= Wayne Hale =

American NASA engineer (born 1954)

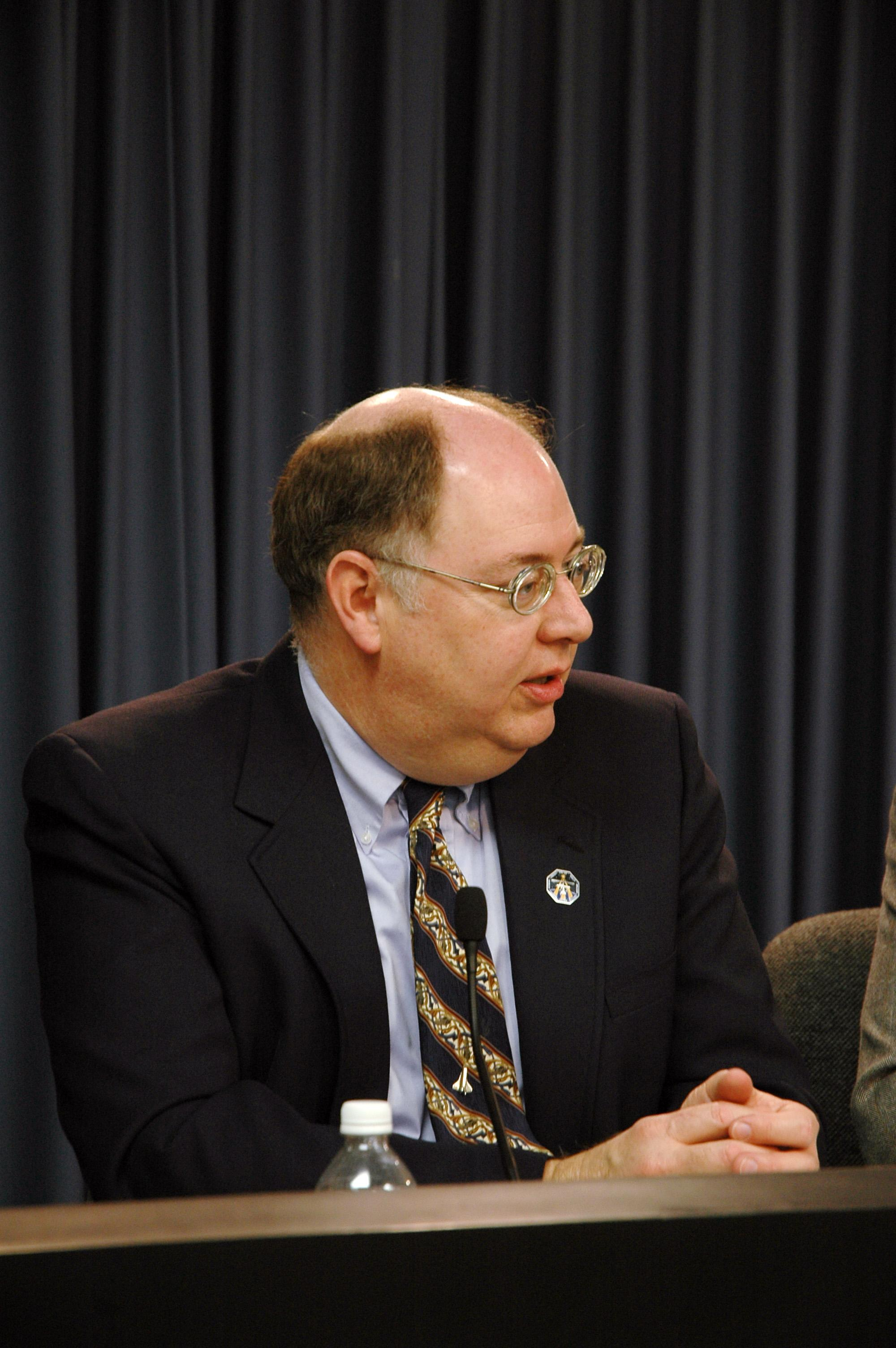
- Hale in 2006
- Born: N. Wayne Hale Jr. July 5, 1954 (age 72); Clovis, New Mexico, U.S.
- Education: BS, Mechanical Engineering, Rice University; MS, Mechanical Engineering, Purdue University
- Occupation: Engineer
- Employer: NASA
- Title: NASA's Deputy Associate Administrator for Strategic Partnerships

N. Wayne Hale Jr. (born July 5, 1954) is an American former NASA engineer. Previously a flight director and Space Shuttle program manager, Hale served as NASA's Deputy Associate Administrator for Strategic Partnerships prior to his retirement on July 31, 2010.

Born in Clovis, New Mexico, Hale earned a Bachelor of Science in mechanical engineering from Rice University in 1976, and a Master of Science in mechanical engineering from Purdue University in 1978.

== NASA career ==
Hale began his career with NASA in 1978 as a propulsion officer in the Propulsion Systems Section, Flight Control Division of Flight Operations at the Johnson Space Center.

From May to November 1985, Hale was head of the Integrated Communications Section, Systems Division, Mission Operations, and head of the Propulsion Systems Section, Systems Division, Mission Operations, from November 1985 to March 1988. Between March 1988 and January 2003, Hale served as a flight director in Mission Control for forty-one Space Shuttle missions. He also served as deputy chief of the Flight Director Office for Shuttle Operations from 2001 to January 2003.

Hale then relocated to Kennedy Space Center to become the launch integration manager of the Space Shuttle Program effective February 1, 2003. In July 2003 he became deputy manager of the program, moving up to manager in September 2005. In this capacity, he was responsible for overall management, integration, and operations of the Space Shuttle Program. His primary responsibilities include establishing and implementing program policy; directing and controlling scheduling, planning and execution of the Space Shuttle Program design, development, test, production, and operations; ensuring the integration of all elements of the program into a single operational system; ensuring effective cost control of the total program; and establishing and controlling Space Shuttle requirements and configuration.

He retired from NASA on July 31, 2010.

Hale had written a blog while at NASA, and after retiring he resumed posting on an external site unrelated to NASA.

== Awards ==
Among the honors and awards he has received are the NASA Space Flight Awareness Leadership Award in January 2002, the NASA Outstanding Leadership Medal in August 1999, the NASA Exceptional Service Medal in April 1992, and numerous NASA Group Achievement Awards.
