= Geodetic airframe =

Type of aircraft structure

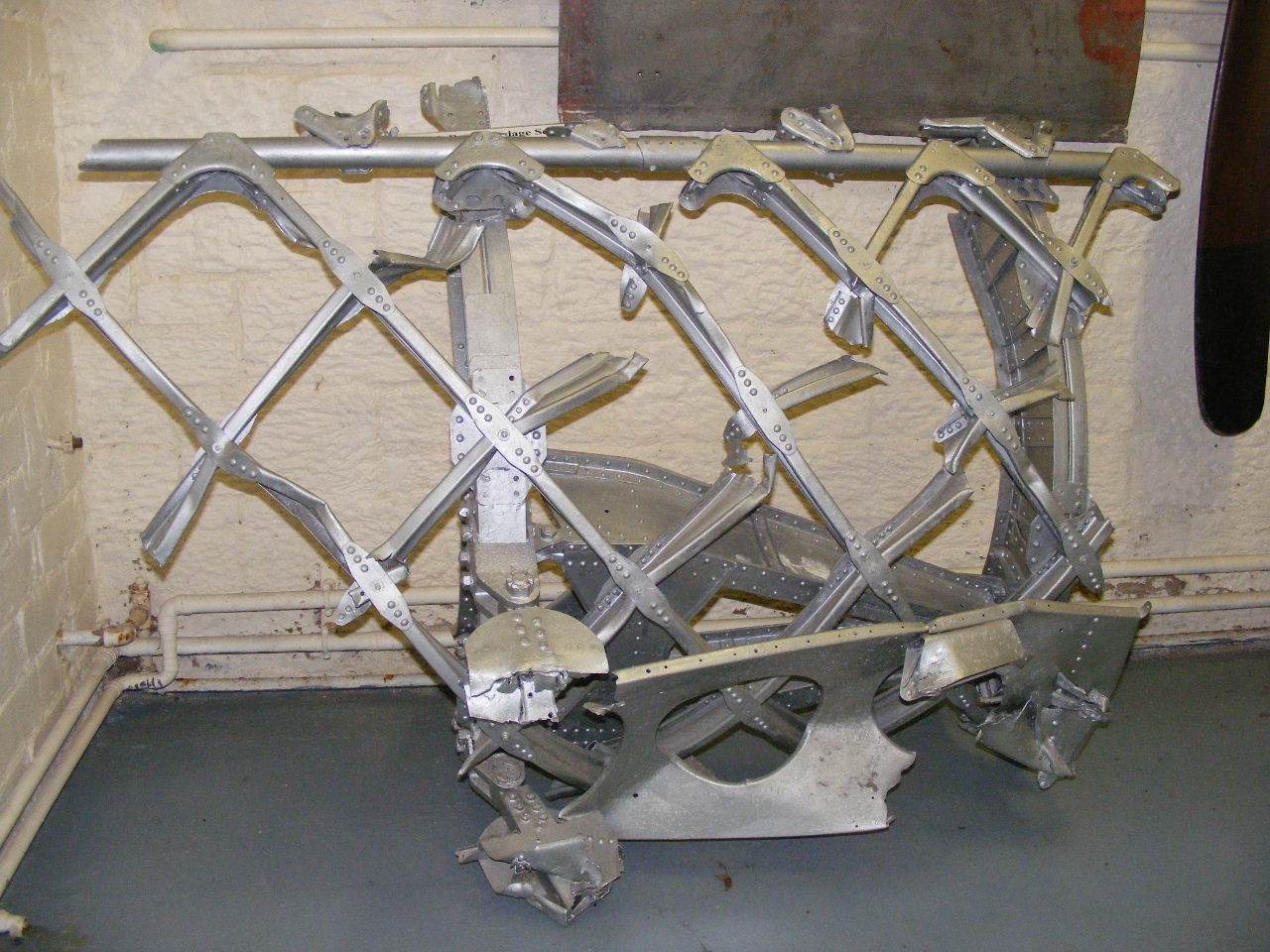
A section of the rear fuselage from a Vickers Warwick showing the geodetic construction in duralumin. On exhibit at the Armstrong & Aviation Museum at Bamburgh Castle.

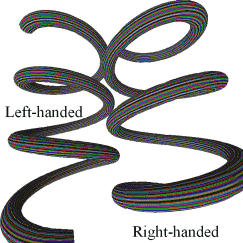
Left-handed helix and Right-handed helix

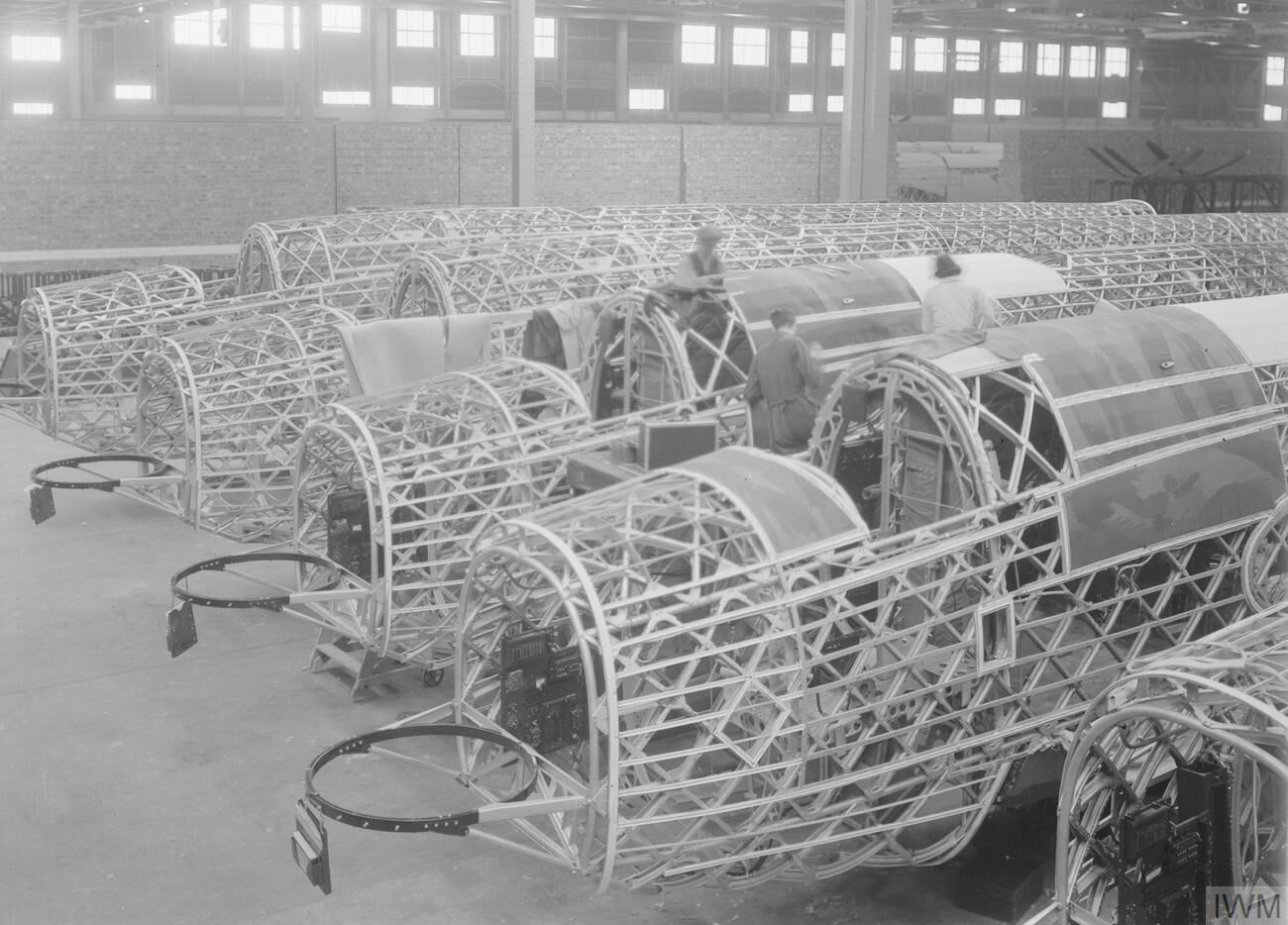
Vickers Wellingtons under construction, showing the geodetic airframe

A geodesic airframe is a type of construction for the airframes of aircraft developed by British aeronautical engineer Barnes Wallis in the 1930s (who sometimes spelt it "geodesic"). Earlier, it was used by Professor Johann Schütte, in partnership with Dr Karl Lanz, for the Schütte Lanz Airship SL 1 in 1909. It makes use of a space frame formed from a helical left-handed and a helical right-handed crossing basket-weave of load-bearing members. The principle is that two geodesic arcs can be drawn to intersect on a curving surface (the fuselage) in a manner that the torsional load on each cancels out that on the other.

== Early examples ==
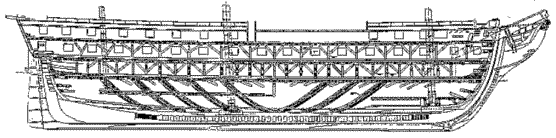
18th-century American warship's "Diagonal riders" in their construction

The "diagonal rider" structural element was used by Joshua Humphreys in the first US Navy sail frigates in 1794. Diagonal riders are viewable in the interior hull structure of the preserved USS Constitution on display in Boston Harbor. The structure was a pioneering example of placing "non-orthogonal" structural components within an otherwise conventional structure for its time. The "diagonal riders" were included in these American naval vessels' construction as one of five elements to reduce the problem of hogging in the ship's hull, and did not make up the bulk of the vessel's structure, they do not constitute a completely "geodetic" space frame.

Calling any diagonal wood brace (as used on gates, buildings, ships or other structures with cantilevered or diagonal loads) an example of geodesic design is a misnomer. In a geodetic structure, the strength and structural integrity, and indeed the shape, come from the diagonal "braces" - the structure does not need the "bits in between" for part of its strength (implicit in the name space frame) as does a more conventional wooden structure.

== Aeroplanes ==
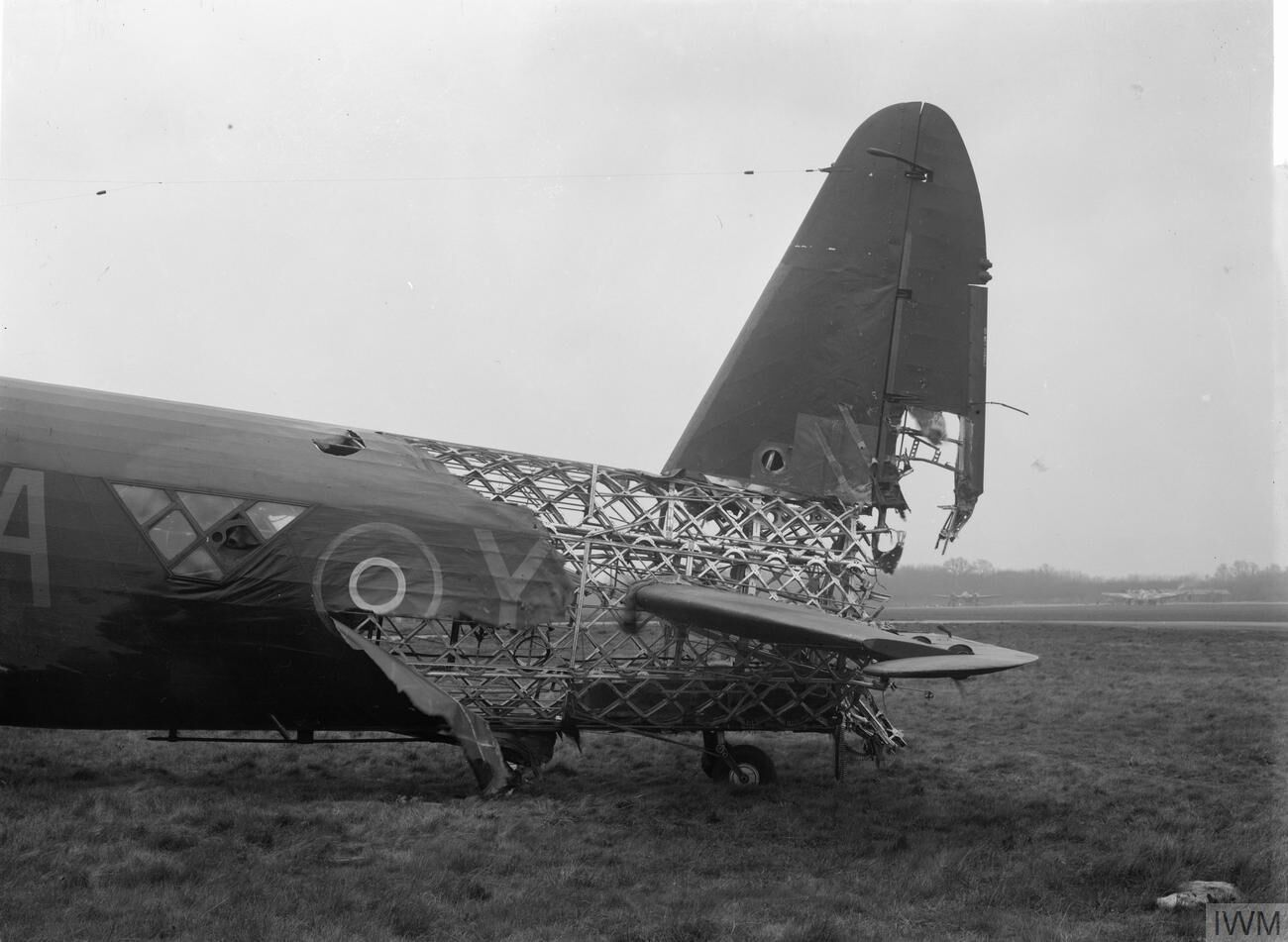
Wellington Mk.X HE239 of No.428 Sqn. RCAF, illustrating the geodetic construction and the level of battle damage it could sustain and still return to base

The earliest-known use of a geodetic airframe design for any aircraft was for the pre-World War I Schütte-Lanz SL1 rigid airship's envelope structure] of 1911, with the airship capable of up to a 38.3 km/h (23.8 mph) top airspeed.

The Latécoère 6 was a French four-engined biplane bomber of the early 1920s. It was of advanced all-metal construction and probably the first aeroplane to use geodetic construction. Only one was built.

Barnes Wallis, inspired by his earlier experience with light alloy structures and the use of geodesically-arranged wiring to distribute the lifting loads of the gasbags in the design of the R100 airship, evolved the geodetic construction method (although it is commonly stated, there was no geodetic structure in R100). Wallis used the term "geodetic" to apply to the airframe; it is referred to as "Vickers-Wallis construction" in some early company documents. "Geodesic" is used in the United States for aircraft structures.

The system was later used by Wallis's employer, Vickers-Armstrongs in a series of bomber aircraft, the Wellesley, Wellington, Warwick and Windsor. In these aircraft, the fuselage and wing were built up from duralumin alloy channel-beams that were formed into a large framework. Wooden battens were screwed onto the metal, to which the doped linen skin of the aircraft was fixed. The Windsor had a woven metal skin.

The metal lattice-work gave a light and very strong structure. The benefit of the geodetic construction was larger internal volume for a given streamlined shape. Flight magazine described a geodetic frame as sheet metal covering in which diamond shaped holes have been cut leaving behind the geodetic strips. The benefit was offset by having to construct the fuselage as a complete assembly unlike aircraft using stressed-skin construction which could be built in sections. In addition, fabric covering on the geodetic frame was not suitable for higher flying aircraft that had to be pressurised. The difficulty of providing a pressurised compartment in a geodetic frame was a challenge during the design of the high altitude Wellington Mk. V. The pressure cabin, which expanded and contracted independently of the rest of the airframe, had to be attached at the nodal points of the structure.

Geodetic wing and fin structures, taken from the Wellington, were used on the post-war Vickers VC.1 Viking, but with a metal stressed-skin fuselage. Later production Vikings were completely stressed-skin construction marking the end of geodetic construction at Vickers.

== See also ==
- Design principle
- Figure of the Earth
- Geodesic dome
- Geodesic (disambiguation)
- Geodetic system
