= Barnes Wallis =

English engineer and inventor (1887–1979)

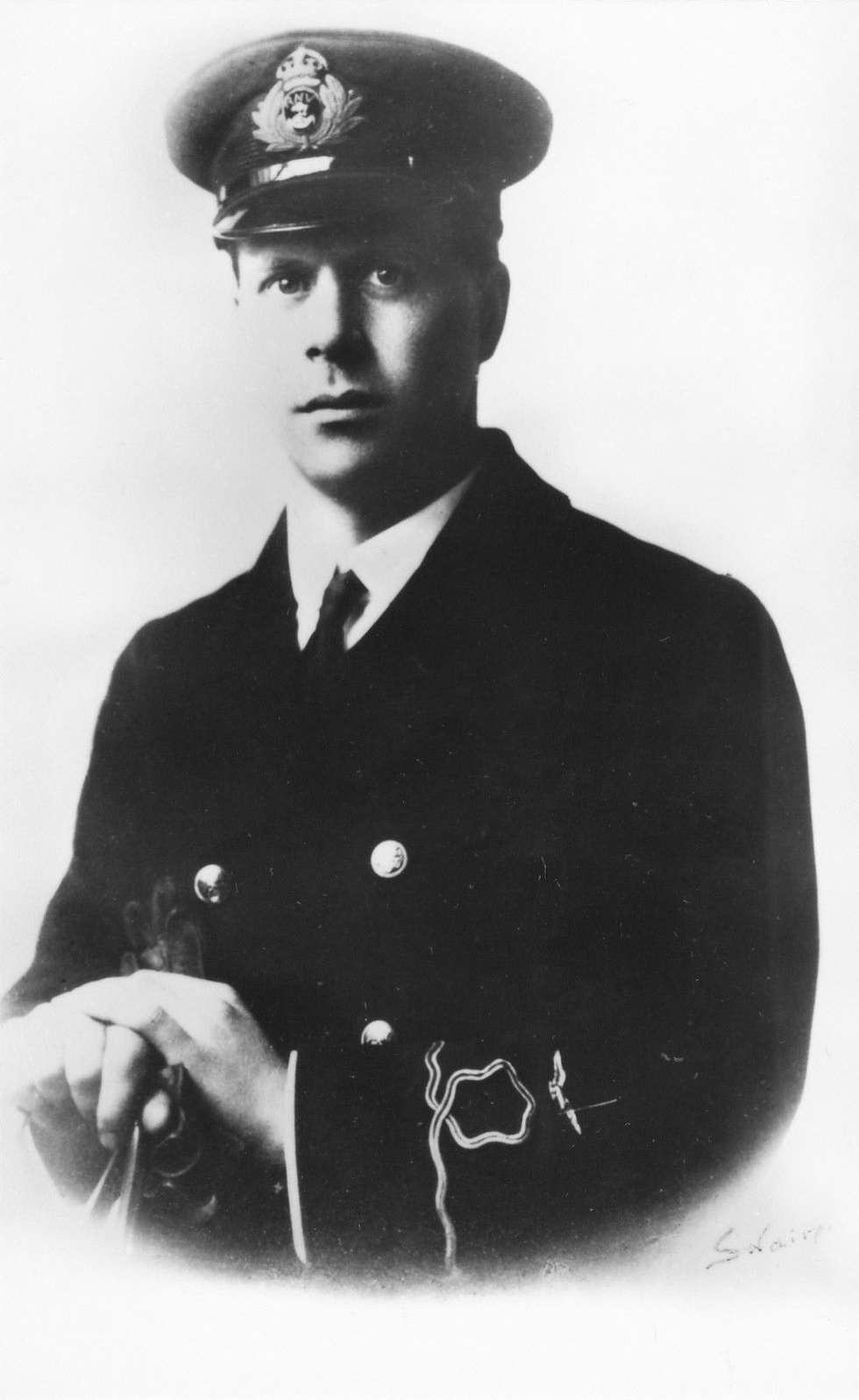
- Wallis as a sub-lieutenant in the Royal Naval Air Service
- Born: Barnes Neville Wallis; 26 September 1887; Ripley, Derbyshire, England
- Died: 30 October 1979 (aged 92); Leatherhead, Surrey, England
- Resting place: St Lawrence's Church, Effingham, Surrey
- Occupations: Scientist, engineer and inventor
- Known for: Having invented the bouncing bomb, geodetic airframe design and the earthquake bomb
- Parents: Charles William George Robinson Wallis; Edith Eyre Ashby
- Awards: Albert Medal (1968); Royal Medal (1975)

Sir Barnes Neville Wallis (26 September 1887 – 30 October 1979) was an English engineer and inventor. He is best known for having invented the bouncing bomb used by the Royal Air Force in Operation Chastise (the "Dambusters" raid) to attack the dams of the Ruhr Valley during World War II.

The raid was the subject of the 1955 film The Dam Busters, in which Wallis was played by Michael Redgrave. Among his other inventions were his version of the geodetic airframe and the earthquake bomb, including designs such as the Tallboy and Grand Slam bombs.

== Early life and education ==
Barnes Wallis was born in Ripley, Derbyshire, to general practitioner Charles George Wallis (1859–1945) and his wife Edith Eyre (1859–1911), daughter of Rev. John Ashby. The Wallis family subsequently moved to New Cross, south London, living in "straitened, genteel circumstances" after Charles Wallis was crippled by polio in 1893. He was educated at Christ's Hospital in Horsham and Haberdashers' Aske's Hatcham Boys' Grammar School in southeast London, leaving school at seventeen to start work in January 1905 at Thames Engineering Works at Blackheath, southeast London. He subsequently changed his apprenticeship to J. Samuel White's, the shipbuilders based at Cowes on the Isle of Wight. He originally trained as a marine engineer and in 1922 he took a degree in engineering via the University of London External Programme.

== Aircraft and geodetic construction ==
Wallis left J. Samuel White's in 1913 when an opportunity arose for him as an aircraft designer, at first working on airships and later aeroplanes. He joined Vickers – later part of Vickers-Armstrongs and then part of the British Aircraft Corporation – and worked for them until his retirement in 1971. He began by working under H. B. Pratt on the Admiralty's first rigid airship HMA No. 9r, helping to nurse it through its political stop-go career and protracted development. The first airship of his own design, the R80, incorporated many technical innovations and flew in 1920.

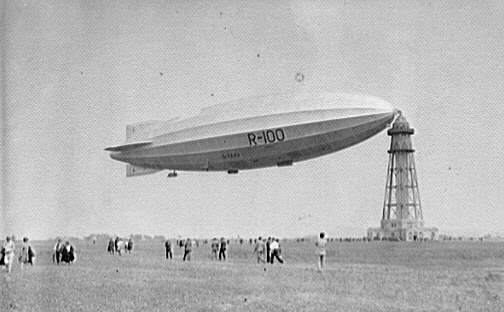
R100 airship

By 1925, when he started to design the R100, the airship for which he is best known, he had developed his revolutionary geodetic construction (also known as geodesic), which he applied to the gasbag framing. He also pioneered, along with John Edwin Temple, the use of light alloy and production engineering in the structural design of the R100. Nevil Shute Norway, later to become a writer under the name of Nevil Shute, was the chief calculator for the project, responsible for calculating the stresses on the frame.

Despite a better-than-expected performance and a successful return flight to Canada in 1930, the R100 was broken up following the crash in northern France of its sister ship, the R101 (which was designed and built by a team from the Air Ministry). The 1937 destruction of the German Hindenburg led to the abandonment of airships as a mode of mass transport.

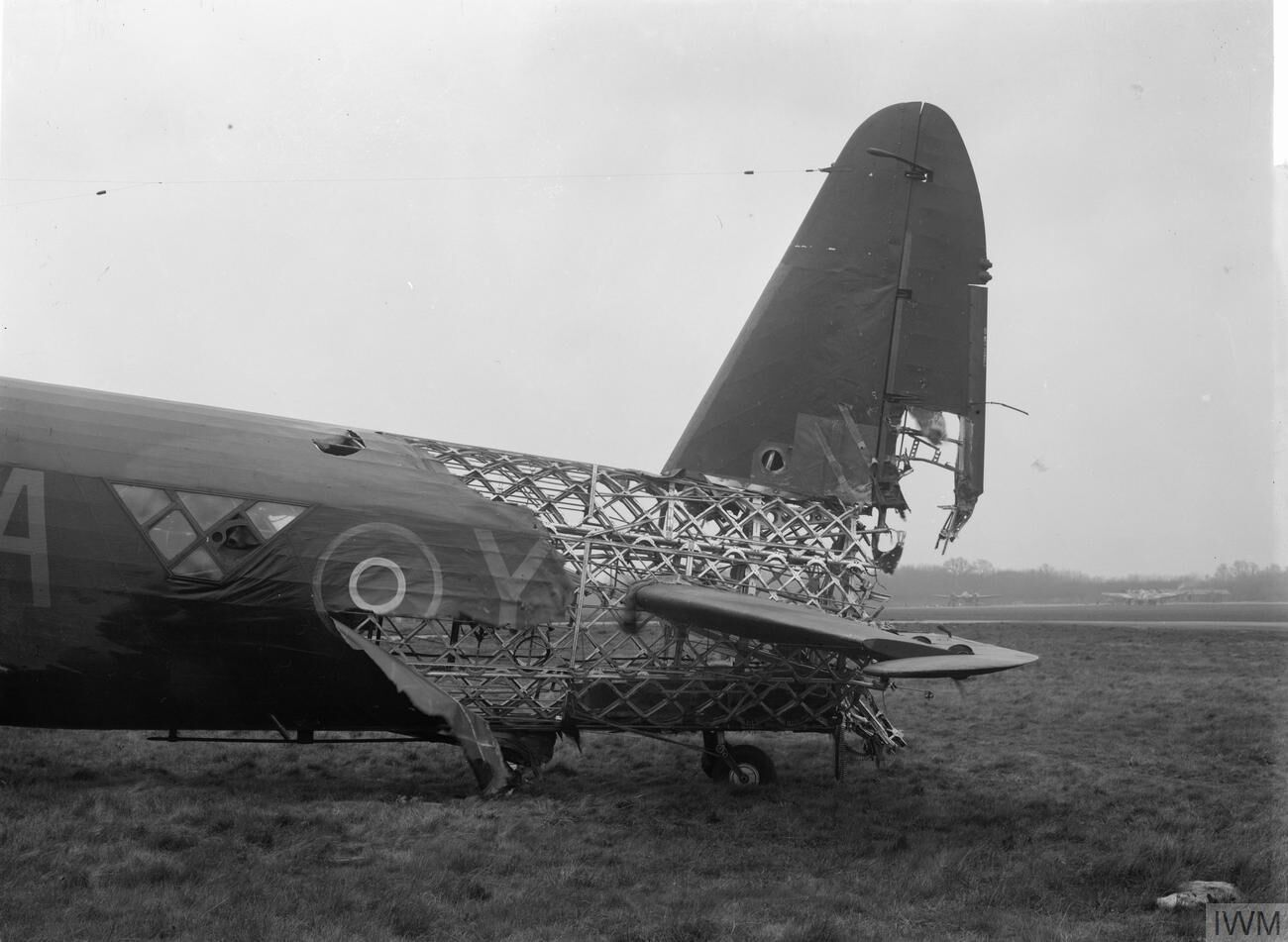
RCAF Wellington bomber, having flown back to England despite a direct anti-aircraft hit, with exposed geodetic airframe construction

By the time of the R101 crash, Wallis had moved to the Vickers aircraft factory at the Brooklands motor circuit and aerodrome, between Byfleet and Weybridge in Surrey. The pre-war aircraft designs of Rex Pierson – the Wellesley, the Wellington and the later Warwick and Windsor – all employed Wallis's geodetic design in the fuselage and wing structures.

The Wellington had one of the most robust airframes ever developed; the geodetic construction offered a light and strong airframe (compared to conventional designs), with clearly defined space within for fuel tanks, payload and so on. The technique was not easily transferred to other aircraft manufacturers, nor was Vickers able to build other designs in factories tooled for geodetic work.

== Bombs ==
After the outbreak of the Second World War in Europe in 1939, Wallis saw a need for strategic bombing to destroy the enemy's ability to wage war and he wrote a paper titled "A Note on a Method of Attacking the Axis Powers". Referring to the enemy's power supplies, he wrote (as Axiom 3): "If their destruction or paralysis can be accomplished they offer a means of rendering the enemy utterly incapable of continuing to prosecute the war". As a means to do this, he proposed huge bombs that could concentrate their force and destroy targets which were otherwise unlikely to be affected. Wallis's first super-large bomb design came out at some ten tons, far more than any current bomber could carry. Rather than drop the idea, this led him to suggest a plane that could carry it – the "Victory Bomber".

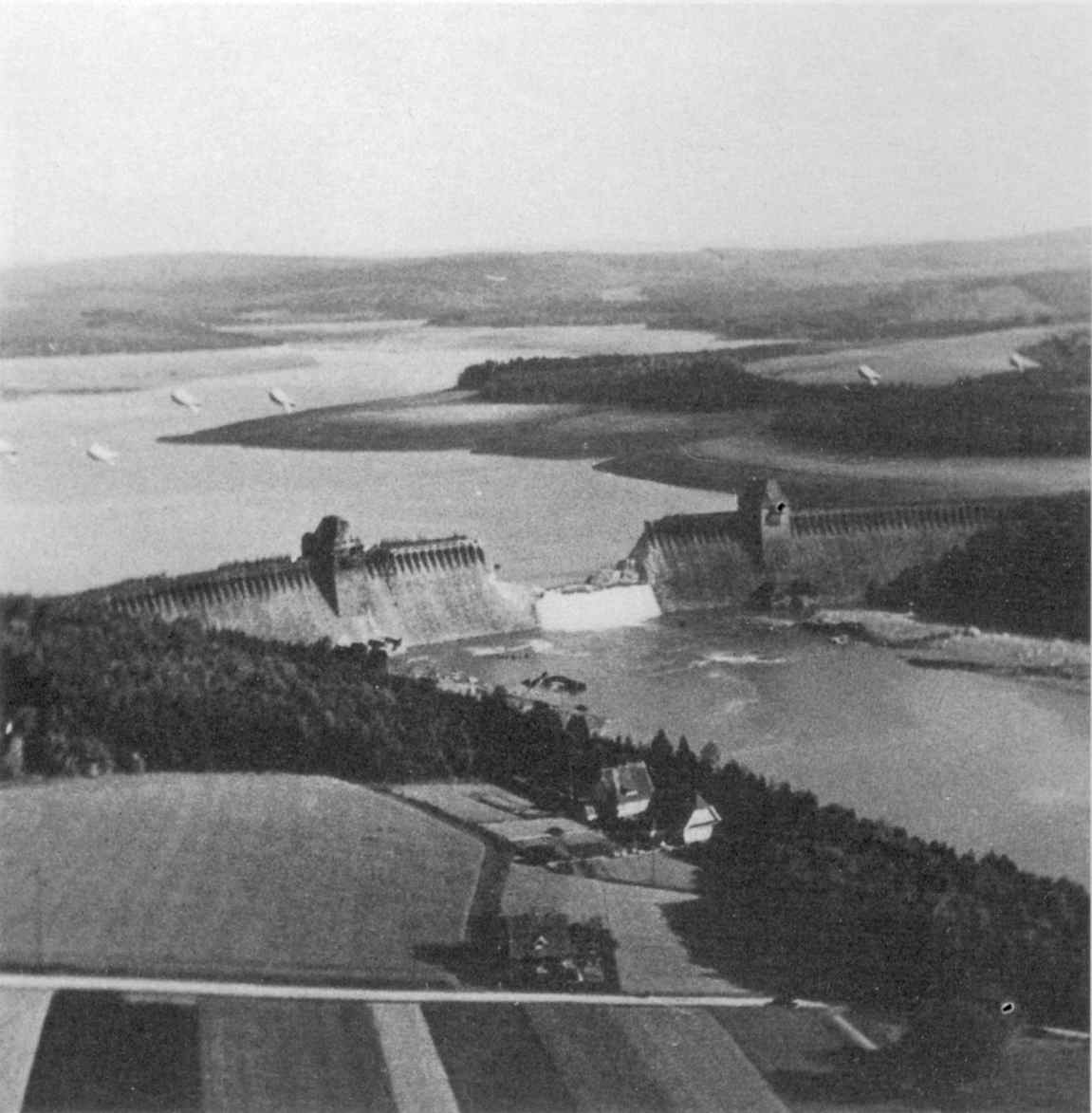
The Möhne Dam, breached by bouncing bombs

Early in 1942, Wallis began experimenting with skipping marbles over water tanks in his garden, leading to his April 1942 paper "Spherical Bomb – Surface Torpedo". The idea was that a bomb could skip over the water surface, avoiding torpedo nets, and sink directly next to a battleship or dam wall as a depth charge, with the surrounding water concentrating the force of the explosion on the target.

A crucial innovation was to spin the bomb. The spin direction determined the number of bounces/range of the bomb. A change to backspin (rather than top-spin), was put forward by another Vickers designer, George Edwards, based on his knowledge as a cricketer. Spin caused the bomb to trail behind the dropping aircraft (decreasing the chance of that aircraft being damaged by the force of the explosion below), increased the range of the bomb, and also prevented it from moving away from the target wall as it sank. After some initial scepticism, the Air Force accepted Wallis's bouncing bomb (codenamed Upkeep) for attacks on the Möhne, Eder and Sorpe dams in the Ruhr area.

The raid on these dams in May 1943 (Operation Chastise) was immortalised in Paul Brickhill's 1951 book The Dam Busters and the 1955 film of the same name. The Möhne and Eder dams were breached, causing damage to German factories and disrupting hydro-electric power.

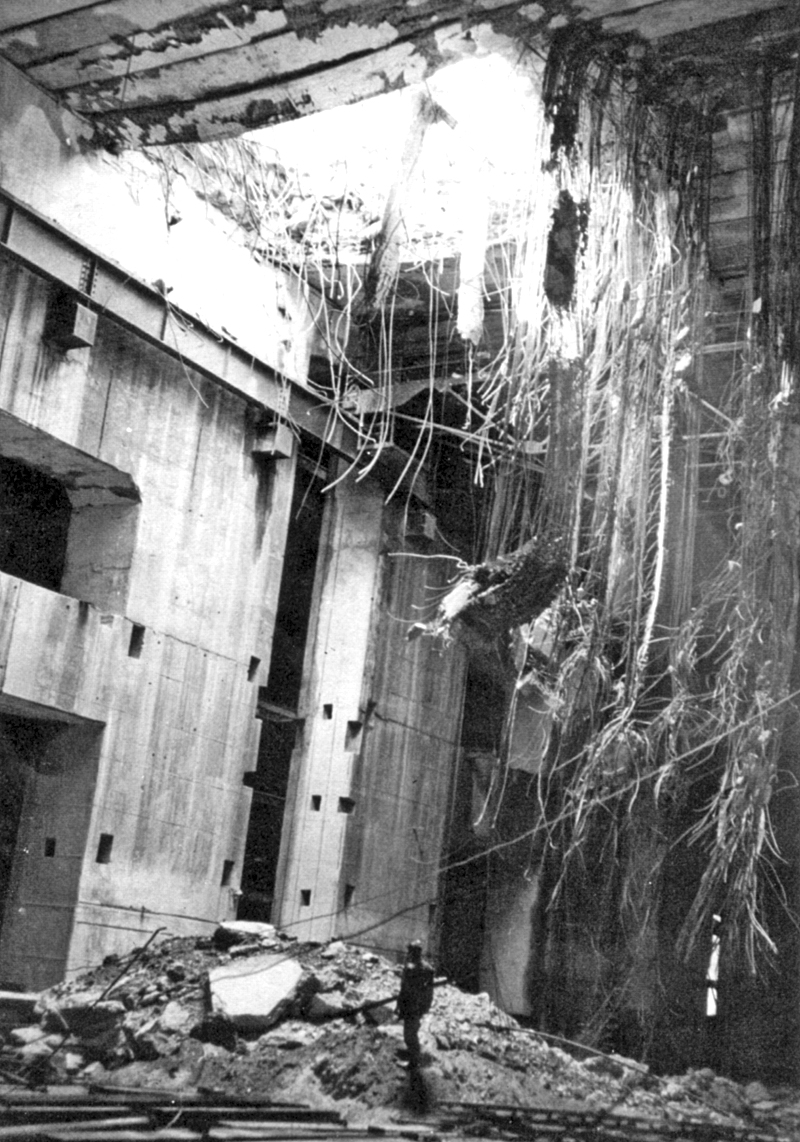
Valentin U-boat pen, with its roof of 4.5 m (15 ft) of reinforced concrete blown open by a Grand Slam bomb

After the success of the bouncing bomb, Wallis was able to return to his huge bombs, producing first the 12,000 lb (5.4 t) (Note: This was not the same as the 12,000 lb High Capacity "blockbuster" bomb, which was a conventional blast bomb) Tallboy and then the 22,000 lb (10.0 t) Grand Slam deep-penetration earthquake bombs. Although there was still no aircraft capable of lifting these two bombs to their optimal release altitude, they could be dropped from a lower height, entering the earth at supersonic speed and penetrating to a depth of 20 m (66 ft) before exploding. They were used on strategic German targets such as V-2 rocket launch sites, the V-3 supergun bunker, submarine pens and other reinforced structures, large civil constructions such as viaducts and bridges, as well as the battleship Tirpitz. They were forerunners of bunker-busting bombs.

== Post-war research ==
=== Aircraft design ===
Having been dispersed with the Design Office from Brooklands to the nearby Burhill Golf Club in Hersham, after the Vickers factory was badly bombed in September 1940, Wallis returned to Brooklands in November 1945 as head of the Vickers-Armstrongs Research & Development Department which was based in the former motor circuit's 1907 clubhouse. Here he and his staff worked on many futuristic aerospace projects including supersonic flight and "swing-wing" technology (later used in the Panavia Tornado and other aircraft types). Following the high death toll of the aircrews involved in the Dambusters raid, he made a conscious effort never again to endanger the lives of his test pilots. His designs were extensively tested in model form, and consequently he became a pioneer in the remote control of aircraft.

A massive 19,533 square feet (1,814.7 m^{2}) Stratosphere Chamber (which was the world's largest facility of its type) was designed and built beside the clubhouse by 1948. It became the focus for much R&D work under Wallis's direction in the 1950s and 1960s, including research into supersonic aerodynamics that contributed to the design of Concorde, before finally closing by 1980. This unique structure was restored at Brooklands Museum thanks to a grant from the AIM-Biffa fund in 2013 and was officially reopened by Mary Stopes-Roe, Barnes Wallis's daughter, on 13 March 2014.

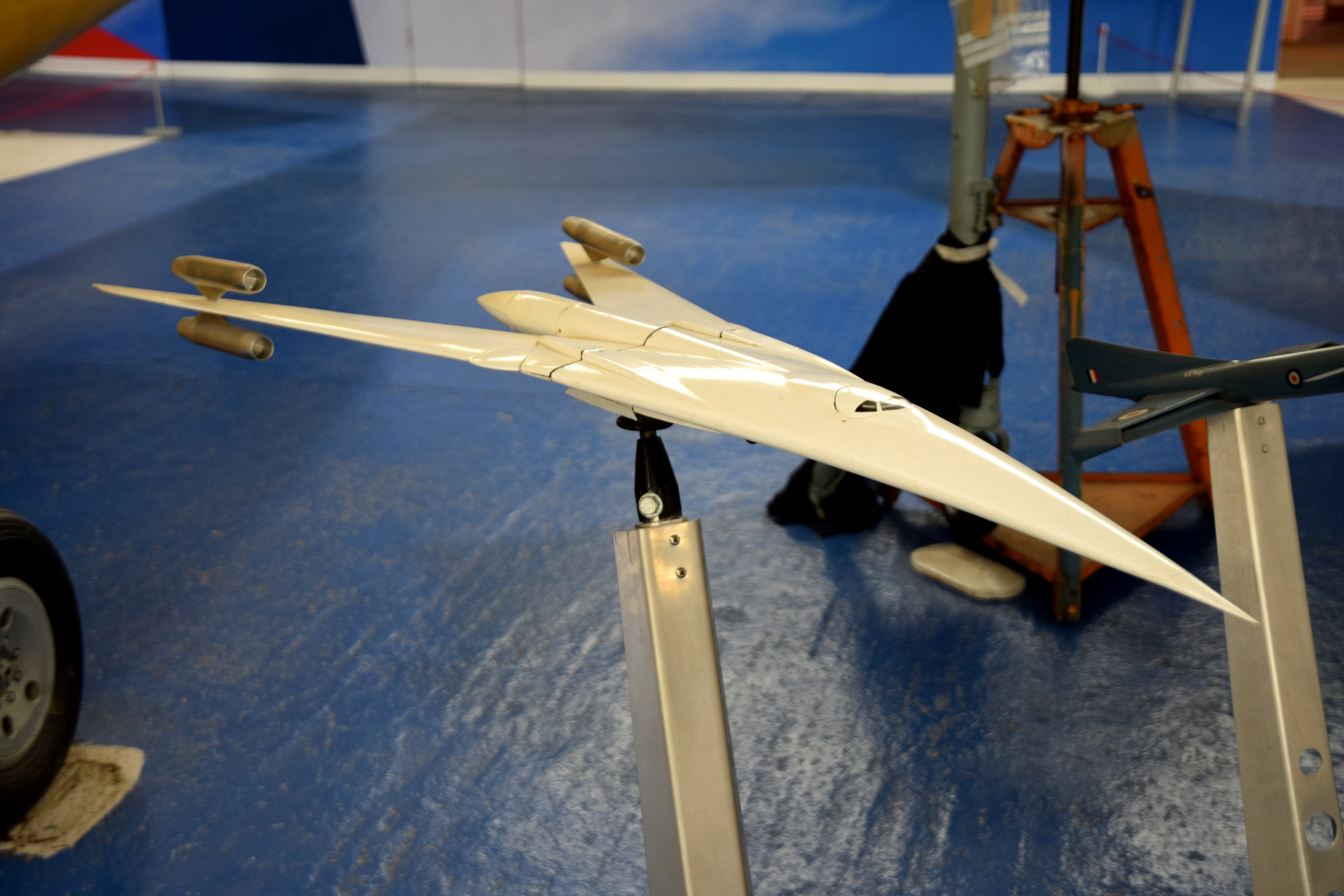
Swallow model at Royal Air Force Museum Cosford

Although he did not invent the concept, Wallis did much pioneering engineering work to make the swing-wing functional. He developed the wing-controlled aerodyne, a concept for a tailless aeroplane controlled entirely by wing movement with no separate control surfaces. His Wild Goose, designed in the late 1940s, was intended to use laminar flow, and alongside it he also worked on the Green Lizard cruise missile and the Heston JC.9 manned experimental aeroplane. The Swallow was a supersonic development of Wild Goose, designed in the mid-1950s, which could have been developed for either military or civil applications. Both Wild Goose and Swallow were flight tested as large (30 ft span) flying scale models, based at Predannack in Cornwall. Despite promising wind tunnel and model work, his designs were not adopted. Government funding for Swallow was cancelled in the round of cuts following the Sandys Defence White Paper in 1957 (the Sandystorm), although Vickers continued model trials with some support from the RAE.

An attempt to gain American funding led Wallis to initiate a joint NASA-Vickers study. NASA found aerodynamic problems with the Swallow and, informed also by their work on the Bell X-5, settled for a conventional tail which would eventually lead in turn to the TFX programme and the General Dynamics F-111. In the UK, Vickers submitted a wing-controlled aerodyne for specification OR.346 for a reconnaissance/strike-fighter-bomber, the TSR-2 specification with added fighter capability. When Maurice Brennan left Vickers for Folland he worked on the FO.147, a variable-sweep development of the Gnat lightweight fighter-trainer, offering both tailed and tailless options. Wallis's ideas were ultimately passed over in the UK in favour of the fixed-wing BAC TSR-2 and Concorde. He was critical of both, believing that swing-wing designs would have been more appropriate. In the mid-1960s, TSR-2 was ignominiously scrapped in favour of the American F-111, which had swing-wings influenced by Wallis's work at NASA, although this order was also subsequently cancelled.

=== Other work ===
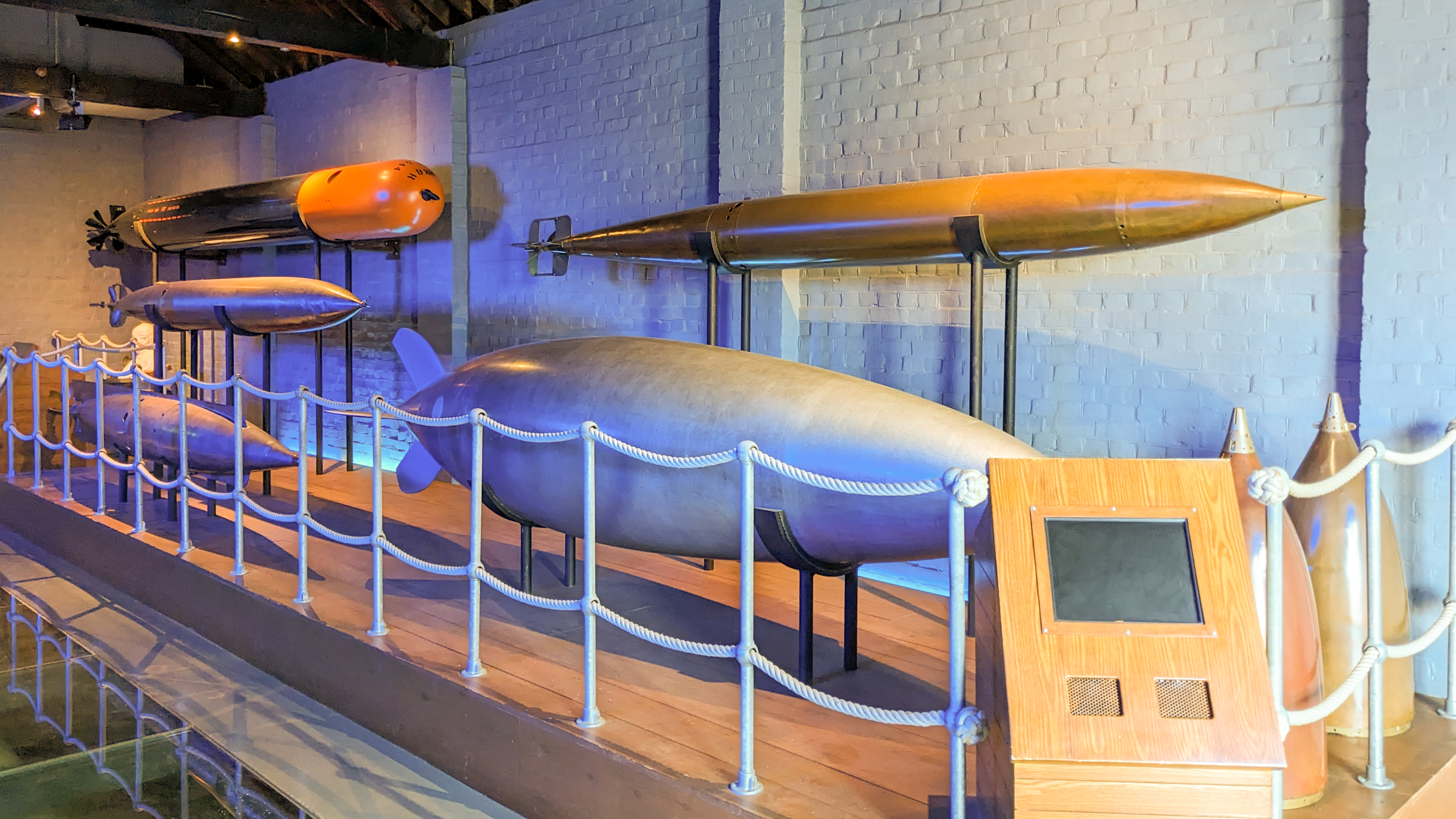
Project Heyday test body exhibited at the Explosion Museum of Naval Firepower

In the 1950s, Wallis developed an experimental rocket-propelled torpedo codenamed HEYDAY. It was powered by compressed air and hydrogen peroxide, and had an unusual streamlined shape designed to maintain laminar flow over much of its length. Tests were conducted from Portland Breakwater in Dorset. The only surviving example is on display in the Explosion Museum of Naval Firepower at Gosport.

In 1955, Wallis agreed to act as a consultant to the project to build the Parkes Radio Telescope in Australia. Some of the ideas he suggested are the same as or closely related to the final design, including the idea of supporting the dish at its centre, the geodetic structure of the dish and the master equatorial control system. Unhappy with the direction it had taken, Wallis left the project halfway into the design study and refused to accept his £1,000 consultant's fee.

In the 1960s, Wallis also proposed using large cargo submarines to transport oil and other goods, thus avoiding surface weather conditions. Wallis's calculations indicated that the power requirements for an underwater vessel were lower than for a comparable conventional ship and they could be made to travel at a much higher speed. He also proposed a novel hull structure which would have allowed greater depths to be reached, and the use of gas turbine engines in a submarine, using liquid oxygen. In the end, nothing came of Wallis's submarine ideas. During the 1960s and into his retirement, he developed ideas for an "all-speed" aircraft, capable of efficient flight at all speed ranges from subsonic to hypersonic.

In the late 1950s, Wallis gave a lecture titled "The strength of England" at Eton College, and continued to deliver versions of the talk into the early 1970s, presenting technology and automation as a way to restore Britain's dominance. He advocated nuclear-powered cargo submarines as a means of making Britain immune to future embargoes, and to make it a global trading power. He complained of the loss of aircraft design to the United States, and suggested that Britain could dominate air travel by developing a small supersonic airliner capable of short take-off and landing.

== Honours and awards ==
Wallis became a Fellow of the Royal Society in 1945, was knighted in 1968, and received an honorary doctorate from Heriot-Watt University in 1969.

== Charity work ==
Wallis was awarded £10,000 for his war work from the Royal Commission on Awards to Inventors. His grief at the loss of so many airmen in the dams raid was such that Wallis donated the entire sum to his alma mater Christ's Hospital School in 1951 to allow them to set up the RAF Foundationers' Trust, assisting the children of RAF personnel killed or injured in action to attend the school. Around this time he also became an almoner of Christ's Hospital. When he retired from aeronautical work in 1957, he was appointed Treasurer and Chairman of the Council of Almoners of Christ's Hospital, holding the post of Treasurer for nearly 13 years. During this time he oversaw its major reconstruction.

Wallis was an active member of the Royal Air Forces Association, the charity that supports the RAF community.

== Personal life ==
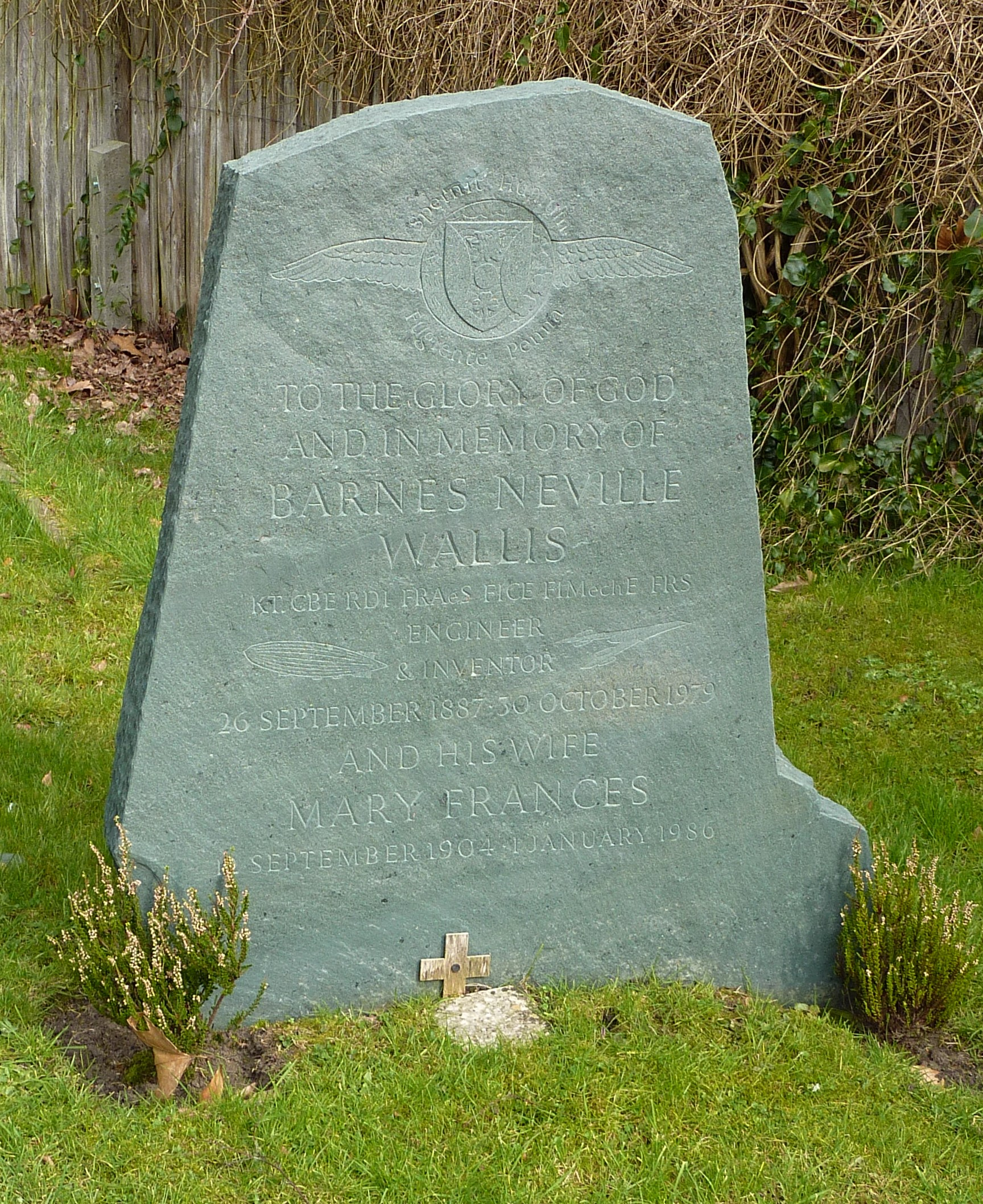
Wallis's grave at St. Lawrence Church, Effingham, Surrey, pictured in 2013

In April 1922, Wallis met his cousin-in-law, Molly Bloxam, at a family tea party. She was 17 and he was 34, and her father forbade them from courting. He allowed Wallis to assist Molly with her mathematics courses by correspondence, and they wrote some 250 letters, enlivening them with fictional characters such as "Duke Delta X". The letters gradually became personal, and Wallis proposed marriage on her 20th birthday. They were married on 23 April 1925, and remained so for 54 years until his death in 1979.

For 49 years, from 1930 until his death, Wallis lived with his family in Effingham, Surrey, and he is now buried at the local St. Lawrence Church together with his wife. His epitaph in Latin reads "Spernit Humum Fugiente Penna" (Severed from the earth with fleeting wing), a quotation from Horace Ode III.2.

They had four children – Barnes (1926–2008), Mary (1927–2019), Elisabeth (b. 1933) and Christopher (1935–2006) – and also adopted Molly's sister's children John and Robert McCormick when their parents were killed in an air raid. His daughter Mary Eyre Wallis later married Harry Stopes-Roe, a son of Marie Stopes. His son Christopher Loudon Wallis was instrumental in the restoration of the watermill and its building on the Stanway Estate near Cheltenham, Gloucestershire. Wallis was a vegetarian and an advocate of animal rights. He became a vegetarian at age 73.

== In film and fiction ==
In the 1955 film The Dam Busters, Wallis was played by Michael Redgrave. Wallis's daughter Elisabeth played the camera technician in the water tank sequence. Wallis and his development of the bouncing bomb are mentioned by Charles Gray in the 1969 film Mosquito Squadron. Wallis appears as a fictionalised character in Stephen Baxter's The Time Ships (though its birth date is not the same, 1883 instead of 1887, since he says he was eight when the Time Traveller first used his machine), the authorised sequel to The Time Machine. He is portrayed as a British engineer in an alternate history, where the First World War does not end in 1918, and Wallis concentrates his energies on developing a machine for time travel. As a consequence, it is the Germans who develop the bouncing bomb. His character and the Second World War research lab are featured in the mystery British television series Foyle's War (Series four, part 2). In Scarlet Traces: The Great Game by Ian Edginton, he is responsible for the development of the Cavorite weapon used to win the war on Mars after the departure of Cavor.

== Memorials ==
Plaques and sculptures

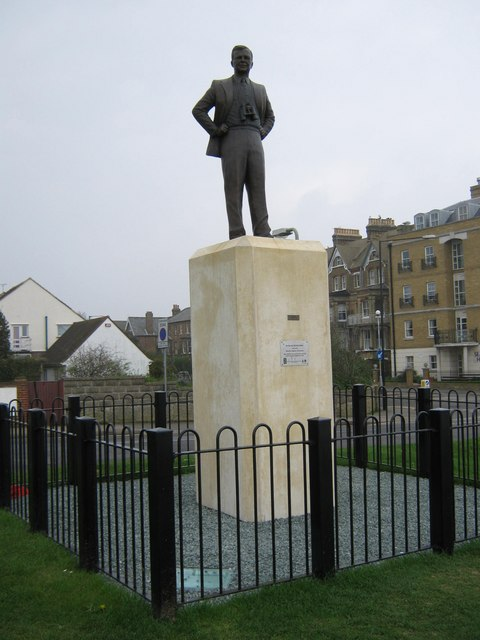
Statue of Barnes Wallis in Herne Bay, Kent, near the site of the bouncing bomb tests

- There is a statue to Wallis, created by American sculptor Tom White in 2008, in Herne Bay, Kent. It is a short distance from Reculver where the bouncing bomb was tested.
- A Red Wheel heritage plaque commemorating Wallis's contribution as "Designer of airships, aeroplanes, the 'Bouncing Bomb' and swing-wing aircraft" was erected by the Transport Trust at Wallis's birthplace in Ripley, Derbyshire, on 31 May 2009.
- A Lewisham Council plaque is located at 241 New Cross Road in New Cross, London, where Wallis lived from 1892 to 1909.
- A plaque by the main entrance to the former Vickers (now BAE Systems) works in Barrow in Furness, where he was Chief Designer for Vickers Ltd Airship Department.
- A Hillingdon Council memorial is located in Moor Lane, Harmondsworth, at the site where the Road Research Laboratory conducted tests on model dams to assist Barnes Wallis in his development of the bouncing bomb.
- Sculpted busts of Wallis are held by Brooklands Museum and the RAF Club at Piccadilly, London.

Buildings

- The Student Union Building on the University of Manchester North Campus (previously UMIST) is named in Wallis's honour; he was awarded lifetime membership of the Students' Union in 1967.
- Nottingham Trent University also has a building named after Wallis, on Goldsmith Street.
- QinetiQ's site in Farnborough, Hampshire, includes a building named in Wallis's honour, the former site of the Royal Aircraft Establishment.
- A public house named after Sir Barnes Wallis was located in the town of his birth, Ripley, Derbyshire, before being demolished in January 2022.
- A public house named The Barnes Wallis stood for many years near the railway station in Howden, East Riding of Yorkshire. Wallis was involved in airship work at the airship sheds near Howden in the early part of the 20th century. The building is now a private residence.

Street names

- There is a Barnes Wallis Drive in Byfleet in Surrey within the former Brooklands aerodrome and motor circuit, also Barnes Wallis Close, Effingham, Surrey, not far from where he lived.
- Additionally, Barnes Wallis Close in Chickerell, Weymouth, which is within sight of the Fleet Lagoon bounded by Chesil Beach, where Wallis tested the bouncing bomb, and also a Barnes Road which is off Wallis Street in Bradford, West Yorkshire.
- There is a Barnes Wallis Close in Bowerhill, Melksham, Wiltshire.
- There is also a Barnes Wallis Drive in Apley in Telford, Shropshire, and Segensworth in Hampshire.
- Barnes Wallis Avenue at Christ's Hospital.
- Barnes Wallis Way in Churchdown, Gloucestershire.
- In Buckshaw Village, Lancashire, a housing estate built on the site of an old Royal Ordnance Factory, a road is named Barnes Wallis Way.
- A housing estate on the site of RFC Marske in the North Yorkshire village of Marske-by-the-Sea is named after Wallis.

Other

- The Yorkshire Air Museum at Elvington near York has a permanent display of the Dambusters raid including a replica bouncing bomb and the catapult used to skim stones to test the bouncing bomb theory. A brief history of Wallis's work is also part of the display.
- The Scafell Hotel in Rosthwaite, Keswick, has a Barnes Wallis Suite; the hotel was a favourite holiday retreat of his.
- The RAF Manston History Museum, Kent, features a section on Operation Chastise (The Dams Raid) and includes one of the few recovered practice 'Bouncing Bombs' that were tested on a sea range near Herne Bay by Lancaster bombers temporarily based at RAF Manston Airfield.
- Wallis is one of the 100 Great Britons selected in 2002 via a BBC television series

== Archives ==
The Science Museum at Wroughton, near Swindon, holds 105 boxes of papers of Barnes Wallis. The papers comprise design notes, photographs, calculations, correspondence and reports relating to Wallis's work on airships, including the R100; geodetic construction of aircraft; the bouncing bomb and deep penetration bombs; the "Wild Goose" and "Swallow" swing-wing aircraft; hypersonic aircraft designs and various outside contracts.

Two boxes of records, containing copies of key aeronautical papers written between 1940 and 1958, are held at the Churchill Archives Centre in Cambridge.

Other Barnes Wallis papers are also held at Brooklands Museum, the Imperial War Museum, London, Newark Air Museum, Trinity College, Cambridge, and Bristol, Leeds and Oxford universities and the Royal Air Force Museum in Hendon which has a reconstruction of his postwar office at Brooklands.
