= Vickers Wild Goose =

US unmanned aerial vehicle

Wild Goose

General information
- Type: Research UAV
- Manufacturer: Vickers
- Designer: Barnes Wallis
- Number built: 6+

History
- First flight: 1950
- Developed into: Vickers Swallow

Wild Goose was a research unmanned aerial vehicle (UAV) developed and flown by designer Barnes Wallis for his research into tailless variable-sweep aircraft incorporating a radical new control system and capable of high-speed, long-range performance.

== Development ==
After World War II, designer Barnes Wallis turned his attention from bombs back to aircraft. He undertook a fundamental review of the technology required for high-speed, long-distance flight and concluded that a tailless variable-sweep wing offered major advantages over conventional designs. A major part of this advantage was a radical revision of the flight control system. Control would primarily be effected by moving the wings in flight, avoiding the need for conventional control surfaces or tail. The change was so radical that he even proposed that it should no longer be thought of as an aeroplane but as a new type of flying machine, which he called a wing-controlled aerodyne.

Wallis named the project Wild Goose. His employer Vickers was not able to sponsor such a large-scale project, so the variable-sweep wing anti-aircraft missile Green Lizard was proposed and Wild Goose positioned as necessary preliminary research in order to obtain government funding. By 1949 he was ready to build a large-scale radio-controlled flying model.

== Design ==
The wing-controlled aerodyne, as Wallis called his concept, was aerodynamically extremely clean. It comprised a streamlined ichthyoid (fish-like) body with mid-mounted movable wings on either side. He had learned from his work on the stability of airships such as the R100 that such a streamlined body needed only a small deflection to create large control forces. In the wing-controlled aerodyne, these forces are created by moving the whole wing. Conventional control surfaces including ailerons and elevators were not needed. However Wild Goose, his first large-scale design, was given a swept vertical tail fin.

The launching trolley and radio control system proved more complex and Wallis spent more time on these than on the actual airframe. The trolley was rocket-powered and ran on rails. Early problems with separation for flight led to a doubling of rocket power and a late-release system so that the Wild Goose leaped upward when released, beyond the reach of aerodynamic interactions with the airflow around the trolley.

== Operational history ==
Wild Goose was to be launched from a powered trolley. Teething troubles led to the first two examples crashing on takeoff. The first successful flight came with the third example on 19 January 1950, however the remote pilot crashed it when attempting to land. The next one lasted until 29 April 1952, when it was accidentally flown into a concrete wall after demonstrating that National Physical Laboratory predictions of poor handling were unfounded and vindicating the revolutionary aerodynamics and control system. Further tests and crashes followed, with the project being terminated in 1954 when the military lost interest in the Green Lizard missile to be derived from it.

By this time Vickers had begun studies on a successor to the Valiant V-bomber and for this Wallis was evolving his Wild Goose design into the Swallow.
