= Vickers Swallow =

British supersonic aircraft project

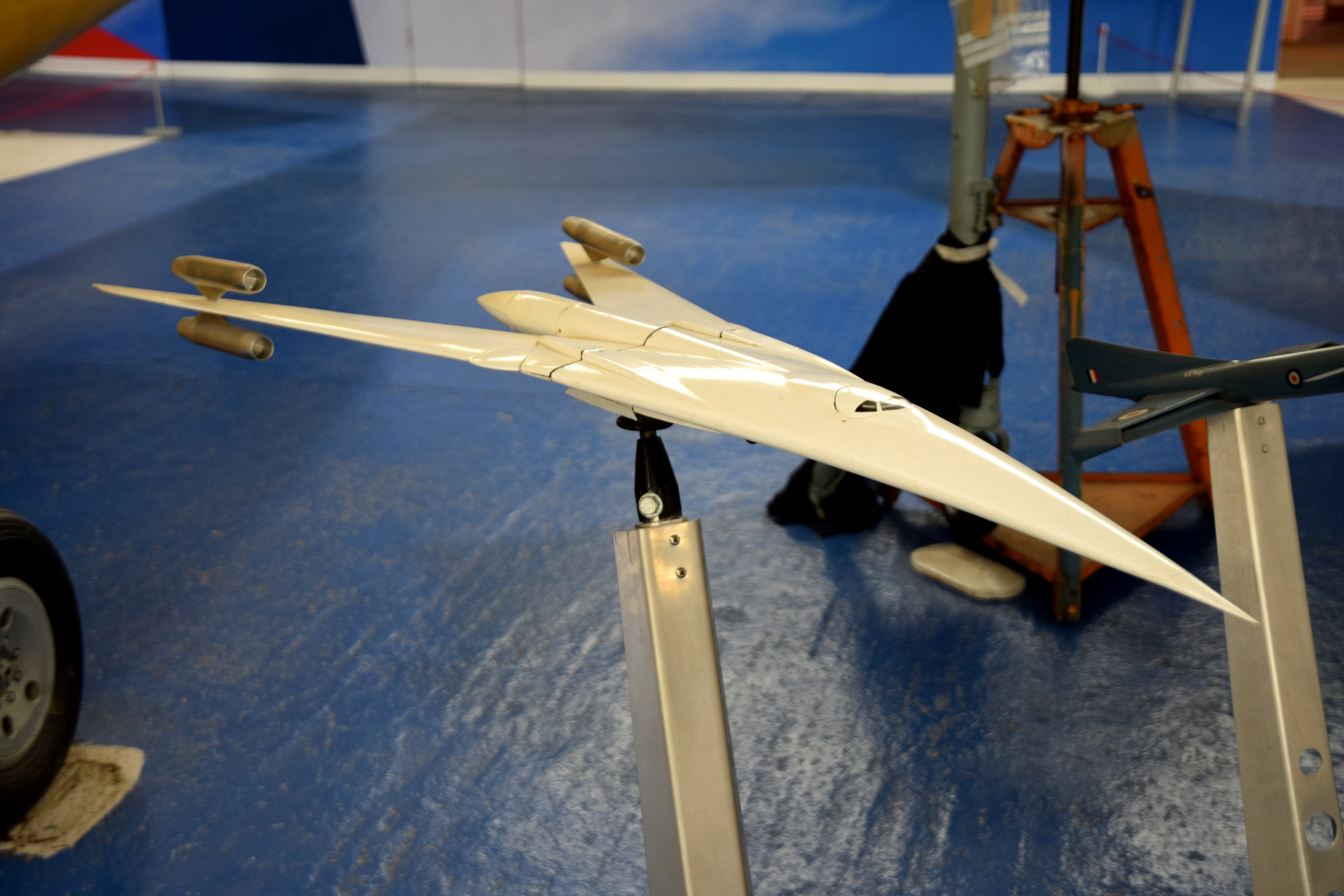
Swallow Type 010 model at Royal Air Force Museum Cosford

The Vickers Swallow was a supersonic aircraft project headed by Barnes Wallis, working at the British aircraft company Vickers-Armstrongs. It was a wing-controlled aerodyne, controlled in flight by movement of the entire wing, and was the supersonic successor to the Wild Goose project.

Several remotely piloted vehicles were built and flown for research purposes in addition to ground testing of static models. A conceptual full-scale aircraft was envisioned as a long-distance airliner and, later on, as a potential supersonic successor to the Vickers Valiant, a subsonic V bomber then in service with the Royal Air Force. The project was cancelled in 1957 following the withdrawal of government backing.

== Development ==
In the years following the Second World War, there was significant interest in developing a new generation of aircraft designs based upon knowledge acquired during the conflict. British engineer and inventor Barnes Wallis, a long term employee of the aircraft company Vickers-Armstrongs, took a particular interest in the field of variable-sweep wings and the potential of advanced wing designs. During this work, Wallis conceived of an aircraft which lacked conventional features, such as a vertical stabiliser and rudder, instead using the movement of variable geometry wings as its primary means of flight control.

Wallis' concept attracted interest within the British government; the Ministry of Supply and Ministry of Defence jointly arranged for a series of tests to demonstrate the technology's application upon projectiles, both for research purposes and a potential form of anti-aircraft defence; while Wallis worked upon this research programme, he continued to promote the concept of a manned variable geometry aircraft.

Out of this research, Wallis produced a new aircraft design, equipped with a moveable delta wing configuration and relatively large compared with traditional long distance aircraft of the era. It was commonly referred to by the name Swallow. Multiple roles were envisioned for the full-scale Swallow. It was initially viewed as suitable for a very long distance airliner; projections of its range would have enabled a non-stop UK-Australia route to be served. Later on, the Swallow was increasingly viewed as a potential supersonic successor to the subsonic Vickers Valiant, one of the RAF's V bombers.

During 1951, the Ministry of Supply issued Specification ER.110T, which sought a piloted variable geometry aircraft that would be suitable for research flights; however, ER.110T would be cancelled without any order having ever been placed due to other pressing operational demands. Around this time, another opportunity for a variable geometry design was presented in the form of Specification OR.330, which sought a supersonic aerial reconnaissance/strategic bomber aircraft for the Royal Air Force (RAF).

By the summer of 1956, a series of flying models had been flown and data gathered from flight tests; this information had reportedly resolved all of the Swallow's technical problems; by this time, however, government interest was fading in light of other commitments. Vickers was unable to independently finance its development through to a full-size aircraft. During June 1957, Ministry funding for the venture was withdrawn; accordingly, formal work on the project ceased during that same year.

Despite the termination, Swallow continued to attract attention internationally. During late 1958, research efforts were temporarily revived through cooperation with the Mutual Weapons Development Programme of NATO, under which all of Wallis' variable geometry research was shared with the Americans. According to aviation author James R. Hansen, American aerospace engineer John Stack was enthusiastic on the concept, as were numerous engineers at NASA; however, the United States Department of Defense was opposed to committing any resources to the project. Research into Swallow produced several new configurations aimed at improving aspects of its performance, some involved the adoption of a compact folding tail section, canards, an expanded fuselage, and repositioned engines. While the concept drew the attention of the United States Navy, competing programmes, such as the supersonic transport (SST), led to no commitments ever being made, thus Swallow did not go any further.
