= Geodetic (disambiguation) =

Geodesy is the Earth science of accurately measuring and understanding Earth's figure.

Geodetic may also refer to:

- Geodetic Hills, mountains in Canada
- Geodetic Glacier, glacier in Antarctica
- Geodetic graph, a type of graph
- Geodetic effect, a prediction of general relativity

== See also ==
- Geodesic (disambiguation)
