= Geodesic (disambiguation) =

A geodesic is a curve representing in some sense the shortest path between two points on a surface.

Geodesic may also refer to:

- Geodesic (general relativity), generalization of the notion of a "straight line" to curved spacetime
- An adjective meaning "related to geodesy", the Earth science of accurately measuring and understanding Earth's geometric shape
- Geodesic dome, a hemispherical lattice-shell structure made from triangles, the shape of which is called a geodesic polyhedron

== See also ==
- Geodetic (disambiguation)
