= Mikoyan-Gurevich MiG-23 =

Soviet fighter-interceptor aircraft introduced in 1970

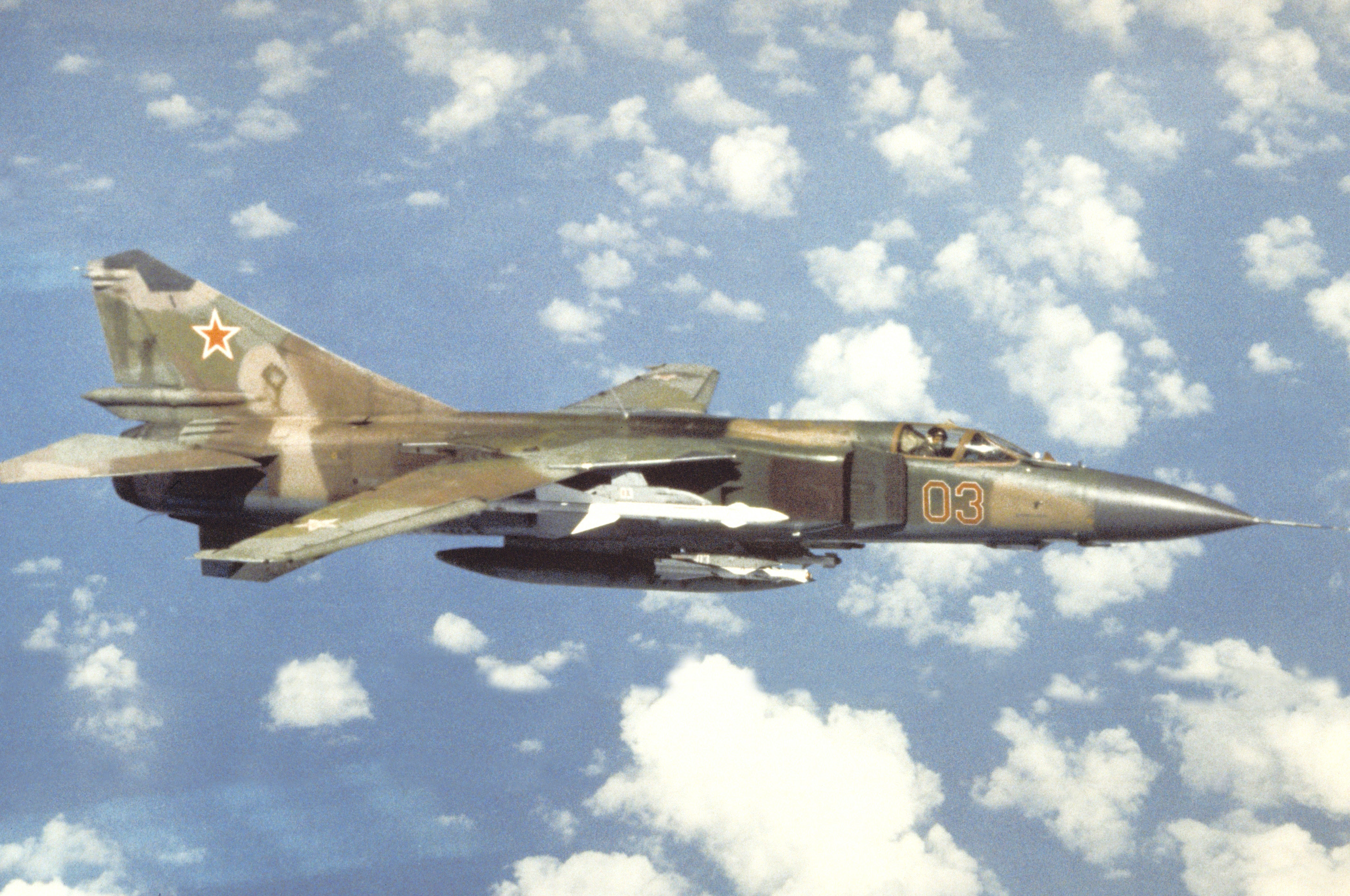
- A Soviet Air Force MiG-23MLD

General information
- Type: Fighter aircraft (M series); Fighter-bomber (B series)
- National origin: Soviet Union
- Manufacturer: Mikoyan-Gurevich / Mikoyan
- Status: In limited service
- Primary users: Soviet Air Force (historical) Syrian Air Force (historical); Indian Air Force (historical); North Korean Air Force
- Number built: 5,047

History
- Manufactured: 1967–1985
- Introduction date: 1970
- First flight: 10 June 1967
- Variant: Mikoyan MiG-27

The Mikoyan-Gurevich MiG-23 (Russian: Микоян и Гуревич МиГ-23; NATO reporting name: Flogger) is a single-engined, supersonic, variable-sweep wing fighter aircraft, designed by the Mikoyan-Gurevich design bureau in the Soviet Union. It is a third-generation jet fighter, alongside similar Soviet aircraft such as the Su-17 "Fitter". It was the first Soviet fighter to field a look-down/shoot-down radar, the RP-23 Sapfir, and one of the first to be armed with beyond-visual-range missiles. Production started in 1969 and reached large numbers with over 5,000 aircraft built, making it the most produced variable-sweep wing aircraft in history. The MiG-23 remains in limited service with some export customers.

The basic design was also used as the basis for the Mikoyan MiG-27, a dedicated ground-attack variant. Among many minor changes, the MiG-27 replaced the MiG-23's nose-mounted radar system with an optical panel holding a laser designator and a TV camera.

== Development ==
The MiG-23's predecessor, the MiG-21, was fast and agile, but limited in its operational capabilities by its primitive radar, short range, and limited weapons load (restricted in some aircraft to a pair of short-range R-3/K-13 (AA-2 "Atoll") air-to-air missiles). Work began on a replacement for the MiG-21 in the early 1960s. The new aircraft was required to have better performance and range than the MiG-21, while carrying more capable avionics and weapons including beyond-visual-range (BVR) missiles such as the R-23R or its successor, the R-24R, both of them being semi-active radar homing (SARH) missiles. A major design consideration was take-off and landing performance. The Soviet Air Force (VVS) demanded the new aircraft have a much shorter take-off run. Low-level speed and handling was also to be improved over the MiG-21. Manoeuvrability was not an urgent requirement. This led Mikoyan to consider two options: lift jets, to provide an additional lift component; and variable-geometry wings, which had been developed by TsAGI for both "clean-sheet" aircraft designs and adaptations of existing designs.

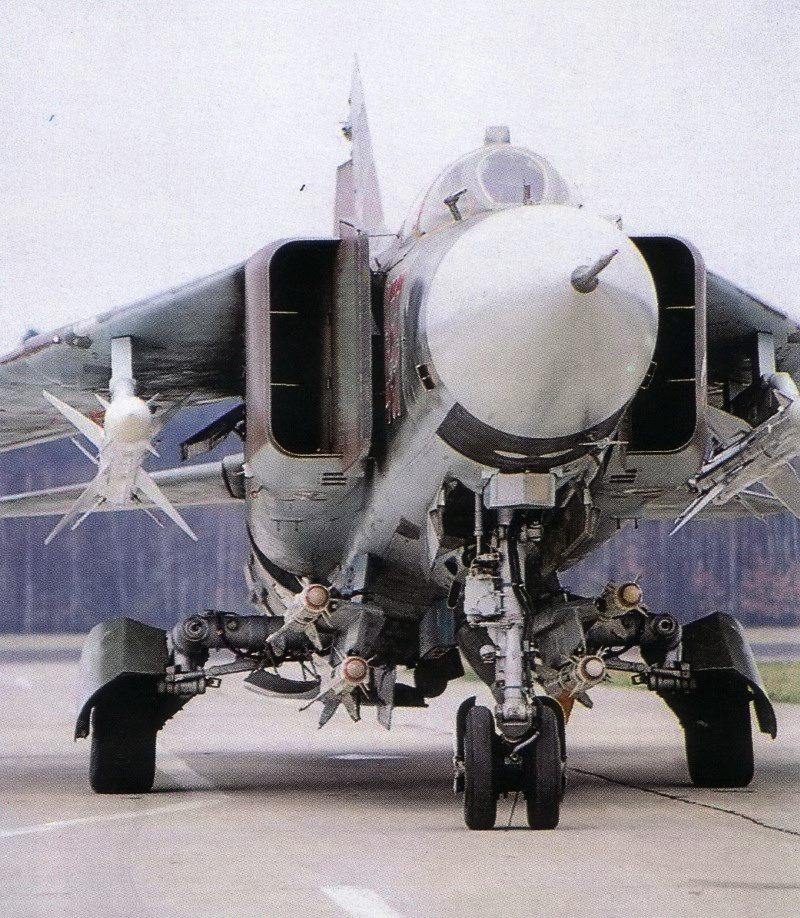
A Polish MiG-23MF

The first option, for an aircraft fitted with lift jets, resulted in the "23-01", also known as the MiG-23PD (Podyomnye Dvigatyeli – lift jet), was a tailed delta of similar layout to the smaller MiG-21 but with two lift jets in the fuselage. This first flew on 3 April 1967, but it soon became apparent that this configuration was unsatisfactory, as the lift jets became useless dead weight once airborne. Work on the second strand of development was carried out in parallel by a team led by A.A Andreyev, with MiG directed to build a variable-geometry prototype, the "23-11" in 1965.

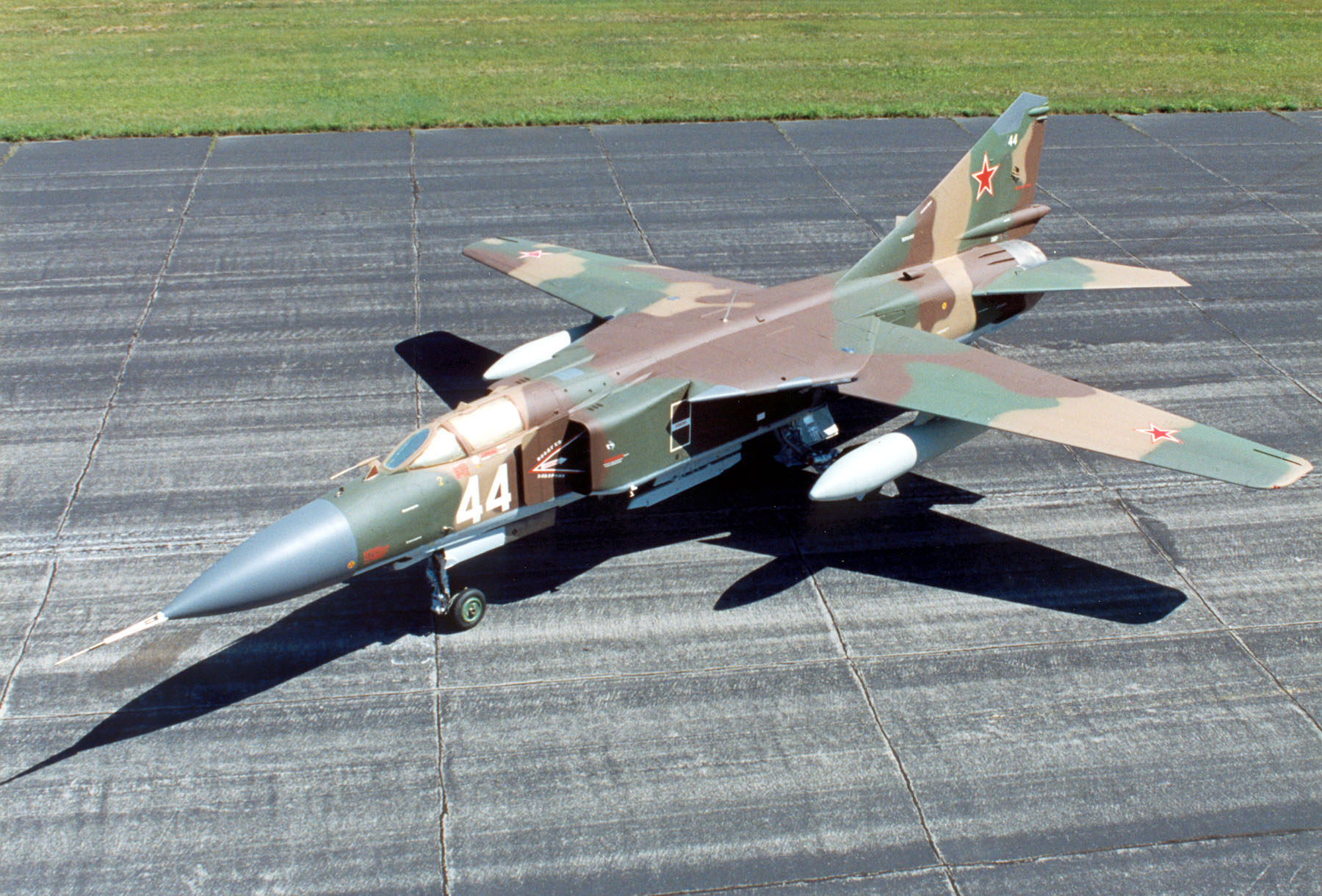
MiG-23 parked

The 23-11 featured variable-geometry wings which could be set to angles of 16, 45 and 72 degrees, and it was clearly more promising. The maiden flight of 23–11 took place on 10 June 1967, flown by the famous MiG test pilot Aleksandr Vasilyevich Fedotov. Six more flight prototypes and two static-test prototypes were prepared for further flight and system testing. All featured the Tumansky R-27-300 turbojet engine with a thrust of 77 kN (17,300 lbf). The order to start series production of the MiG-23 was given in December 1967. The first production "MiG-23S" (NATO reporting name 'Flogger-A') took to the air on 21 May 1969, with Fedotov at the controls.

The General Dynamics F-111 and McDonnell Douglas F-4 Phantom II were the main Western influences on the MiG-23. The Soviets, however, wanted a much lighter, single-engined fighter to maximize agility. Both the F-111 and the MiG-23 were designed as fighters, but the heavy weight and inherent stability of the F-111 turned it into a long-range interdictor and kept it out of the fighter role. The MiG-23's designers kept the MiG-23 light and agile enough to dogfight with enemy fighters.

== Design ==
=== Armament ===
The armament carried by the MiG-23 changed as new models underwent development. The initial production variant, the MiG-23S, was fitted with the S-21 fire control system borrowed from the MiG-21S/SM. Based on the RP-22SM Sapfir-21 radar with an ASP-PFD-21 lead computing gunsight, it could carry only four R-3/K-13 (AA-2 "Atoll") air-to-air missiles (typically two SARH R-3Rs and two IR R-3Ss) in addition to a Gryazev-Shipunov GSh-23L autocannon. In the ground-attack role, the MiG-23S could carry two Kh-23 (AS-7 "Kerry") radio guidance air-to-surface missiles, two to four UB-16 rocket pods with S-5 rockets, S-24 rockets or up to 2,000 kg (4,400 lb) of various bomb types. The MiG-23 Edition 1971, equipped with the Sapfir-23L radar and TP-23 infrared search and track (IRST), could fire the new BVR R-23 (AA-7 "Apex") missile, although only the R-23R SARH variant. However, the Sapfir-23L was considered unreliable and lacked look-down/shoot-down capability.

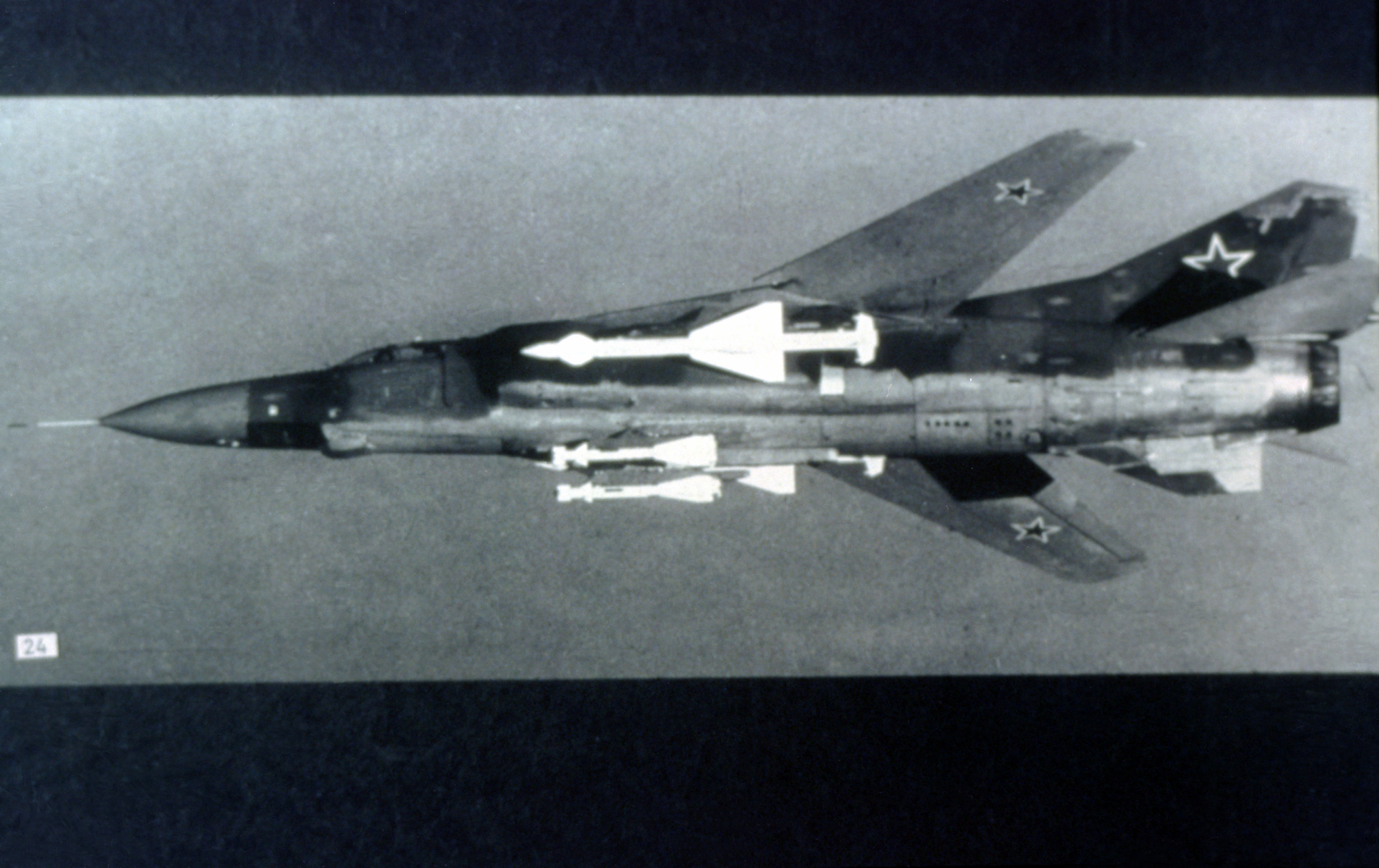
MiG-23M "Flogger-B" armed with R-23 and R-60 missiles

The MiG-23M, the definitive first-generation variant of the fighter, was equipped with the improved Sapfir-23D look-down/shoot-down radar and could carry a pair of R-23 missiles (either the R-23R SARH or R-23T IR variants) and a pair of R-60 (AA-8 "Aphid") missiles. Starting with aircraft number 3201, the APU-60-2 double-rail launcher was introduced, allowing the MiG-23M to carry six R-60 missiles. The MiG-23 could carry up to 3,000 kg (6,600 lb) in bombs and rockets, and from aircraft number 3701 onward it could fire the Kh-23 and Kh-23M air-to-surface missiles. Lastly, all VVS MiG-23Ms had the ability to mount a single nuclear bomb via a special adapter under the fuselage, either the 10-kiloton RN-24 or the 30-kiloton RN-40.

In the second-generation MiG-23ML, a new SUV-2ML weapons system allowed the aircraft to carry both types of R-23 missiles simultaneously. The typical loadout was an R-23R on the starboard wing pylon and an R-23T on the port wing pylon. Besides other ordnance (including a single nuclear bomb), the MiG-23ML could also carry two UPK-23-250 23 mm gun pods on the underwing pylons. Starting in 1981, the MiG-23MLA could carry the improved Vympel R-24R/T missiles. The final fighter variant, the MiG-23MLD, could also carry the improved R-24R/T missiles in addition to a pair of B8M1 20-round rocket pods firing S-8 rockets, the Kh-23/Kh-23M air-to-surface missile, or a single RN-24 or RN-40 nuclear bomb. The MiG-23MLD's maximum bomb load was 2,000 kg (4,400 lb), with a standard loadout comprising four FAB-500 500 kg (1,100 lb) general-purpose bombs (GP) or ZAB-500 napalm bombs. Other configurations included sixteen FAB-100 100 kg (220 lb) GP bombs carried on four ejector racks, four FAB-250 250 kg (550 lb) GP bombs, or two RBK-500 cluster bombs.

=== Cockpit ===
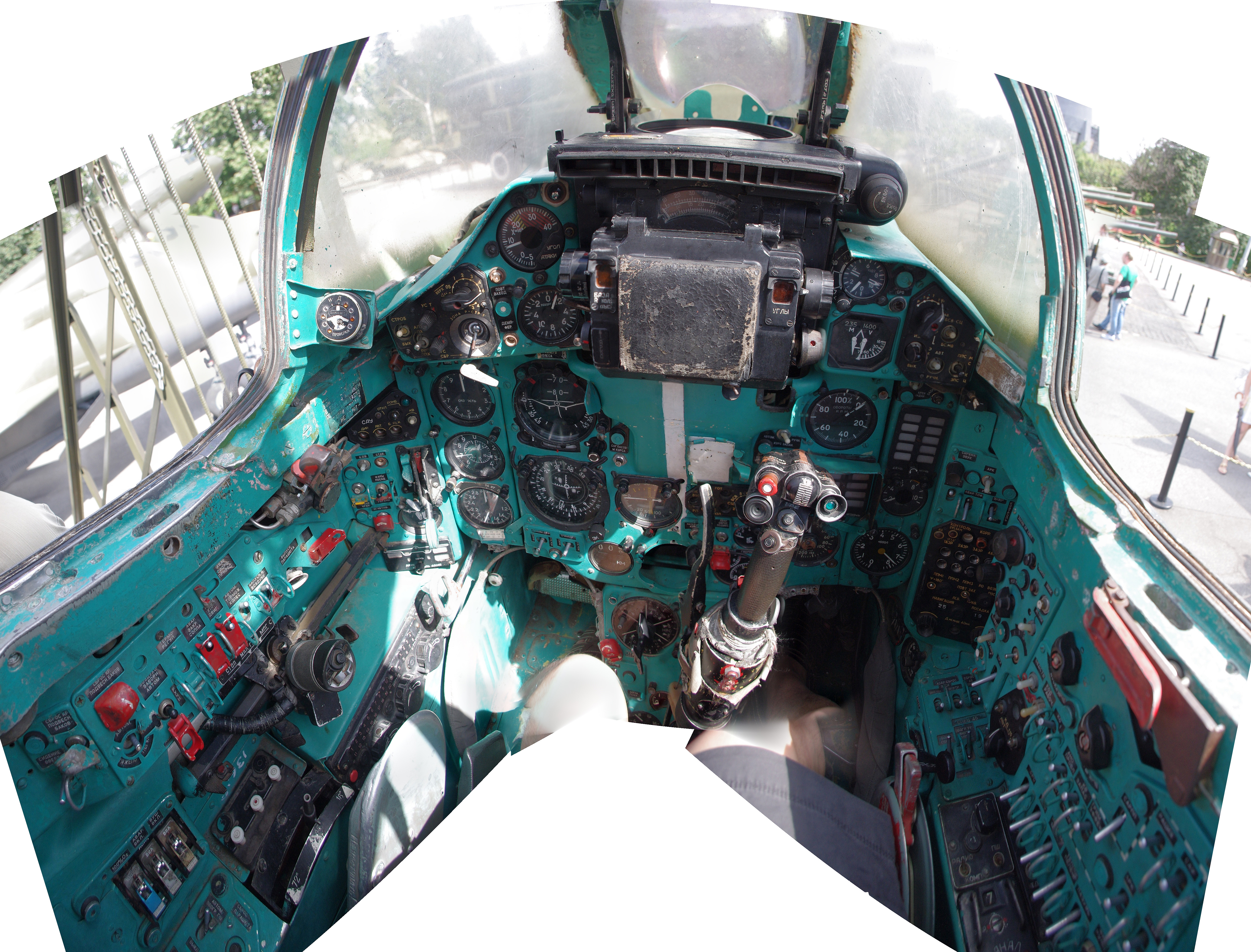
MiG-23 cockpit in high resolution

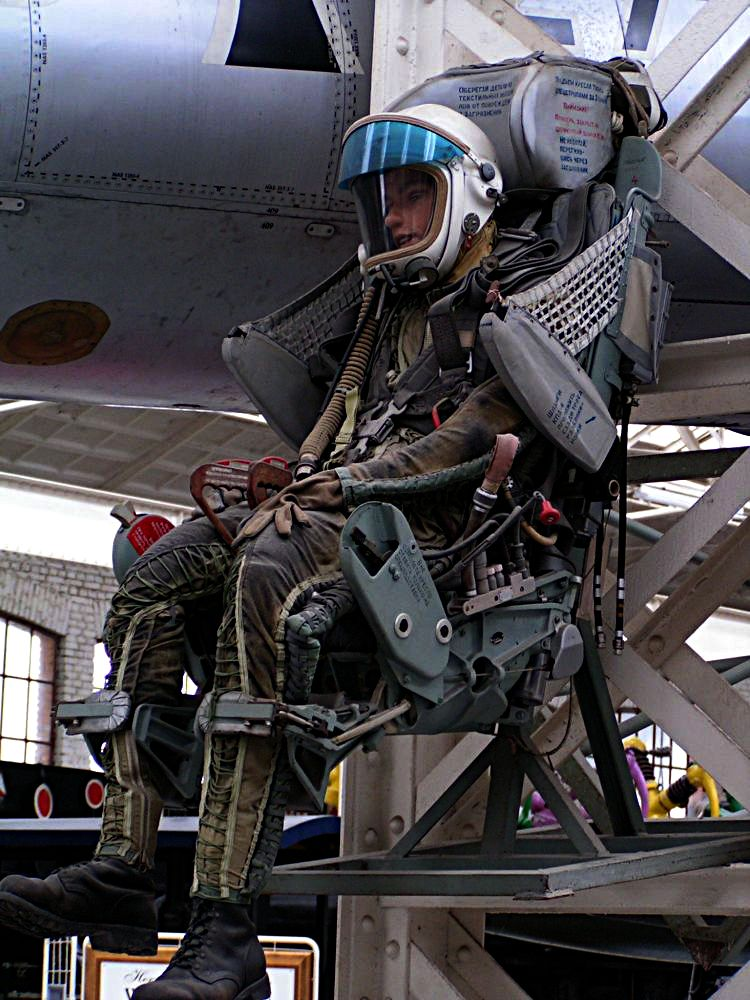
KM-1 ejection seat

The MiG-23 cockpit was considered an improvement over previous Soviet fighters as it was more ergonomic in its layout. However the pilot still had a high workload, having to manipulate switches and monitor gauges, compared to more modern aircraft with HOTAS controls. The instrument panel featured a white stripe to serve as a visual aid for centering the control column during an out-of-control situation. To prevent the pilot from exceeding a 17° angle of attack, the control column incorporated a "knuckle rapper" which would strike the pilot's knuckles as the limit was approached.

Cockpit visibility was also somewhat poor in the MiG-23, although the view straight ahead was superior compared to the MiG-21. In particular, visibility was poor looking to the rear, partially due to the ejection seat which wrapped around the pilot's head, requiring the pilot to lean forward to look to the side or behind. To assist with looking directly behind the pilot, the cockpit was fitted with a mirror or 'periscope' embedded in the middle rail of the canopy, similar to the one on the MiG-17. With an infinity focus, the periscope provided a clear view of behind the plane, but did not have a wide field of view.

The MiG-23's ejection seat, the KM-1, was built with extreme altitude and speed in mind: leg stirrups, shoulder harness, pelvic D-ring, and a 3-parachute system. Engaging the ejection seat could take a long time, as the pilots had to place their feet in the stirrups, let go of the control column, grab the two trigger handles, squeeze and lift them. The first parachute, the size of a large handkerchief, was deployed out of a telescoping rod which would pop out of the top back of the seat as it started to clear the windscreen windbreak area. It was supposed to help rotate the seat into the windblast and stabilize into a flight path that would take it above and behind the vertical stabilizer. As the first chute and rod separated from the seat, a larger drogue parachute deployed to slow down the seat, allowing the deployment of the main parachute. If engaged at low altitudes, the seat included a barometric element that allowed the drogue chute to separate more quickly. One deficiency of the KM-1 was that it was not a zero-zero ejection seat – it required a minimum speed of 90 knots.

Starting with the MiG-23 Edition 1971, the MiG-23 replaced the head-down radar scope with an ASP-23D gunsight/head-up display (HUD) onto which data from the radar was displayed. This was updated in the MiG-23MLA with the ASP-17ML gunsight/HUD. Because information from the radar had to fit on the combining glass of the HUD, the amount of space that could be scanned was limited to a relatively thin slice. This required that the fighter be flown very close to the target's altitude and well ahead of it to be picked up, necessitating good ground-controlled interception (GCI) instructions. Israeli pilots who flew captured versions of the MiG-23 found it relatively easy to use.

=== Control surfaces ===
The MiG-23 was among the first Soviet aircraft to feature variable-geometry wings. These were hydraulically controlled by means of a small lever set beneath the throttle in the cockpit. There were three main sweep angles that were set by the pilot for different levels of flying. The first, with the wings fully spread at 16°, was used when cruising at or below Mach 0.7 or when taking off and landing. Putting the wings at mid-spread of 45° was used for basic fighter maneuvering, as well as cruising at high speeds or making low-altitude intercepts. Moving the wings to fully swept at 72° was reserved for making high-altitude intercepts or high-speed dashes at low altitudes.

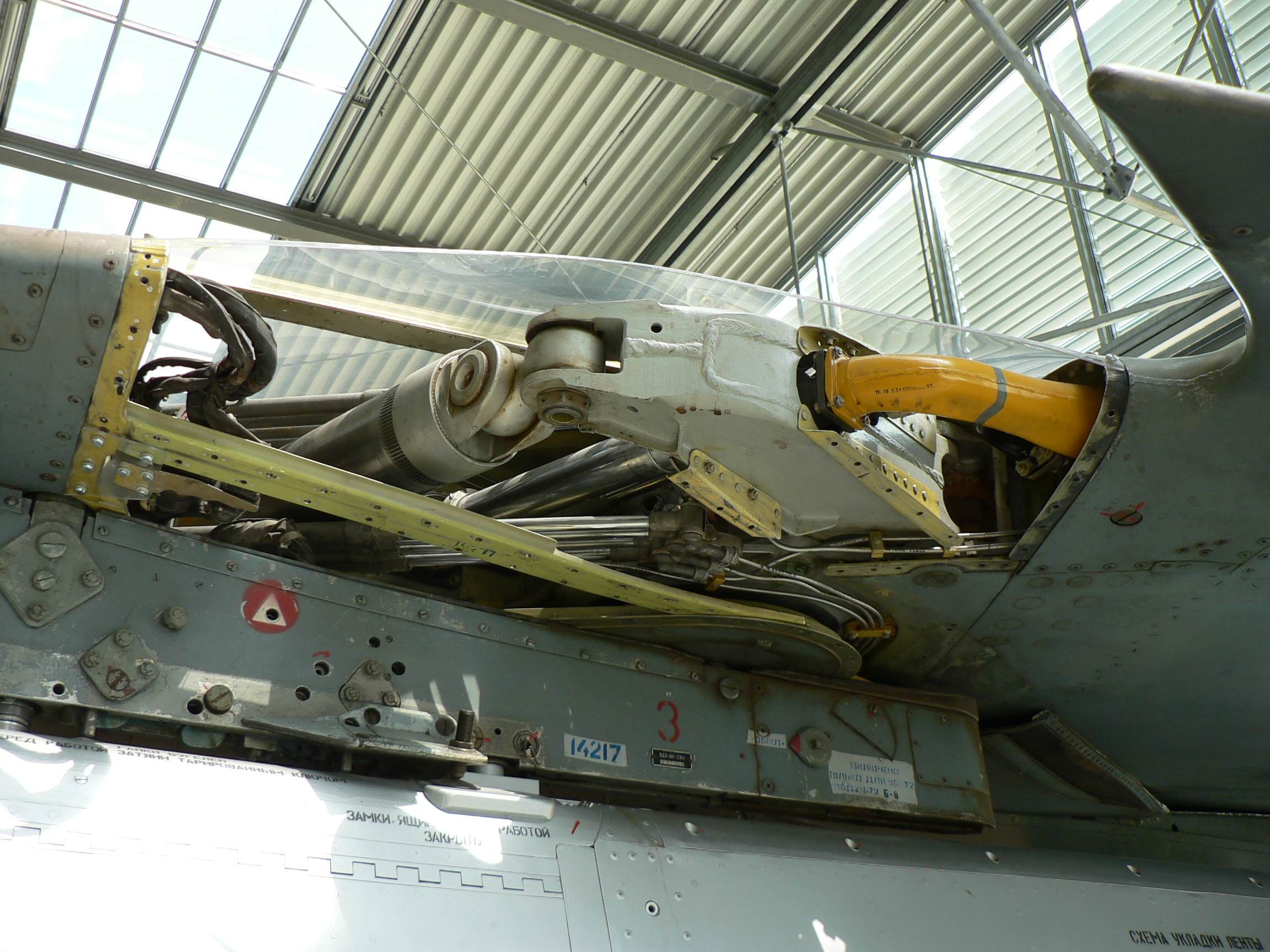
MiG-23 wing-sweep mechanism

The wings were not fitted with ailerons but used spoilers to control rolling when the wings were at 16° and 45° angles. In addition to the spoilers, the wings were fitted with trailing edge flaps and leading edge slats to try to give the fighter a short take-off and landing performance. Although there was a gauge in the cockpit showing the position of the wings, when they were in motion, and the Mach limit for each position, there was none to indicate what was the optimum wing position for the prevailing flight condition.

Two tailerons controlled pitch and roll, in the latter case working in conjunction with wing control surfaces when the wings were not fully swept back. In addition to a large vertical stabilizer (which also stored the brake parachute for landings), the MiG-23 had a ventral fin to improve directional stability at high speeds. During take-off and landing, the fin hinged sideways when the landing gear was extended to prevent it striking the ground.

Starting with the Edition 1971 model, the MiG-23's wings (known as Edition 2) had their surface area increased by 20%, necessitating the positions be changed to 18°, 47° 40', and 74° 40' (though for convenience the cockpit indicators and manuals retained the original labeling). A dogtooth extension was added but the leading-edge slats were removed to simplify manufacturing. However this proved to exacerbate the MiG-23's stability issues at high AoA and made take-off and landings more difficult. The definitive Edition 3 wing design, introduced with the MiG-23M, retained the dimensions of the Edition 2 but added back in the leading-edge slats.

A strengthening of the wing pivot in the MiG-23MLD allowed the addition of a fourth wing sweep position of 33°, which was intended to reduce turn radius and allow for rapid deceleration during dogfights. However, with the wings at the 33° position, the MiG-23MLD was much more difficult to handle and suffered from poor acceleration. Moving the wings to this position was primarily reserved for experienced MiG-23 pilots, while combat manuals continued to emphasize the 45° position.

=== Engine ===
The MiG-23's original engine was a 122 kN (12,500 kgf; 27,500 lbf) thrust Tumansky R-29-300 with thrust to spare at the aircraft top speed of Mach 2.4. It also had a fast acceleration time, taking 3–4 seconds to go from idle to full power, and took less than a second to ignite the afterburner. The aircraft's placarded top speed was set by cockpit canopy structural strength. The engine intake had louvers which supplied the environmental control system with air to keep the avionics and pilot cool.

Similar to early examples of the F-4 Phantom's J-79 engine, the R-29 would generate smoke when operating without the afterburner. The engine outer cases ran very hot, which sometimes triggered false fire alarms. Moreover, the engine was good for only a couple of hundred sorties at most before requiring replacement. This was partly because Russian engines were designed to last about 150 hours before being replaced. It was also a way to generate income from export customers by selling them new engines in exchange for hard currency. Changing an engine was difficult because the aircraft had to be separated in the middle.

The engine was also a weak point on early models of the MiG-23 as it was not stressed for high yaw manoeuvre loads. If the fighter entered a spin, the engine shaft could bend. Compressor blades would rub sending debris into the turbine causing turbine blades to break off, destroying the engine. Introduction of the R-29B-300 addressed this design deficiency.

=== Fuel ===
The prototype version of the MiG-23 carried three fuel tanks in the fuselage, with capacities of 1,920, 820 and 710 litres (510, 220 and 190 US gal) respectively. Additionally, each wing carried three integral fuel tanks of 62.5, 137.5 and 200 litres (16.5, 36.3 and 52.8 US gal). The No. 2 fuel tank in the fuselage also functioned as the aircraft's carry-through wingbox and was welded together with thick plates of VNS-2 steel alloy. The MiG-23 Edition 1971 redesign allowed for a fourth tank carrying 470 litres (120 US gal) to be fitted in the rear of the fuselage. This fuel capacity gave the MiG-23 better endurance than a "clean" F-4 (carrying no drop tanks); if traveling at the MiG-23's endurance speed of 230 knots an individual sortie could be stretched out to an hour, though if the afterburner was used that could fall down to around 45 minutes or less. Introduced with the MiG-23M were plumbed pylons under the movable wing panels which could be fitted with 800-litre (210 US gal) drop tanks, though these could only be carried with the wings at full spread and had to be jettisoned otherwise, and a third 800-liter (210 US gal) drop tank could be carried under the fuselage on the MiG-23ML.

Early models of the MiG-23 ran into problems with the plane's No. 2 fuel tank suffering structural failures, which were especially problematic as the tanks were integral to the structure rather than contained within a fuel bladder. This meant that as the structure developed hairline fractures fuel would seep out. This eventually forced severe g-force limits until a solution could be found. Prior to quality being improved in later models, one fix was to weld a plate on the inside surface and a stiffener on the outer skin.

=== Performance tests ===
Most potential enemies of the USSR and its client states have had opportunities to evaluate the MiG-23's performance. In the summer of 1977, after a political realignment by its government, Egypt provided a number of MiG-23MSs and MiG-23BNs to the United States; these were evaluated under a pair of exploitation programs codenamed HAVE PAD and HAVE BOXER respectively. These and other MiGs, including additional MiG-23s acquired from other sources, were used as part of a secret training program known as project Constant Peg to familiarize American pilots with Soviet aircraft. Additionally, a Cuban pilot flew a MiG-23BN to the U.S. in 1991, and a Libyan MiG-23 pilot also defected to Greece in 1981. In both cases, the aircraft were later repatriated.

Initially, American intelligence on the MiG-23 assumed that the fighter could turn well and had reasonable acceleration capability, but testing during HAVE PAD proved this assumption to be incorrect. While its turning capability was comparable to an original F-4E Phantom, newer American fighters like the F-15 Eagle or F-4E upgraded with slats could easily out-turn the MiG-23 in a dogfight. In fact, whenever the MiG-23 approached high angle of attack it became very unstable and liable to depart controlled flight. Conversely, the MiG-23's acceleration capability was tremendous, particularly at low altitudes (below 10,000 ft or 3,000 m) and crossing the sound barrier, where it could out-accelerate any American fighter. The fighter's small profile gave it the advantage of being hard to spot visually as well. Overall, HAVE PAD testing determined that the MiG-23 - while a poor dogfighter - made for a good interceptor capable of performing hit-and-run attacks. Despite its limitations, in the hands of a very capable pilot the MiG-23 represented a serious threat in air combat.

Test pilots who flew the MiG-23 as part of Constant Peg came to similar conclusions about the MiG-23 being an effective interceptor rather than a dogfighter, but were more critical of the planes they flew. Among their complaints was that the MiG-23's airframe was too easily overstressed; that it was unstable in yaw as it passed the sound barrier and again when approaching Mach 2; that its narrow landing gear, although designed to be used on unprepared surfaces, tended to slip and slide in adverse weather conditions; and because it sat low to the ground, it could more easily suck debris into its engine intakes. In general the MiG-23 was unpopular with the American pilots because it was so dangerous to fly.

Among the nicknames the Constant Peg pilots had for the MiG-23 was the "Looping Hog" because it flew like a pig and one of the few basic fighter maneuvers (BFM) it could pull off in a dogfight was a massive loop. If going fast enough, a MiG-23 could easily perform a loop 6.4 kilometres (4 mi) high that other planes would struggle to follow, at the bottom of which it would cut back inside them and proceed to fly off until outside their visual range so it could come back in again. The only other BFM the MiG-23 could perform, according to Col (ret.) John "Sax" Saxman, was the "no circle fight": as the two aircraft approached and passed close by each other the MiG-23, instead of trying to turn one way or the other with the enemy aircraft (as in a one-circle or two-circle fight), would speed on ahead until it could come back into the fight from a different angle.

The MiG-23's deficits and qualities were also recognized by allied air forces which received the fighter from the Soviet Union, including the East German Air Force:

I spent a lot of time in Berlin watching GCI tapes to verify we were flying the right tactics, and it became clear to me that the East Germans knew exactly what the MiG-23's limitations were. They knew that since it was unmaneuverable, they had to attack from many different directions as fast as possible. It was sophisticated, and they were going to overwhelm us if we ever went up against them. I sat down with some analysts and linguists and listened to what the pilots were saying to their GCI controllers and I actually started to respect them for what they were doing with a very limited asset.

— Cdr (ret.) Marty Macy, 4477th Test and Evaluation Squadron

The pilots of Constant Peg sought to teach these and other aspects of the MiG-23 to the frontline Tactical Air Command squadrons (nicknamed Blue Air) against whom they trained:

We taught the guys that if you were defensive with a Flogger right behind you, then you were automatically offensive, because even the worst pilot in the world would be able to deny him the shot. You would turn, he would try and turn with you, but he would never be able to turn the same corner as you.

— Col (ret.) Paco Geisler, 4477th Test and Evaluation Squadron

One of the MiG-23s would retreat while the other guy would come in behind you. In the training environment the Blue Air pilots would do their intercepts at 350 to 400 knots, so when they all of a sudden get this Flogger coming at Mach 1.5, it really changes the geometry of things. It blows your mind because you are not used to seeing that kind of speed.

— LtCol (USMC ret.) Lenny Bucko, 4477th Test and Evaluation Squadron

The MiG-23's speed in particular was used as a teaching aid for a couple of situations during a potential war with the Soviet Union. The first was at low altitudes to demonstrate its ability to run down any NATO or American strike aircraft (barring the late-model F-111F Aardvark), which would be attempting to go low and fast to penetrate Soviet territory. The second was to simulate the MiG-25 Foxbat, a high, fast flyer which would be going after high-value targets such as aerial refueling or airborne early warning and control aircraft like the E-3 Sentry.

The early MiG-23M series was also used to test the American Northrop F-5s captured by the North Vietnamese and sent to the former USSR for evaluation. The Soviets acknowledged the F-5 was a very agile aircraft, and at some speeds and altitudes better than the MiG-23M, one of the main reasons the MiG-23MLD and MiG-29 developments were started. These tests allowed the Russians to make modifications to several of their fourth-generation aircraft. The MiG-23, however, was not designed to combat F-5s, a weakness reflected by early MiG-23 variants.

The maximum climb rate for the MiG-23 variant 1971 and the MiG-23M, especially at low altitudes shows a big difference gap. The difference between the MiG-23M and MiG-23ML is much smaller, but also noticeable. The maximum calculated climb rate on the MiG-23 sub variant 1971 is 174 m/s (34,300 ft/min), which is not a very large indicator for a fighter of this class. In the MiG-23M, due to a much more powerful engine, the rate of climb increased to 222 m/s (43,700 ft/min), almost 50 m/s (10,000 ft/min) more. This figure is already consistent with the "status" of a powerful fighter aircraft. On the MiG-23ML, mainly due to weight reduction, the climb rate reached 242 m/s (47,600 ft/min), which corresponds to the most powerful aircraft of the 2-3rd generation, as well as some 4th generation fighters.

== Operational history ==
Western and Russian aviation historians usually differ in respect to combat record for their military vehicles and doctrines part due to the bias in favor of their respective national industries and academies. They also usually accept claims going along with their respective political views since usually many conflicting and contradictory reports are written and accepted by their respective historians. Before recent years, with widespread use of hand-portable cameras, little pictorial evidence could be published about specific losses and victories of the different combat systems, with a limited number of losses and victories confirmed by both parties.

=== Soviet and Warsaw Pact ===
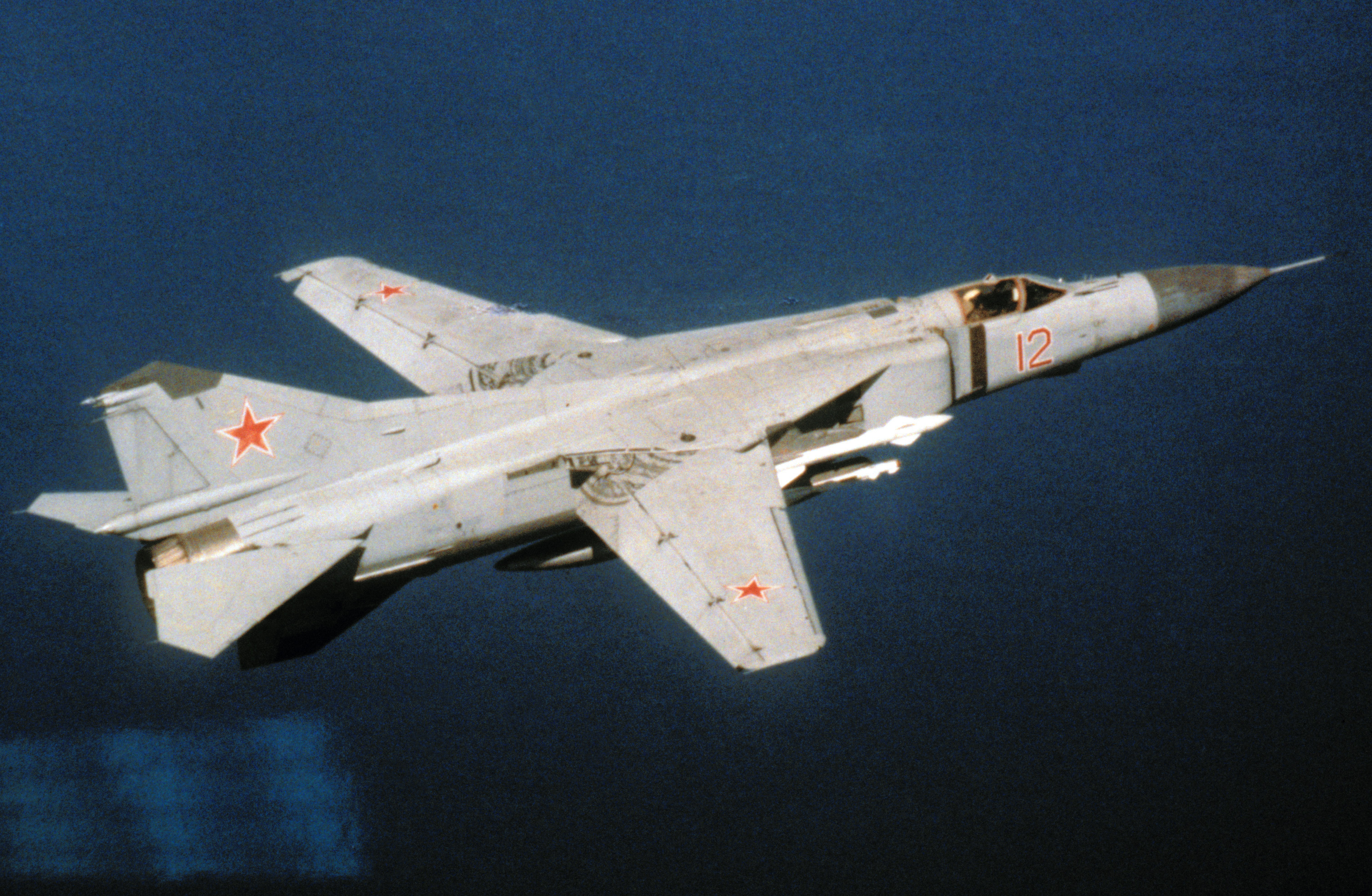
MiG-23M

The MiG-23 was first officially commissioned into the Soviet Air Forces (VVS) on 4 January 1974, but even before its mass introduction there had been many teething problems with the brand-new fighter. Stability issues and limited maneuverability resulted in numerous flight restrictions placed on the fighter as efforts to rectify these concerns began in the mid-1970s. Despite numerous updates, these restrictions would only be partially lifted with the introduction of the MiG-23MLD. Still, the large number of MiG-23s deployed in Central Europe represented a sufficiently potent threat in a possible war with the West.

Although many MiG-23 pilots were disappointed to discover their fighter would lose in a turning engagement with the MiG-21, the MiG-23 gave the VVS capabilities which the MiG-21 simply lacked, particularly as a high-energy fighter with BVR missiles. However, throughout the 1970s and early 1980s Soviet pilots continued to train and operate the MiG-23 in the same inflexible manner as the MiG-21: a high-speed point defense interceptor closely guided by GCI. It was not until the widespread introduction of the MiG-23MLD that Soviet pilots began to use the MiG-23 as a true air-superiority fighter.

By the 1980s, the MiG-23's accident rate in the VVS averaged 12.5 losses per 100,000 flying hours. This was often worse in the air forces of the Warsaw Pact allies: 24.3 major mishaps per 100,000 flying hours in the Hungarian Air Force; 20.4 losses per 100,000 flying hours in the East German Air Force; 18 losses per 100,000 flying hours in the Bulgarian Air Force; and 11.3 losses per 100,000 flying hours in the Polish Air Force.

By 1990, over 1,500 MiG-23s of different models were in service with the VVS and the V-PVO. With the dissolution of the Soviet Union, the new Russian Air Force began to cut back its fighter force, and it was decided that the single-engine MiG-23s and MiG-27s were to be retired to operational storage. The last model to serve was the MiG-23P air-defense variant: it was retired on 1 May 1998. The last kill claim for the MiG-23 in the service of any Warsaw Pact Nation would come in April 1992, when a MiG-23MLD of the Russian Airforce (Still the V-PVO then) allegedly destroyed a Georgian Airforce Su-25 using an R-24 missile.

When East and West Germany unified, no MiG-23s were transferred to the German Air Force, but twelve former East German MiG-23s were supplied to the United States. When Czechoslovakia split into the Czech Republic and Slovakia, the Czechs received all the MiG-23s, which were retired in 1998. Hungary retired its MiG-23s in 1996, Poland in 1999, Romania in 2000, and Bulgaria in 2004.

The MiG-23 was the Soviet Air Force's "Top Gun"-equivalent aggressor aircraft from the late 1970s to the late 1980s. It proved a difficult opponent for early MiG-29 variants flown by inexperienced pilots. Exercises showed when well-flown, a MiG-23MLD could achieve favorable kill ratios against the MiG-29 in mock combat by using hit-and-run tactics and not engaging the MiG-29s in dogfights. Usually the aggressor MiG-23MLDs had a shark mouth painted on the nose just aft of the radome, and many were piloted by Soviet–Afghan War veterans. In the late 1980s, these aggressor MiG-23s were replaced by MiG-29s, also featuring shark mouths.

Soviet–Afghan War

Soviet MiG-23s were used over Afghanistan, often being used to escort missions close to the borders of Pakistan and Iran, as the MiG-21 lacked the necessary range to do so. Some of them were claimed to have been shot down.

The earliest use of the MiG-23 in Afghanistan occurred in April 1982, when aircraft of the 152nd IAP escorted a large air raid against Rabat-e-Jali in Nimruz province. This developed into a disaster when the MiG-23s failed to provide adequate air cover and the strike force accidentally crossed into Iran, losing several helicopters to Iranian F-4 Phantoms.

Soviet and Afghan MiG-23s and Pakistani F-16s clashed a few times during the Soviet–Afghan War from 1987. Two MiG-23 were claimed shot down by Pakistani F-16s when crossing the border (they both were not confirmed) while one F-16 was shot down on 29 April 1987. Western sources consider it a friendly fire incident but the Soviet-backed Afghan government of the time and Pakistan claimed that Soviet aircraft downed the Pakistani F-16 – a claim that The New York Times and the Washington Post also reported. According to a Russian version of the event, the F-16 was shot down when Pakistani F-16s encountered Soviet MiG-23MLDs. Soviet MiG-23MLD pilots, while on a bombing raid along the Pakistani-Afghan border, reported being attacked by F-16s and then seeing one F-16 explode. It could have been downed by gunfire from a MiG whose pilot did not report the kill, because Soviet pilots were not allowed to attack Pakistani aircraft without permission.

In 1988, Soviet MiG-23MLDs using R-23s (NATO: AA-7 "Apex") downed two Iranian AH-1J Cobras that had intruded into Afghan airspace. In a similar incident a decade earlier, on 21 June 1978, a PVO MiG-23M flown by Pilot Captain V. Shkinder shot down two Iranian Boeing CH-47 Chinook helicopters that had trespassed into Soviet airspace, one helicopter being dispatched by two R-60 missiles and the other by cannon fire.

Air-to-air encounters, however, were not particularly frequent, with close air support accounting for most missions flown in Afghanistan while combat air patrol and air-to-air escort missions comprised 15% of the total. Sorties with dumb bombs and cluster munitions were flown against a wide range of targets, while more sophisticated weaponry was not often employed because of the difficult terrain and threat of MANPADs and AA. Attacks were made in pairs, with both MiGs diving at a 45-degree angle before releasing their bombs. After heavy losses in 1984–5, tactics were re-evaluated and a minimum altitude of 3,500 m (11,480 ft) was introduced. This was later increased to 4,500 m (14,760 ft). The accuracy of attacks was lowered and it became impossible to use unguided rockets at all. However, this was effective at reducing losses; there were none during 1986.

The two-seater MiG-23UB also saw service in Afghanistan, used for strike, reconnaissance and target designation. It was also used to familiarise MiG-27 pilots with flying in the hot and high conditions of Afghanistan when they were deployed there in 1988. Additionally, MiG-23UBs sometimes acted as a makeshift 'AWACS' aircraft, with an officer in the back seat observing and issuing commands to a strike group below him. The concept was dubbed "I am my own AWACS" by the Soviet pilots involved.

Naval aviation

MiG-23s of the Soviet Air Force were transferred to the Soviet Navy on two occasions. In 1984 a full regiment of MiG-23s was deployed to Vietnam to escort naval patrols by Tupolev Tu-95 aircraft. This later became the 169th Guards Composite Air Regiment. They flew over 400 sorties from Cam Ranh airbase, staying there until 1989, when the aircraft were withdrawn and returned to the air force.

The second instance of MiG-23s serving with the Soviet Navy occurred from 1990 to 1994, when nine MiG-23UB trainers were attached to the 88th Separate Fighter Bomber Regiment of the Northern Fleet's aviation component to train pilots for their MiG-27s.

=== Syria ===
==== Combat against Israel (since 1973) ====
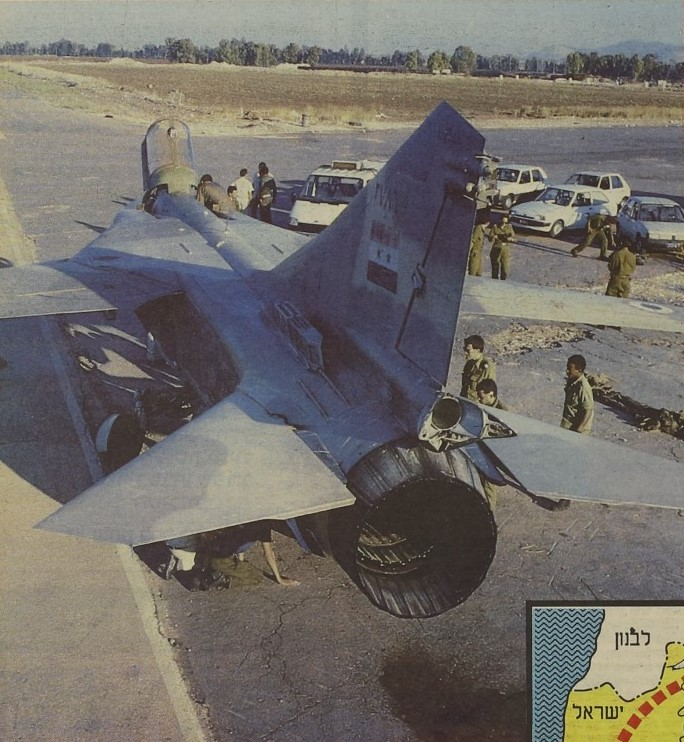
Bassem Adel's MiG-23 in Megiddo Airfield, 1989

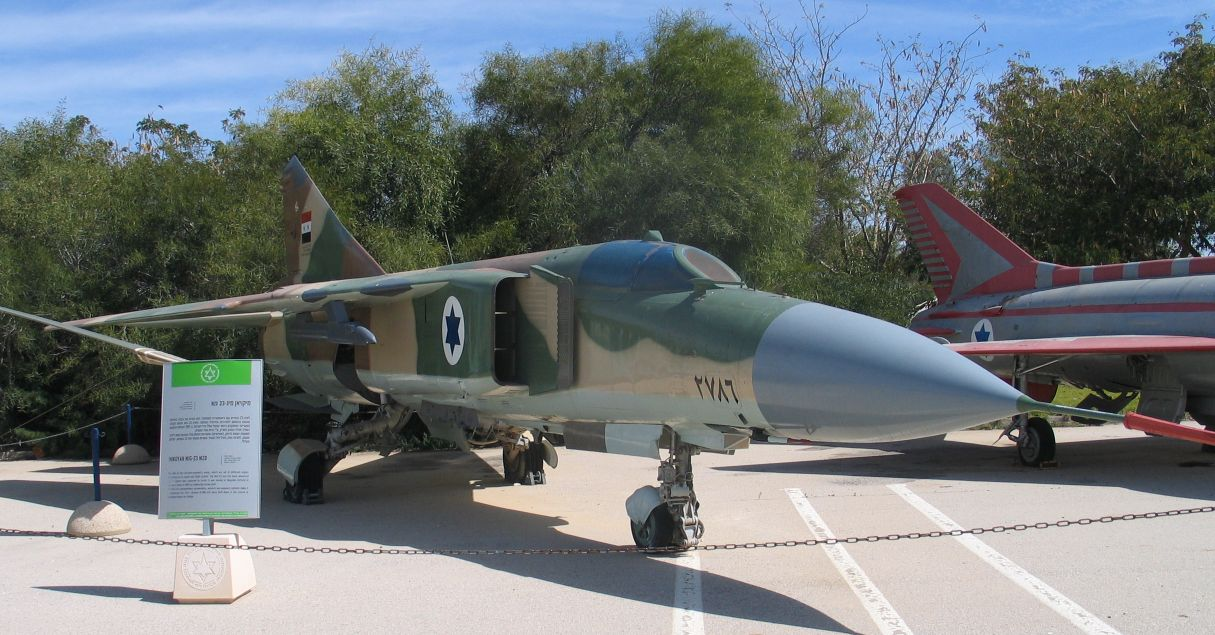
MiG-23 on display in Israel after defection from Syria

The first MiG-23s were supplied to Syria in April 1974. The process of making the MiG-23 operational was complex and difficult, because of the poor manufacturing quality and unreliability of the aircraft, and the lack of technical documentation. By the end of the year, up to 13 Syrian MiG-23s had already been written off. The first MiG-23s to see combat were export variants with many limitations. Compared to the MiG-21, the aircraft was mechanically complex and expensive and also less agile. The first interceptor variant to be exported, the MiG-23MS, was equipped with the same weapons system as the older MiG-21S, and its radar was particularly vulnerable to electronic countermeasures (ECM), at which the Israelis were especially proficient.

On 13 April 1974, after almost 100 days of artillery exchanges and skirmishes along the Golan Heights, Syrian helicopters delivered commandos to attack the Israeli observation post at Jebel Sheikh. This provoked heavy clashes in the air and on the ground for almost a week. On 19 April 1974, Captain al-Masry, flying a MiG-23MS on a weapons test mission, spotted a group of IAF F-4Es and shot two of them down after firing three missiles. He was about to attack another F-4 with cannon fire, but was shot down by friendly fire from a SAM battery. Due to this success, an additional 24 MiG-23MS interceptors, as well as a similar number of MiG-23BN strike variants, were delivered to Syria during the following year. In 1977, Syria bought between 28 and 30 MiG-23MFs, and the deliveries started in 1978.

The MiG-23MF, MiG-23MS and MiG-23BN were used in combat by Syria over Lebanon between 1981 and 1985. On 26 April 1981, Syria claimed that two Israeli A-4 Skyhawks attacking a camp in Sidon were shot down by two MiG-23MSs. However, Israel does not report any loss of aircraft from this incident and no loss of aircraft was reported on that date. Russian historian Vladimir Ilyin writes that the Syrians lost six MiG-23MFs, four MiG-23MSs and 14 MiG-23BNs in June 1982. One more MiG-23 fighter was lost in July. The Israelis also claimed that they shot down two MiG-23s in 1985, which the Syrians deny. Overall, 11–13 Syrian MiG-23 fighter variants were lost in air combat from 1982 to 1985. Israel confirms only the loss of BQM-34 Firebee which was downed by Syrian MiG-23MF on 6 June 1982.

In the early 2000s, Israeli UAVs regularly flew reconnaissance missions over Lebanon, but sometimes inside Syrian airspace too. MiG-23s were often scrambled in response, and they have reportedly shot down several UAVs, starting in July 2001. Indeed, between 2001 and 2006, up to 10 Israeli UAVs were shot down over Syria each year.

==== Syrian Civil War ====
A former Syrian Air Force MiG-23MS became iconic of the Siege of Abu al-Duhur Airbase: on 7 March 2012, Syrian rebels used a 9K115-2 Metis-M anti-tank guided missile to hit the derelict MiG. Later, in March 2013 they entered in the base, showing the worn out and damaged MiG. Finally, in May 2013, the Syrian Air Force bombed it to completely destroy the wreck.

Syrian MiG-23BNs bombed the city of Aleppo on 24 July 2012, becoming the first use of fixed-wing aircraft for bombing in the Syrian civil war.

On 13 August 2012, a Syrian MiG-23BN was reportedly shot down by the rebels of the Free Syrian Army near Deir ez-Zor, although the government claimed that it went down due to technical difficulties.

Since then, Syrian Air Force MiG-23s together with different Syrian Air Force fighter jets have regularly been spotted performing attack runs on Syrian insurgents, who have claimed different MiGs being shot down or destroyed on the ground on different occasions.

On 23 March 2014, one Syrian MiG-23 was shot down after being hit by an AIM-9 Sidewinder fired by a Turkish F-16 in the vicinity of the Syrian town of Kessab. The pilot ejected safely and was recovered by friendly forces. Turkish sources said the fighter violated Turkish airspace and it was downed after several radio warnings while approaching the border. Another Syrian MiG-23 returned to Syria after trespassing into Turkish airspace.

On 15 June 2017, one Jordanian Selex ES Falco UAV was shot down by a Syrian MiG-23MLD in the vicinity of the Syrian town of Derra. On 16 June, another Selex ES Falco was shot down by MiG-23ML both using R-24R missiles.

On 9 September 2020, a Syrian MiG-23 crashed in Deir ez-Zor Governorate without information on the fate of its pilot.

During the 2024 Syrian opposition offensive, the insurgents managed to capture a number of derelict MiG-23 and Aero L-39 Albatros jets after the capture of Aleppo.

=== Egypt ===
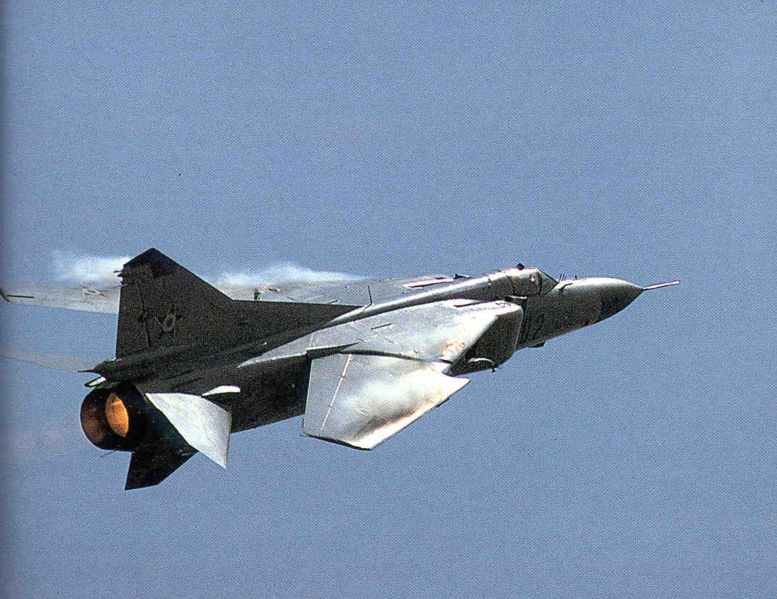
A Hungarian MiG-23MF in flight

Egypt became one of the first export customers when it bought in 1974 eight MiG-23MS interceptors, eight MiG-23BN strikers and four MIG-23UB trainers, concentrating them into a single squadron based at Mersa Matruh. By 1975 all Egyptian MiG-23s had been withdrawn from active duty and placed in storage due to the Egyptian foreign policy shifting towards the West and thus losing USSR support.

Starting in 1978 China purchased from Egypt two MiG-23MS interceptors, two MiG-23BNs, two MiG-23UBs, ten MiG-21MFs, and ten KSR-2 (AS-5 Kelt) air-to-surface missiles in exchange for Shenyang J-6 jets, spare parts and technical support for the Egyptian fleet of Soviet-supplied MiG-17 and MiG-21s. The Chinese used the aircraft as the basis for their J-9 project, which never ventured beyond the research phase.

Some time later the remaining six MiG-23MS examples and six MiG-23BNs, as well as 16 MiG-21MFs, two Sukhoi Su-20 Fitters, two MiG-21Us, two Mil Mi-8 Hips and ten KSR-2s were purchased for the Foreign Technology Division, a special department of the USAF, responsible for evaluating adversary technologies. These were exchanged for weapons and spares support, including AIM-9J/P Sidewinder missiles, which were installed on remaining Egyptian MiG-21s.

=== Iraq ===
Iraq bought its first MiG-23s in 1973, in order to replace its Hawker Hunters and MiG-17Fs. Deliveries lasted from 1974 to 1978, and consisted of 18 MiG-23MS interceptors, between 36 and 40 MiG-23BN strike aircraft, and several MiG-23UB trainers. The introduction of these new aircraft proved particularly difficult for the Iraqi Air Force. Training in the Soviet Union included little flight time, and since the Soviets didn't provide any technical documentation or flight manuals, the Iraqis had to run flight testing on their own. Moreover, the handling qualities and the avionics outfit of the MiG-23 were heavily criticised, and the airframes' manufacturing quality was poor. Unsurprisingly, by 1978 at least 12 MiG-23s had been written off in accidents. An additional batch of MiG-23MS was bought in the late 1970s to compensate for the losses.

==== Iran-Iraq War (1980–1988) ====
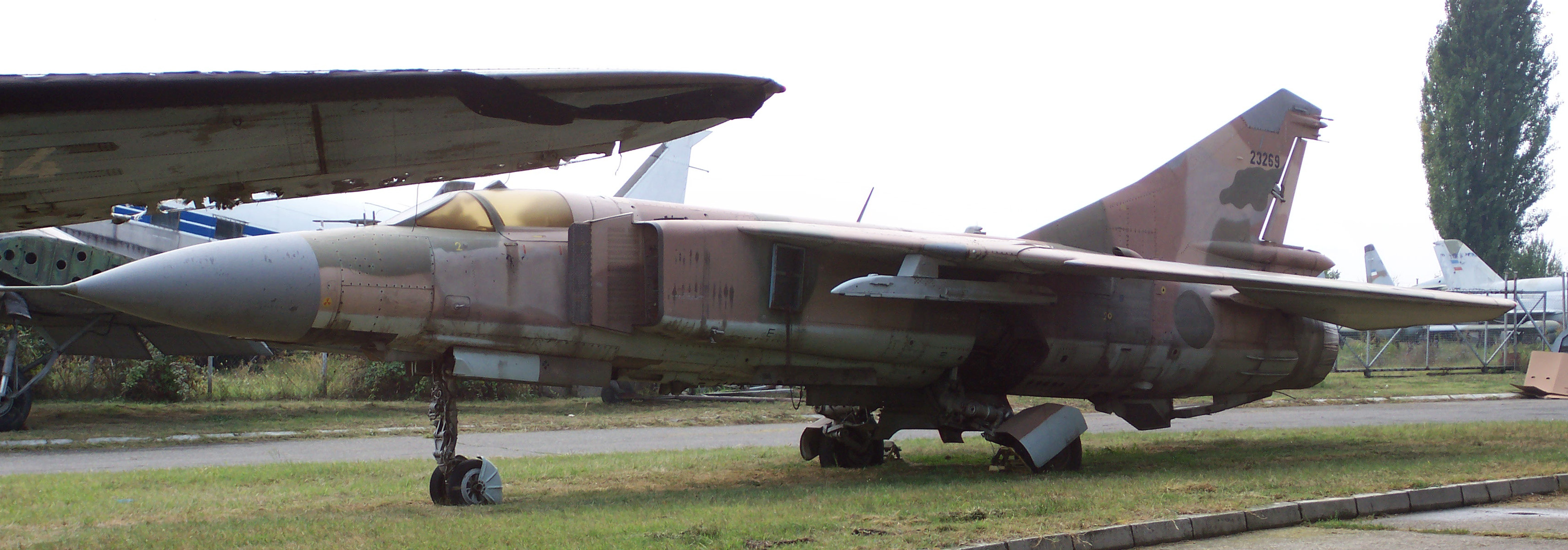
Ex-Iraqi MiG-23ML in Belgrade

The MiG-23 took part in the Iran–Iraq War and was used in both air-to-air and air-to-ground roles. On the first day of the war (22 September), both the MiG-23MS and the MiG-23BNs participated in attacks against Iranian airbases. The next day, an Iraqi MiG-23MS shot down an Iranian Northrop F-5E. However, this day also marked the first MiG-23 losses of the war: three MiG-23BNs were shot down by Iranian interceptors and air defences. Several more MiG-23s were shot down in the following months, mostly MiG-23BNs. The high losses were compounded by the embargo placed on Iraq by the Soviet Union in reaction to the war. By the end of 1980, Iraqi MiG-23MS pilots had claimed a total of three F-5Es shot down, all of them over the Iraqi airspace.

Despite the embargo, five MiG-23MFs that had been delivered prior to the outbreak of the war were rushed into service in the latter half of 1981. Attempting to replicate the success of the Mirage F1s that shot down two F-14 Tomcats on 15 November 1981, the pilots of Iraqi MiG-23 interceptor units started trying to sneak upon the Iranian Tomcats in a similar way a few days later. However, following these two losses, the Iranian pilots had adapted their tactics. While the F-14s flew combat air patrols at high altitude, pairs of F-5Es or F-4 Phantoms were positioned at low altitude in order to prevent Iraqi fighters from approaching the Tomcats unobserved. These new tactics worked out when two MiG-23MFs were shot down by the F-14s after having been visually detected by the F-5s, on 25 November. Several more Iraqi fighters were lost in similar circumstances during this period. MiG-23BN units continued suffering losses too, especially to F-14s and MIM-23B I-HAWK surface-to-air missiles. The Iraqi MiG-23BNs delivered in the 1970s only had a subpar radar warning receiver and no electronic countermeasures (ECM) equipment, despite the Iraqi Air Force having paid for it. In 1982, the Soviets lifted their embargo, and aircraft deliveries restarted: 18 additional MiG-23MFs were delivered, together with 18 MiG-23BNs equipped with the ECM system requested since the 1970s.

In 1983–1984, the MiG-23MFs were used to intercept Iranian RF-4E reconnaissance aircraft flying over Iraq. Even though these aircraft were unarmed, they proved very hard to catch, and each of their flights was protected by a pair of F-14s; on 1 January 1984, Tomcats shot down a MiG-23MF while escorting an RF-4E. Later that month, an RF-4E was shot down by a MiG-23MF. Another RF-4E was shot down yet again by an MiG-23MF in June. That year also marked the arrival of the first MiG-23MLs; in total, at least 64 were ordered by Iraq. On 11 August, one of the new MiG-23MLs shot down the F-14 flown by IRIAF Colonel Hashem All-e-Agha with an R-60MK missile over the Persian Gulf. Iraqi MiG-23MLs downed another Tomcat on 2 September 1986, when Iranian Air Force Captain Ahmad Moradi Talebi was shot down while attempting to defect with his F-14A.

On 20 February 1986, Colonel Abdolbaghi Darvish was shot down by an Iraqi MiG-23ML while flying his Iranian Fokker F27 Friendship (F27-600). All 51 crew and passengers were killed. The aircraft was carrying a delegation of military and government officials on a mission.

From 1984 onwards, due to the exhaustion of both its personnel and its aircraft, the Iranian air force stopped operating its fighters over the frontlines. Hence, the Iraqis started using their aircraft to attack targets further into Iran. MiG-23BNs participated in these attacks, as part of bigger strike packages including other bombers, a fighter escort (often including MiG-23MF/MLs), and SEAD aircraft. They also flew close air support missions. Thanks to the decreased presence of IRIAF interceptors and to the much-improved protection offered by escort, SEAD and electronic countermeasures aircraft, losses were much lower than during the first months of the war.

According to official post-war Iraqi Air Force documents, Iraq lost a total of 38 MiG-23BNs, three MiG-23MS, one MiG-23MF and one MiG-23ML. However, the stated losses for interceptor variants are much lower than the actual number of aircraft lost. For example, the number of pilots known to have been killed while flying MiG-23MS/MFs is twice as high as the official figure for all MiG-23 interceptor variants. In return, Iraqi MiG-23 pilots have claimed around 20 aerial victories, of which seven have been confirmed after cross-examination with data from Iranian sources.

==== Kuwait Invasion and Gulf War (1990–1991) ====
On 2 August 1990, the Iraqi Air Force supported the invasion of Kuwait with MiG-23BN and Su-22 aircraft as the main strike assets. A number of Iraqi aircraft and helicopters were shot down by Kuwaiti air defense MIM-23 Hawk SAM sites, among them a MiG-23BN.

Iraqi MiG-23s damaged two EF-111A Ravens with R-60 missiles during the Gulf War.

Iraqi documents captured after the invasion of Iraq revealed that they possessed 127 MiG-23s, including 38 MiG-23BNs and 21 MiG-23 trainers, at the start of Operation Desert Storm. During the Gulf War, the United States Air Force reported downing eight Iraqi MiG-23s with F-15s. Iraqi documents confirm the total destruction of 43 MiG-23s from all causes, with another 10 damaged and 12 others fleeing to Iran. This left Iraq with just 63 MiG-23s after the war, including 18 MiG-23BNs and 12 trainers.

The United States stated that the losses of the F-16Cs were caused by 2K12 Kub and S-125 Neva/Pechora surface-to-air missiles rather than enemy aircraft. Also, no Tornado loss is attributed to enemy aircraft as per the Royal Air Force and the Italian Air Force.

==== No Fly Zone and invasion of Iraq (1991–2003) ====
On 17 January 1993, a USAF F-16C destroyed an Iraqi MiG-23 with an AMRAAM missile. On 9 September 1999, a lone MiG-23 crossed the no-fly zone heading towards a flight of F-14s. One F-14 fired an AIM-54 Phoenix at the MiG but missed and the MiG headed back north. However, the aircraft then crashed while its pilot was attempting to land.

In 2003, during Operation Iraqi Freedom, the entire Iraqi Air Force remained grounded with several airframes found by US and allied forces around the Iraqi air bases in derelict condition after the invasion. The invasion marked the end of Iraqi service for the MiG-23.

=== Libya ===
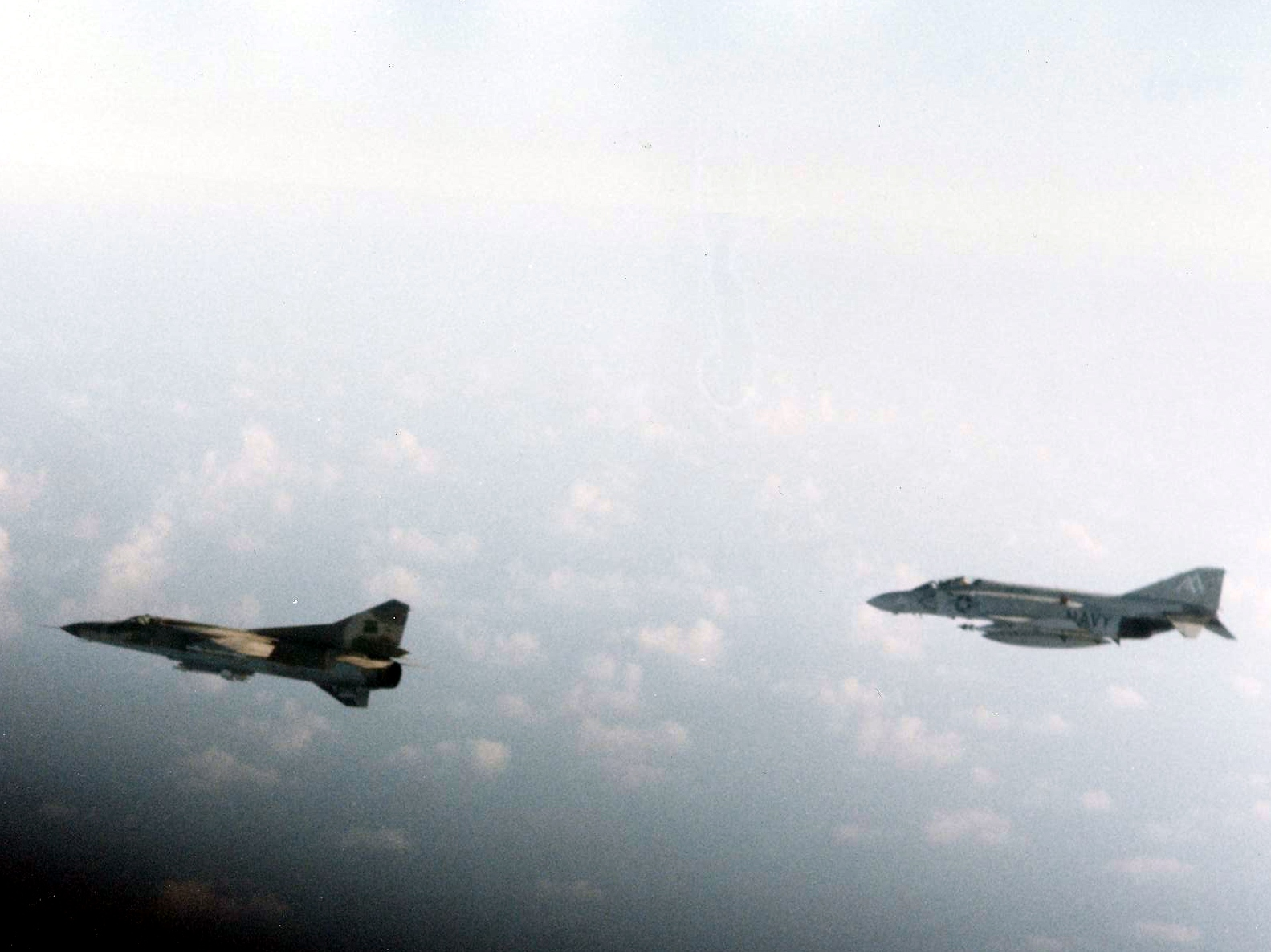
Libyan MiG-23 over Gulf of Sidra in August 1981, being followed by an F-4 just before the first Gulf of Sidra incident

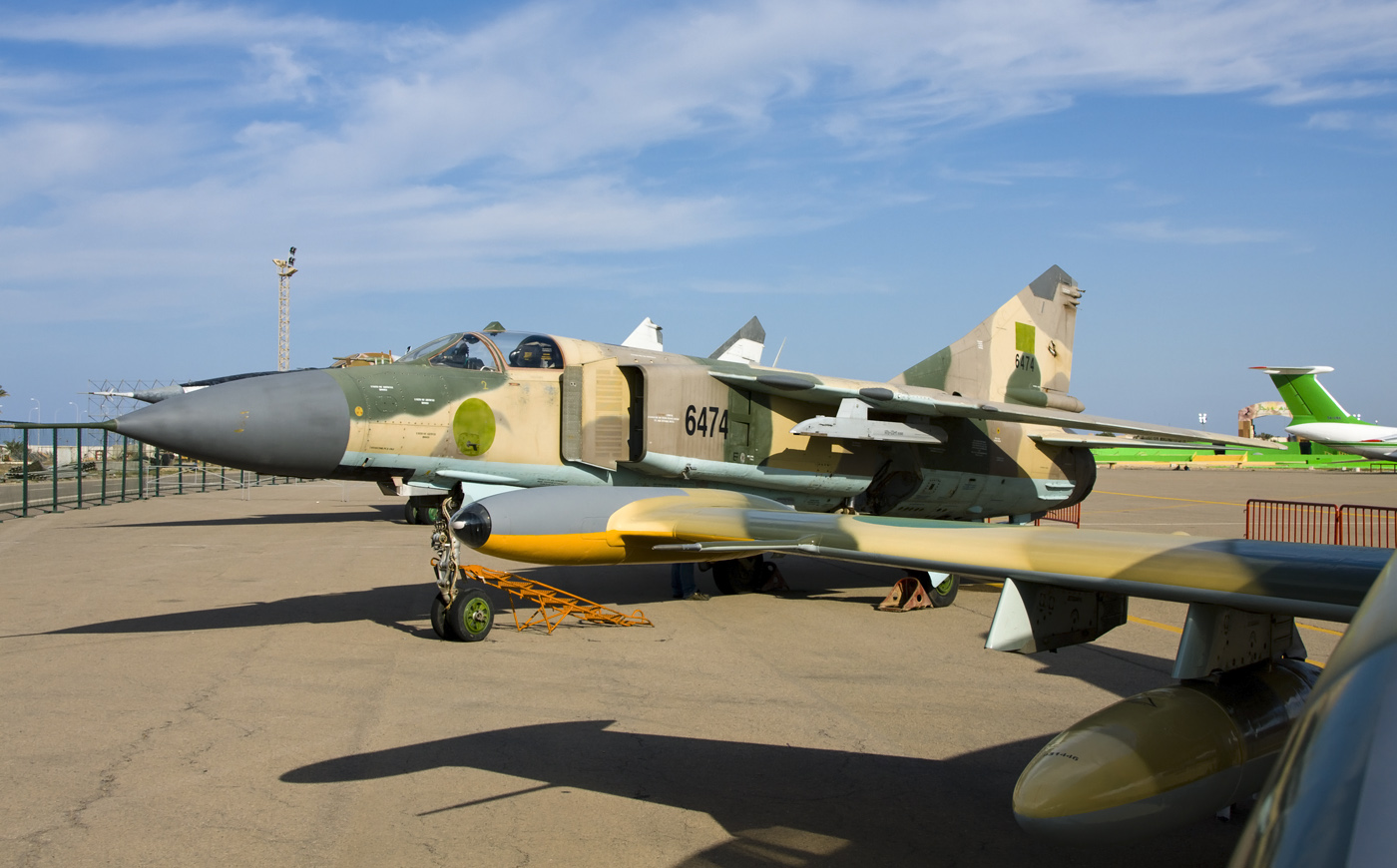
Libyan MiG-23

Libya received a total of 54 MiG-23MS and 15 MiG-23UBs between 1975 and 1978, as well as 35 to 38 MiG-23BNs. These aircraft entered service with the 1040th, 1050th, 1060th and 1070th Squadrons. The 1040th and 1050th Squadrons were staffed by Syrian Air Force personnel.

One Libyan MiG-23MS was shot down by an Egyptian MiG-21 fighter during and immediately after the Libyan–Egyptian War in 1977 while supporting a strike on the airfield at Mersa Matruh, forcing the remaining MiG to abort the mission. In one skirmish in 1979, two LARAF MiG-23MS engaged two EAF MiG-21MF which had been upgraded to carry Western air-to-air missiles such as the AIM-9P3 Sidewinder. The Libyan pilots made the mistake of trying to outmaneuver the more nimble Egyptian MiG-21s, and one MiG-23MS was shot down by Maj. Sal Mohammad with an AIM-9P3 Sidewinder missile, while the other used its superior speed to escape.

On 18 July 1980, the wreckage of an LARAF MiG-23MS was found on the northern side of the Sila massif, in the middle of the Italian region of Calabria. The deceased pilot, Captain Ezzedin Fadhel Khalil, was found still strapped to his ejection seat.

In August 1981, Libyan MiG-23MS fighters were involved in the standoff with the US Navy which led to the first Gulf of Sidra incident, although they were not involved in any actual combats on this occasion.

In the mid-1980s, newer versions of the MiG-23 entered service with the Libyan Air Force. Around 20 MiG-23MFs were received in 1984 to re-equip the 1060th Squadron. 48 MiG-23MLDs were also ordered in the same period. Two Squadrons, the 1023rd and 1024th, were created to operate these aircraft.

Libyan MiG-23s were employed during the Chadian–Libyan conflict performing different roles, starting in 1981. During the first years of their involvement, both the MiG-23MS and MiG-23BN variants were used, almost exclusively for ground attack. Later in the war, some combat air patrols were flown too, with the more advanced MiG-23MF and MiG-23MLD variants being used as well. On 5 January 1987, a Libyan MiG-23 was shot down and few months later, on 5 September 1987, Chadian forces performed a land raid against Maaten al-Sarra Air Base in Libya, destroying several Libyan aircraft on the ground, among them, three MiG-23s. On 8 October 1987, a MiG-23BN was shot down by ground fire, with its pilot being recovered by a helicopter.

MiG-23 interceptors were also used by Libya during the action in the Gulf of Sidra in 1986. Although they were flown aggressively, with their pilots sometimes trying to get into a firing position behind the American fighters (with little success), neither the MiG-23s nor their opponents opened fire against each other.

Two Libyan MiG-23MF fighters were shot down by U.S. Navy F-14As in the Second Gulf of Sidra incident in 1989.

Libyan Civil War

In the 2011 Libyan civil war, Libyan Air Force MiG-23s were used to bomb rebel positions. On 15 March 2011, a rebel website reported that opposition forces started using a captured MiG-23 and a helicopter to sink 2 loyalist ships and bomb some tank positions.

On 19 March 2011, a MiG-23BN of the Free Libyan Air Force was shot down over Benghazi by its own air defenses, which mistook it for a loyalist aircraft. The pilot was killed after he ejected too late.

On 26 March 2011, five MiG-23s together with two Mi-35 helicopters were destroyed by the French Air Force while parked at Misrata airport, early reports misidentified the fixed wing aircraft as G-2 Galebs.

On 9 April, a rebel MiG-23 was intercepted over Benghazi by NATO aircraft and escorted back to its base for violating the UN no-fly zone.

A limited number of MiG-23's which survived the 2011 Libyan civil war and NATO bombings were involved in air strikes between the opposing Libyan House of Representatives and the rival General National Congress during the Second Libyan Civil War with both parties controlling a limited number of aircraft.

On 23 March 2015, a New General National Congress operated MiG-23UB was shot down while bombing Al Watiya airbase, controlled by the Libyan House of Representative probably with an Igla-S MANPADS. Both pilots were killed. At the beginning of 2016, Libyan House of Representatives forces controlled three airworthy MiG-23s among other aircraft, two MiG-23MLA and one MiG-23UB. They were all lost on three occasions with a first MiG-23MLA, serial 6472, lost near Benina airbase on 4 January, after an airstrike, the second MiG-23MLA, serial 6132, lost on 8 February while conducting air strikes against Islamic State near Derna and the MiG-23UB, serial 7834, lost on 12 February 2016 while operating west of Benghazi, claimed shot down by the Islamic State with the official government attributing the loss to anti aircraft artillery. In all the occasions the aircrews ejected while the cause of the first two crashes remained debated between hostile fire and mechanical causes.

On 28 February 2016, a MiG-23MLA serial 6453 was restored to flying status after several years, becoming the only MiG-23 in service with the Libyan Air Force as of March 2016, performing missions against enemy positions and vehicles since March 2016.

In the following weeks, both the Libyan National Army Air Force and the opposing Libyan Dawn Air Force, restored a number of MiG-23BN, MiG-23ML and MiG-23UB to flying status and they were recorded while flying over Libyan skies and striking enemy positions.

On 6 December 2019, a Libyan National Army (LNA) MiG-23MLD was shot down by forces loyal to the Government of National Accord (GNA). In the ongoing Libyan Civil War both parties are pushing back to service stored airframes after repairs with foreign assistance. The jet, serial 26144, was restored using the wings of two different airframes and became flyable again in August 2019, after around 20 years of storage. The jet was hit over the Yarmouk frontline in southern Tripoli and crashed in Al Zawiya city and the pilot, Amer Jagem was detained after ejecting. A video emerged showing the aircraft diving for attack with soldiers on the ground firing a Strela-2M MANPADS in response. The LNA reported they lost a MiG-23 due to technical fault, denying it crashed due to enemy fire.

=== Sudan ===
Sudan received extensive military aid, including 12 MiG-23MS and one MiG-23UB from its former enemy Libya starting in 1987. They quickly entered service fighting against the South Sudan People's Defence Forces (SPLA) in 1988 during the Second Sudanese Civil War. A number of these jets were lost either to ground fire or crashed. By 1990 Libya withdrew its military advisors from Sudan and the remaining four MiG-23 jets were placed in storage. Starting from 2010, Sudan started to refurbish its MiG-23 jets locally with the help of Russia, Byelorussian and Ethiopian technicians with pictures of freshly painted and refurbished jets circling online. One crash-landed and caught fire during flight testing in 2016.

=== Cuba ===
Cuba in Angola

Cuban MiG-23MLs and South African Mirage F1 pilots had several encounters during the Cuban intervention in Angola, one of which resulted in severe damage to a Mirage F1.

On 27 September 1987, during Operation Moduler, two MiG-23 pilots surprised a pair of Mirages and fired missiles: Alberto Ley Rivas engaged a Mirage flown by Captain Arthur Douglas Piercy with a pair of R-23Rs (some sources say a R-60), while the other Cuban pilot fired a single R-60 at a Mirage flown by Captain Carlo Gagiano. Although the missiles homed on the Mirages, only one R-23R exploded close enough to cause damage to the landing hydraulics of Captain Piercy's Mirage (and, according to some accounts, the aircraft's drag chute). The damage likely contributed to the Mirage veering off the runway on landing, after which the nose gear collapsed. The nose hit the ground so hard that Piercy's ejection seat fired. As a result of this ground level ejection, Piercy was paralyzed. The aircraft was written off, but a large portion of the airframe and components were used to repair another accident-damaged Mirage F1 and return it to service. In total, the Cubans claimed 6 air victories with the MiG-23 (1 destroyed, 1 damaged and 4 were unconfirmed).

Angolan MiG-23s outclassed SAAF Mirage F1CZ and F1AZ fighters in terms of power/acceleration, radar/avionics capabilities, and air-to-air weapons. The MiG-23's R-23 and R-60 missiles gave FAPA/DAA pilots the ability to engage SAAF aircraft from most aspects. The SAAF, hobbled by an international arms embargo, was forced to carry an obsolescent version of the French Matra R.550 Magic missile or early-generation V-3 Kukri missiles, which had limited range and performance relative to the R-60 and R-23. Despite these limitations, SAAF pilots were able to vector within the firing envelope and fire air-to-air missiles at MiG-23s (gun camera shots evidence this). The missiles either missed or exploded ineffectually behind in the tail plume rather than homing on the hot airframe.

UNITA rebels, opposing Cuban/MPLA forces, shot down a number of MiG-23s with American-supplied FIM-92 Stinger MANPADS missiles. South African ground forces shot down a MiG-23, which was prosecuting a raid on the Calueque Dam, by using the Ystervark (porcupine) 20 mm AA gun.

=== Ethiopia ===
MiG-23s supplied by the Soviet Union to Mengistu Haile Mariam's Derg were heavily used by the Ethiopian Air Force against the array of rebel guerillas fighting the government during the Ethiopian Civil War. According to a 1990 Human Rights Watch report, the attacks, often using napalm or phosphorus and cluster munitions, were not only aimed at the rebels, but against civilian populations (in both Eritrea and Ethiopia) and humanitarian convoys in a deliberate fashion.

Ethiopian MiG-23s were used in ground attack and strike missions during the border war with Eritrea from May 1998 to June 2000, even striking targets at the airport in the Eritrean capital city, Asmara on several occasions. Three Ethiopian MiG-23BNs were shot down by Eritrean MiG-29s.

On 29 November 2020, an Ethiopian Air Force MiG-23 reportedly crashed during the Tigray conflict near Abiy Addi, 50 kilometers west of Mekelle. Unreliable images of the pilot were circulating after being captured by the Tigray People's Liberation Front who claimed they shot it down, showing the pilot with his Zsh-7 flying helmet (originally intended for Su-27 and MiG-29), a flight suit, a MiG-23 English manual and the crash site with charred metal parts.

=== India ===
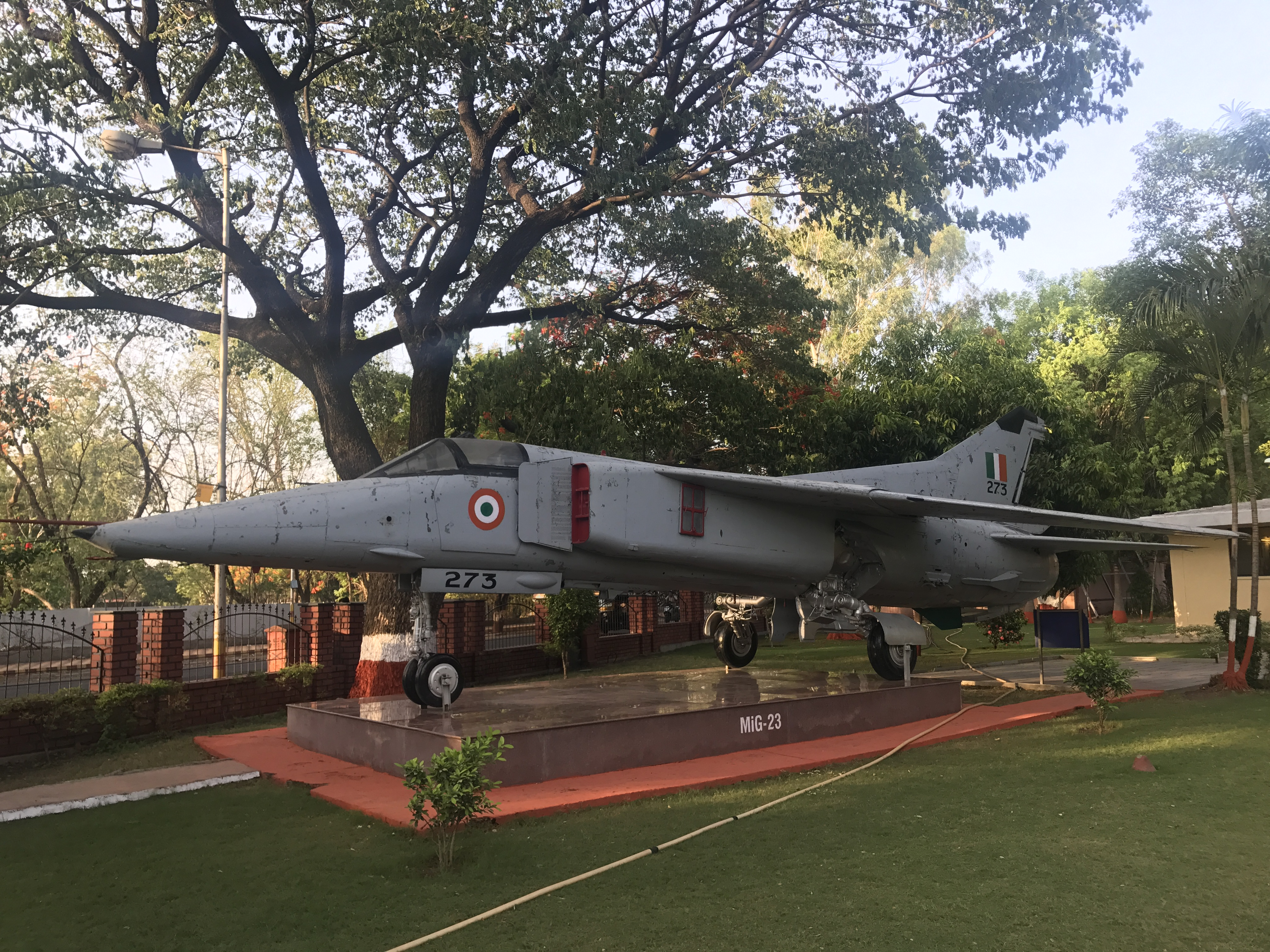
MiG-23BN used in Operation Safed Sagar

The Indian Air Force first evaluated the MiG-23 in 1979, though the IAF was initially disappointed with the aircraft's air-defence models but it was pleased with its strike variants. However, when the IAF decided to order the western SEPECAT Jaguar as its long-range interdictor platform, the Soviet government feared losing out on a large customer, and hurriedly pitched the MiG-23 as a short range strike aircraft for the IAF's TASA (Tactical Air Support Aircraft) programme that sought sought to replace the ageing Su-7's and HAL HF-24's. India decided to placate Soviet interests, when MiG offered an evaluation of the aircraft without a firm order in 1979.

India first acquired MiG-23s in 1980, with the Indian Air Force inducting 46 MiG-23MFs and 95 MiG-23BNs. MiG-23MFs were acquired from the Soviet Union as part of a larger modernization drive in the 1980s to keep up with increasing regional threats. They were commissioned into service on 24 January 1981 with the role of being Tactical Air Strike Aircraft first and Local Air Defence aircraft as second. Forty MF variants were acquired in September 1981 and equipped two squadrons to counteract the Pakistani acquisition of F-16s, prior to being succeeded and replaced in both roles by the arrival of more modern Mirage 2000s and MiG-29s by the end of the decade. IAF pilots were trained at Lugovoya airfield in the USSR.

The MiG-23s were reportedly purchased as a stopgap aircraft, primarily for their advanced technologies such as the Sapfir radar, Lazur-M datalinks and TPS-23 IRST along with their superior nightfighting capabilities, relieving IAF MiG-21s for Air Defence. They also were the first IAF aircraft to be equipped with BVR missiles in the form of the R-23R and R-23T. The MiG-23BNs were bought preceding the Indian deal to manufacture MiG-27Ms locally in the late 1980s.

IAF MiG-23s were first used to provide top cover to transport helicopters during the 1984 Siachen conflict, where they were deployed to high altitude airfields in Kashmir and Leh. No.221 squadron and No.223 squadrons were deployed as two detachments of both MiG-23BNs and MiG-23MFs. Subsequently they were also dispatched to Patankot, Awantipur and Halwara airbases. Later flights would also see MiG-23s rom the No. 224 squadron frequent the Thoise Advanced landing ground in Ladakh.

On 26 May 1999, the Indian Air Force started airstrikes during the Kargil War. Ground attack aircraft including MiG-21, MiG-23, MiG-27, and Mirage 2000 were used to bombard Pakistani positions in Kargil and Drass during Operation Safed Sagar. IAF MiG-23's flew over 155 missions and flew at the Battle of Tiger Hill utilising their heavy cannons, 57 mm rockets and 500 kg bombs to neutralise enemy targets. MiG-23's claimed the highest bombing rates of any IAF aircraft as they were being the only aircraft type capable of deploying their maximum weapon load at that altitude. 12 aircraft from the No.9 and No.221 squadrons were deployed during this conflict. The MiG-23BNs and MiG-27s made vital contributions towards softening high-value targets in the areas of Muntho Dhalo, Batalik, Drass, Kargil and Mashkoh.

The BNs served in No.10 Squadron, No.221 Squadron and No. 220 Squadron from January 1981 to March 2011 with the final sortie of the BNs taking place officially on 6 March 2011. Cumulatively the aircraft type had flown over 154000 hours in IAF service. 15 MiG-23UB trainers were retained in service to train IAF pilots to fly MiG-27s. An IAF MiG-23 crashed in Jodhpur during these training flights with both pilots ejecting safely. They were retired from active service in 2019 . Despite being retired, around 40 IAF MiG-23s have been stored at the IAF's maintenance command as reserve aircraft and have been sighted occasionally conducting Target towing duties.

== Variants ==
=== First-generation ===
Ye-231
("Flogger-A") was the designation given to the prototype MiG-23 built for testing purposes. Although the experimental model featured the same basic design as later MiG-23/-27 models, it lacked the sawtooth leading edge common on later variants. It also shares design elements with the Sukhoi Su-24, although the Su-24 would go on to experience greater modification.

MiG-23
("Flogger-A") was a pre-production model which lacked weapon hardpoints but was armed with guns and featured the sawtooth leading edge of later MiG-23s. It also marked the divergence point of the MiG-23/-27 and Su-24 designs.

MiG-23S
("Flogger-A") was the initial production variant. An interim variant, it was externally similar to the prototype but as the Sapfir-23 had been delayed it was equipped with the RP-22SM Sapfir radar and lacked an IRST. The first MiG-23Ss were powered by an R-27F-300 turbojet with a dry thrust of 67.62 kN (15,200 lb_{f}) and 78.5 kN (17,600 lb_{f}) on afterburner; later version used the uprated R-27F2M-300 with a dry thrust of 64.53 kN (14,510 lb_{f}) and 98 kN (22,000 lb_{f}) on afterburner.

The first MiG-23S took flight on 21 May 1969, and from July 1969 to mid-1973 a total of 11 MiG-23Ss were involved in protracted testing by the Ministry of Aircraft Industry and the VVS. It was during this testing phase where a number of faults with the MiG-23 were discovered - including dangerous behavior at high AoA, propensity to spin in certain circumstances, and development of cracks in the joints between the center fuselage and wings - and several accidents occurred with the loss of life. Around 60 production-standard MiG-23Ss were built between 1969 and the early 1970s. However these only saw brief front-line service with the 4th TsBPiPLS and 979th IAP before the numerous unreliability issues forced their retirement.

MiG-23
("Flogger-A") was another interim variant which replaced the MiG-23S starting in late 1970; while known simply as the MiG-23, it was also called the MiG-23 Edition 1971. It was the first to feature the Sapfir-23 radar (albeit the unreliable Sapfir-23L model which lacked look-down/shoot-down) allowing it to fire the R-23R SARH missile, along with a TP-23 IRST and ASP-23D gunsight/HUD. A redesigned fuselage moved the tail surfaces back 86 cm (34 in), added ribbed air brakes, and inserted another fuel tank with 470 L (100 imp gal; 120 US gal) capacity. The new wing design, known as Edition 2 wings, increased surface area by 20 percent to improved wing loading but resulted in a change in sweep settings; it also added a pronounced leading-edge dogtooth but removed the leading-edge slats, making them easier to manufacture but increasing the already dangerous control and stability issues. The MiG-23 Edition 1971 was powered by a R-27F2-300 turbojet rated at 67.62 kN (15,200 lb_{f}) dry and 98 kN (22,000 lb_{f}) with afterburners.

Around 80 MiG-23 Edition 1971s were manufactured in 1971. These briefly saw service with frontline VVS fighter regiments until eventually being assigned to a training role in 1978.

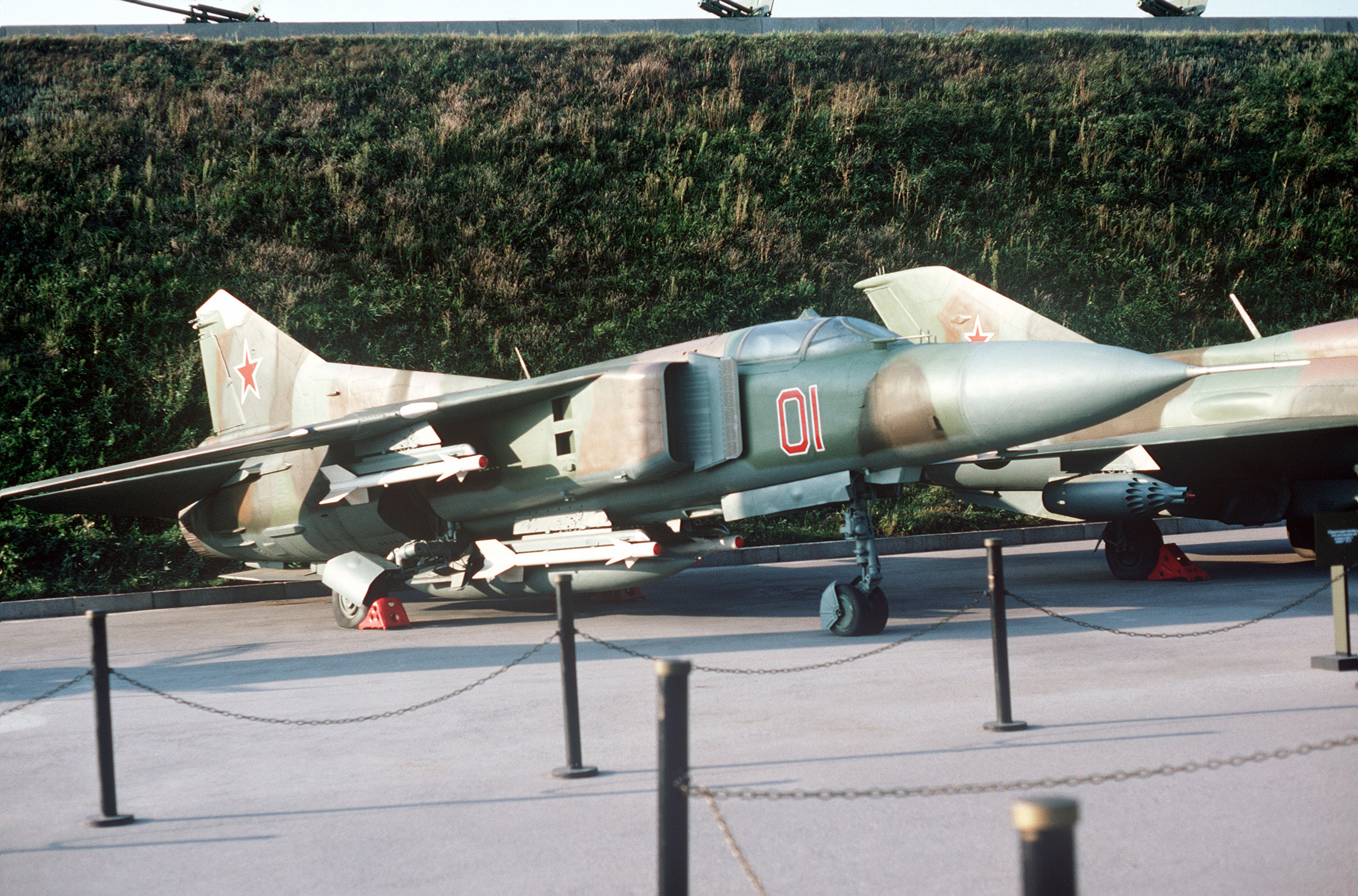
MiG-23M "Flogger-B" on display at the National Museum of the History of Ukraine in the Second World War, Kyiv

MiG-23M
("Flogger-B") The most produced variant of the first-generation MiG-23s, the MiG-23M first flew in June 1972 and became the VVS' chief air superiority fighter, giving it a true look-down/shoot-down capability. While the first fighters were equipped with the Sapfir-23L, it was quickly succeeded by the improved Sapfir-23D (and in 1975 the Sapfir-23D-III), allowing the MiG-23M to carry a pair of R-23 missiles and R-60 missiles. Other updates to the electronics included the SAU-23A three-axis automatic flight control system/autopilot and Polyot-11-23 navigation system. An updated wing design, the definitive Edition 3 wing, retained the Edition 2's design but added leading-edge slats back to improve handling characteristics. The variant was powered by an uprated R-27 turbojet, the Tumansky R-29-300 (izdeliye 55a), which had a dry thrust of 81.35 kN (18,290 lb_{f}) and 122.5 kN (27,500 lb_{f}) with afterburners. Plumbed pylons were also introduced to allow the MiG-23M to carry 800-litre (211 US gal) drop tanks when the wings were at full spread.

Production began at the Znamya Truda factory in 1972, and by 1974 it reached an impressive thirty-plus airframes a month, with peaks of up to forty a month. The first MiG-23Ms entered service with the 4th TsBPiPLS in 1973, soon followed by frontline VVS regiments stationed in East Germany; by the mid-1970s a small number of PVO regiments had also converted to the MiG-23M. However, problems with the airframe's structural elements and wing sweep mechanism failures resulted in a self-imposed 5-G restriction until 1977, when quality controls and strengthening measures addressed the problem and allowed for MiG-23M squadrons to conduct basic fighter maneuvers. Around 1,300 MiG-23Ms were produced for the VVS and PVO from 1972 to 1978.

MiG-23MF
("Flogger-B") This was an export derivative of the MiG-23M produced from 1978 to 1983 at Znamya Truda. One version (izdeliye 2A or 23-11A), intended for sale to the Warsaw Pact, was practically the same as the MiG-23M with small differences in communication and IFF equipment. The other (izdeliya 2B or 23-11B) was designed for sale for certain Third World client states. Like the 23-11A it featured the Sapfir-23D-III radar (redesignated Sapfir-23E), but lacked electronic counter-countermeasure (ECCM) features and had lower overall performance. Their communication equipment was also less powerful, with the Lazur-SMA datalink removed from some aircraft. Until 1981, these were delivered to customers with the R-13M missile instead of the R-60.

MiG-23MS
("Flogger-E") Another export variant, the MiG-23MS was a downgrade version of the MiG-23M designed for Third World customers who couldn't be trusted with the advanced technology of the MiG-23MF. While using the same airframe and engine as the MiG-23M, the MiG-23MS was equipped with the same weapons and equipment as the MiG-21S/SM. A downgraded export version of the RP-22SM radar gave the MiG-23MS its distinctively short nose radome, while the undernose IRST was removed. The only missiles it was capable of firing were up to four R-3S and R-3R air-to-air missiles, though the improved R-13M was added later. This variant was produced at Znamya Truda between 1973 and 1978, with fifty-four sent to Syria, eighteen to Iraq, eight to Egypt, and fifty-four to Libya. Egypt handed over several of their MiG-23MSs to China and the United States for technical evaluation.

MiG-23U
("Flogger-C") The MiG-23U was a twin-seat training variant based on the MiG-23S, first appearing six months after the single-seater's introduction. Its only major design difference was the addition of a second cockpit where the equipment bay was located, necessitating its movement into the redesigned nose. It retained the MiG-23S' GSh-23L gun with 200 rounds and could carry up to 3,000 kg (6,600 lb) of bombs. Equipped with the S-21 weapon control system centered on the Sapfir-21M radar, the MiG-23U could fire the R-3S and R-13M missiles. Also like the MiG-23 Edition 1971 and MiG-23M, a fourth fuel tank was added with a capacity of 470 litres. Production of the MiG-23U began at Irkutsk in 1971 and eventually converted to the MiG-23UB.

MiG-23UB
("Flogger-C") Another two-seat trainer, the MiG-23UB made its maiden flight on 10 April 1970, with production starting later that year at the Irkutsk Aviation Plant. It was equipped with the SAU-23UB flight control system and Polyot-11-23 navigation system, consisting of a RSBN-6S tactical aid to navigation, a SKV-2N2 reference gyro and a DV-30 and DV-10 air data system. While early production aircraft did feature the Sapfir-21M radar, it was soon replaced with ballast blocks under a conical metal fairing. Additionally, starting in 1971 production MiG-23UBs received the Edition 3 wing, and from 1979 onward those delivered to MiG-23M/ML regiments received the SOUA limiter to constrain AoA to within 28 degrees. Production of the MiG-23UB for the VVS and PVO continued until 1978, and until 1985 for export customers. More than 1,000 MiG-23UBs were produced, with 760 of these for the VVS and PVO.

MiG-23UM
("Flogger-C") A modified version of 251 MiG-23UBs. Work began in 1984 at Aircraft Factory No. 39 in Russia. They were then provided to exporting countries already operating the MiG-23U/UB.

=== Second-generation ===
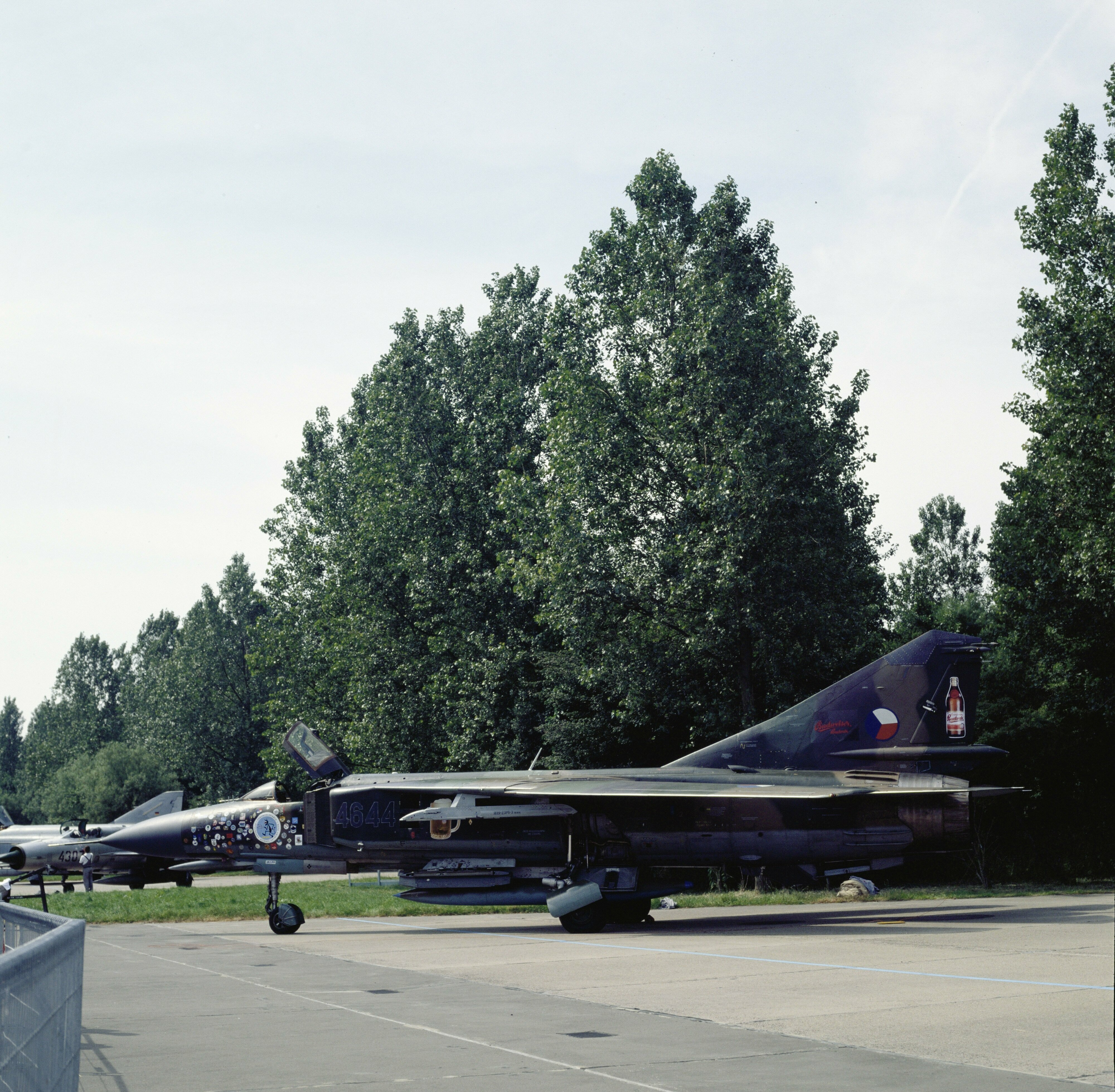
MiG-23ML operated by the Czech Air Force in 1994

MiG-23ML
("Flogger-G", Model 23-12, Izdyelie 3) The early MiG-23 variants had a number of design shortcomings, including airframe strength and reliability, engine performance, maneuverability and radar performance. A considerable redesign of the airframe was conducted, resulting in the MiG-23ML (L - Lyogkiy or lightweight), which was given the NATO designation "Flogger-G". Empty weight was reduced 1,250 kg (2,760 lb) by removing the No. 4 fuselage fuel tank. Aerodynamics were refined for less drag, with the dorsal fin extension removed. The lighter weight of the airframe and a redesign of the main undercarriage units resulted in a different sit on the ground, with the aircraft's nose at a lower attitude compared to the nose-high appearance of earlier variants. Structural weaknesses, in particular the wing pivot mechanism, were strengthened so that the airframe was now rated for a G-limit of 8.5 at speeds below Mach 0.85 and 7.5-G at faster speeds. This also allowed the angle of attack (AoA) limiter to be set to 20-22° with the wings fully swept back, and 28-30° otherwise.

A new engine model, the R-35F-300, now provided a maximum dry thrust of 83.82 kN (18,840 lb_{f}), and 128.08 kN (28,790 lb_{f}) with afterburner. This led to a considerably improved thrust-to-weight ratio of 0.83 (versus 0.77 for the MiG-23M), though in real-world conditions the ratio would be lower due to engine 'detuning', and a lower specific fuel consumption of 1.96 kg/kgf.h at maximum afterburn (versus 2.09 in the earlier R-27F2M-300). After initial issues of reliability, the time between overhauls was also extended to 450 hours, though like earlier engines it was limited to only ten hours at full military power or afterburner.

The avionics set was considerably improved as well. The S-23ML standard included Sapfir-23ML radar and TP-23M IRST. The Polyot-21-23 navigation suite, Lazur-23SML datalink, SAU-23AM flight control system, and RV-5R Reper-M radar altimeter were all improvements on previous systems. Thanks to the new SUV-2ML weapons system, the MiG-23ML could carry both types of R-23 BVR missiles, and the underwing pylons could accommodate UPK-23-250 23mm gun pods.

Overall the MiG-23ML's combat effectiveness was about 20 per cent better than the MiG-23M according to Mikoyan OKB. Instantaneous turn rate was 16.7° per second at a corner speed of 780 km/h (480 mph) and 27° AoA; average rate of turn was 14.1° per second. Completing a 360° turn at an altitude of 1,000 m (3,300 ft) took 27 seconds at an average of 6.5-G, with an entry speed of 900 km/h (560 mph) and final speed of 540 km/h (340 mph). At the same altitude, accelerating from 600 km/h (370 mph) to 1,000 km/h (620 mph) at full afterburn took 12 seconds, while the rate of climb was 215 m/s (710 ft/s), though this fell off as altitude increased. In total, the time it took a MiG-23ML to take off and reach 15,000 m (49,000 ft) while accelerating to Mach 2.1 on full afterburner was 4.3 minutes.

The MiG-23ML prototype first took flight on 21 January 1975 and quickly entered mass production later that same year, though export customers continued to receive the MiG-23MF for another seven years. More than 1,100 MiG-23MLs (and its derivatives including the MiG-23MLA) were built for Soviet and export users between 1978 and 1983.

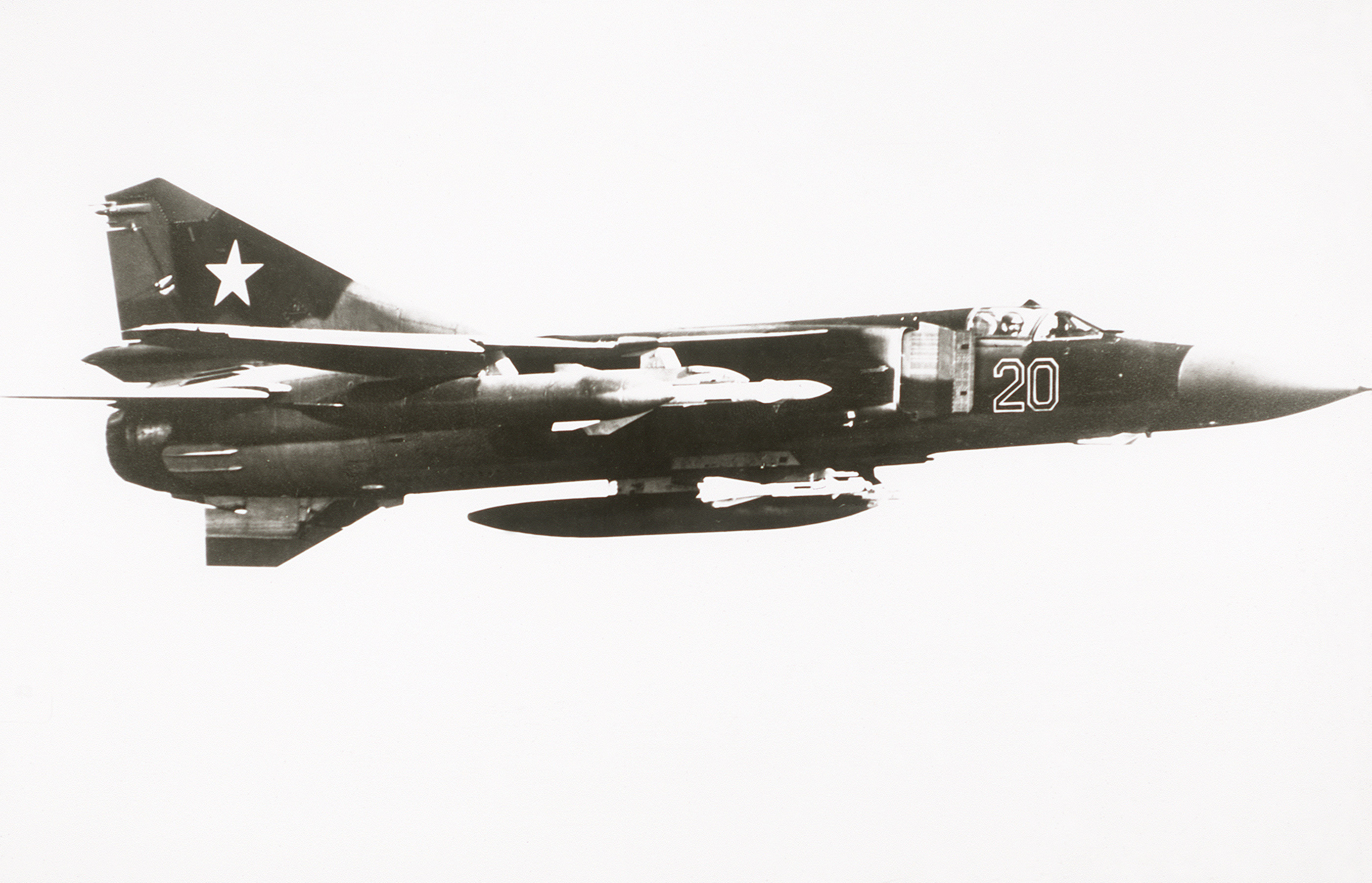
Soviet MiG-23MLA "Flogger-G"

MiG-23MLA
("Flogger-G") The later production variant of the "ML" was designated the "MiG-23MLA". The fighter first flew in 1977, with mass production beginning in 1978 and sales to foreign customers starting in 1981. Externally, the "MLA" was identical to "ML". Internally, the 'MLA' had an improved Sapfir-23MLA (N003) radar with better range, reliability and ECM resistance, and a frequency spacing feature which made co-operative group search operations possible as the radars would now not jam each other. It also had a new ASP-17ML HUD/gunsight, and starting in 1981 the capability to fire improved Vympel R-24R/T missiles. A TP-23M IRST was included, which had a maximum detection range of 15 km (9.3 mi) for a high-altitude fighter-sized target operating at full power, or 45 km (28 mi) for a bomber-sized target. However its field of scanning was restricted compared to the radar: only 60° in azimuth and 15° in elevation. As with the MiG-23MF, there were two different MiG-23ML sub-variants for export: the first version was sold to Warsaw Pact countries and was very similar to Soviet aircraft. The second variant had downgraded radar and it was sold to Third World allies.

MiG-23P
("Flogger-L", Model 23-14, Izdyelie 6) This was a specialized air-defense interceptor variant developed for the PVO Strany as an interim low-cost stopgap, replacing the Su-9/Su-11 and MiG-19P/PM still in service. The MiG-23P (P - Perekhvatchik or interceptor) had the same airframe and powerplant as the MiG-23ML, but its avionics suite was improved to meet PVO requirements and mission profiles. Its radar was the improved Sapfir-23P (N006), which could be used in conjunction with the ASP-23DTsM gunsight/HUD (later replaced with the improved ASP-17ML) for better look-down/shoot-down capabilities to counter increasing low-level threats like F-111s. The SAU-23P autopilot included a new digital computer which, operating in conjunction with the Lazur-M datalink, enabled ground-controlled interception (GCI) ground stations to steer the aircraft towards the target; in such an intercept, all the pilot had to do was control the engine and use the weapons. The MiG-23P was the most numerous PVO interceptor in the 1980s - around 500 manufactured between 1978 and 1981 - but was never exported. It also endured after the break-up of the Soviet Union, with the last MiG-23P units operating until 1998. Interestingly, in mock BVR air combat the MiG-23P when flown by experienced pilots proved to be equal or even better than the Su-27.

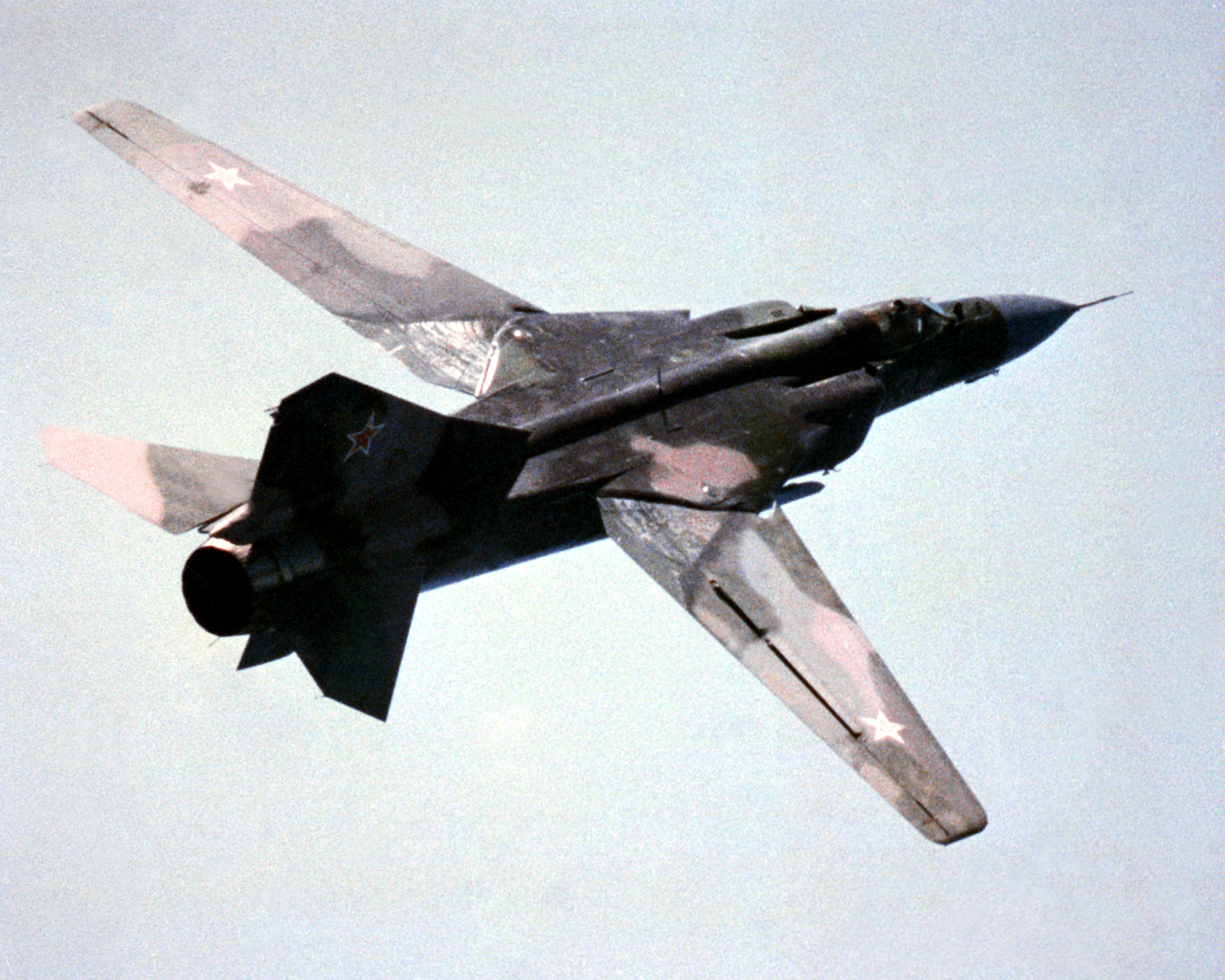
Soviet MiG-23MLD "Flogger-K"

MiG-23MLD
("Flogger-K", Model 23-18) The MiG-23MLD was the ultimate fighter variant of the MiG-23. The main focus of the upgrade was to improve maneuverability, especially during high AoA, which was identified as the MiG-23M/ML's chief shortcoming. The pitot boom was equipped with vortex generators, and the wing's notched leading edge roots were 'saw-toothed' to act as vortex generators as well. The flight-control system incorporated the SOS-3-4 synthetic stick-stop device/signals limiter being used on the MiG-29 to improve handling and safety in high-AoA maneuvers. A strengthening of the wing pivot allowed the addition of a fourth wing sweep position of 33°, which was intended to reduce turn radius and allow for rapid deceleration during dogfights. However, with the wings at the 33° position, the MiG-23MLD was much more difficult to handle and suffered from poor acceleration. Moving the wings to this position was primarily reserved for experienced MiG-23 pilots, while combat manuals continued to emphasize the 45° position.

Significant improvements were made in avionics, with the incorporation of the Sapfir-23MLA-II (N008) radar which featured greater range, reliability, ECM resistance and improved modes for look-down/shoot-down over rough terrain. The radar also featured a close-in fighting mode with vertical-scan capability covering a narrow sector in front of the fighter. Against a bomber-sized target operating at medium to high altitudes, the Sapfire-23MLA-II had a maximum detection range of 70 km (43 mi). Other improvements included the SPO-15L Beryoza radar warning receiver, A-321 Klystron digital tactical radio navigation/automatic landing system, SAU-23-18 automatic flight control system, and SARP-12-24 crash-resistant flight recorder. Survivability was improved with a pair of six-round downward-firing chaff/flare dispensers mounted in the underfuselage centerline pylon, complemented by the two thirty-round upward-firing BVP-50-60 chaff/flare dispenser.

No new-build "MLD" aircraft were delivered to the VVS, as the more advanced MiG-29 was about to enter production. Instead, all Soviet "MLD"s were former "ML/MLA" aircraft modified to "MLD" standard, with 560 examples being converted at three VVS maintenance facilities in Kubinka, Chuhuiv and Lviv from May 1982 to May 1985. As with earlier MiG-23 versions, two distinct export variants were offered. Unlike Soviet examples, these were new-build aircraft, though they lacked the aerodynamic refinements of Soviet "MLD"s; 16 examples were delivered to Bulgaria, and 50 to Syria between 1982 and 1984. These were the last single-seat MiG-23 fighters made.

=== Ground-attack variants ===
MiG-23B
("Flogger-F") Created to meet the need for a new fighter-bomber, the MiG-23B was similar to the MiG-23S but with a redesigned forward fuselage and a dielectric head just above the pylon. In the flat-bottomed, tapered-down nose was a PrNK Sokol-23 ground attack sight system in place of the radar. The system included an analogue computer, a laser rangefinder and a PBK-3 bomb sight. The navigation suite and autopilot were updated to provide more accurate bombing, while the pylons were strengthened to increase the maximum bomb payload to 3,000 kg. To improve the fighter's survivability, the Flogger-F was fitted with an electronic warfare (EW) suite, and an inert gas system was placed in the fuel tanks to prevent fires. The pilot's survivability and visibility was also enhanced by raising their seat and armoring the cockpit windscreen. Instead of the R-29 engine, the MiG-23B was fitted with the Lyulka AL-21 turbojet.

The first prototype of the MiG-23B, "32-34", flew on 20 August 1970. While it was fitted with same wing design as the MiG-23S, all subsequent models had the improved Edition 2 design. However, because the AL-21 was needed for the Sukhoi Su-17 and Su-24, only three prototypes and 24 production aircraft of the MiG-23B were produced between 1971 and 1972. Restrictions on the AL-21 also prevented the MiG-23B from being exported to foreign customers.

MiG-23B
("Flogger-A") The first Flogger attack variant was powered by the AL-21F. Only 24 were produced, due to a lack of engines (the AL-21F was destined for the Sukhoi Su-17/22 and the Su-24 Fencer). It was armed with the GSh-23L cannon, carrying 200 rounds.

MiG-23BK
("Flogger-H") An export variant reserved for Warsaw Pact countries. In addition to the PrNK-23 system, additional radar warning receivers were mounted on the intakes.

MiG-23BN
("Flogger-H") An upgraded version of the MiG-23B, the MiG-23BN differed in that it was fitted with the Edition 3 wings and R-29 engine of contemporary fighter variants, along with minor updates in electronics and equipment. The other major difference was the removal of the dielectric head found on the MiG-23B. Produced from 1973 to 1985, a total of 624 MiG-23BNs were built, although only a small number served in VVS units with the rest exported. A downgraded version intended for Third World customers proved to be fairly popular and effective. The last MiG-23BN in Indian service flew on 6 March 2009, flown by Wing Commander Tapas Ranjan Sahu of the 221 Squadron (Valiants).

MiG-23BM experimental aircraft
("Flogger-D") The predecessor to the MiG-27, this experimental variant differed from the standard MiG-23BM in that its dielectric heads were moved from the pylons to directly on the wing roots.

MiG-27 (MiG-23BM)
("Flogger-D") Introduced in 1975, simplified ground-attack version with simple pitot air intakes, no radar and a simplified engine with two position afterburner nozzle. An upgrade of the MiG-23BK, the MiG-23BM replaced the original PrNK-23 with the PrNK-23M and the analog computer with a digital computer. Introduced into service as the MiG-27.

=== Proposed variants and upgrades ===
MiG-23R
A proposed reconnaissance variant which was never finished.
MiG-23MLG (23-35)
A subvariant of the MiG-23MLD, featuring new radar, electronic warfare equipment, and helmet-mounted display, partly the same as the MiG-29.
MiG-23MLG (23-37)
A subvariant of the MiG-23MLD, electronic warfare equipment, R-73 missile.
MiG-23MLS (23-47)
A subvariant of the MiG-23MLD, electronic warfare equipment, R-73 missile.
MiG-23MLG (23-57)
A subvariant of the MiG-23MLD.
MiG-23K
A carrier-borne fighter variant based on the MiG-23ML, it was cancelled after the cancellation and subsequent redesign of the Soviet aircraft carrier project.
MiG-23A
A multi-role variant based on the MiG-23K, it was planned for three sub-variants: the MiG-23AI (fighter), MiG-23AB (ground-attack), and MiG-23AR (reconnaissance). The variant was cancelled for the same reason as the MiG-23K.
MiG-23MLK
A proposed variant which would be fitted with either two new R-33 engines or one R-100 engine.
MiG-23MD
A modification of the MiG-23M which would have been equipped with a Saphir-23MLA-2 radar.
MiG-23ML-1
A variant which would've been armed with the new R-146 missile and one of several engine configurations: a single R-100, an R-69F, or twin R-33 engines.
MiG-23-98
A proposed series of upgrades to the MiG-23 offered by Mikoyan in the late 1990s. At a cost of around US$1 million, it included new radar, self-defense suite and avionics, along with improved cockpit ergonomics, helmet-mounted display, and the ability to fire Vympel R-27 (NATO: AA-10 "Alamo"), Vympel R-73 (NATO: AA-11 "Archer") and Vympel R-77 (NATO: AA-12 "Adder") missiles. For a lesser price, the existing Sapfir-23 would be improved along with newer missiles and other avionics. Airframe life extension was offered as well.
MiG-23-98-2
An export upgrade offered to Angolan MiG-23MLs, improving the radar so they could fire new types of air-to-air and air-to-ground weapons.
MiG-23LL
(flying laboratory) These MiG-23s were constructed to test a new in-cockpit warning system which used a female voice to warn pilots about various flight parameters. A female voice was chosen specifically to provide a distinction from ground communication, which in Soviet service was virtually always male.

== Operators ==
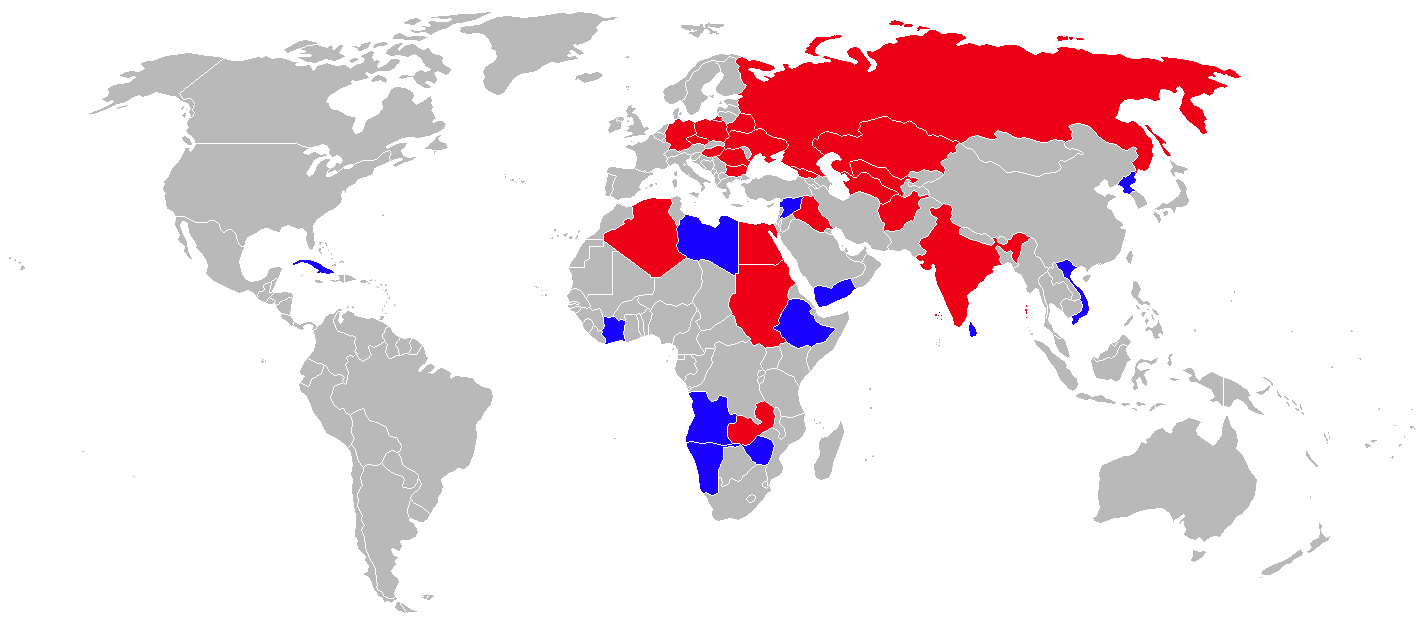
World operators of the MiG-23 (not including evaluation-only operators)

=== Current operators ===
Angola

- National Air Force of Angola – 22 MiG-23 in service as of December 2024.

Ethiopia

- Ethiopian Air Force – 9 MiG-23 in service as of December 2024.

Libya

- Libyan Air Force – 2 MiG-23BN in service with the internationally recognized Government of National Unity and 2 MiG-23ML in service with the Libyan National Army as of February 2024.

North Korea

- North Korean Air Force; 56 MiG-23 in service as of December 2024

Sudan

- Sudanese Air Force; 3 MiG-23MS/UBs in service as of December 2023. Four were refurbished locally in 2016, after nearly 20 years in storage. One was lost during testing.

=== Former operators ===
Afghanistan

- Afghan Air Force – 30 were in service in 1992; an unknown number of aircraft were shot down or destroyed on the ground during the Afghan civil war.

Algeria

- Algerian Air Force – 40 MiG-23BN ordered in 1975, with deliveries starting in 1976. 16 MiG-23MF delivered in 1982. The last aircraft were withdrawn in 2008.

Belarus

- Belarus Air Force – 35 were in service in 2000, later scrapped.

Bulgaria
Bulgarian Air Force – A total of 90 MiG-23s served the Bulgarian Air Force from 1976 to their withdrawal from service in 2004. The exact count is: 33 MiG-23BN, 12 MiG-23MF, 1 MiG-23ML, 8 MiG-23MLA, 21 MiG-23MLD and 15 MiG-23UB

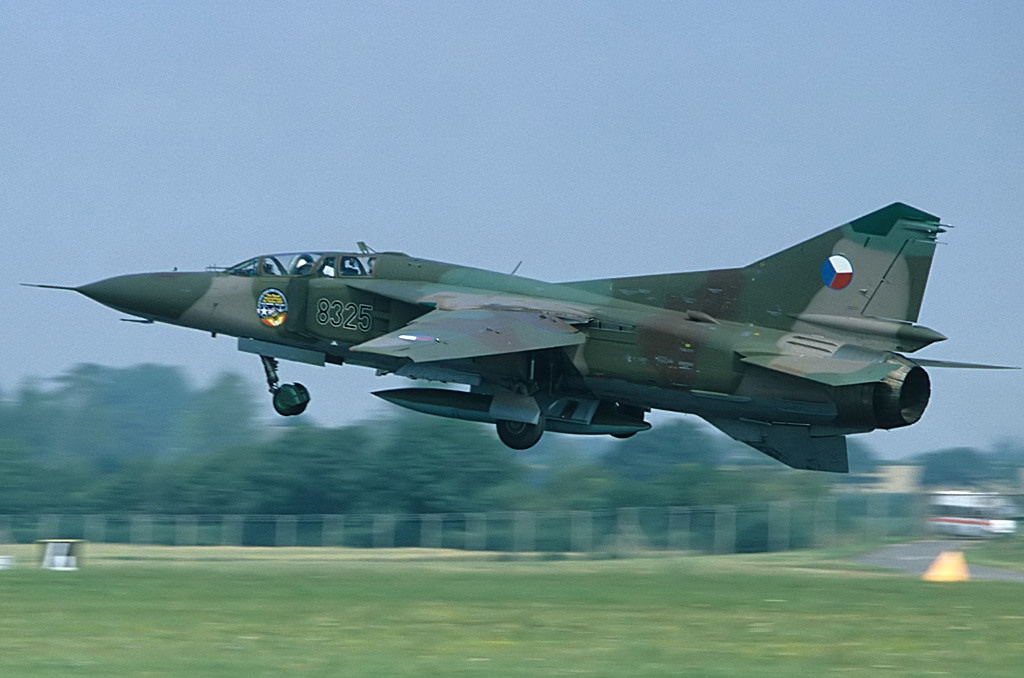
Mikoyan-Gurevich MiG-23UB

Cote d'Ivoire

- Cote d'Ivoire Air Force

Cuba

- Cuban Air Force – All fixed-wing aircraft retired in 2026.

Czech Republic

- Czech Air Force – MiG-23BN and MiG-23MF retired shortly after the dissolution of Czechoslovakia, while the MiG-23ML were retired in 1998.

Czechoslovakia

- Czechoslovak Air Force – Passed on to the Czech Republic.

Democratic Republic of the Congo

- DR Congo Air Force – 2 MiG-23s were in service as of December 2023, one used for training.

East Germany

- East German Air Force – Transferred to (West) German Air Force. The German Air Force gave two MiG-23s to the United States Air Force and one to a museum in Florida. The others were given away to others states or scrapped.

Egypt

- Egyptian Air Force – Used until Egypt turned towards Western Governments. Six MiG-23BN/MS/UBs were sent to China in exchange for military hardware; China used them to reverse engineer the MiG-23 as the Q-6 but since the Chinese could not reverse engineer the R-29 and build a reliable turbofan, the only MiG-23 elements that were used ended in the J-8II. At least eight were transferred to the US for evaluation.

Germany

- German Air Force – In 1990, the German Air Force inherited 18 MiG-23BNs, 9 MiG-23MFs, 28 MiG-23MLs, 8 MiG-23UBs from East Germany.

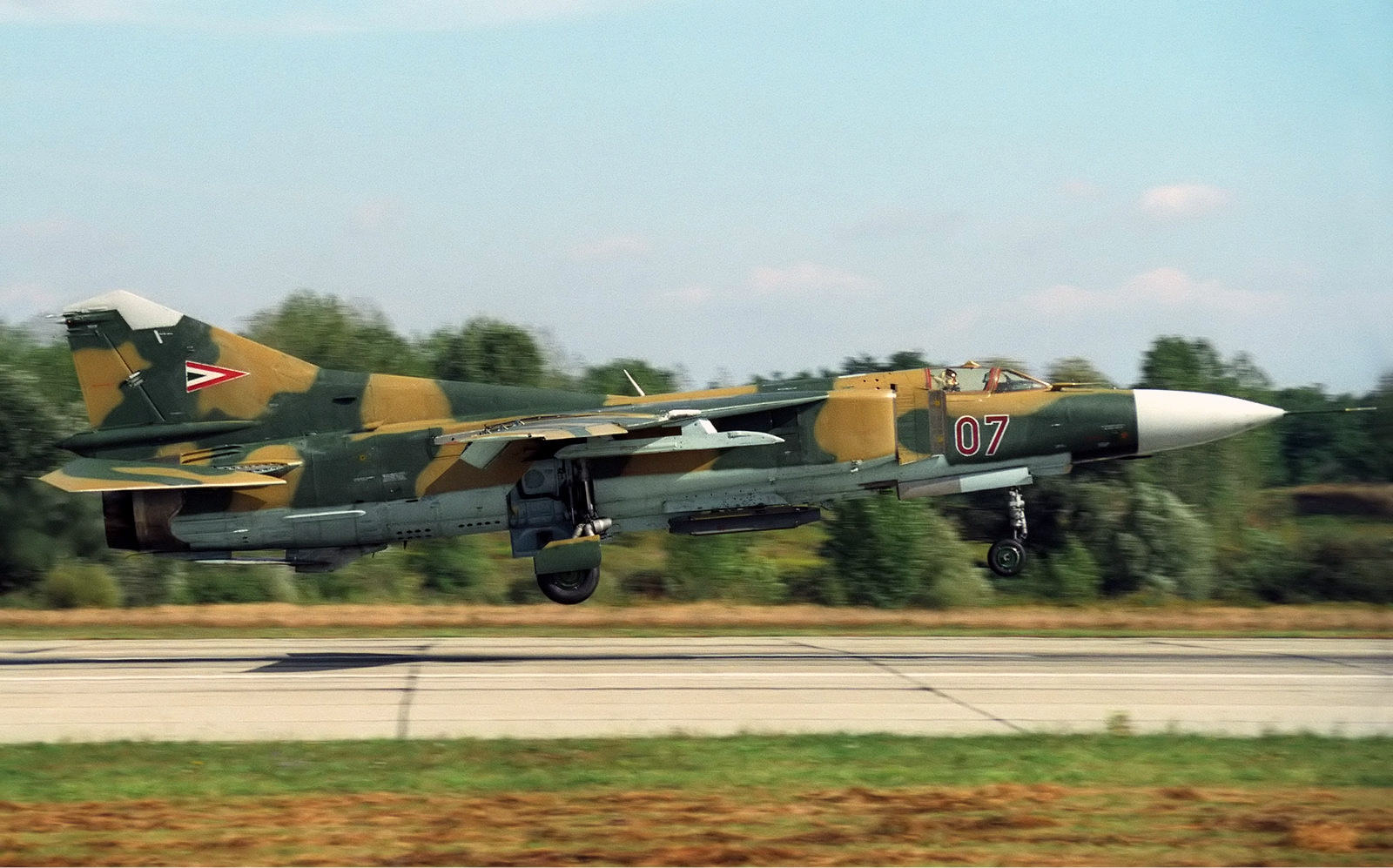
Hungarian Air Force Mikoyan-Gurevich MiG-23MF.

Hungary

- Hungarian Air Force – MiG-23MF withdrawn in 1997

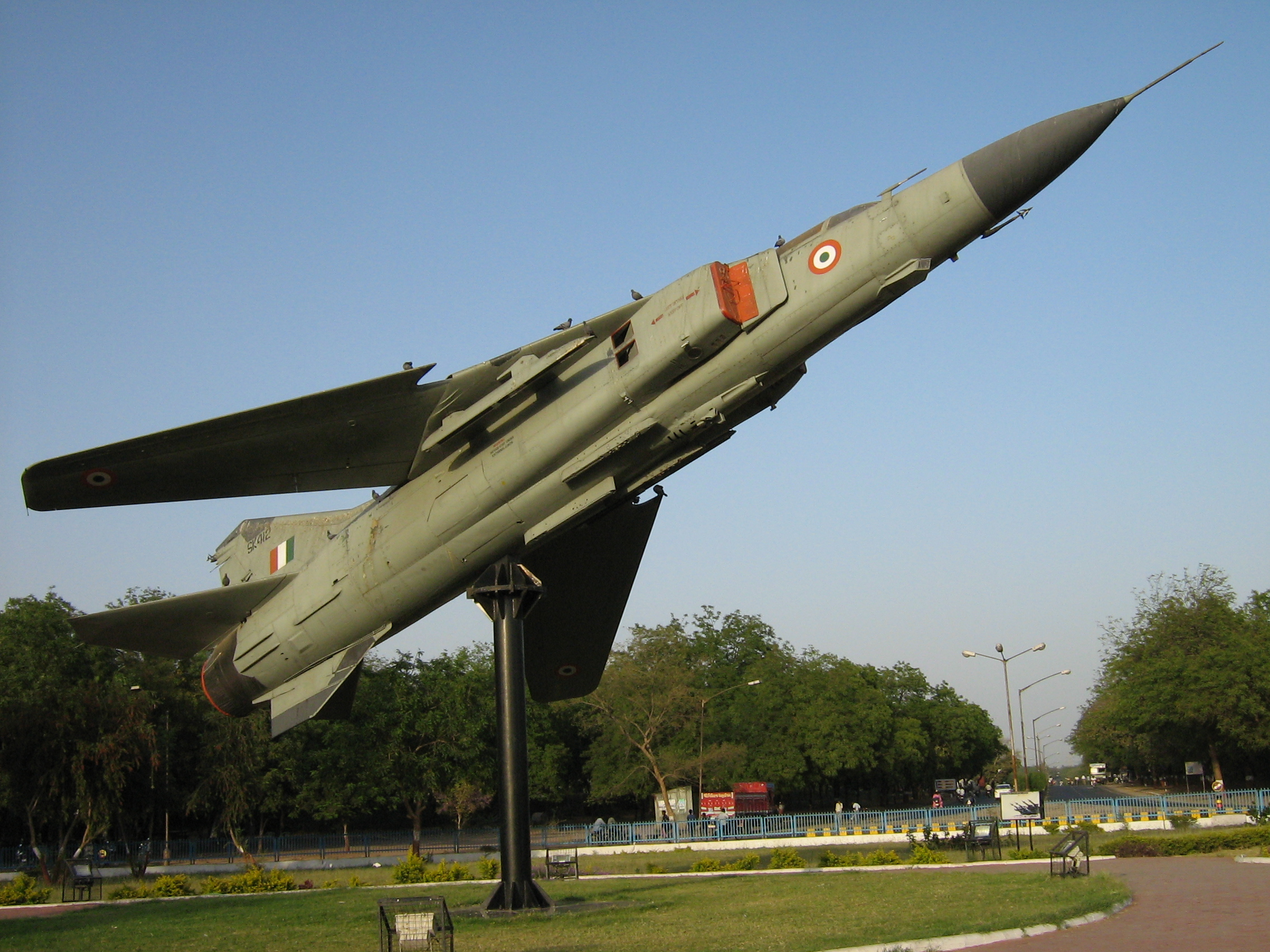
An Indian MiG-23MF on display at a crossroads in Gandhinagar.

India

- Indian Air Force – The MiG-23BN ground attack aircraft was phased out on 6 March 2009, and the MiG-23MF air defence interceptor phased out in 2007. 14 MiG 23UB trainers in service according to "World Air Forces 2020"

Iraq

- Iraqi Air Force – Used until the fall of Saddam Hussein. 12 MiG-23s flown to Iran in 1991.
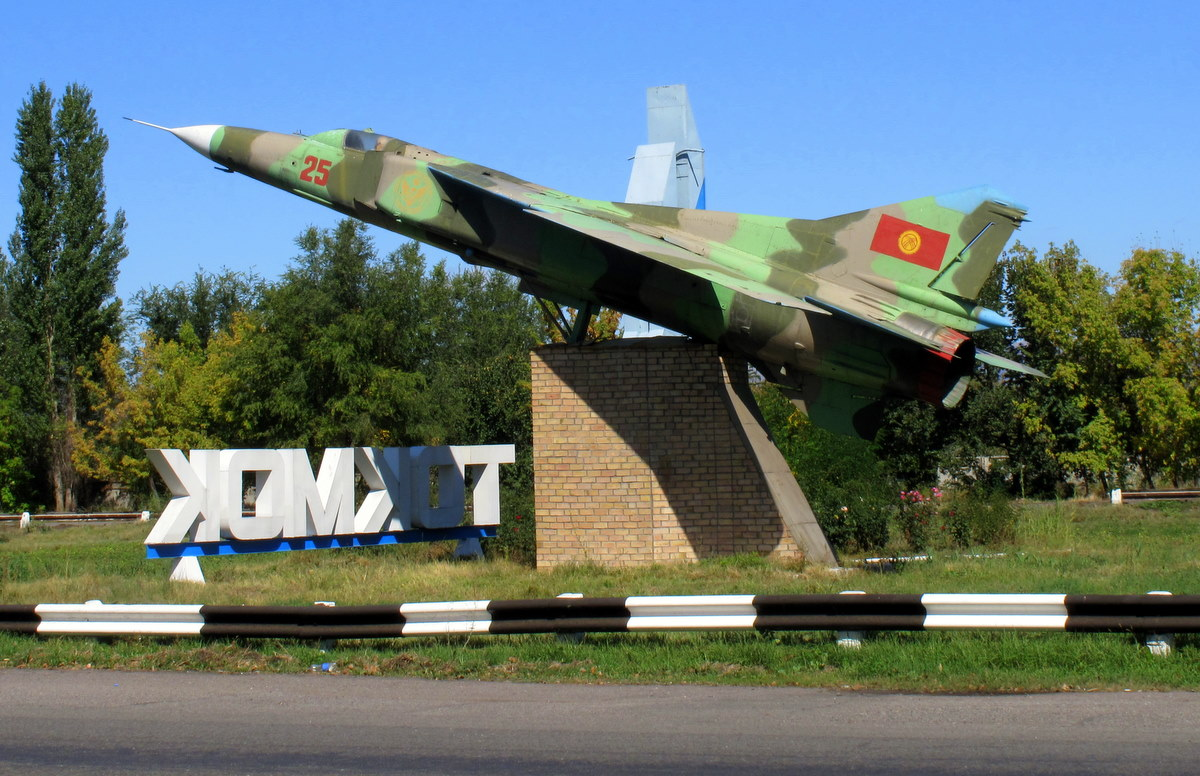
  Kyrgyzstan MiG-23 on display in Tokmok.

Kazakhstan

- Kazakh Air Defense Forces – 2 MiG-23UB in storage for sale as of February 2024.

Libyan Arab Jamahiriya

- Libyan Air Force – Had 130 MiG-23MS/ML/BN/UBs in service (most in storage) prior to the First Libyan Civil War. What remains has been passed on to the successor government or other rebel factions.

Namibia

- Namibian Air Force – Had two MiG-23 aircraft in service.

Poland

- Polish Air Force – A total of 36 MiG-23MF single-seaters and six MiG-23UB trainers were delivered to the Polish Air Force between 1979 and 1982. The last of them were withdrawn in September 1999. During the period four planes were lost in accidents.

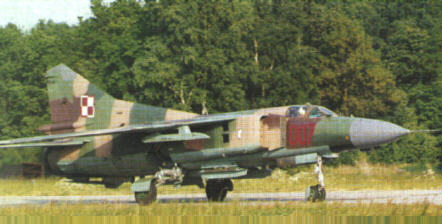
Polish Air Force MiG-23

Romania

- Romanian Air Force – A total of 46 MiG-23 served from 1979 until 2001 and were withdrawn in 2003; the exact count is: 36 MiG-23MF and 10 MiG-23UB.

Russia

- Russian Air Force – Approximately 500, all in reserve.

Soviet Union
Passed on to successor states

- Soviet Air Force
- Soviet Anti-Air Defence
- Soviet Naval Aviation

Sri Lanka

- Sri Lanka Air Force – One MiG-23UB trainer used only for training purposes for their MiG-27M fleet

Syria

- Syrian Arab Air Force – 87 MiG-23 were in service as of December 2024. The Syrian government of Al-Assad fell to rebels in late 2024, and the Syrian Arab Air Force was dismantled. It was re-established as Syrian Air Force, but the revolution, and the Israeli air strikes that followed it, wrecked havoc in the inventory of the Air Force. At least 60 MiG-23s were destroyed during Operation Bashan Arrow according to Israeli claims. In late 2025, the World Air Forces publication by FlightGlobal, which tracks the aircraft inventories of world's air forces and publishes its counts annually, removed all Syrian Air Force's aircraft from their World Air Forces 2026 report. It is thus questionable if the Syrian Air Force has any flying aircraft in their inventory, and in particular, any MiG-23, as of December 2025.

Turkmenistan

- Turkmen Air Force – 172 MiG-23M were kept in reserve in 1999
- Turkmen Air Defence Force – 48 MiG-23M and 10 MiG-23U in service in 1999

Uganda

- Ugandan Air Force – Received 2 MiG-23BNs from Libya in 2002

Ukraine

- Ukrainian Air Force – 80 MiG-23 in 1992
- Ukrainian Air Defence Forces – 110 MiG-23 in 1992

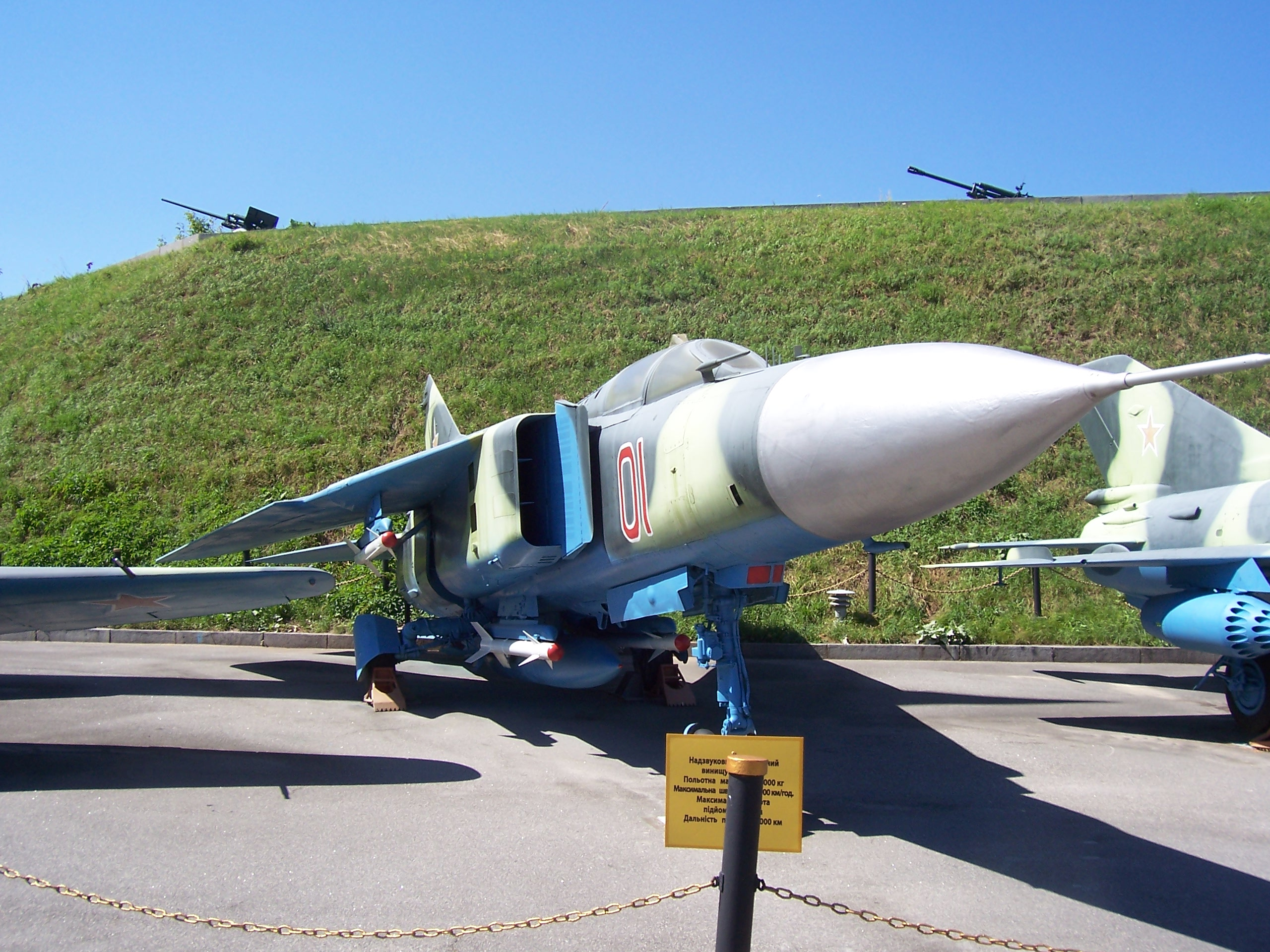
Ukrainian MiG-23 on display at the National Museum of the History of Ukraine in the Second World War, Kyiv

Zimbabwe

- Air Force of Zimbabwe – 3 in service as of December 2024. Retired as of 2026.

=== Evaluation only users ===
China

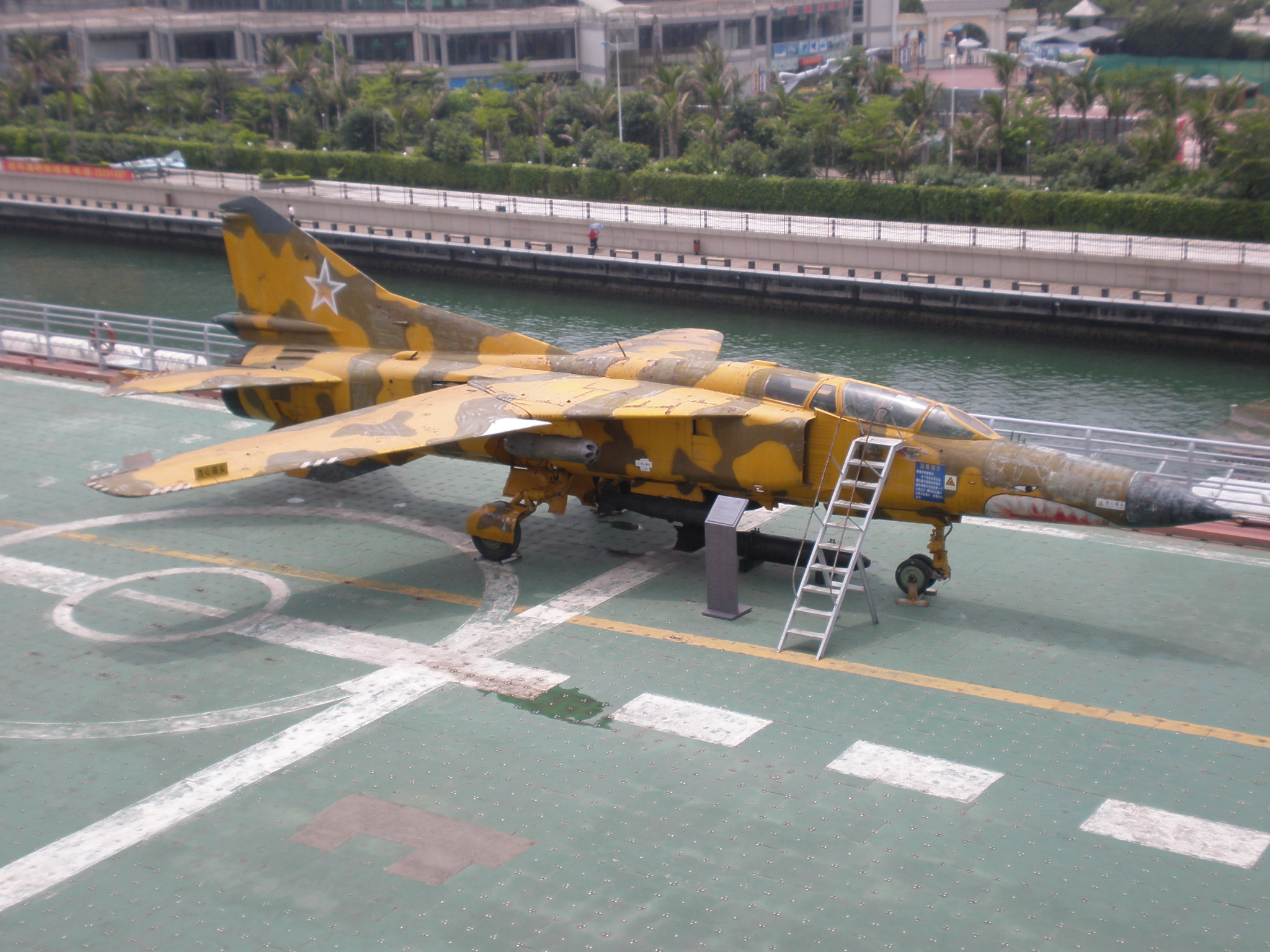
MiG-23 on display at the Minsk World theme park in Shenzhen, PRC

- MiG-23s were obtained from Egypt, and an attempt to incorporate its variable wing design into their Nanchang Q-6. The program did not go ahead and the Q-6 was not built, but some features from the MiG-23 features were incorporated into the J-8II. China currently displays the MiG-23 in several air museums.

Israel

- One ex-Syrian MiG-23 flown by a defecting pilot to Israel.

United States

- Samples obtained from Egypt and were mostly stationed in Nellis Air Force Base. The U.S. Air Force operated a small number of MiG-23s, officially designated YF-113, as both test and evaluation aircraft and in an aggressor role for fighter pilot training, from 1977 through 1988 in a program codenamed "Constant Peg".

(Socialist Federal Republic of Yugoslavia) (Federal Republic of Yugoslavia) Yugoslavia

- Some ex-Iraqi MiG-23s have been used by Flight Test Center (VOC) in the early 1990s.

=== Civilian operators ===
United States
According to the FAA in 2009, there were 11 privately owned MiG-23s in the United States.

- Two ex-Czech aircraft, N51734 and N5106E, are registered for civilian use in the United States and are based at New Castle Airport in Wilmington, Delaware.
- An ex-Bulgarian VVS aircraft, N923UB, is operational and on display at the Cold War Air Museum near Dallas, Texas.

== Accidents and incidents ==
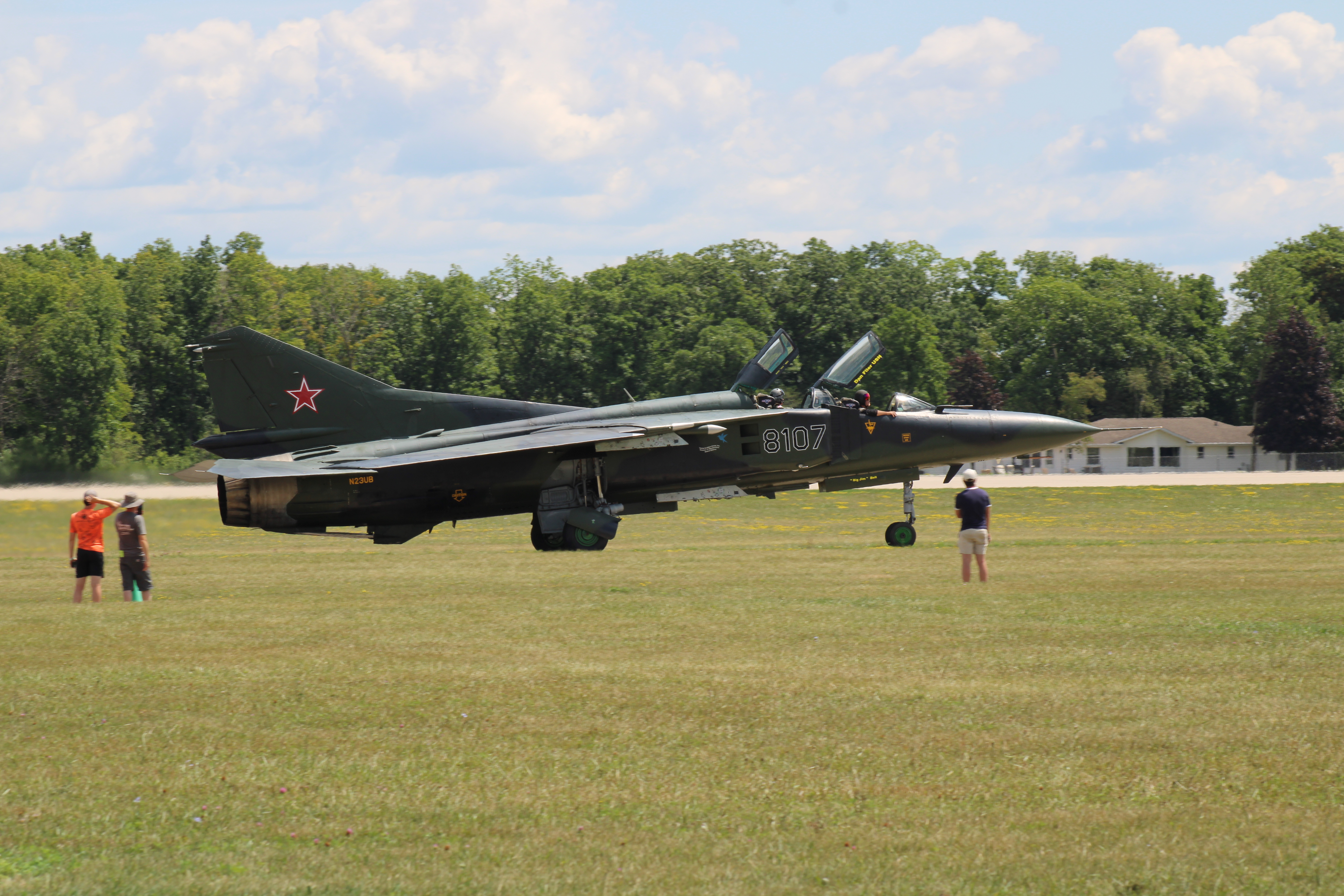
N23UB, the MiG-23UB involved in the 13 August 2023 crash, at EAA AirVenture Oshkosh two weeks before the accident

- 18 July 1980: three weeks after the loss of Itavia Flight 870, the wreckage of a Libyan MiG-23 and the remains of its pilot were discovered on the Sila Mountains at Castelsilano, southern Italy, around 300 km (190 mi) from Flight 870's crash site.
- 26 April 1984: U.S. Air Force Lieutenant General Robert M. Bond was killed when the MiG-23 he was piloting crashed at the Nevada Test Site. At the time of the mishap, Lt. Gen. Bond was serving as Vice Commander of Air Force Systems Command at Andrews Air Force Base, Maryland, U.S.
- 4 July 1989: a stray Soviet MiG-23M flew 900 km (600 mi) with no one at the controls after the pilot had ejected shortly after takeoff, eventually crashing into a house in Belgium killing one person.
- 22 December 1992: a Libyan Boeing 727 collided with a Libyan Air Force MiG-23 near Tripoli, causing the death of all 157 people on board the jetliner.
- 13 August 2023: a MiG-23UB performing at the Thunder Over Michigan airshow at Willow Run Airport crashed into a parking lot of an apartment complex near Belleville Lake in Van Buren Township, Michigan following ejection of the pilots, causing material damage to vehicles but no injuries or deaths.

== Specifications (MiG-23MLD) ==
3-view drawing of MiG-23MF

Data from Brassey's world aircraft & systems directory, 1996/97 Jet Fighter MiG-23. Protecting the skies of the Motherland,

General characteristics

- Crew: 1 sat on a Mikoyan KM-1M ejection seat
- Length: 16.7 m (54 ft 9 in)
- Wingspan: 13.965 m (45 ft 10 in) fully spread

7.779 m (25.52 ft) fully-swept

- Height: 4.82 m (15 ft 10 in)
- Wing area: 37.35 m^{2} (402.0 sq ft) fully-spread

34.16 m^{2} (367.7 sq ft) fully-swept

- Airfoil: root: TsAGI SR-12S (6.5%); tip: TsAGI SR-12S (5.5%)
- Gross weight: 14,840 kg (32,717 lb)
- Max takeoff weight: 17,800 kg (39,242 lb)
- Fuel capacity: 4,260 L (1,130 US gal; 940 imp gal) internal with provision for up to 3x 800 L (210 US gal; 180 imp gal) drop-tanks
- Powerplant: 1 × Khatchaturov R-35-300 afterburning turbojet, 83.6 kN (18,800 lbf) thrust with variable-geometry nozzles dry, 127.49 kN (28,660 lbf) with afterburner

Performance

- Maximum speed: 2,500 km/h (1,600 mph, 1,300 kn) / M2.35 at altitude

1,400 km/h (870 mph; 760 kn) / M1.14 at sea level

- Range: 1,900 km (1,200 mi, 1,000 nmi) clean
- Combat range: 1,450 km (900 mi, 780 nmi) with standard armament, no drop-tanks

2,360 km (1,470 mi; 1,270 nmi) with standard armament and 3x 800 L (210 US gal; 180 imp gal) drop-tanks

- Ferry range: 2,360 km (1,470 mi, 1,270 nmi) with 3x 800 L (210 US gal; 180 imp gal) drop-tanks
- Service ceiling: 18,500 m (60,700 ft)
- g limits: +8.5
- Rate of climb: 230 m/s (45,000 ft/min) at sea level
- Wing loading: 370 kg/m^{2} (76 lb/sq ft)
- Thrust/weight: 0.91
- Take-off distance: 450 m (1,480 ft)
- Landing distance: 690 m (2,260 ft)

Armament

- Guns: 1 × 23 mm Gryazev-Shipunov GSh-23L autocannon with 200 rounds
- Hardpoints: 2 × fuselage, 2 × wing glove and 2 × wing pylons with a capacity of up to 2,000 kg (4,400 lb) of stores, with provisions to carry combinations of:
  - Rockets:
    - S-5
    - S-8M
    - S-24B
  - Missiles:
    - Air-to-air missiles:
      - 8 × R-60 or 4 x R-73
      - 2 × R-23 or R-24/24M
      - 2 × R-13M or R-13M1
      - 4 × R-3S
    - Air-to-surface missiles:
      - Kh-23 Grom
  - Bombs: Up to 500 kg (1,100 lb) bombs per hardpoint

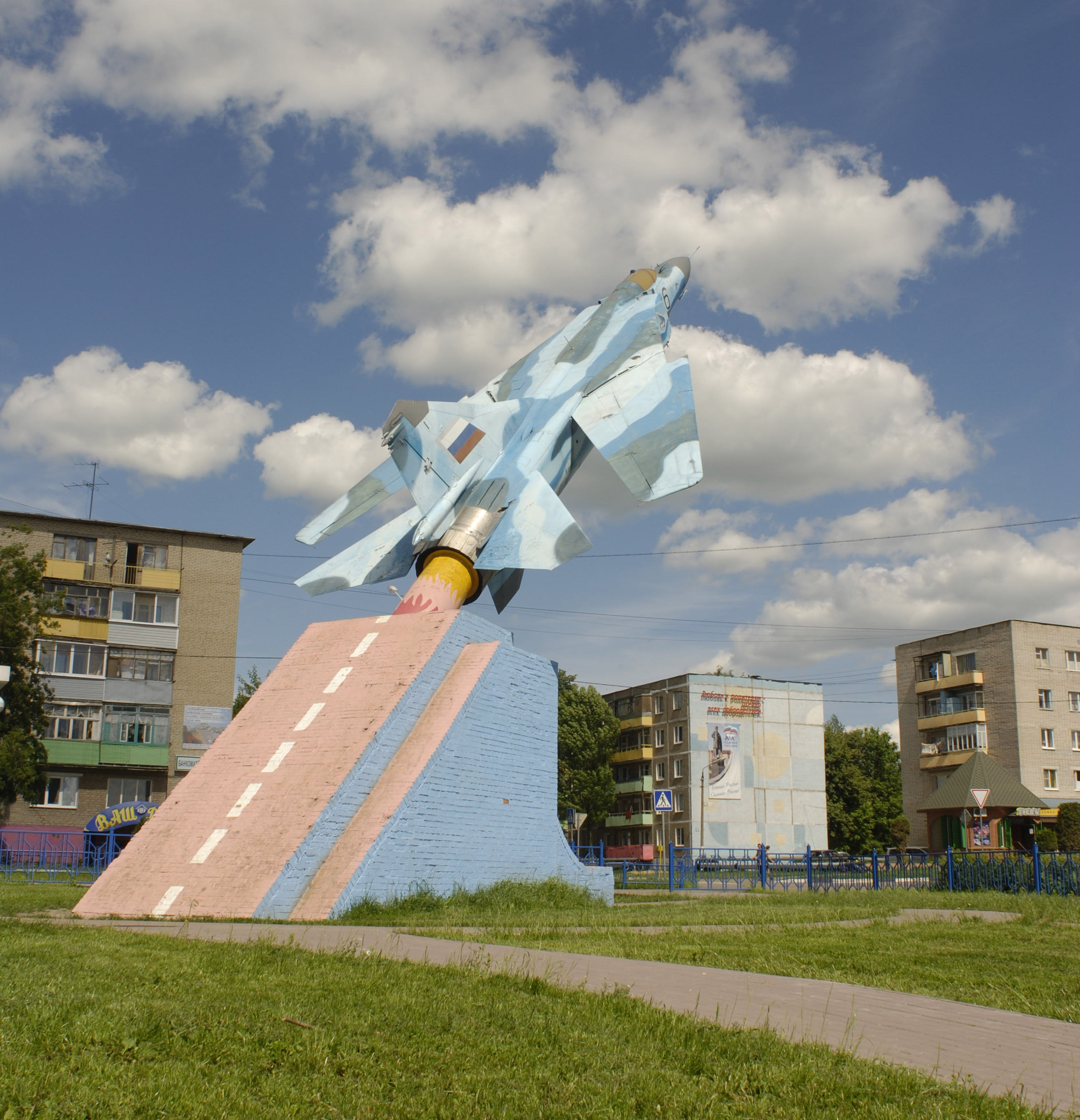
MiG-23 monument

== See also ==
- 1989 Belgian MiG-23 crash

Related development

- Mikoyan MiG-27
- Mikoyan-Gurevich 23-01

Aircraft of comparable role, configuration, and era

- Dassault Mirage F1
- Northrop F-5E Tiger II
- General Dynamics F-111
- Shenyang J-8
- Sukhoi Su-24

Related lists

- List of fighter aircraft
- List of Iranian aerial victories during the Iran–Iraq war
- List of Iraqi aerial victories during the Iran–Iraq war
- List of military aircraft of the Soviet Union and the CIS

== Bibliography ==
- Babich, Vladimir (1999). Истребители МиГ-23 в Ливанской войне [MiG-23 Fighters in the Lebanon War]. Авиация и время [Aviation and Time] (in Russian) (2).
- Belyakov, R.A.; Marmain, J. (1994). MiG: Fifty Years of Secret Aircraft Design. Shrewsbury, UK: Airlife Publishing. ISBN 1-85310-488-4.
- Cooper, Tom (July–August 2002). "'Floggers" in Action: Early MiG-23s in Operational Service". Air Enthusiast. No. 100. pp. 56–67. ISSN 0143-5450.
- Cooper, Tom (2018). MiG-23 Flogger in the Middle East, Mikoyan i Gurevich MiG-23 in Service in Algeria, Egypt, Iraq, Libya and Syria, 1973-2018. Warwick: Helion & Company Publishing. ISBN 978-1-912390-32-8.
- Cooper, Tom; Dildy, Douglas (2016). F-15C Eagle Vs MiG-23/25: Iraq 1991. London: Osprey Publishing. ISBN 978-1-4728-1271-1.
- Cooper, Tom; Grandolini, Albert; Delalande, Arnaud (2015). Libyan Air Wars, Part 1: 1973-1985. Solihull: Helion & Company Publishing. ISBN 978-1-909982-39-0.
- Cooper, Tom; Grandolini, Albert; Delalande, Arnaud (2016a). Libyan Air Wars, Part 2: 1985-1986. Solihull: Helion & Company Publishing. ISBN 978-1-910294-53-6.
- Cooper, Tom; Grandolini, Albert; Delalande, Arnaud (2016b). Libyan Air Wars, Part 3: 1986-1989. Solihull: Helion & Company Publishing. ISBN 978-1-910294-54-3.
- Davies, Steve; Dildy, Doug (2007). F-15 Eagle Engaged: The World's Most Successful Jet Fighter. London: Osprey Publishing. ISBN 978-1-84603-169-4.
- Davies, Steve (2008). Red Eagles: America's Secret MiGs. Oxford: Osprey Publishing. ISBN 978-1-84603-970-6.
- Eden, Paul, ed. (2004). The Encyclopedia of Modern Military Aircraft. London: Amber Books. ISBN 1-904687-84-9.
- Hoyle, Craig (2021). "World Air Forces 2022". Flight International.
- Gordon, Yefim; Dexter, Keith (2005). MiG-23/27: Soviet Swing-Wing Fighter/Strike Aircraft. Hinckley, UK: Midland Publishing. ISBN 1-85780-211-X.
- Gunston, Bill (1995). The Osprey Encyclopedia of Russian Aircraft 1875–1995. London: Osprey. ISBN 1-85532-405-9.
- Hoyle, Craig, ed. (December 2024). World Air Forces 2025 (Report). Flight Global Insight.
- Ilyin, Vladimir (2000). МиГ-23: долгий путь к совершенству [MiG-23: Long Path to Perfection]. Авиация и время [Aviation and Time] (in Russian) (2).
- International Institute for Strategic Studies (2000). The Military Balance 2000-2001. Oxford University Press. ISBN 978-0-19-929003-1.
- Koenig, William; Scofield, Peter (1983). Soviet Military Power. Greenwich, Connecticut: Bison Books. ISBN 0-86124-127-4.
- Lake, John (Spring 1992). "Mikoyan MiG-23/27 Flogger". World Air Power Journal. 8: 40–45. ISBN 1-874023-73-5. ISSN 0959-7050.
- Markovskiy, Victor (1997). "Жаркое небо Афганистана: Часть IX" [Hot Sky of Afghanistan: Part IX]. Авиация и время [Aviation and Time] (in Russian) (3).
- Mladenov, Alexander (June 2004). "Mikoyan MiG-23 Floggers". Air International. 66 (6): 44–49. ISSN 0306-5634.
- Mladenov, Alexander (2016). Soviet Cold War Fighters. United Kingdom: Fonthill Media. ISBN 978-1-78155-496-8.
- Peck, Gaillard R. Jr. (2012). America's Secret MiG Squadron: The Red Eagles of Project CONSTANT PEG. Oxford: Osprey Publishing. ISBN 978-1-84908-976-0.
- Sweetman, Bill; Gunston, Bill (1978). Soviet Air Power: An Illustrated Encyclopedia of the Warsaw Pact Air Forces Today. London: Salamander Books. ISBN 0-517-24948-0.
