= Folding wing =

Aircraft wing capable of being folded for storage

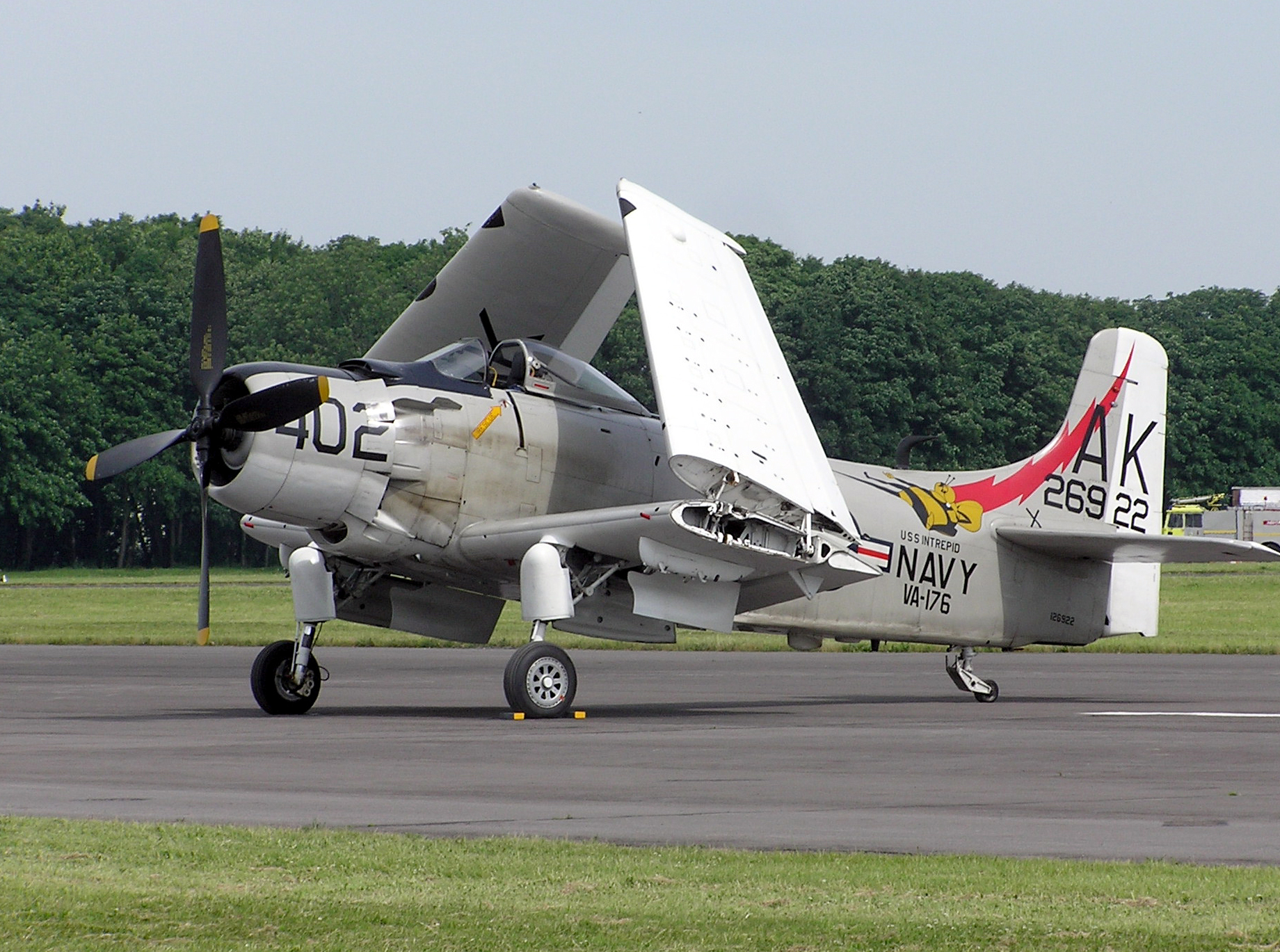
Douglas A-1 Skyraider

Folding wings are design features incorporated into aircraft to reduce the amount of space a plane takes up on a deck or other surface, so that more aircraft can be parked in a given area. They are most frequently found on aircraft intended to operate from aircraft carriers, where stowage space on flight decks and hangar decks is at a premium; however, during World War I, in particular, the feature was also used on very large bomber aircraft operating from land, to allow them to fit into hangars designed for smaller aircraft. More recently wing folding has been incorporated into light civil aircraft, to allow their storage in car garages.

A folding wing has some disadvantages compared to a non-folding wing. It is heavier and has more complex connections for electrical, fuel, aerodynamic, and structural systems.

== History ==
Historically there have always been aircraft small enough that a reduction in planform for shipboard storage was not considered necessary. These included most fighter aircraft of the 1910-1940 period, plus a handful of later types, including the Douglas SBD Dauntless and A4D/A-4 Skyhawk, and the Brewster F2A Buffalo (all USN types); the Mitsubishi A5M and Yokosuka D4Y (Japanese); and the Sea Harrier (British). All six are relatively compact designs. Carrier planes with non-folding wings which were still in use as of 2021 include the Dassault Rafale, the Lockheed Martin F-35B, and the McDonnell Douglas AV-8B Harrier. Larger aircraft, however, required a reduction in the amount of horizontal space they took up on a deck before they could be operated efficiently aboard a carrier.

Folding wings began to be incorporated into aircraft within a decade of the Wright Brothers' first flight in 1903. Short Brothers, the world's first series manufacturer of aircraft, developed and patented folding wing mechanisms for biplane ship-borne aircraft. The company developed a series of aircraft, known collectively as Short Folders, with the first patent for their folding wings being granted in 1913. Altogether ten models were characterized as Folders, of which one, the Short 184, was built in very substantial numbers (936), and others in some quantity. The folding mechanism on these aircraft involved the use of hinges on the trailing edge of each wing, at a break point not far from the fuselage; latches on the leading edge could be released, and the wings then swung backward, pivoting on the hinges, with their surfaces remaining horizontal, to end up adjacent to the fuselage, with their long axes parallel to the fuselage, giving the plane a very narrow planform. This became the standard method of wing folding for the next 20 years, and was even adopted for some early shipboard monoplanes (notably the Fairey Fulmar fighter of 1940).

This was not, however, the earliest folding-wing system to be incorporated into an airplane. In 1910 the Breguet company introduced its Type III aircraft, featuring a folding wing mechanism that was intended to reduce wingspan so that the plane could be transported by road (towed behind a car) or rail (on a flatcar) without disassembly. The Breguet mechanism was in many ways similar to the Grumman Sto-Wing mechanism of the 1940s, although it was, in some ways, more complex because the Breguet machine was a biplane. On the Type III the upper and lower wings on each side incorporated breaks very close to the fuselage. Main spars--the principal structural elements in the wings--located not far behind the leading edges of the wings incorporated hinges at the break points, with locking mechanisms near the trailing edges holding the wings in place while in flight. To fold the wings the outer panels of the wings could be unlocked and then rotated relative to the center section, with the spars serving as the axles around which the rotation took place. The folding process involved rotating the lower wing's leading edge downward 90 degrees, while the upper wing's leading edge was rotated upward 90 degrees, leaving the portions of the wings that lay behind the spars when in flight lying flat against one another, oriented vertically, much like overlapping shakes on the side of a house. The upper and lower wings could then be folded back together, swinging backward at the hinges in the spars to lie flush against the sides of the fuselage. The folding system did not even require interplane struts to be detached; these, too, were hinged, and lay flat against the outward-facing surfaces of the wing panels when folded, serving to hold the wings together even in the folded position.

As noted earlier, during World War I folding wings were incorporated into both carrier planes and large bombers. Among the machines in the latter category Britain’s Handley Page Type O series and the United States’ Martin MB series both incorporated Short-type folding wings. As for carrier planes, while fighter aircraft, as often as not, made do without folding wings, most larger aircraft incorporated the feature straight through the interwar period. British types fitted with Short-type folding wings included the Blackburn Ripon, Baffin, and Shark, and Fairey Swordfish and Albacore torpedo bombers; the Hawker Osprey fighter-reconnaissance plane; the Fairey IIIF spotter aircraft; the Supermarine Walrus shipboard flying boat; and the diminutive Parnall Peto fighter, intended for deployment aboard submarines. The Fairey Barracuda torpedo plane and the Fairey Fulmar fighter, both World War II monoplanes, also used this mechanism. Other military machines fitted with this sort of mechanism included the American Curtiss CS, Martin T3M and T4M, and the Japanese Mitsubishi B2M and Yokosuka B3Y and B4Y torpedo planes; the Curtiss SOC Seagull float-reconnaissance plane; numerous aircraft from the French Levasseur company; and the German land-based observation monoplane, the Fieseler Fi 156 Storch. A number of planes aimed at the civilian market, including the Parnall Elf of 1929 and numerous 21st century light planes (including many gliders), have also incorporated this type of wing-folding, to make stowage in home facilities (car garages) possible.

In the 1930s, with monoplanes coming into service, alternate types of folding wing began to appear. One type that became common incorporated a more literal folding of the wings: wings were hinged at break points about a third of the way out from the fuselage toward the tip, so that the outer panels could fold upward, leaving the wingtips close together and elevated over the fuselage of the plane, with the wingspan drastically reduced, though the height was marginally increased. This mechanism appears to have first been used on the Douglas TBD Devastator torpedo bomber, first flown in 1935, and the Vought SB2U Vindicator dive-bomber, first flown in early 1936, and has been seen on other carrier planes worldwide for ever since.

On some jets (the McDonnell-Douglas F/A-18 Hornet and the Soviet Yakovlev Yak-38 being notable examples) the wings are short enough that, even though some reduction in plan through folding was deemed desirable by the designers, all that was necessary was to provide for short segments of the wing tips to be folded up to a vertical position. Another refinement, which first appeared on Grumman's S2F (S-2) Tracker of 1954, and was later used on its C-1 Trader derivative and the Lockheed S3 Viking multirole aircraft of the 1970s, involved the incorporation of asymmetric hinging on the wings: all these were high-wing aircraft, and the asymmetric hinging allowed the wing panels, when folded, to extend all the way across the fuselage, with both lying nearly flat across the center section, with one in front of the other. This allowed them to fold at break points nearer the fuselage than in earlier aircraft, so that the width as well as the height of the stowed aircraft were minimized.

A third concept for wing folding emerged around the same time as the vertical fold system of the SB2U, on Britain's counterpart to that plane, the Blackburn Skua dive bomber, which first flew about a year after the Vindicator. This monoplane, interestingly, incorporated a wing folding mechanism very similar to that for which the Grumman company, several years later, would receive a patent and considerable credit. On the Skua the leading edges of the wings would rotate upward as they were folded backward, leaving them roughly flush against the fuselage sides, with the leading edges pointing skyward and the lower surfaces of the wing panels facing away from the fuselage. In contrast, in the Grumman “Sto-Wing” mechanism, first used on the Martlet II (Royal Navy; later adopted, in slightly modified form, as the F4F-4 Wildcat by the U. S. Navy) of 1940, the leading edges of the wings rotated downward as the wing panels folded back, leaving the wings, again, flush against the fuselage, but with the leading edges pointing downward and the upper surfaces facing away from the fuselage. One other difference was that the Skua’s folding mechanism (used again on the Fairey Firefly of 1941) was powered, actuated by the pilot after the ground crew had released latches holding the wings in flying position; Grumman’s first folding-wing prototype incorporated power actuation, but, as a weight saving measure, it was decided to omit this feature from production aircraft.

Grumman used the Sto-Wing mechanism on many other aircraft over succeeding decades, including the TBF/TBM Avenger torpedo bomber, the F6F Hellcat fighter, the AF Guardian anti-submarine warfare (ASW) aircraft, the E-1 Tracer early warning aircraft, and the E-2 Hawkeye/C-2 Greyhound series of early warning aircraft and cargo planes; a powered mechanism was adopted for the E-2/C-2, simply because of the enormous size of the planes’ wings.

In modern times folding surfaces are rare among land-based designs and are used almost exclusively on aircraft that are too tall or too wide to fit inside service hangars. Examples include the Boeing B-50 Superfortress and its folding tail. The Boeing 377 Stratocruiser, the Saab 37 Viggen, and the Lockheed S-3 Viking also had foldable vertical fins that reduced their height for hangar stowage. The Boeing 777 (classic) twinjet wide-body airliner was offered with folding wingtips for confined airports, though this option was never ordered. The newer Boeing 777X features a shorter and simpler folding wingtip than was planned for the earlier Boeing 777, which will provide an extra 7 metres (23 ft) of total wingspan in flight, while allowing the airplane to approach the same airport gates as the 777-200LR/777-300ER.

A few aircraft of the 1950s and 1960s, including the Mikoyan-Gurevich MiG-23 and the derivative MiG-27, the Lockheed YF-12, the Vought XF8U-3 Crusader III, and the North American XB-70 Valkyrie were equipped with ventral fins under the fuselage to increase stability at high supersonic speeds and, at least in the case of the XB-70, to increase compression lift; these fins had to be made foldable to keep them from scraping the ground during takeoffs and landings.

== Alternatives to wing folding ==
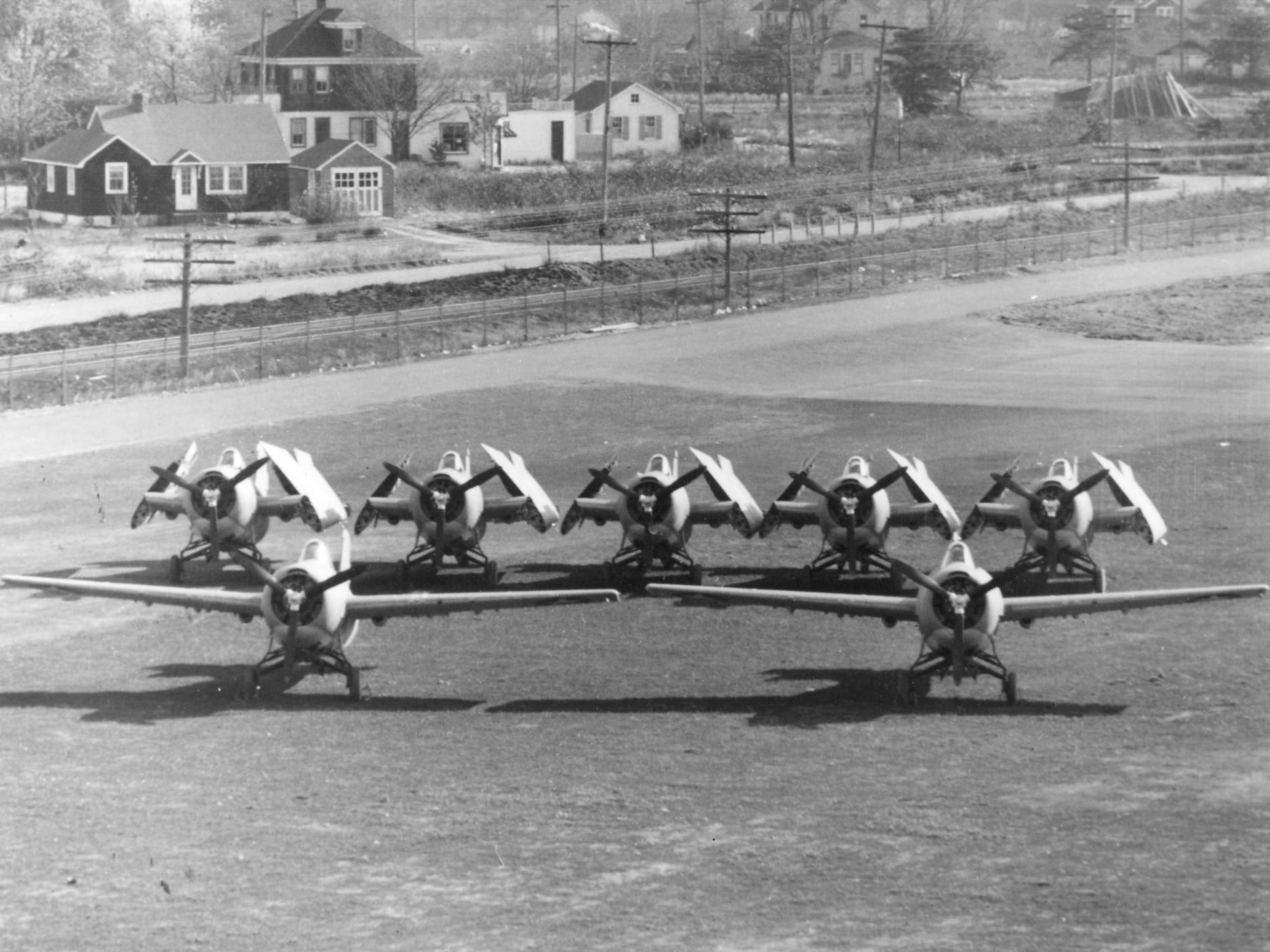
Comparison of the Grumman F4F Wildcat between folded and unfolded wings

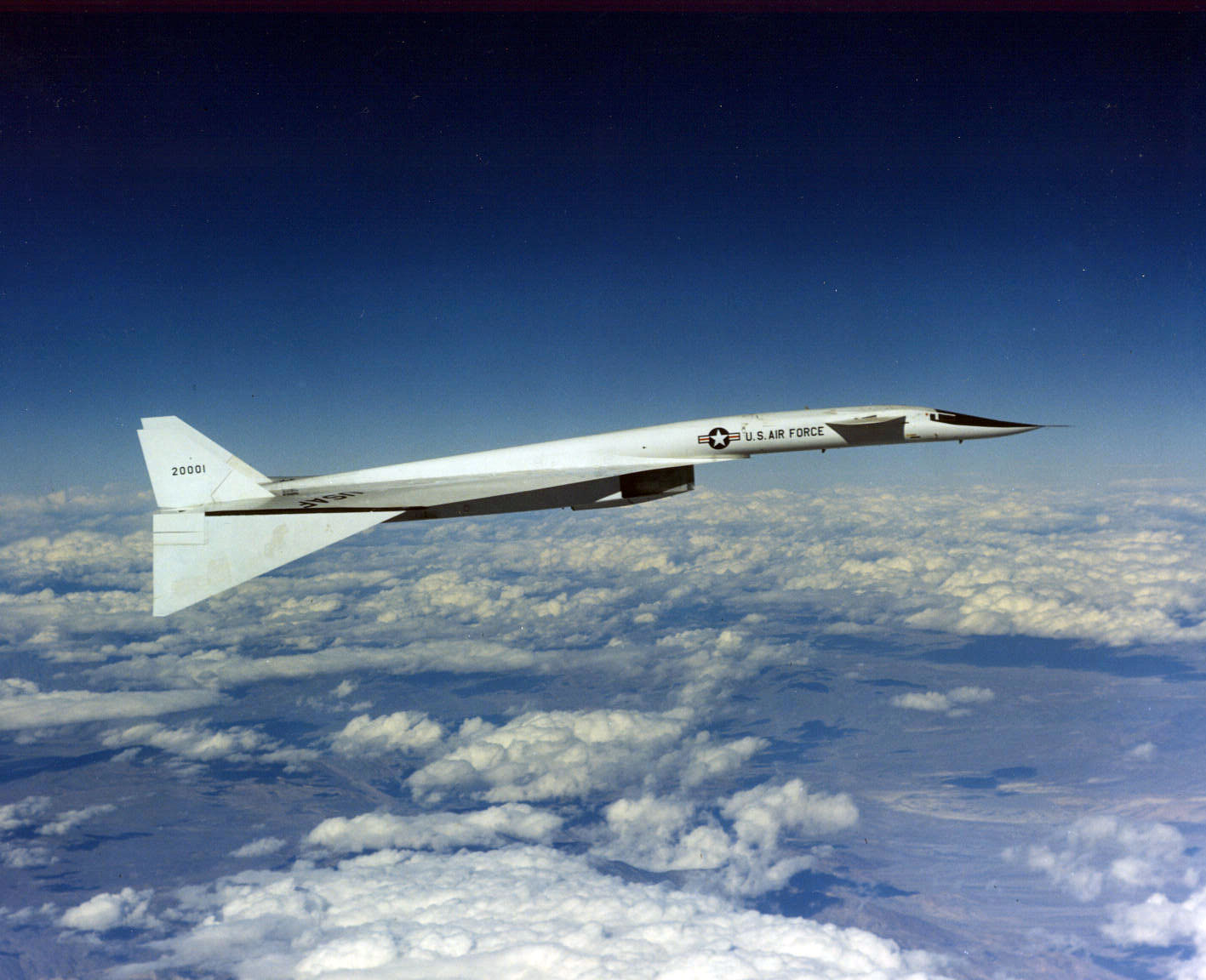
North American XB-70 in flight with 65% percent (fully folded) wing position

In the biplane era in particular a number of methods other than wing folding were used to reduce a stowed airplane's size. An early and obvious solution to reducing or reconfiguring a plane's planform was full or partial disassembly. The shipboard 2F.1 version of the Sopwith Camel fighter was designed with a removable rear fuselage, so that the front and rear sections could separated and then lifted through cargo hatches of limited size separately, for reassembly on deck. The 1915 British carrier HMS Vindex had stowage for two disassembled landplanes in a notably small hangar forward of its superstructure; the planes could be made flight-ready in 10 minutes. The first American carrier, the converted collier USS Langley, had ample storage space available, two of its former coal bunkers having been dedicated to the stowage of dismantled aircraft. Initially it had been expected that no more than 6 or 8 aircraft would operate from the ship at any given time. However, the commander of the fleet's Aircraft Squadrons (meaning, at the time, this ship, seaplane tenders, and their aircraft) at the time of Langley's commissioning, Captain Joseph M. Reeves, thought that greater things were possible, and began relentlessly drilling the ship's crew in the hope of making it possible for both the pace and scale of operations to be drastically (but safely) increased. Within a couple of years the ship's active air group had been expanded from 8 to 32 planes, with intervals between takeoffs and landings having been shortened dramatically. As part of the effort to increase the pace of operations it became standard practice to keep substantial numbers of aircraft in a less thoroughly disassembled state on the ship's open main deck (what had been the upper deck of the ship when it was a collier), with final assembly being performed on the flight deck (a superstructure supported by girders, raised above the main deck).

A few other methods for reducing an aircraft's size for stowage should be mentioned here. Many helicopters have rotor blades that can be aligned over the fuselage to save space onboard ships. Another Grumman naval aircraft, the F-14 Tomcat, had variable-sweep wings that could be swept between 20° and 68° in flight. For parking, the wings could be "overswept" to 75°, narrowing (somewhat) the distance from wingtip to wingtip when parked. On the Bell-Boeing V-22 Osprey the wing itself can be pivoted 90 degrees as a single unit, to lie directly over the fuselage, while the blades on the massive propellers can be individually swung around so that they, too, are oriented parallel to the fuselage, like the rotor blades on a helicopter.

== Gallery ==
=== Short-type fold ===
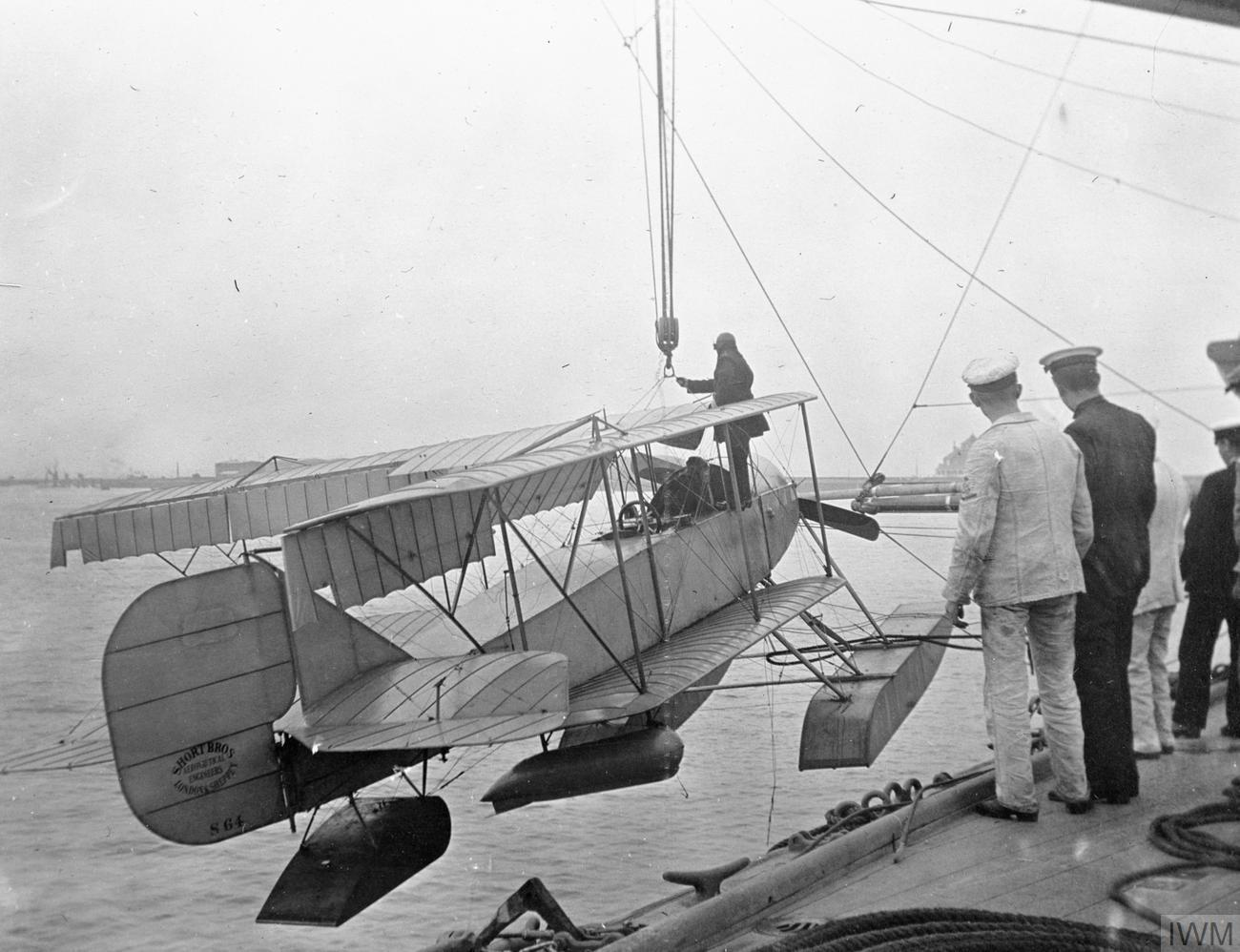
Short Folder S.64 being hoisted aboard the cruiser HMS Hermes

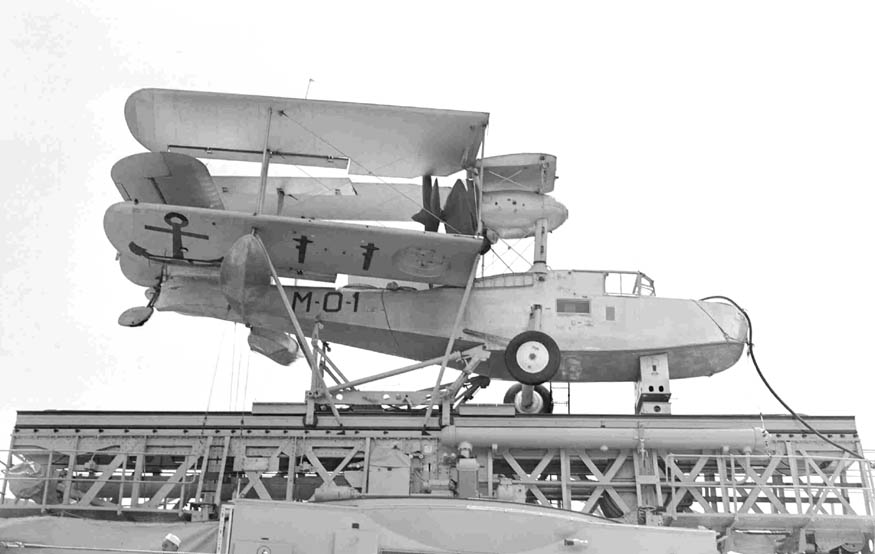
Argentinian Supermarine Walrus on a cruiser.

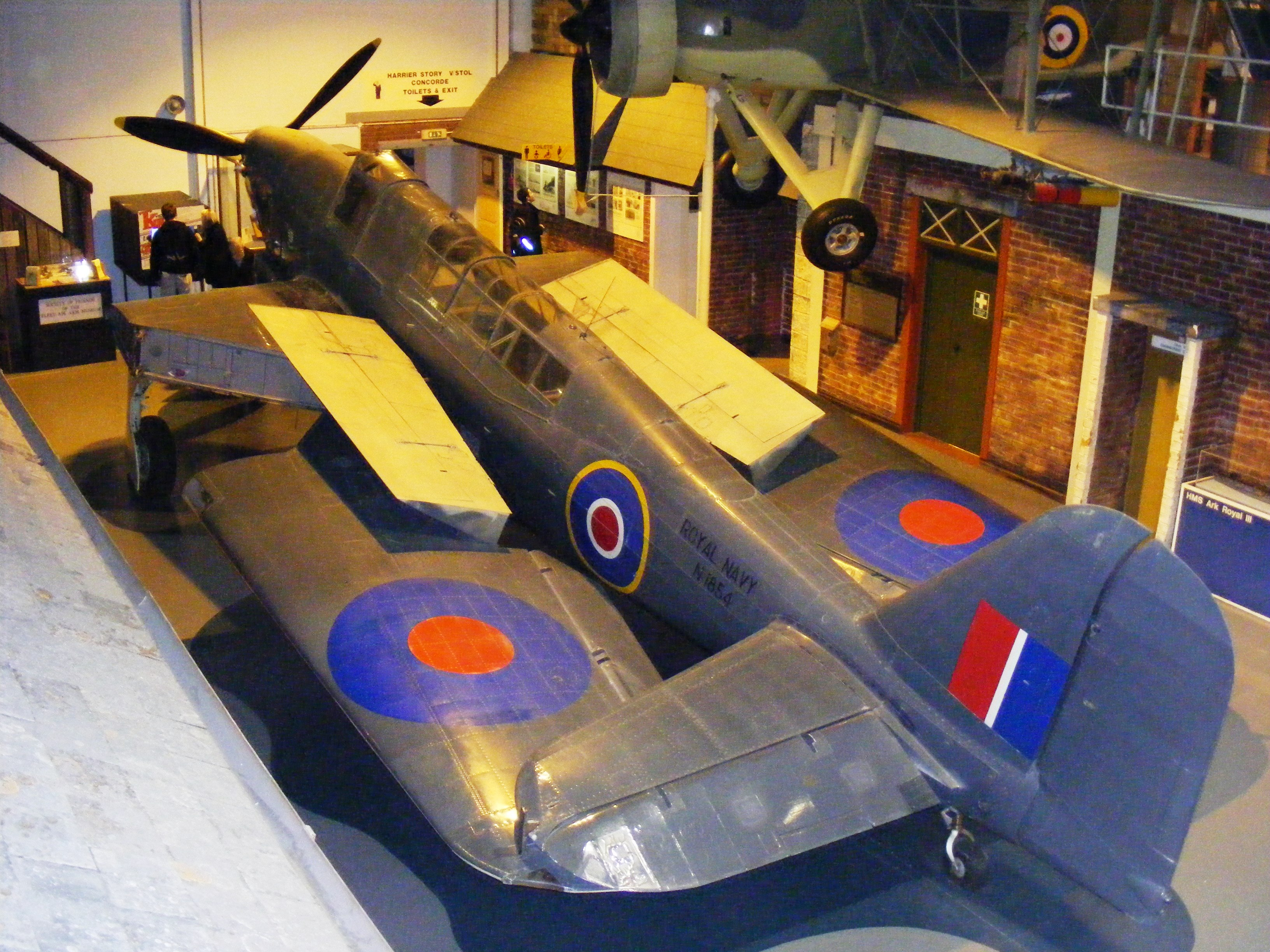
Fairey Fulmar

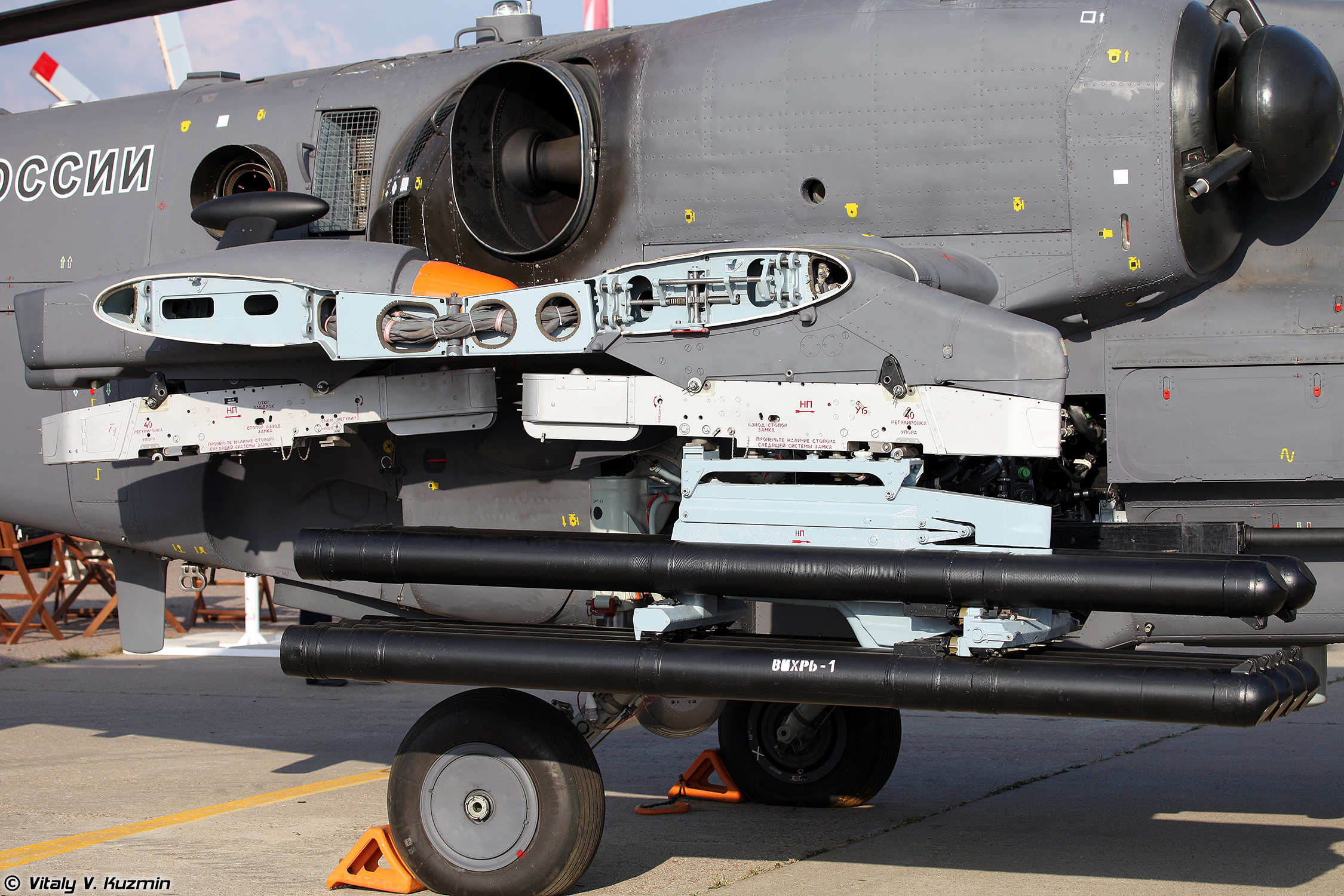
Kamov Ka-52K stub wings

=== Grumman-type fold ===
Breguet Type III, with wings folded (c. 1912)

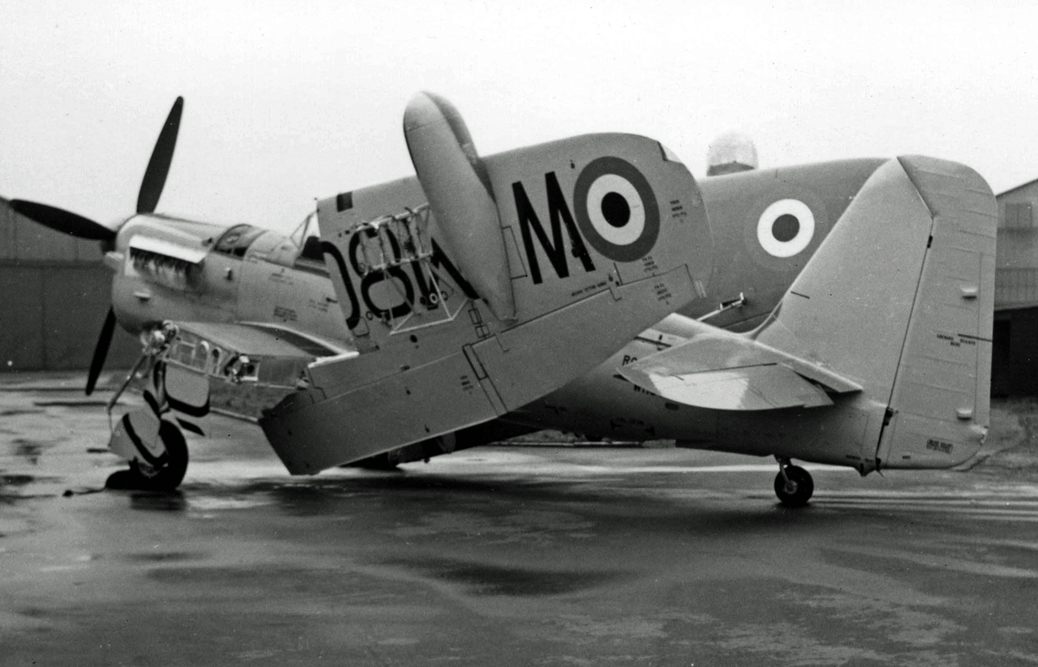
Fairey Firefly

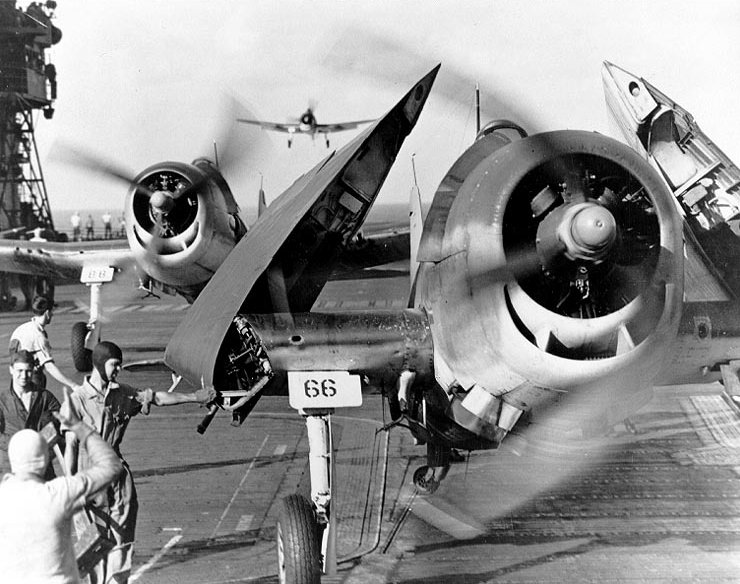
Grumman F6F Hellcats of the US Navy used the patented Sto-Wing system, common to Grumman fighters of World War II.

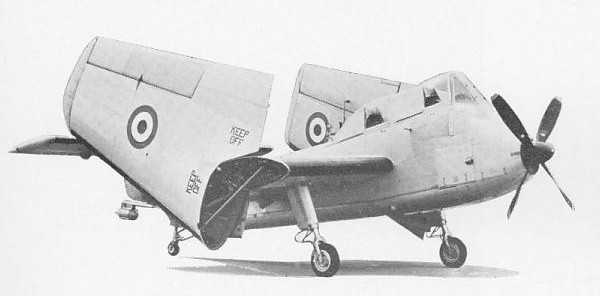
Short Seamew

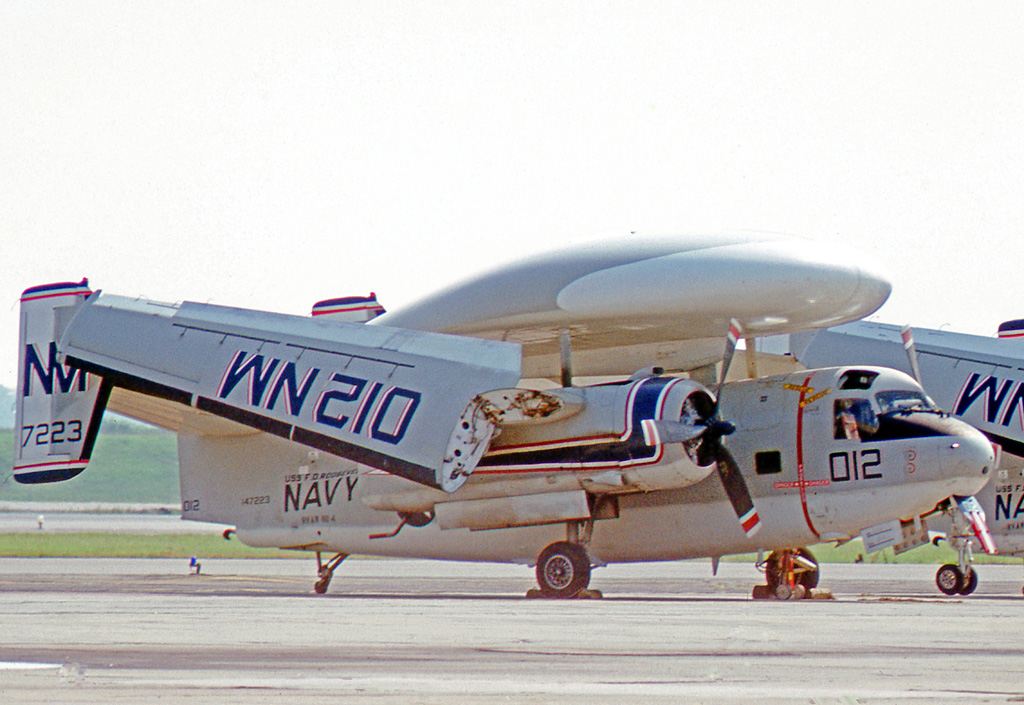
Grumman E-1 Tracer with Sto-Wing folded wings

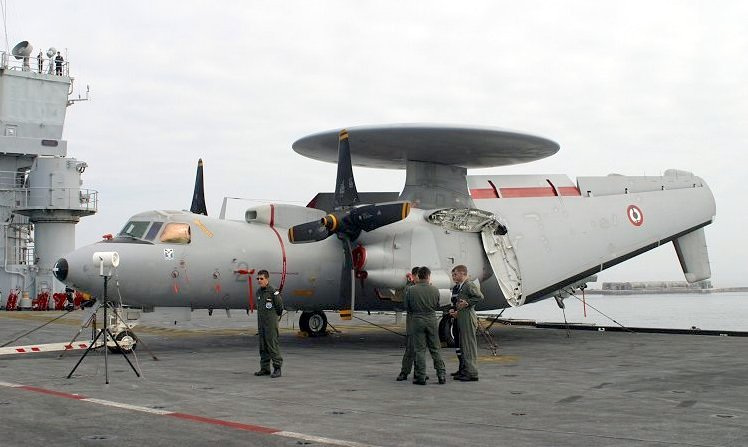
Grumman E-2 Hawkeye, which still uses a form of Grumman's Sto-Wing design

=== Simple overhead fold ===
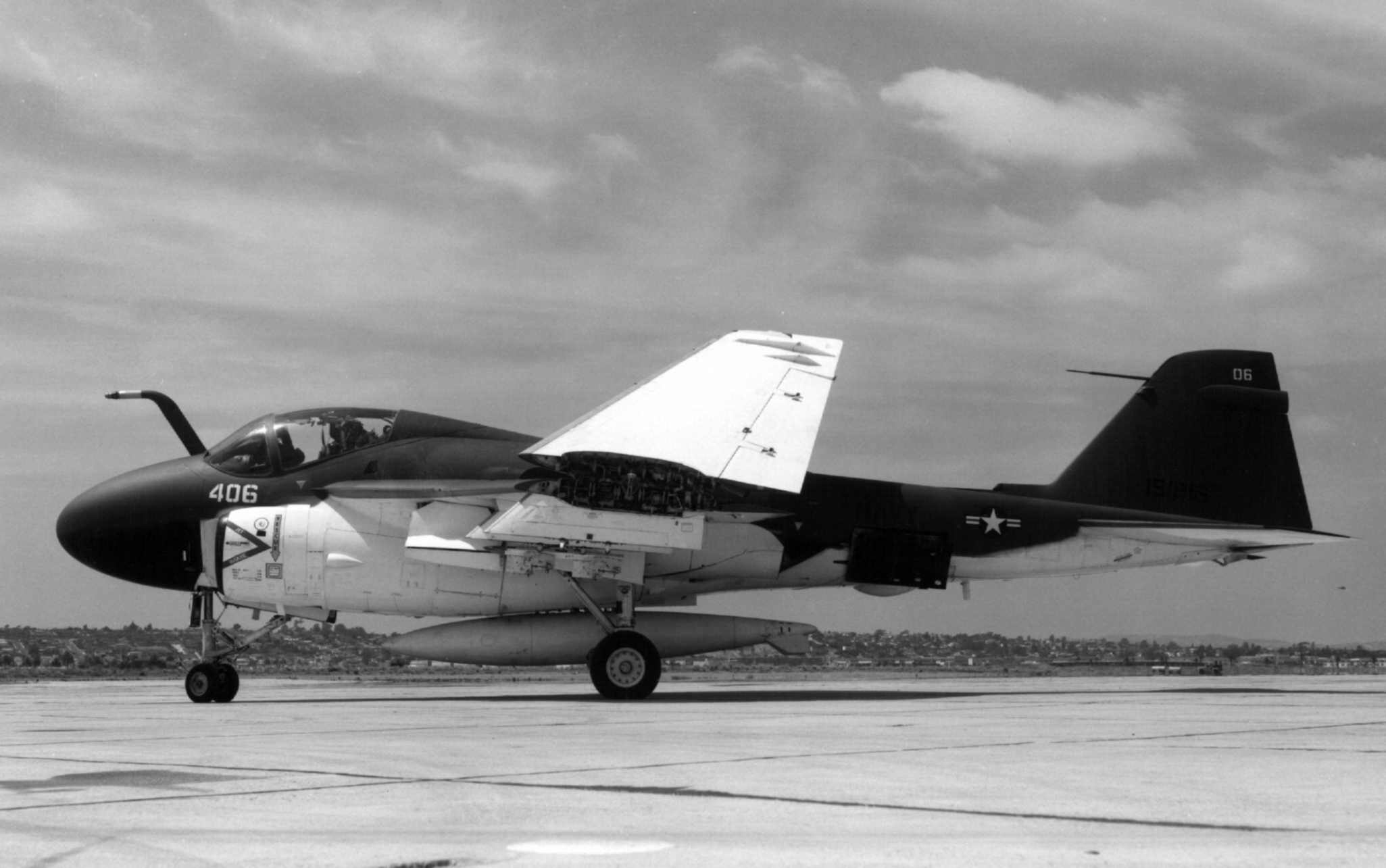
Grumman A-6A Intruder

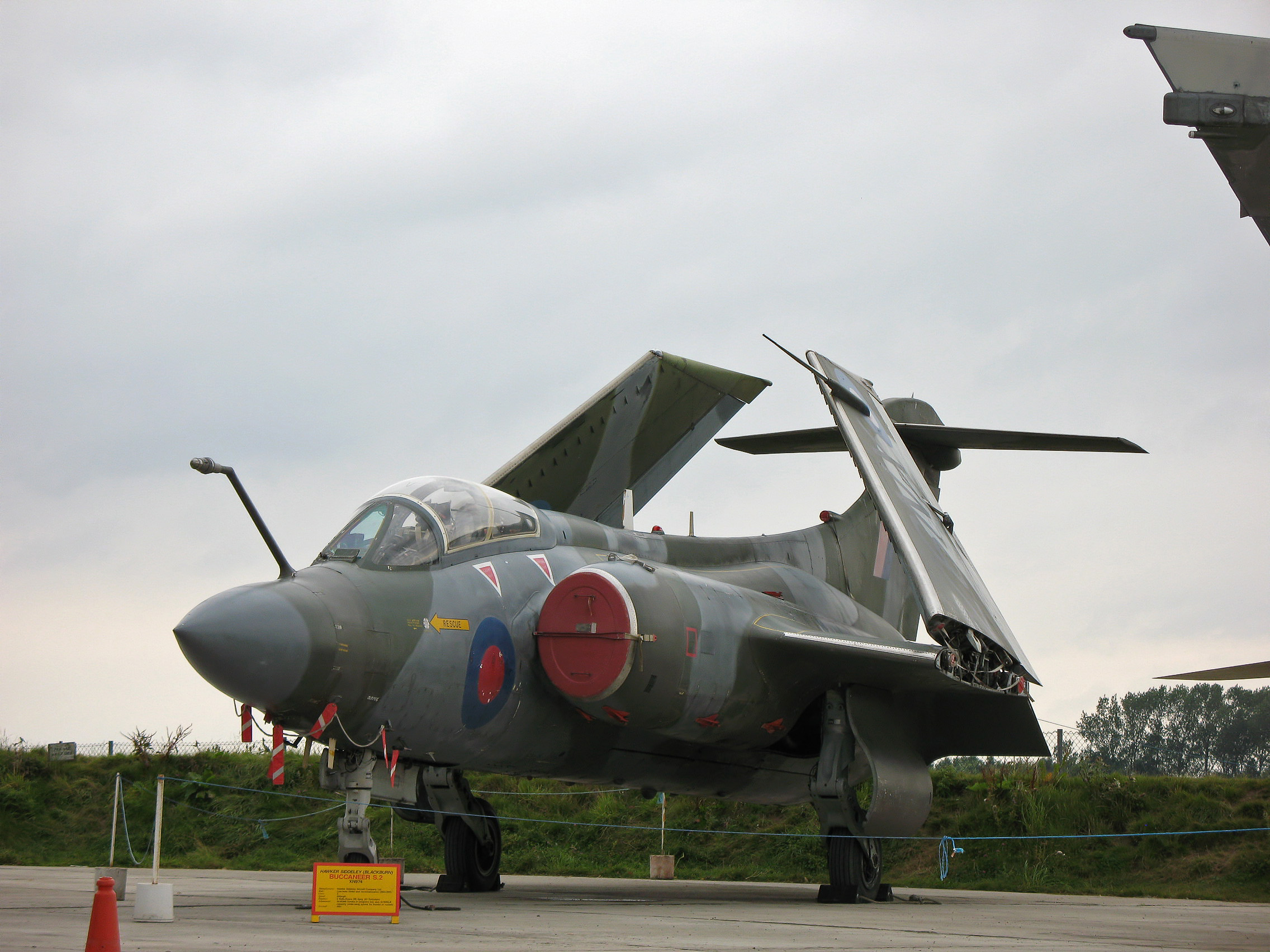
RAF Buccaneer S.2

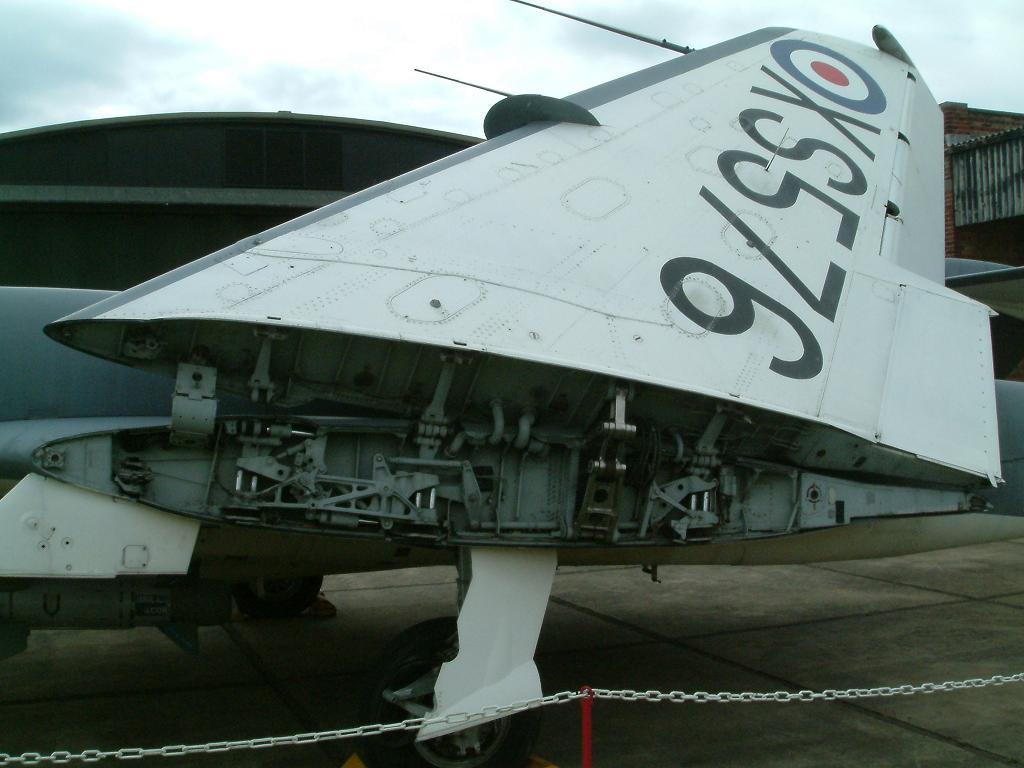
De Havilland Sea Vixen

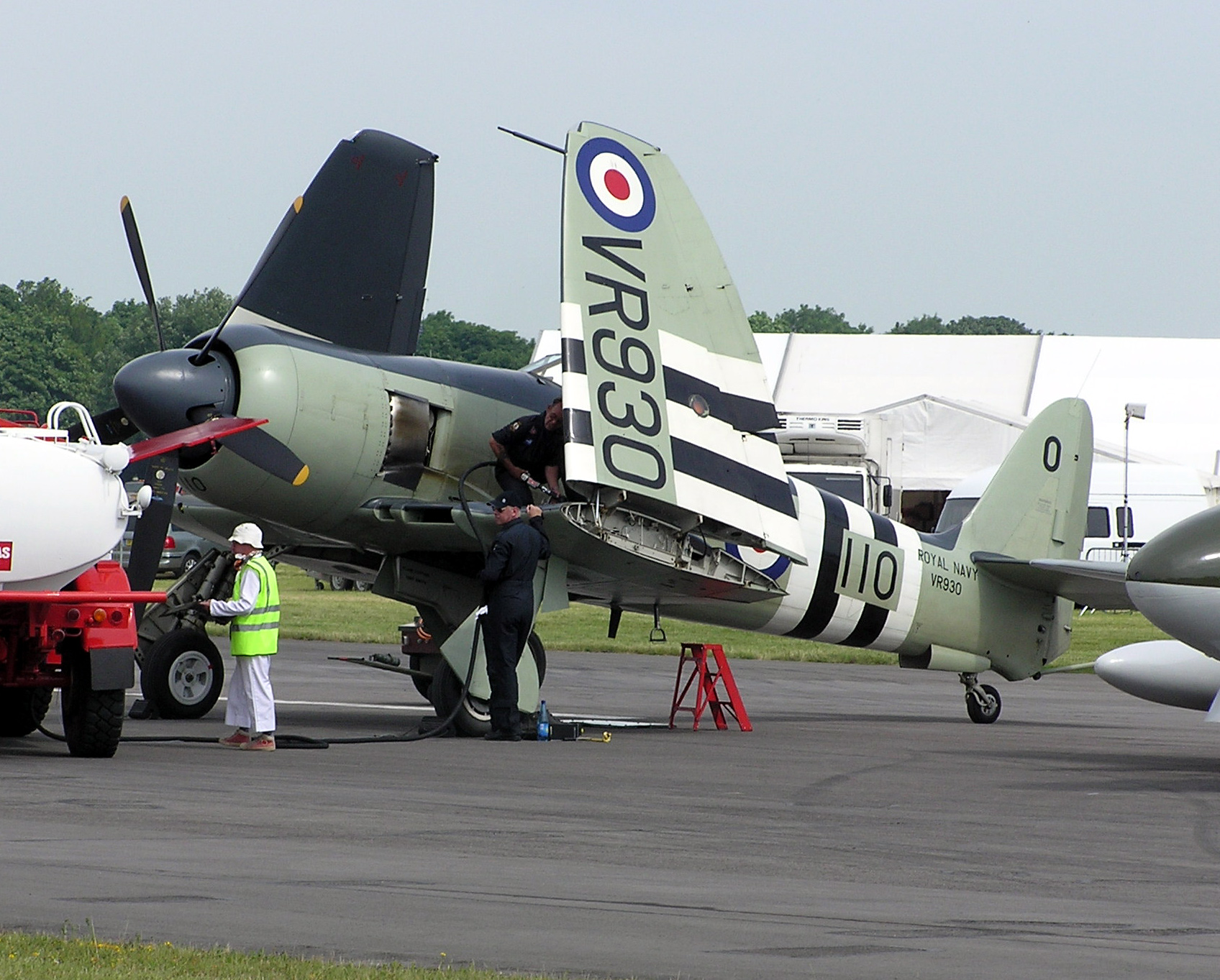
Hawker Sea Fury

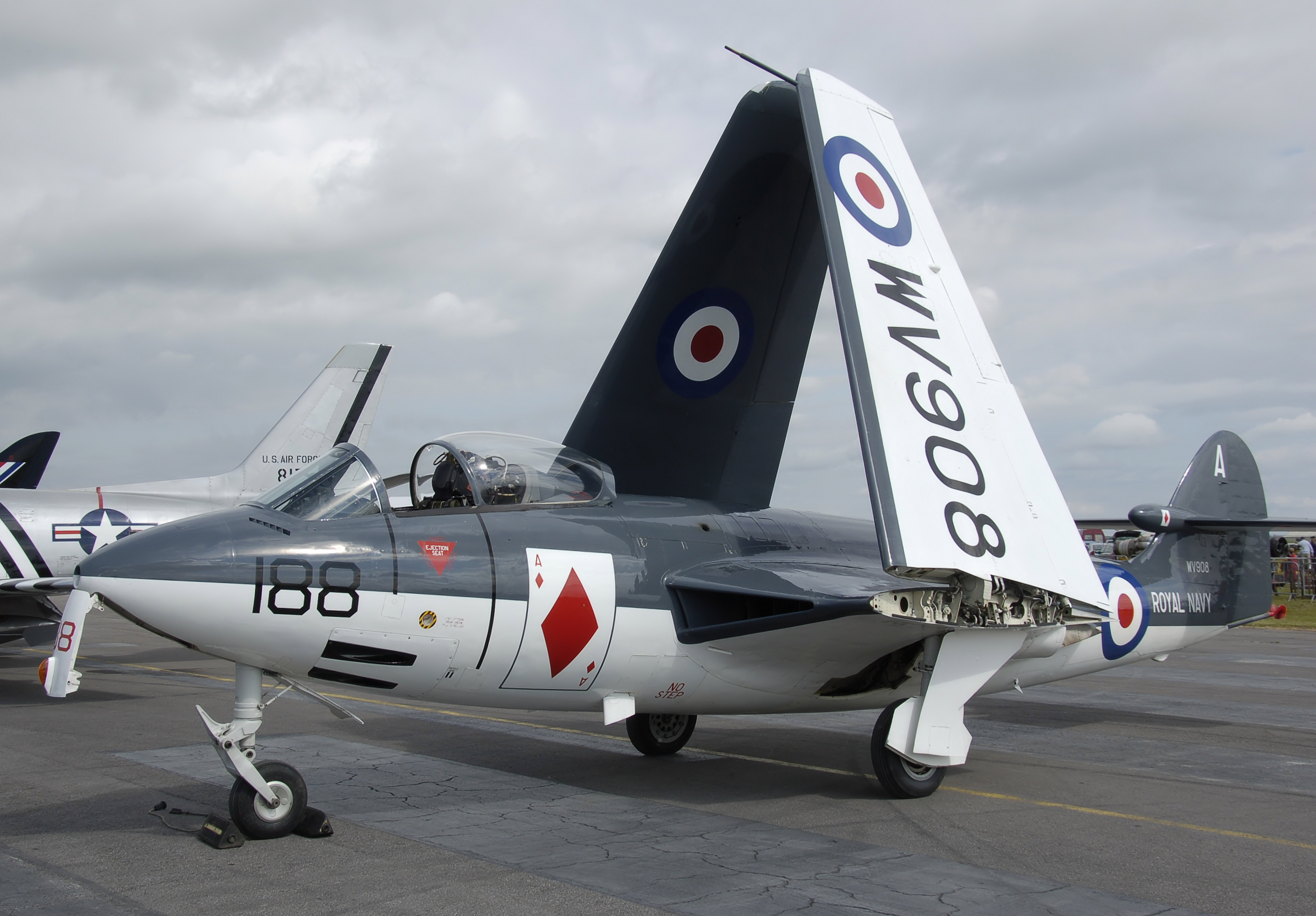
Hawker Sea Hawk FGA.6

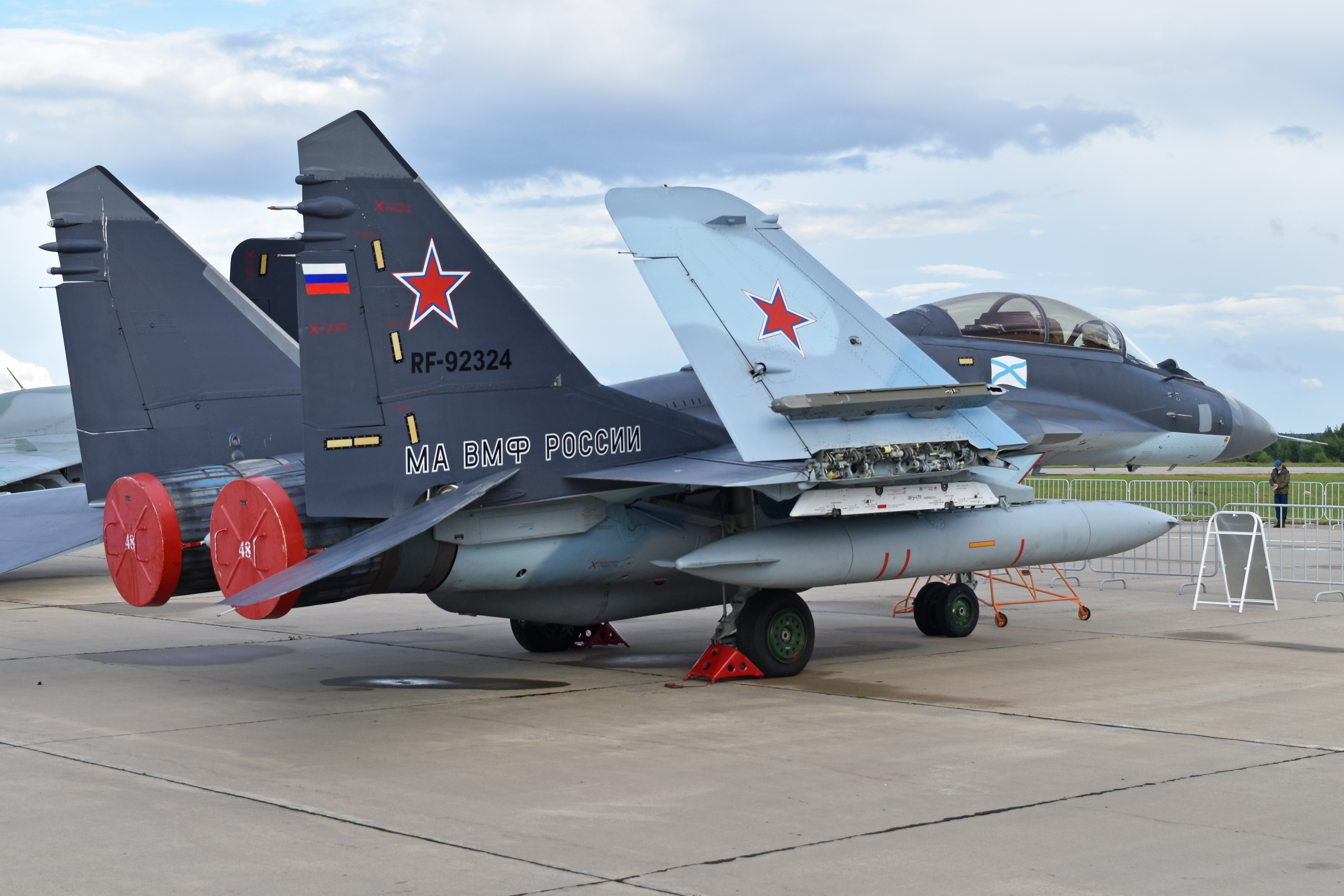
MiG-29K at ARMY 2017

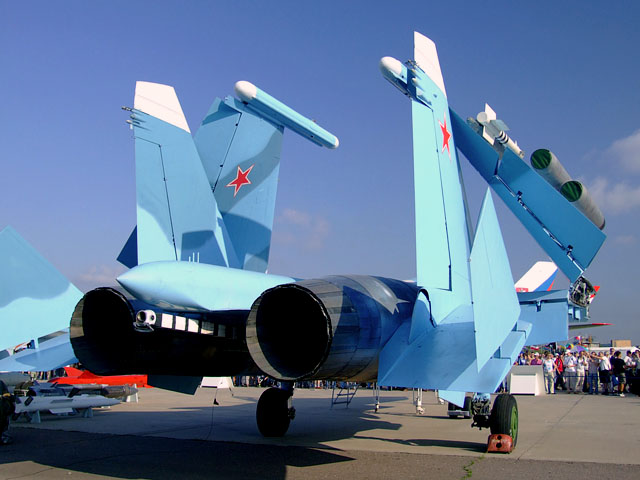
Sukhoi Su-33 at MAKS 2007

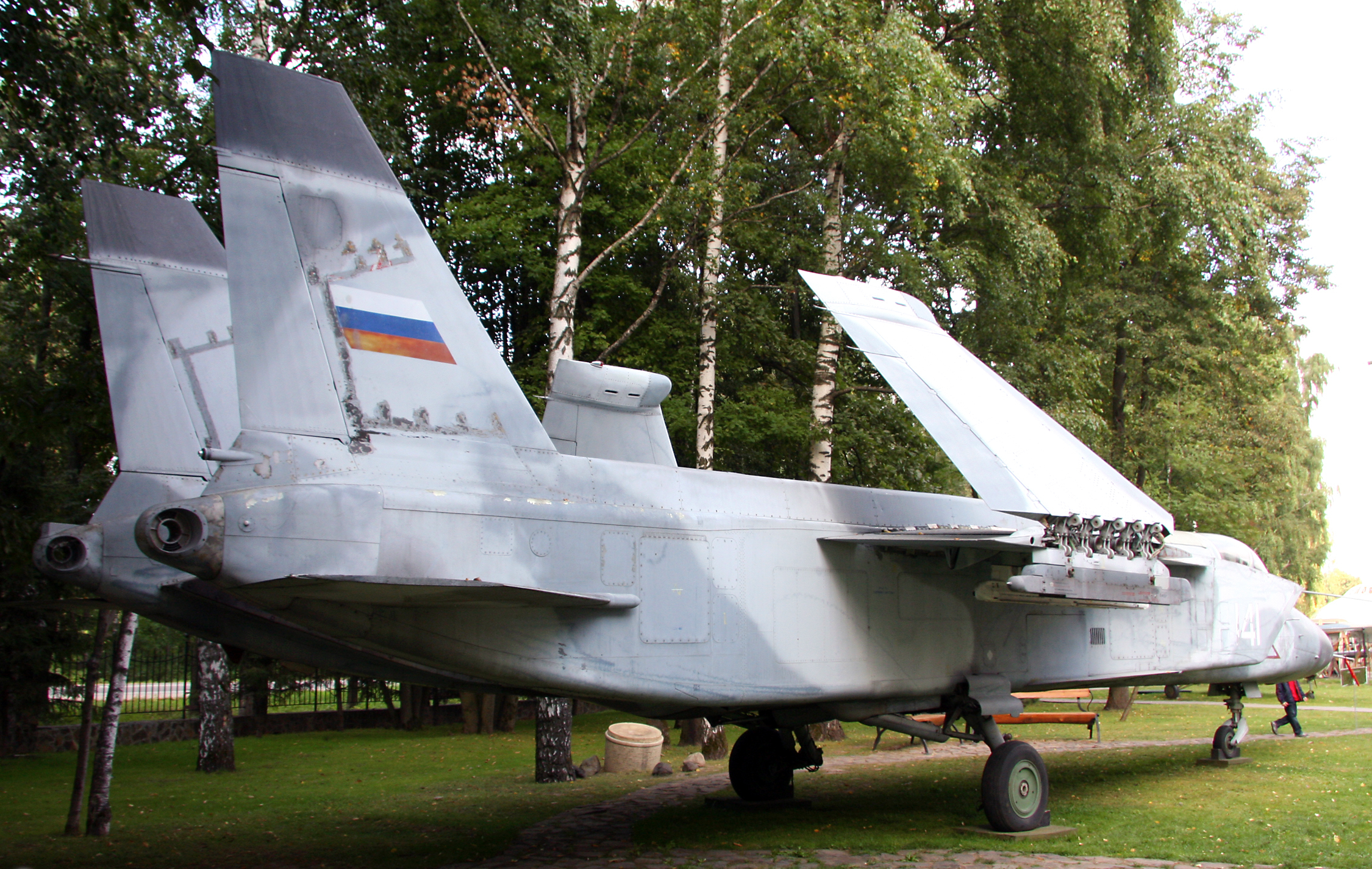
Yakovlev Yak-141

=== Double fold ===
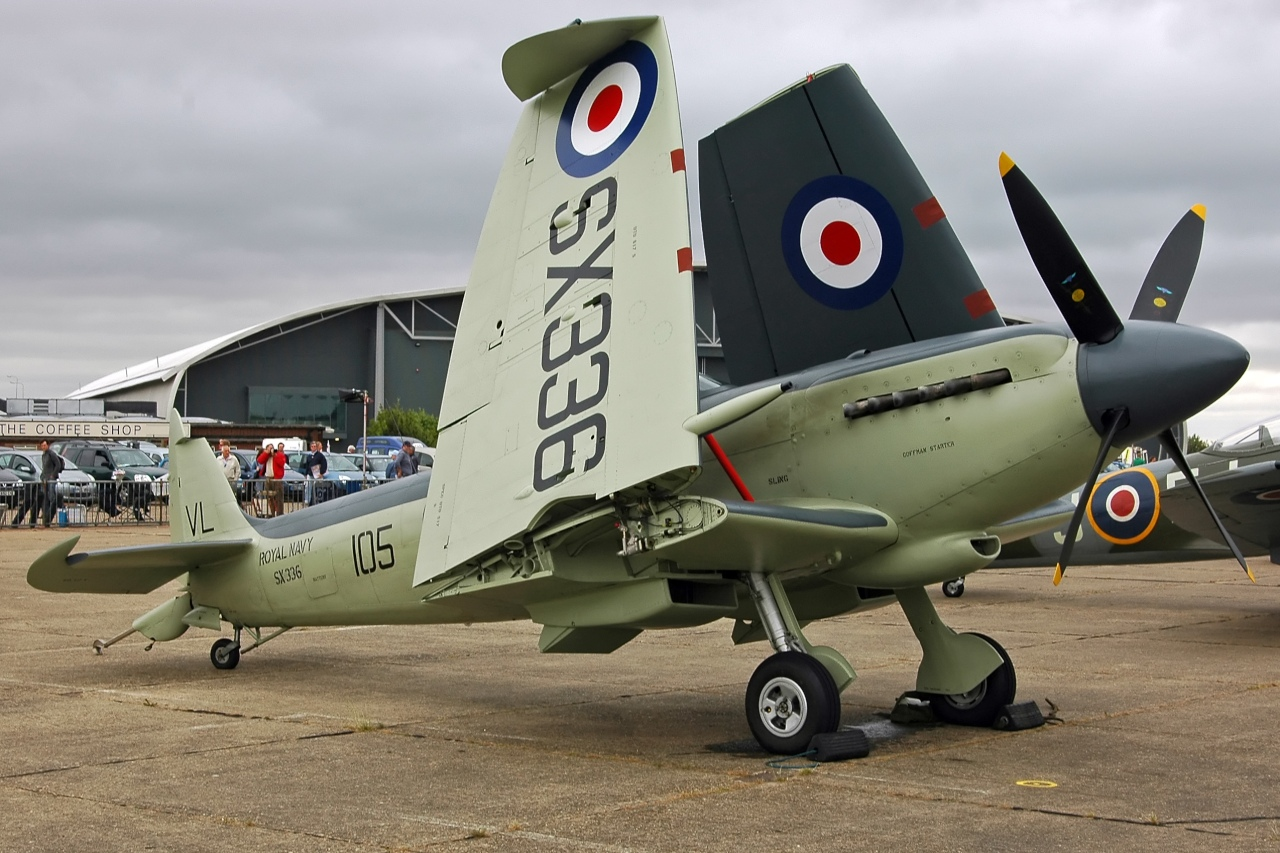
Supermarine Seafire

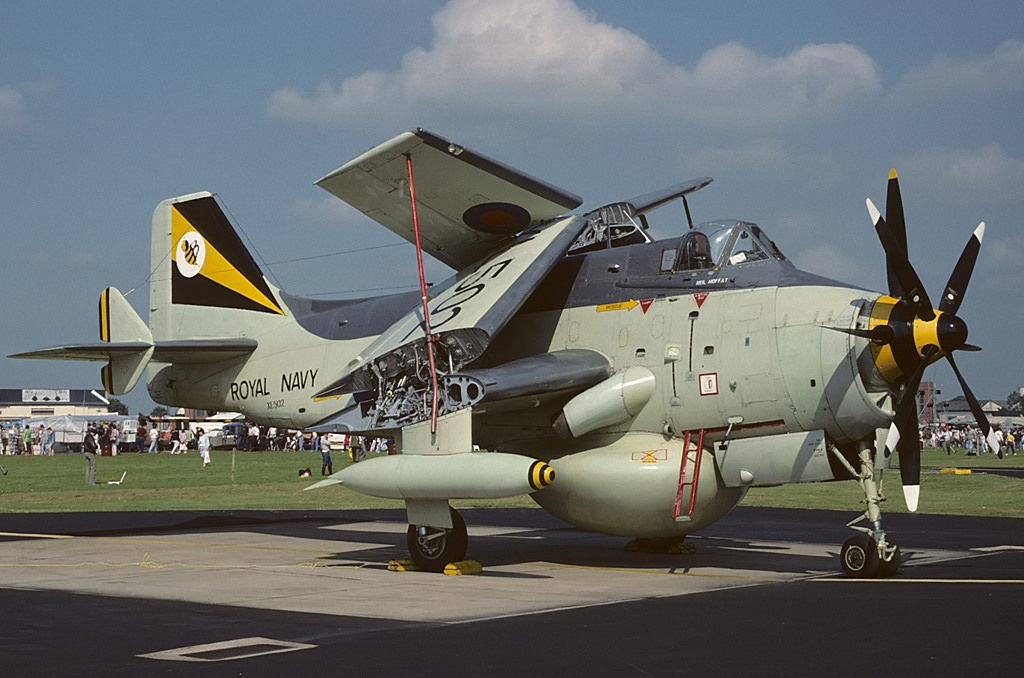
Fairey Gannet

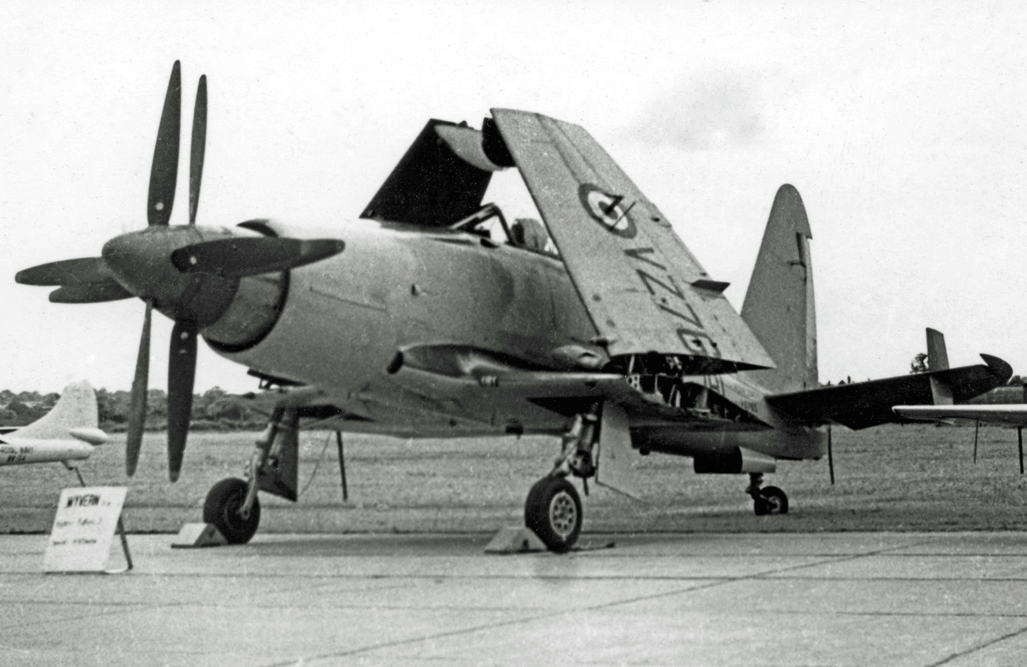
Westland Wyvern

=== Asymmetric folding ===
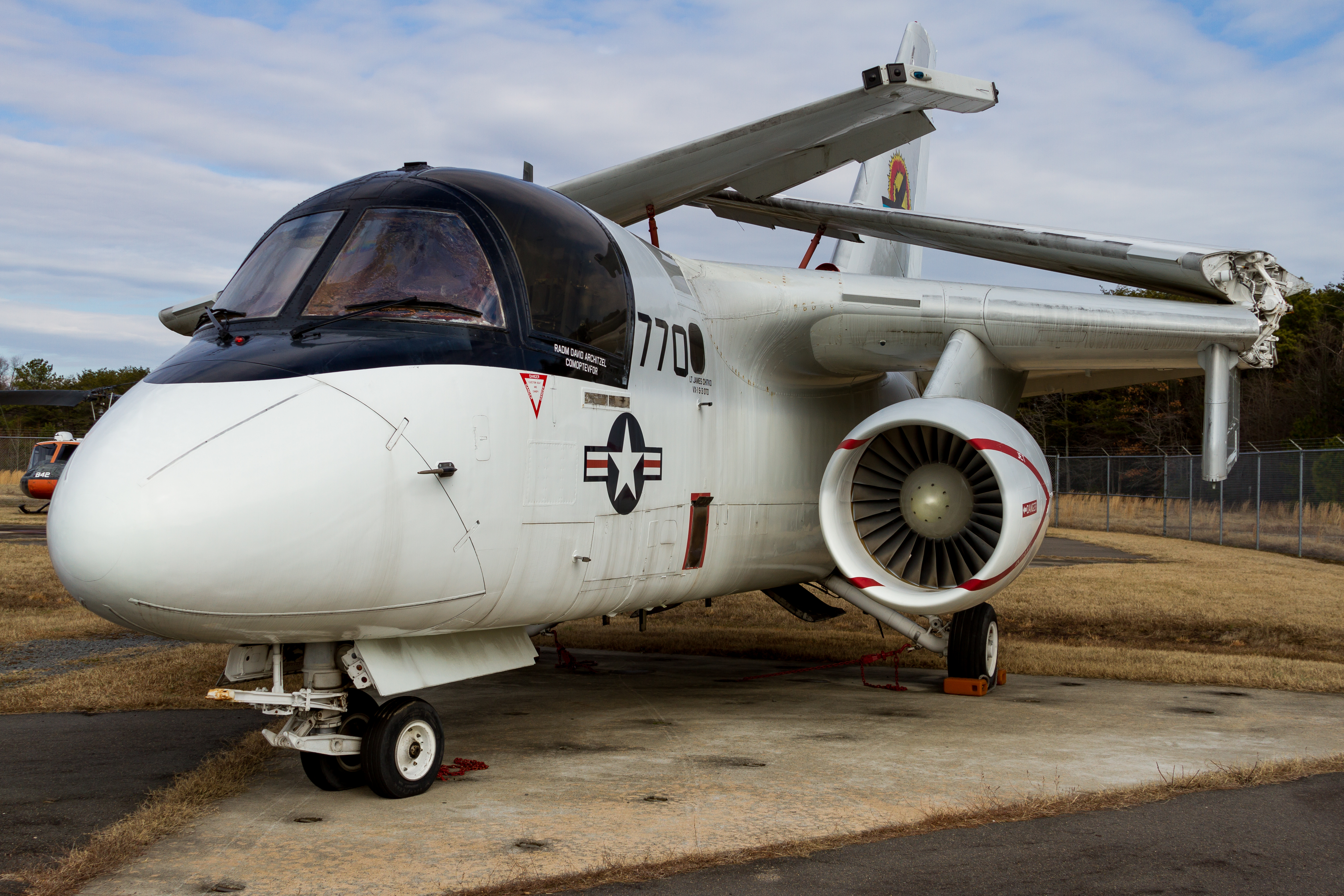
Lockheed S-3 Viking--note asymmetric wing fold

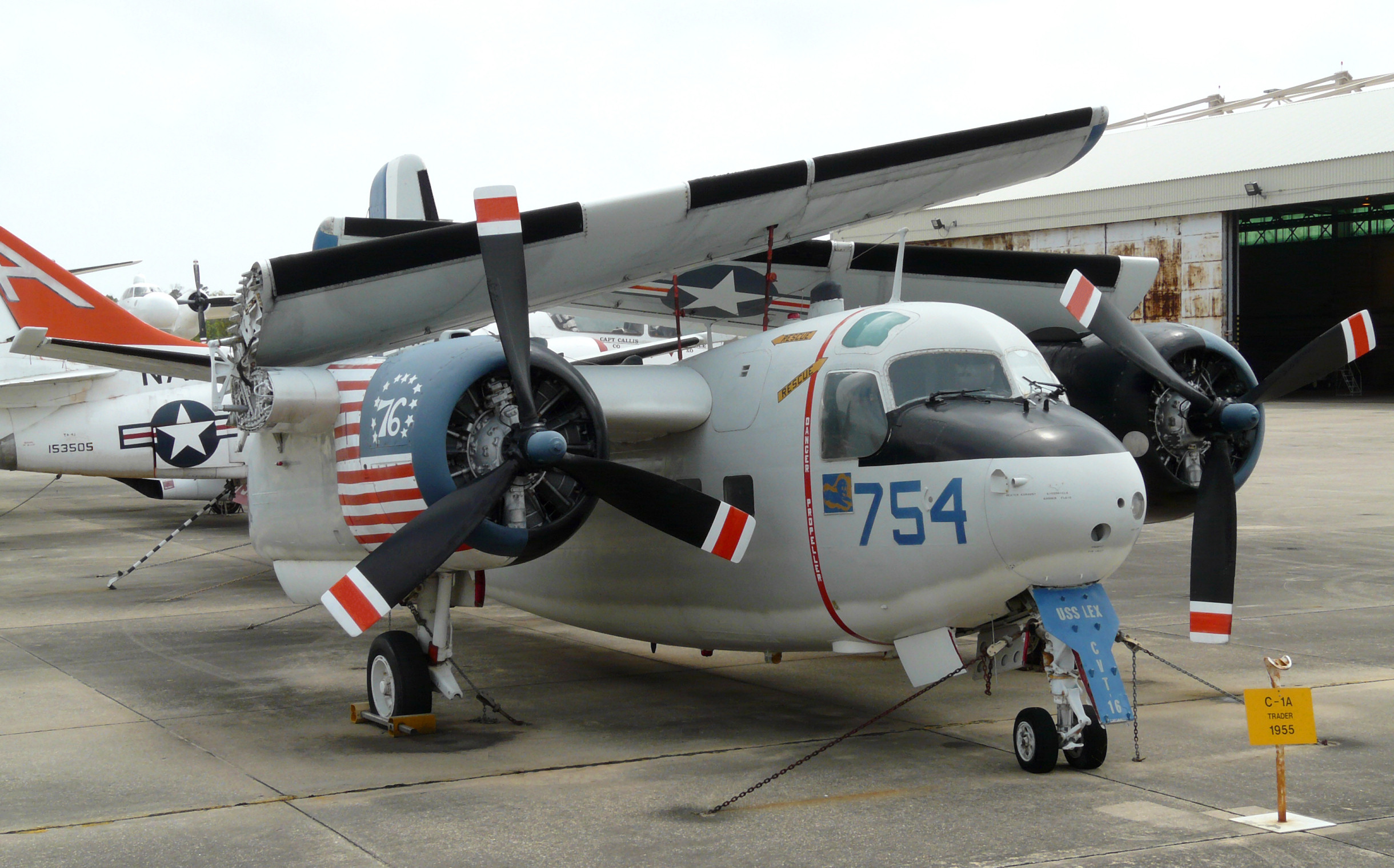
Grumman C-1A Trader

=== Minimally folding wingtip ===
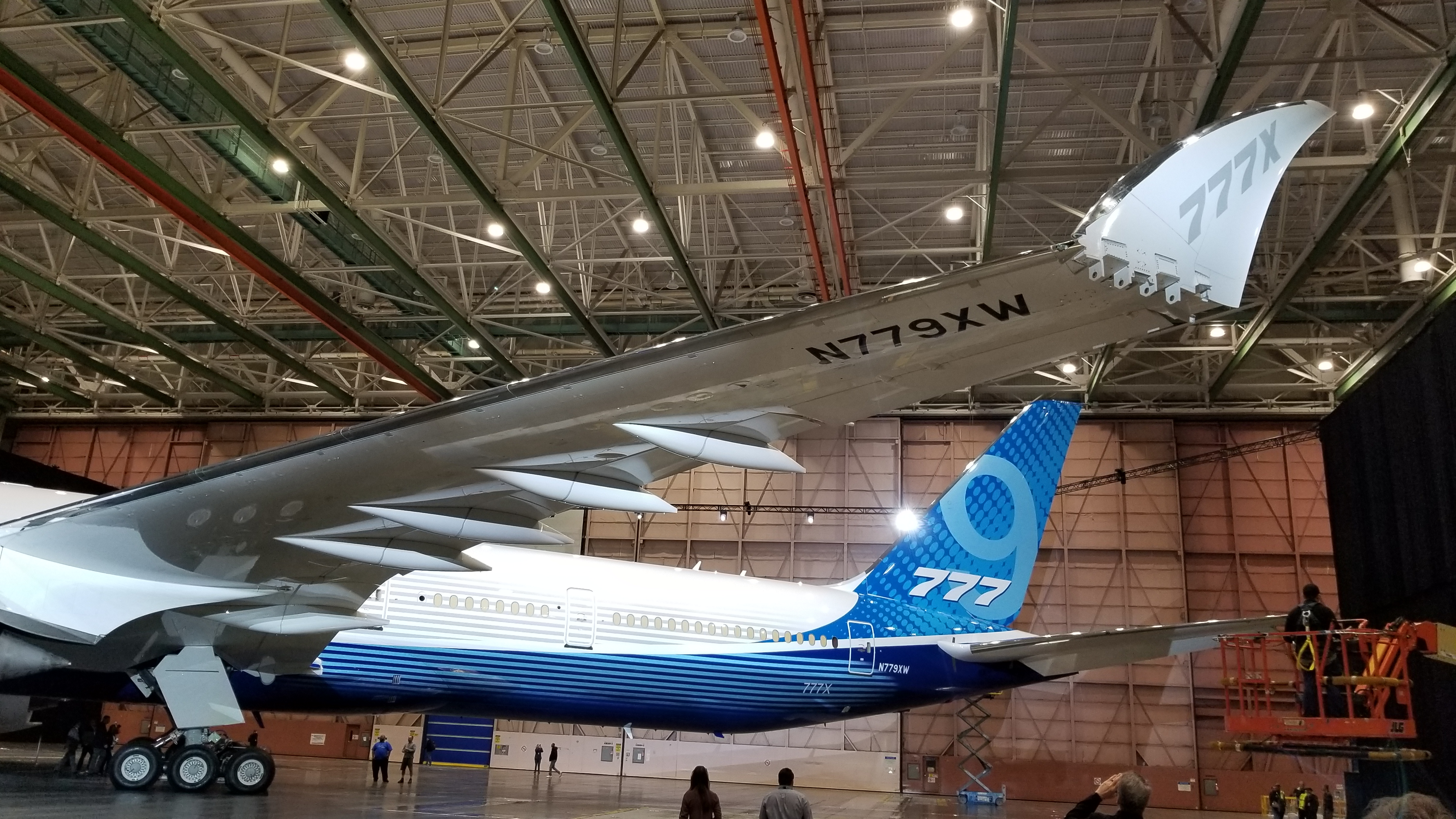
The folding wingtip of a Boeing 777X

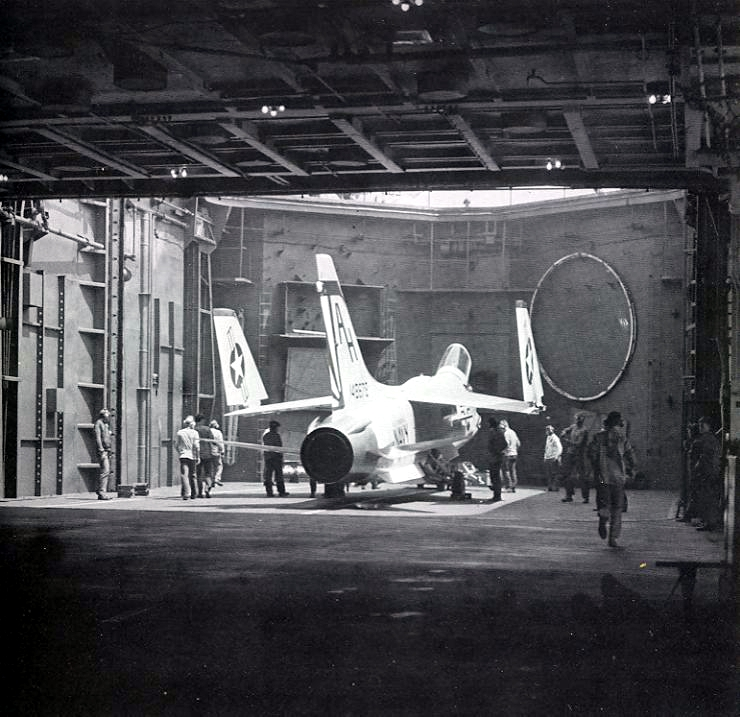
F-8H in an elevator

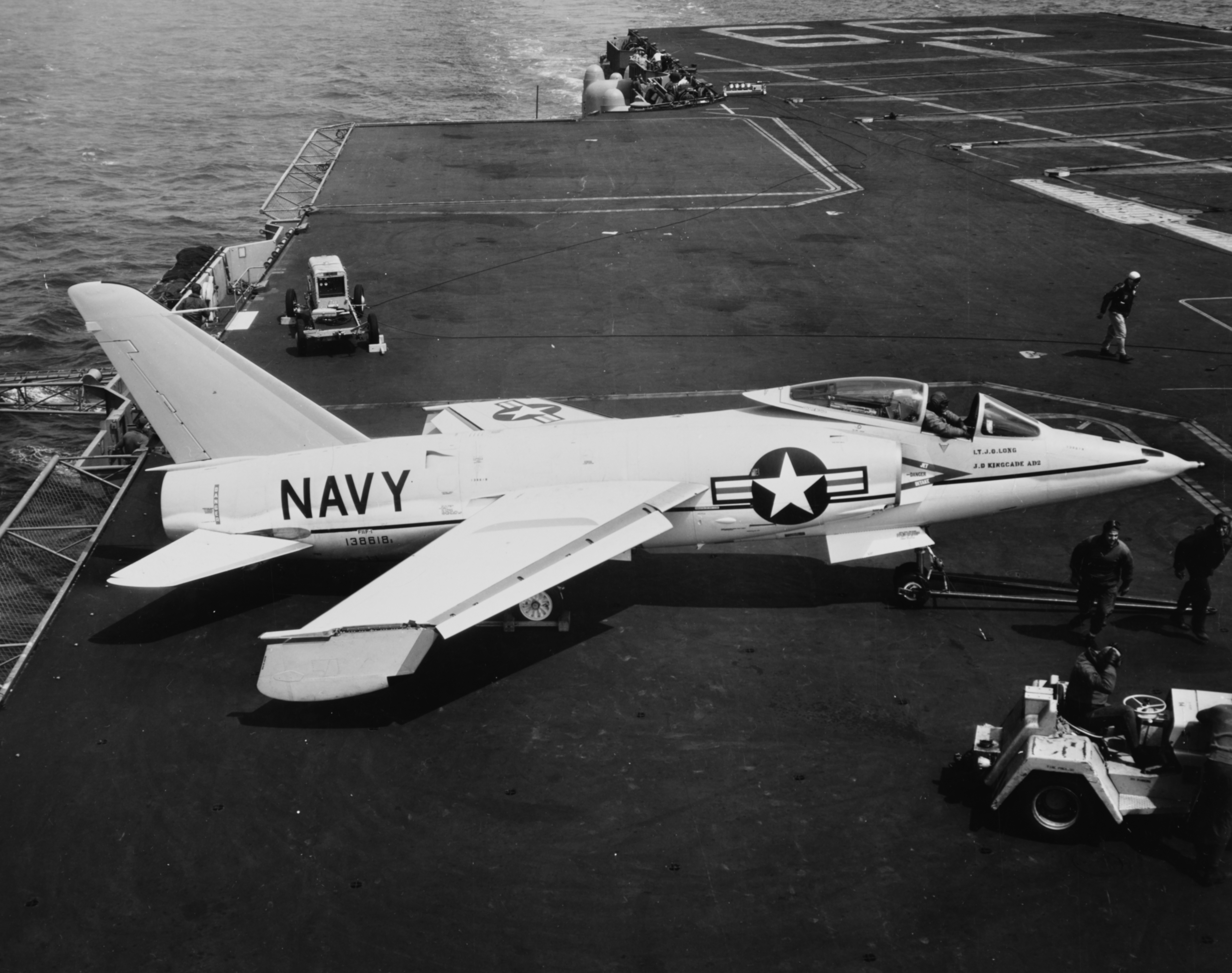
An F11F Tiger with downward-folded wingtips

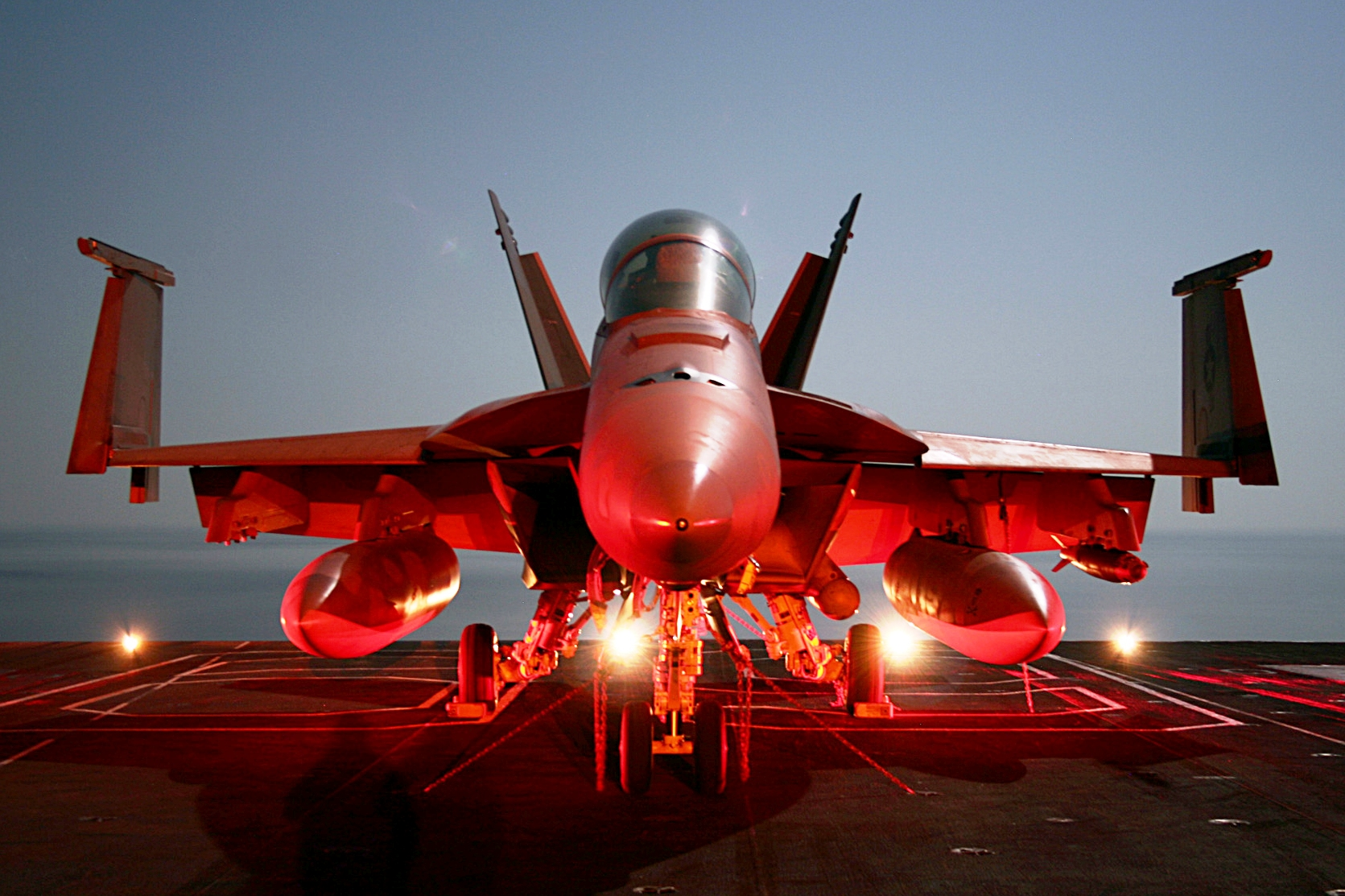
F/A-18E/F Super Hornet

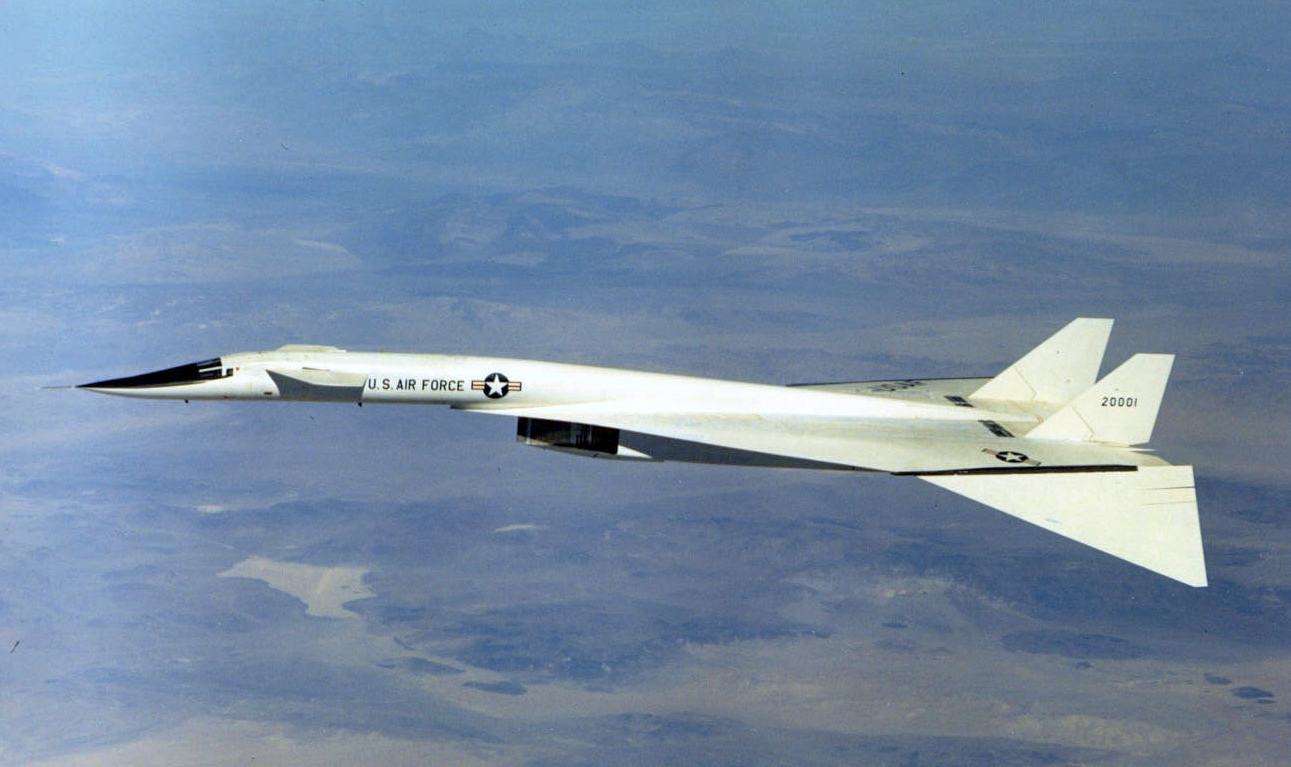
North American XB-70 Valkyrie

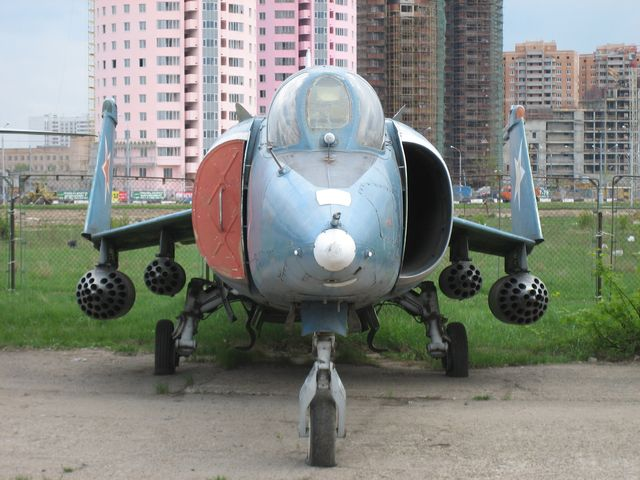
Yakovlev Yak-38

=== Folding rotor ===
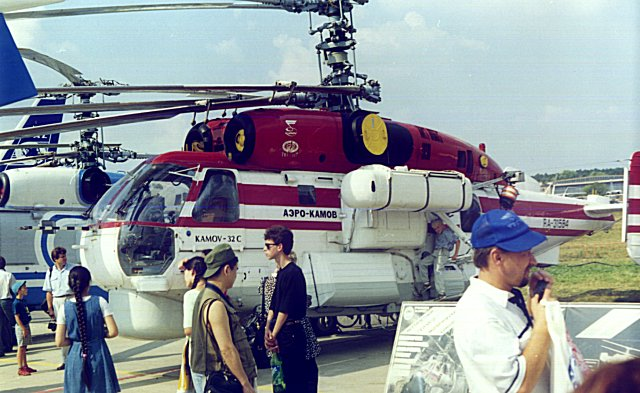
Ka-32S at MAKS 1997

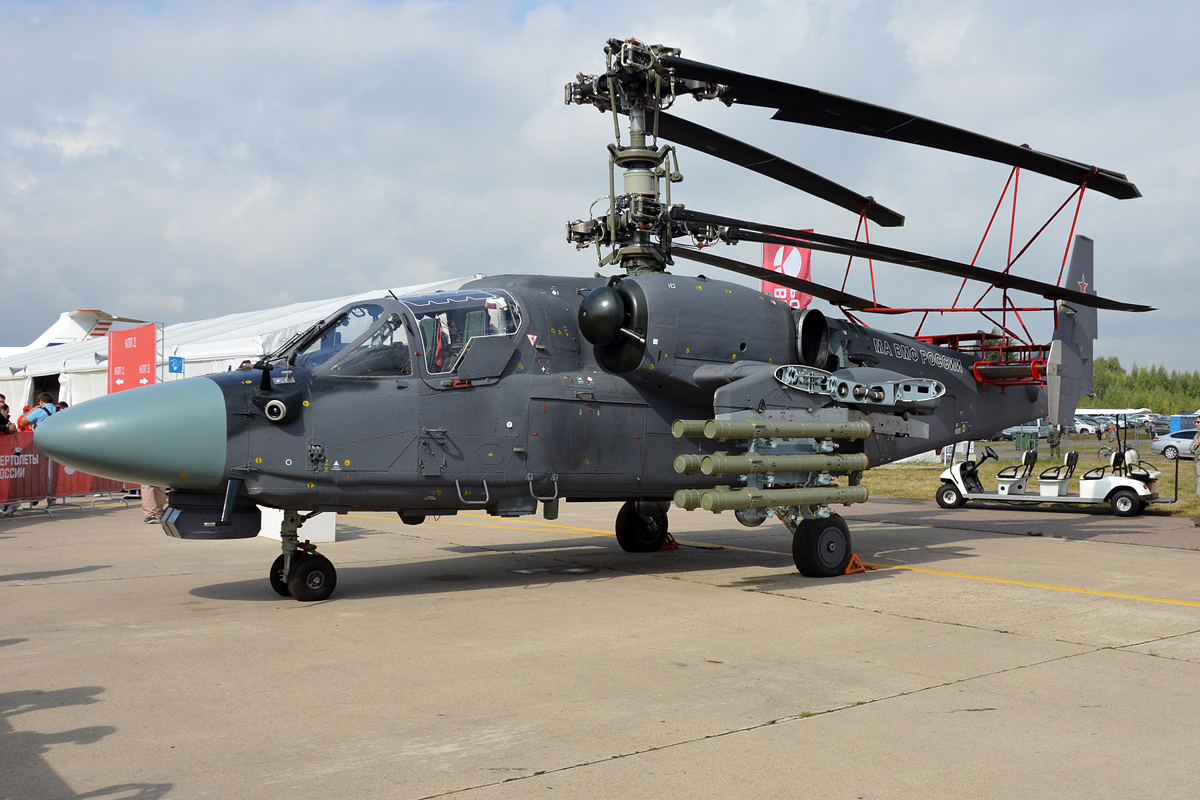
Kamov Ka-52K

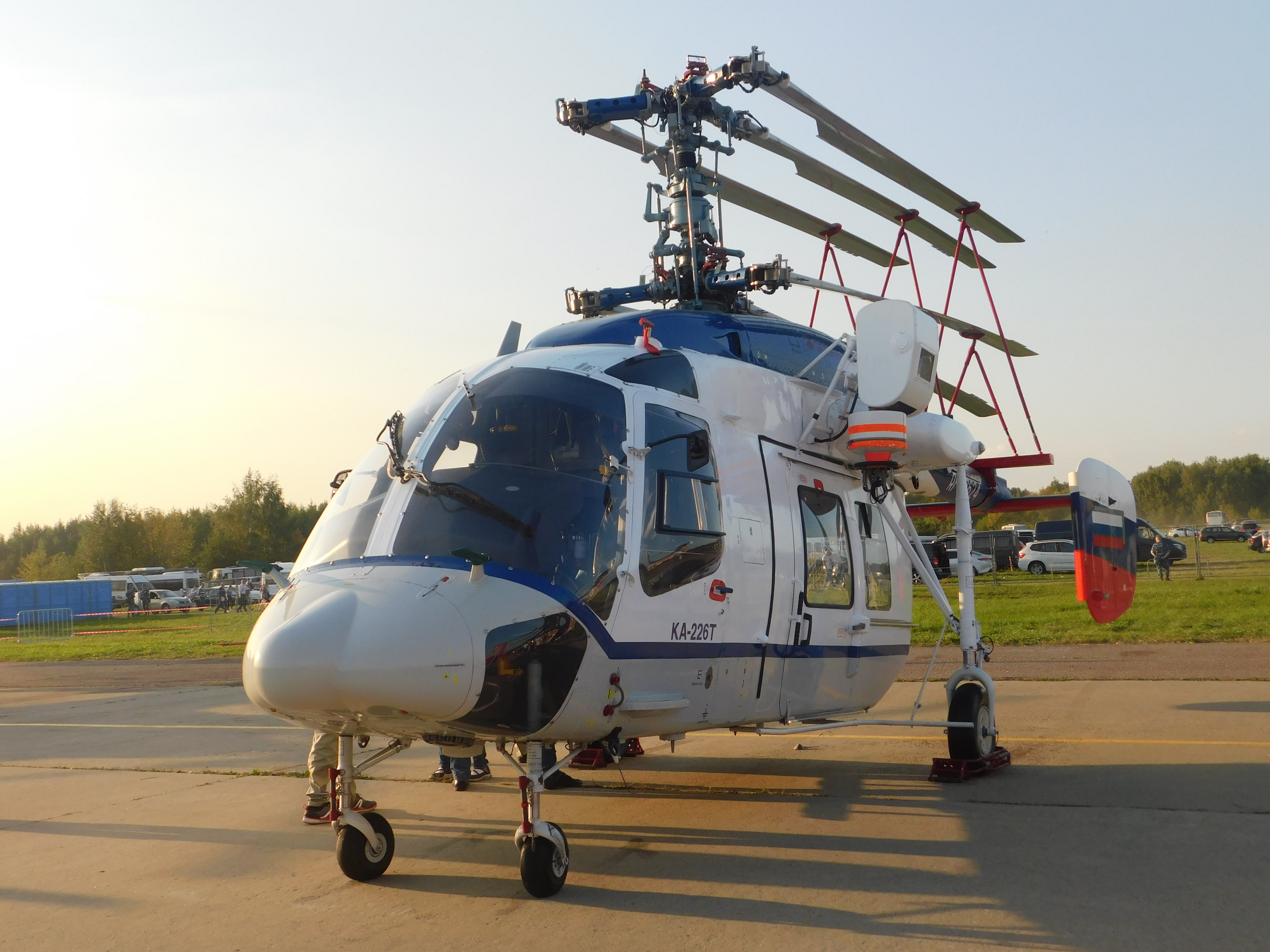
Kamov Ka-226

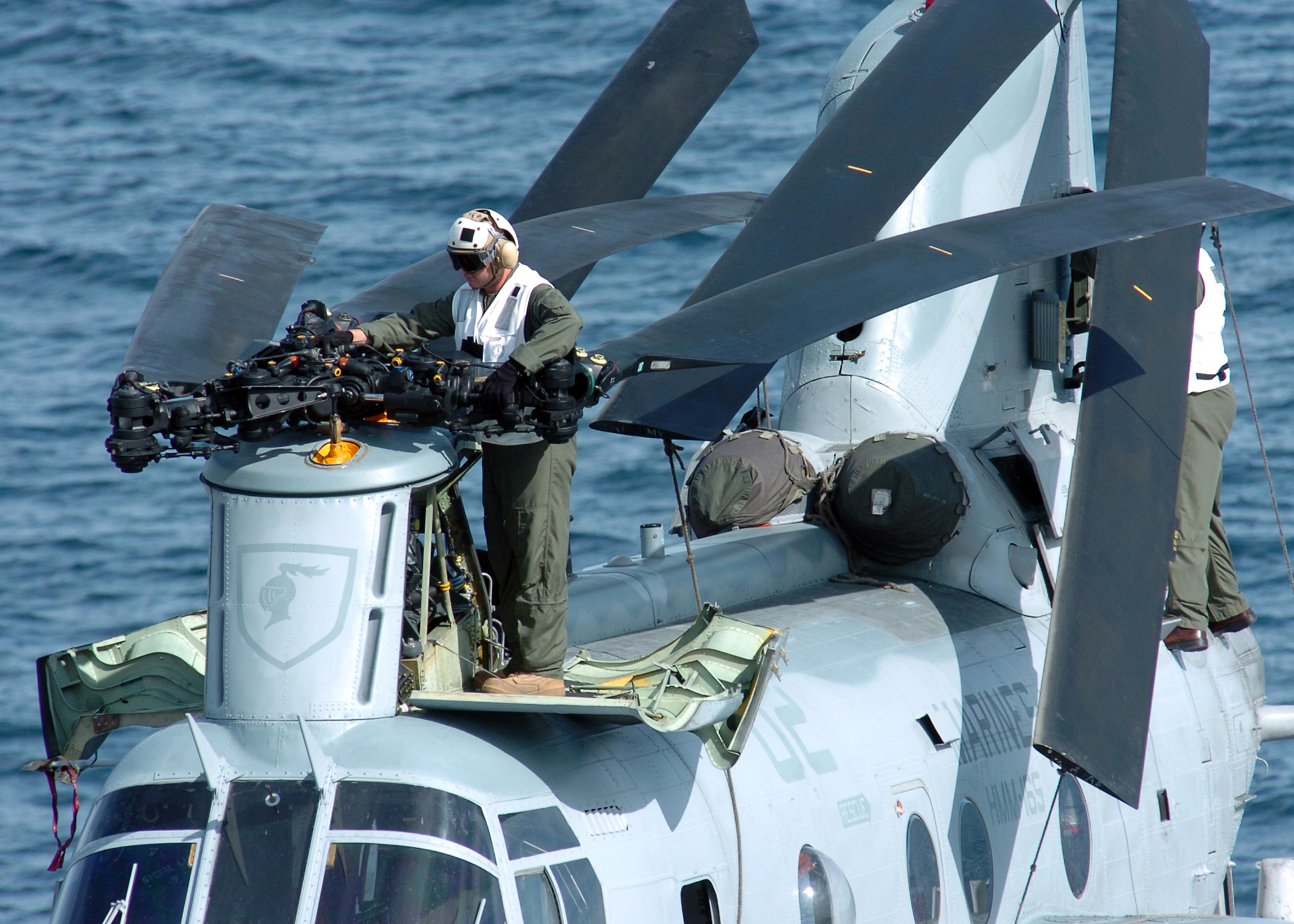
CH-46 Sea Knight

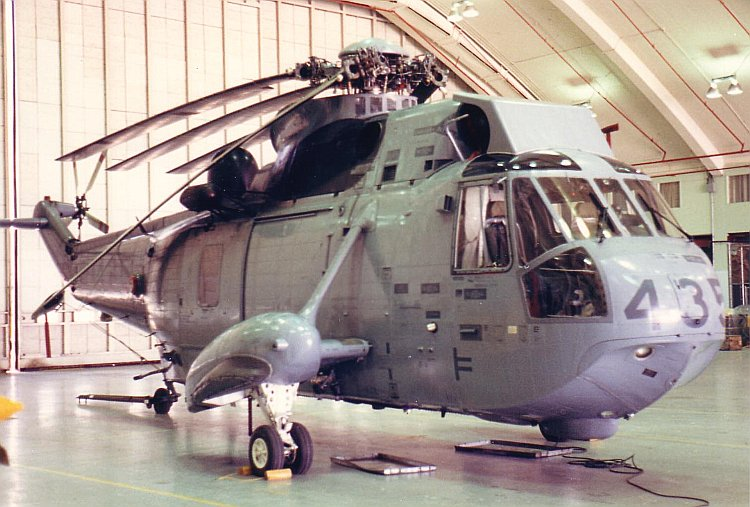
Sikorsky CH-124 Sea King

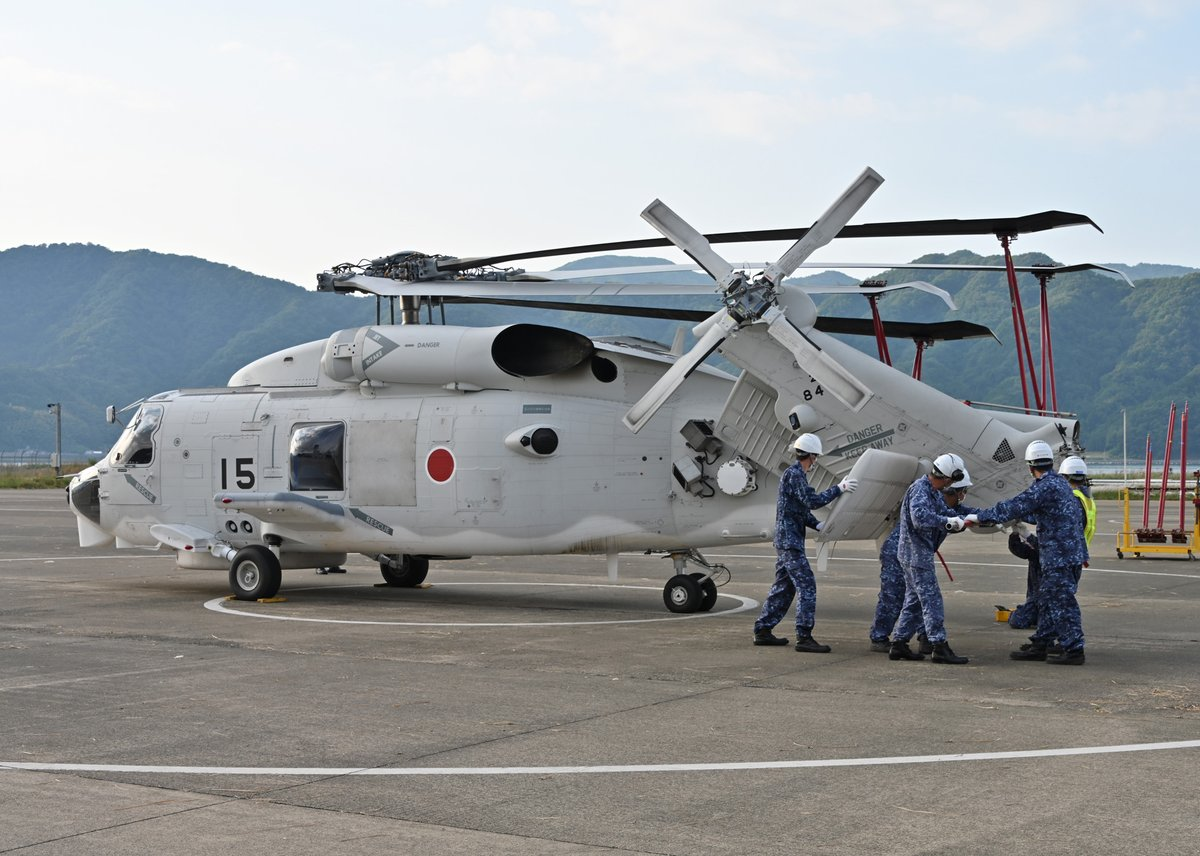
Sikorsky SH-60K

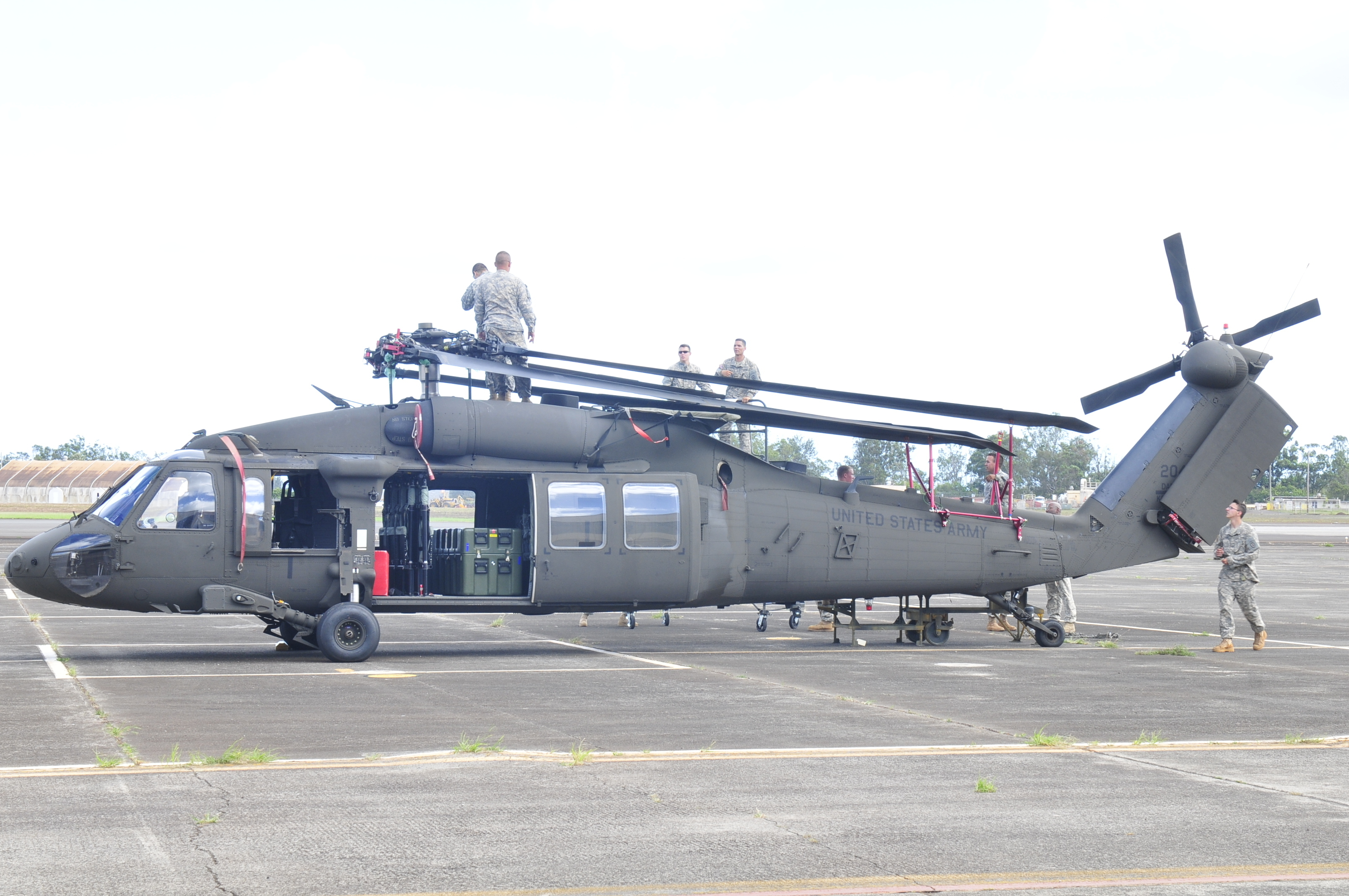
Sikorsky UH-60M

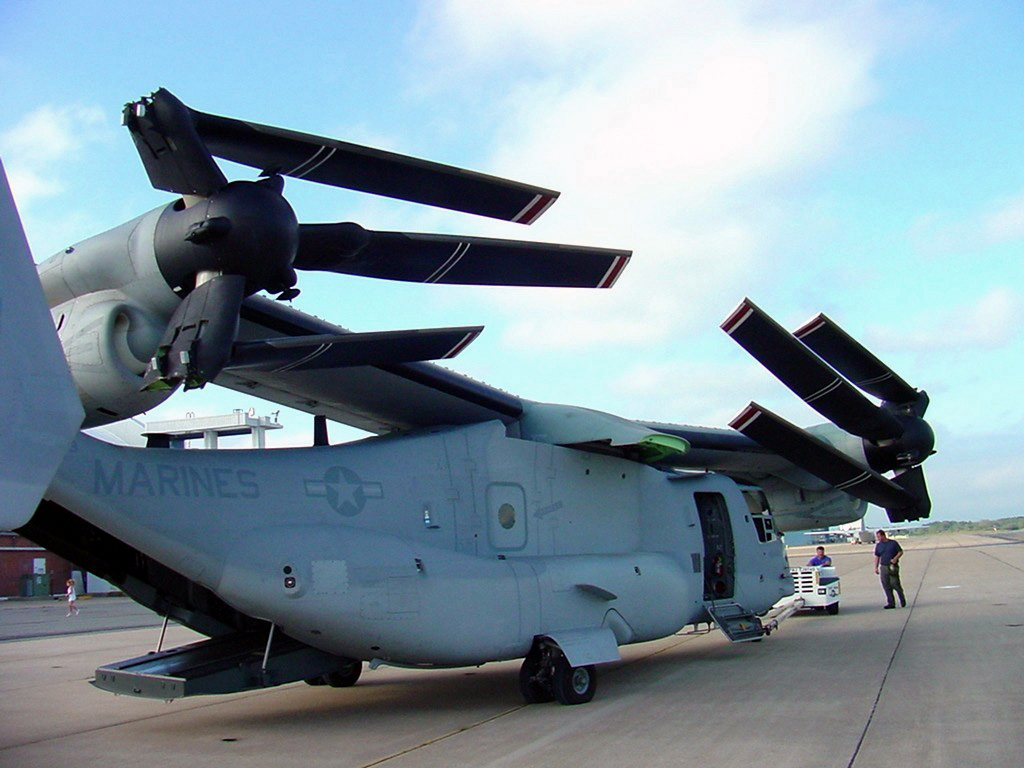
A V-22 Osprey with wings rotated parallel to fuselage

=== Overswept wings ===
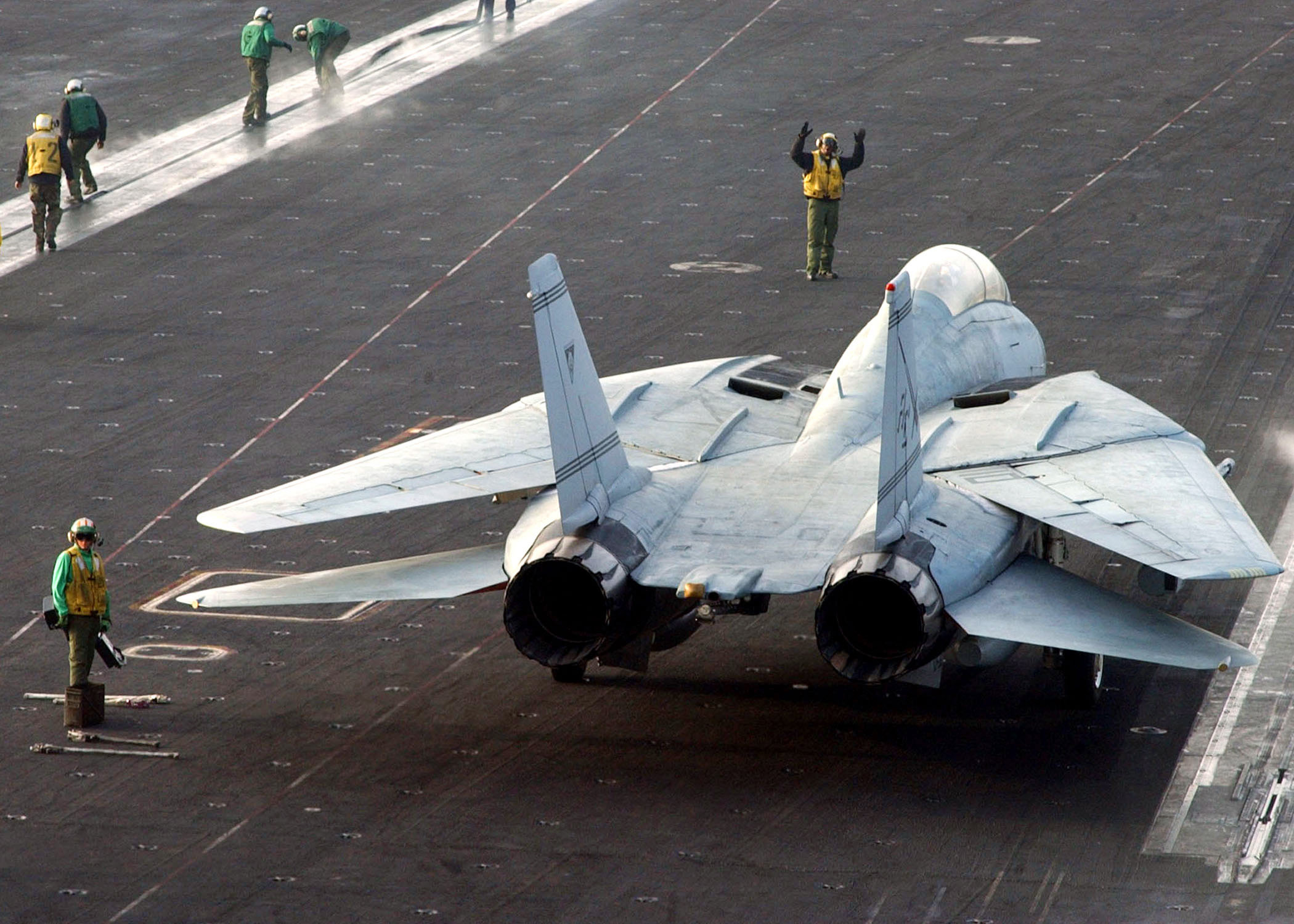
A Grumman F-14 Tomcat with its wings in the "oversweep" position

=== Folding-wing aircraft on flight decks ===
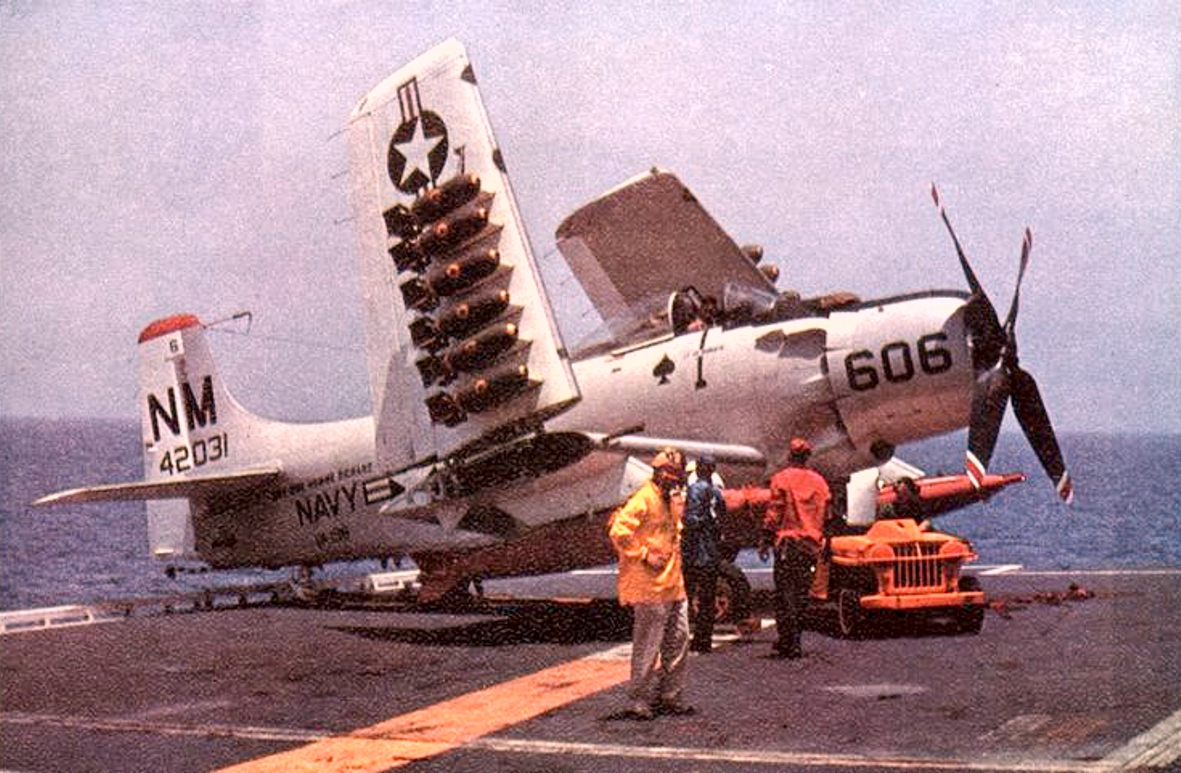
A-1J of VA-196 on USS Bon Homme Richard

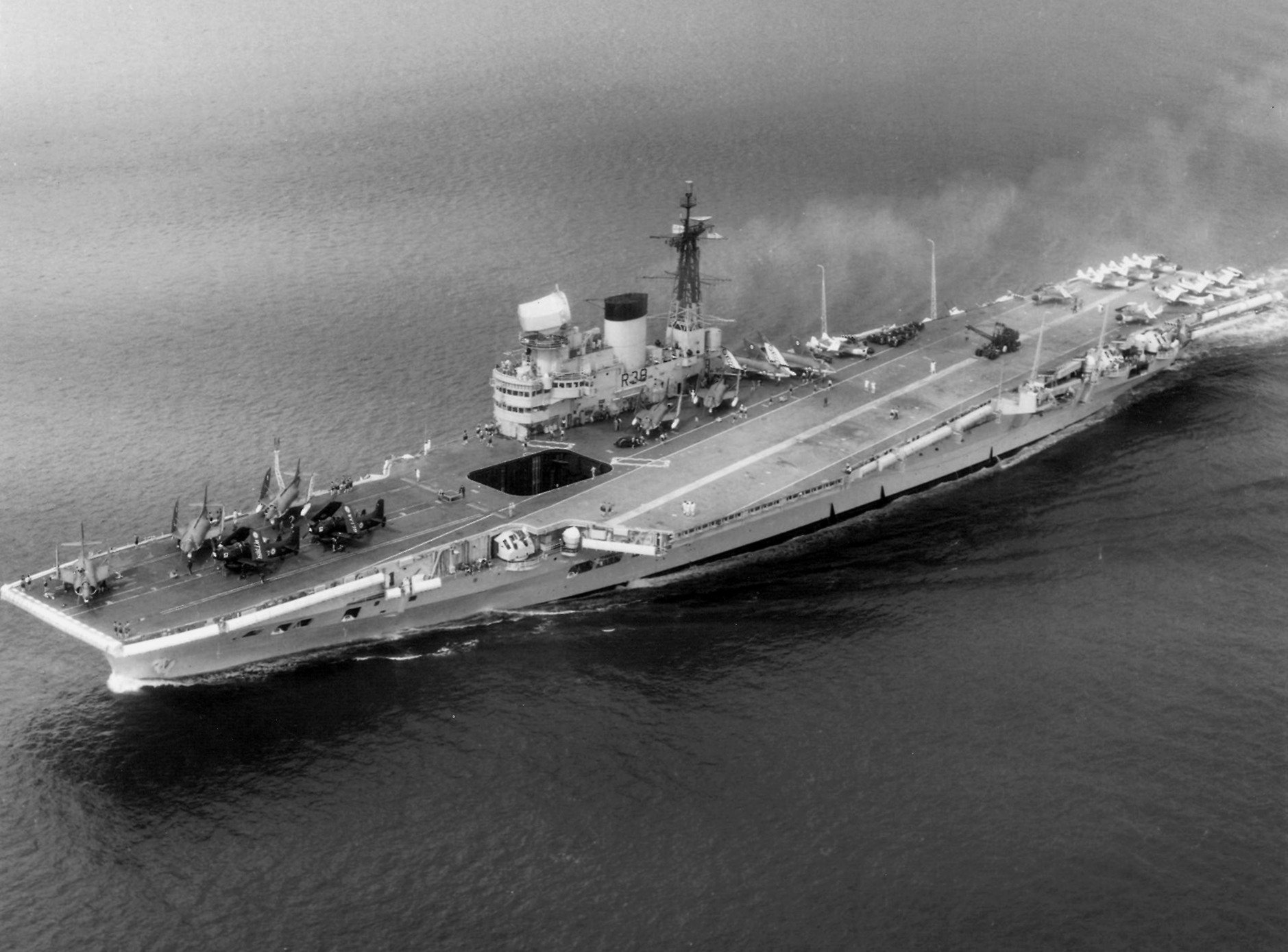
Sea Venoms, Scimitars, and Skyraiders on HMS Victorious (circa 1959-1960)

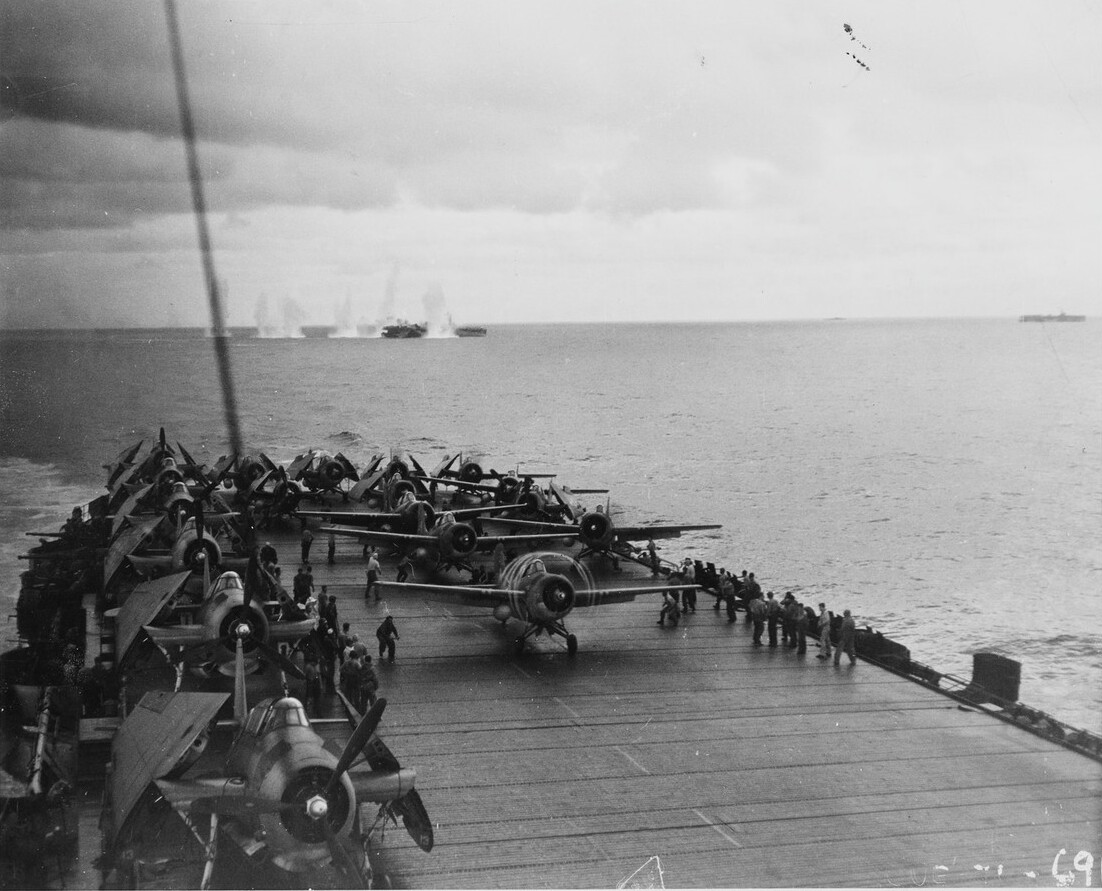
FM-2 Wildcats on USS Kitkun Bay (1944)

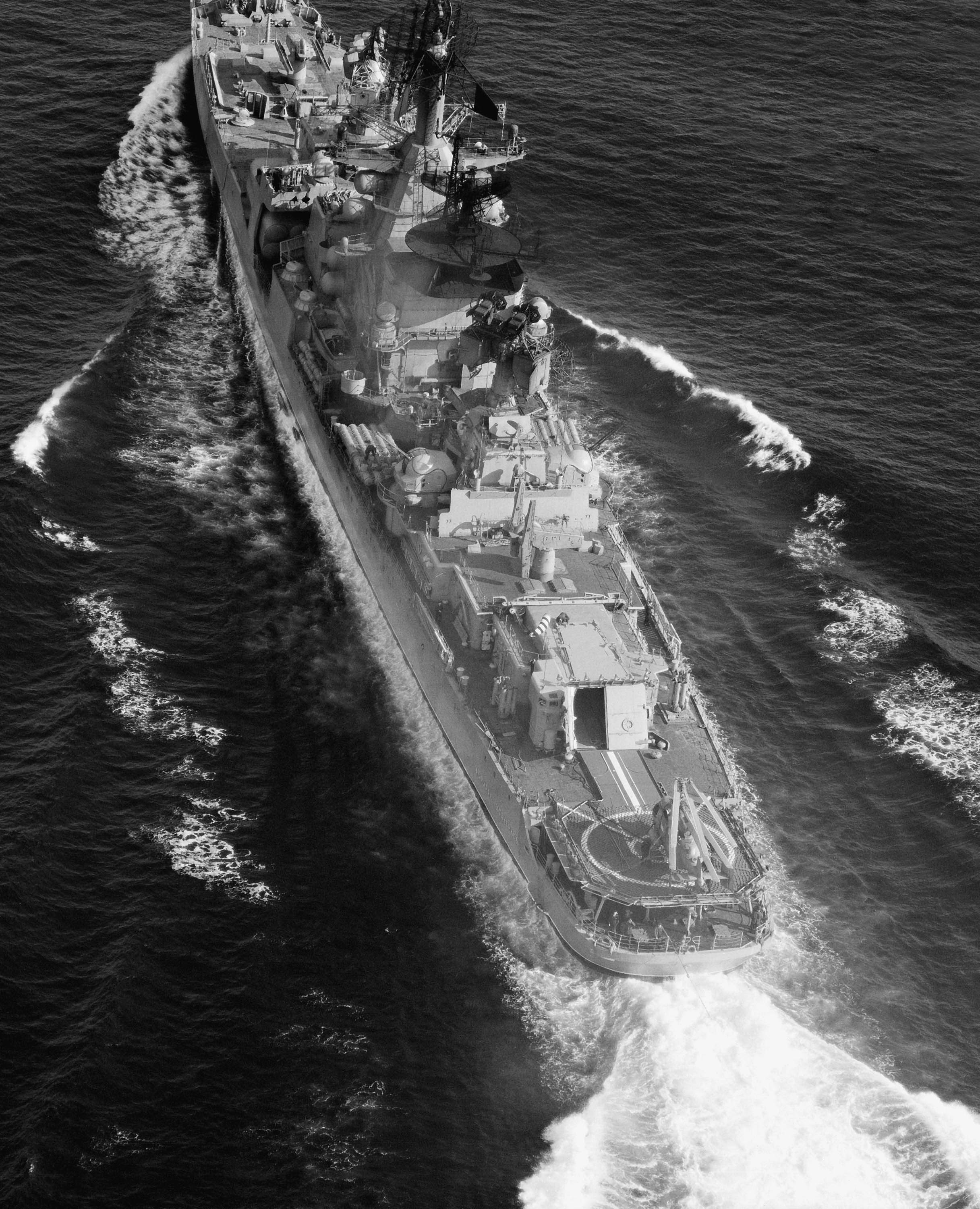
Kamov Ka-25 on the helideck of cruiser Admiral Isachenkov

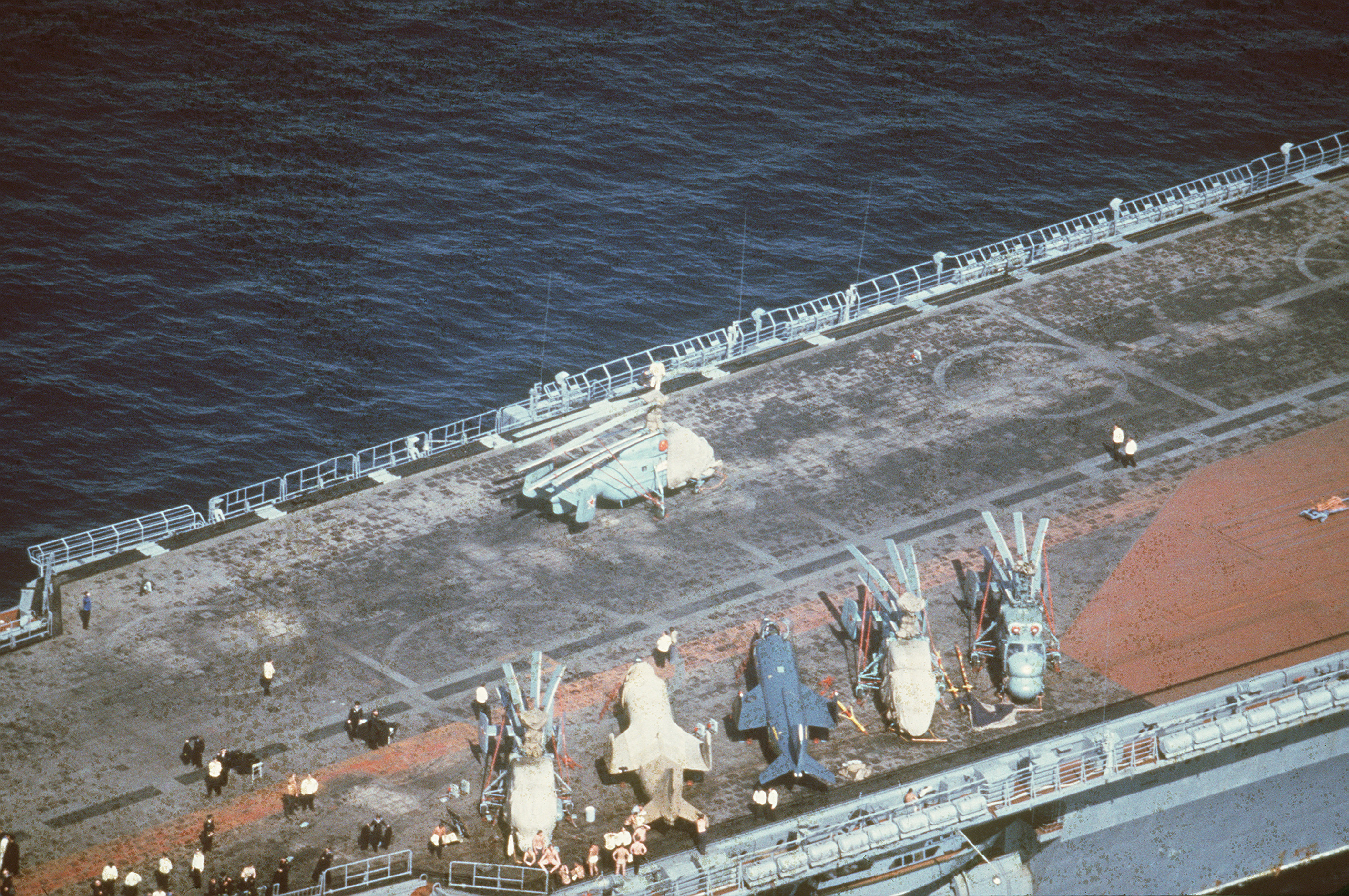
Ka-25 Hormone and Yak-38 Forger parked on the flight deck of the Soviet aircraft carrier Minsk.

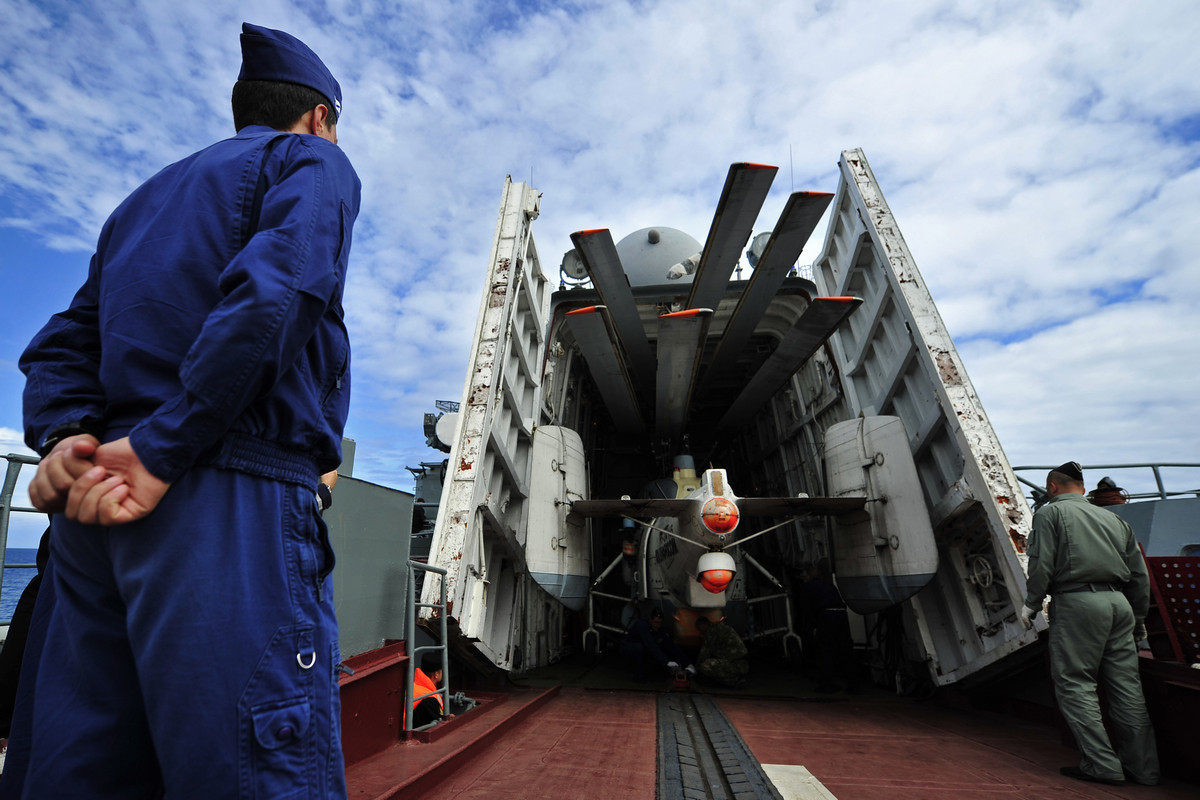
Ka-27PS

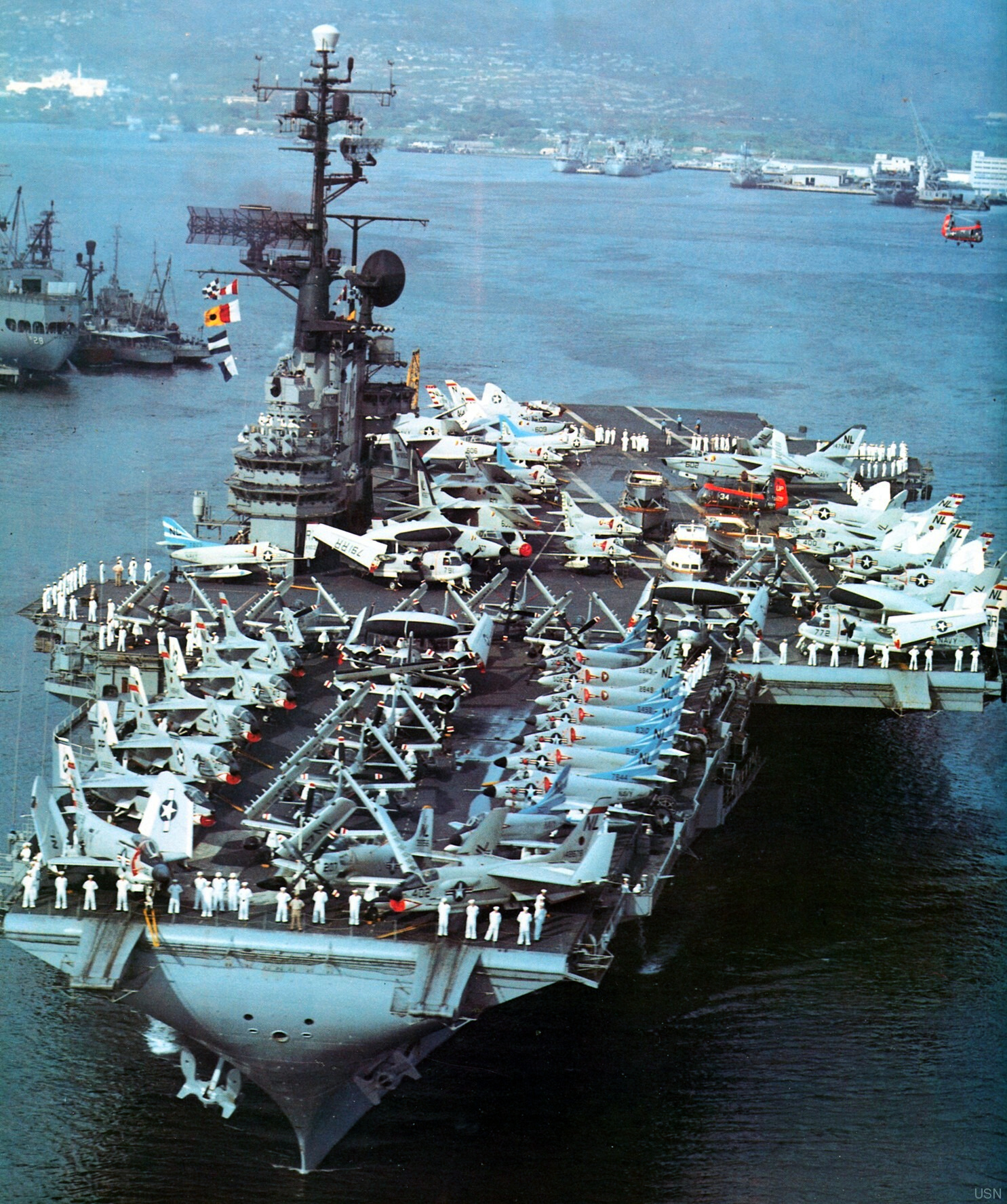
Demons, Crusaders, Skywarriors, Trackers, Tracers, and Skyraiders on USS Coral Sea (1963)

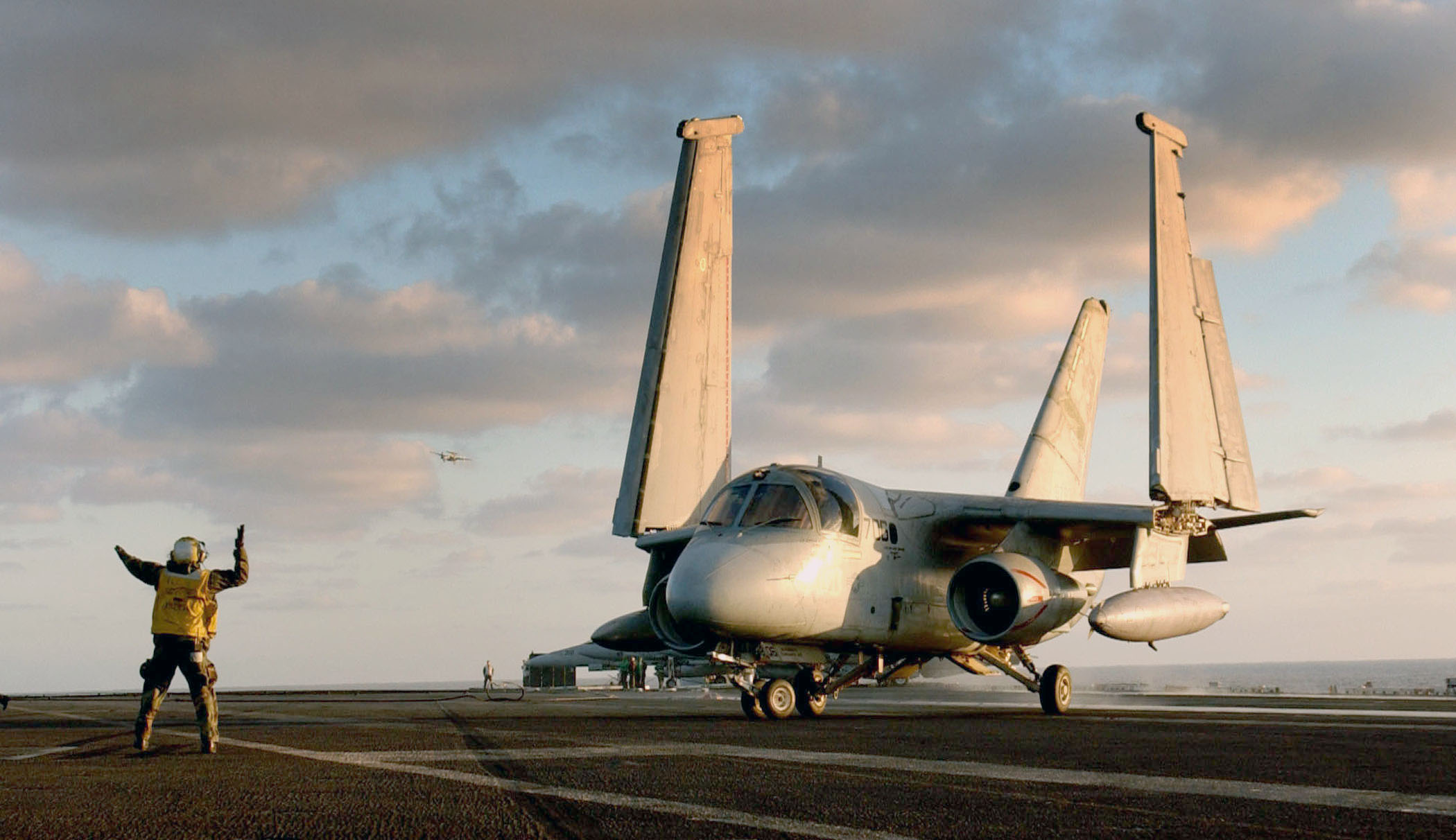
A Lockheed S-3 Viking on board USS John C. Stennis (2003)

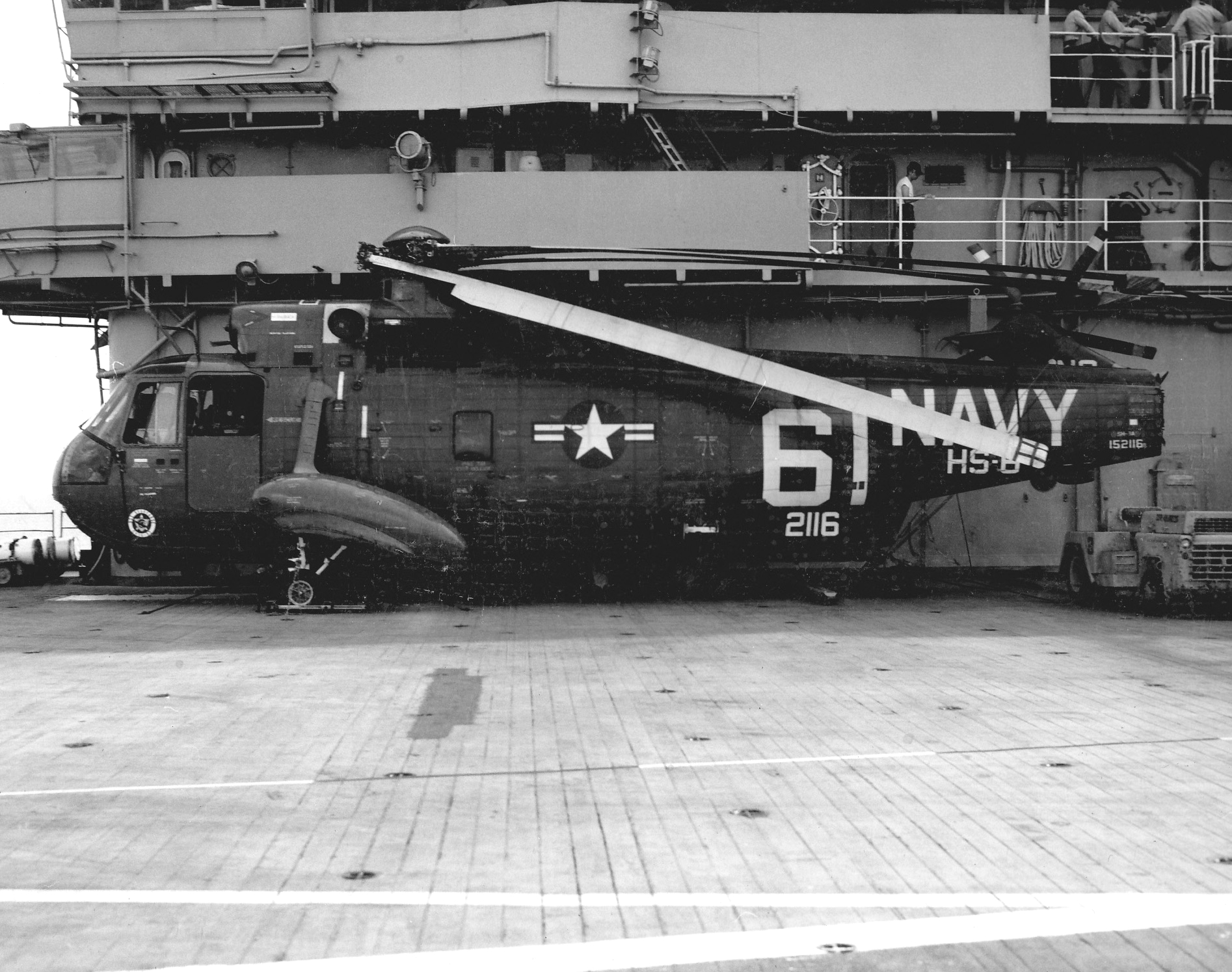
SH-3A Sea King of HS-6 aboard USS Kearsarge (CVS-33), circa 1964

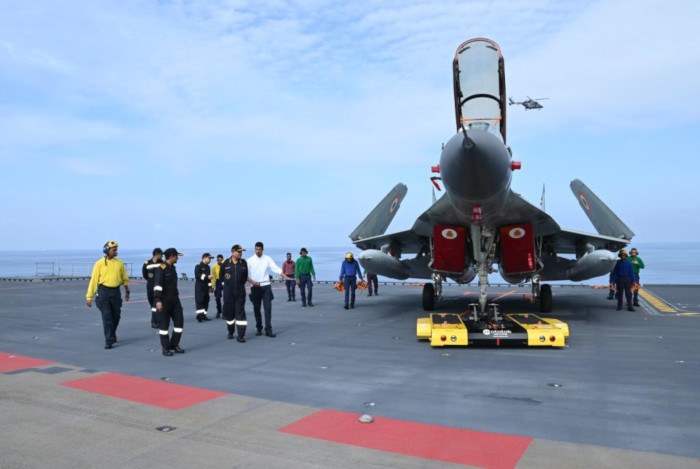
Indian Navy MiG-29K

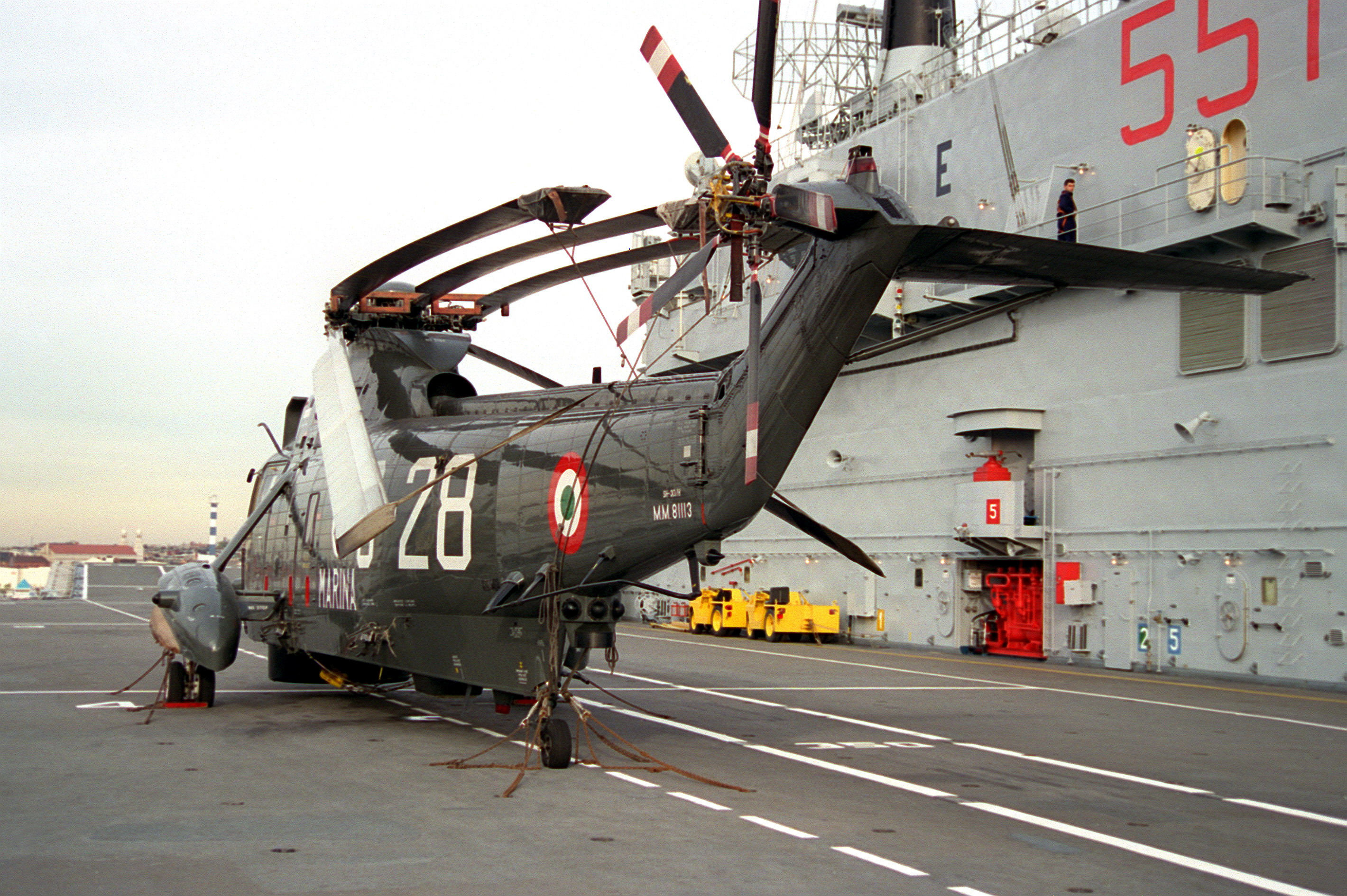
SH-3D/H Sea King on Italian aircraft carrier Giuseppe Garibaldi

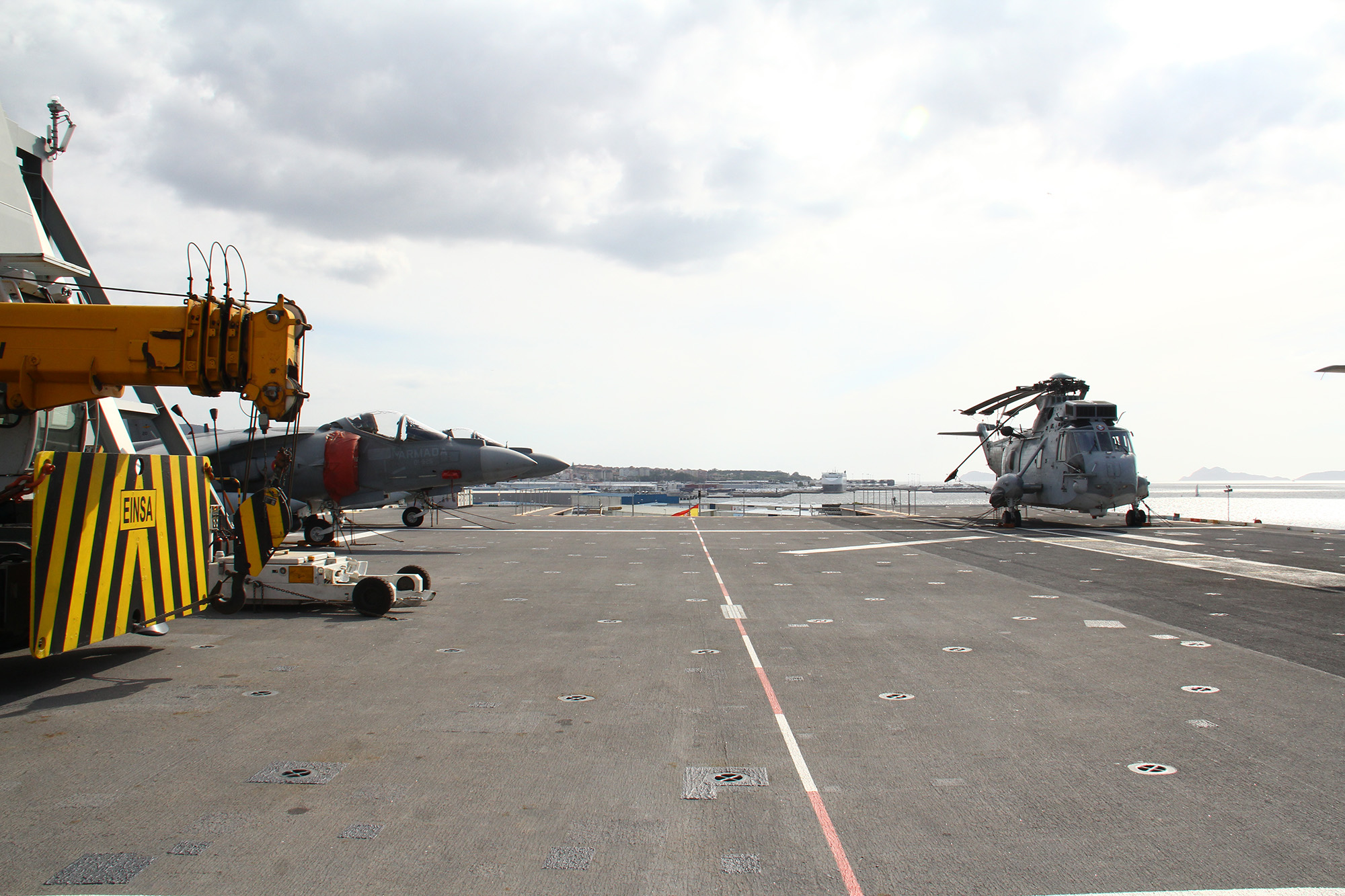
SH-3D/H Sea King on Spanish aircraft carrier Juan Carlos I

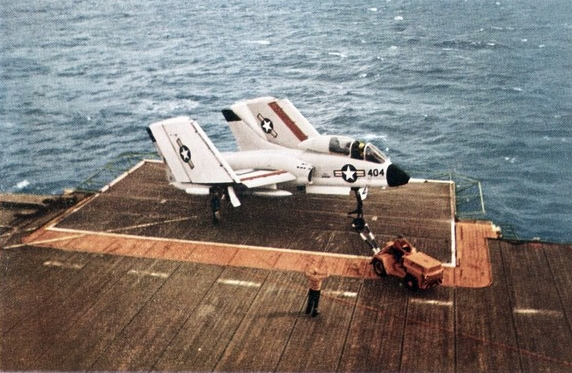
Vought F7U Cutlass on flight deck elevator

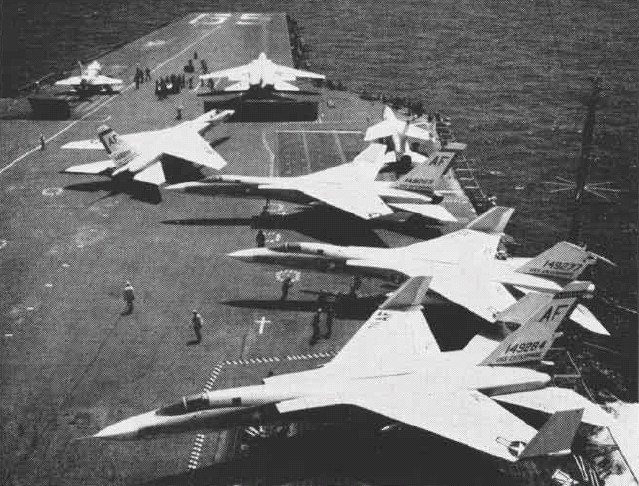
North American A-5 Vigilante on flight deck. Note the folded Vertical stabilizer

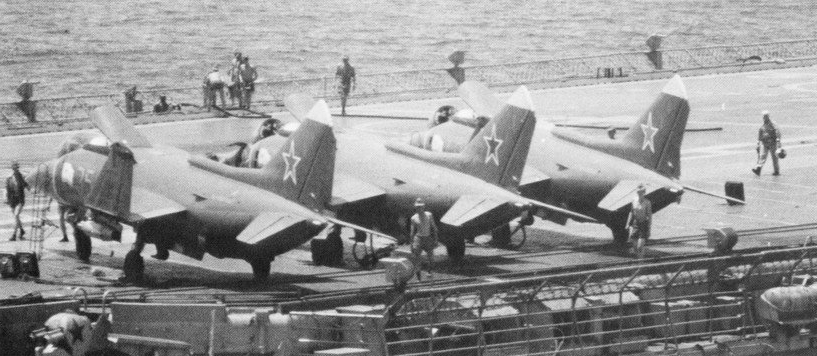
Yak-38 on Soviet carrier Minsk, 1980

== See also ==
- Index of aviation articles

== Bibliography ==
- Barnes C.H. & James D.N. (1989). Shorts Aircraft since 1900. London: Putnam. p. 560. ISBN 0-85177-819-4.
