= List of Mikoyan-Gurevich MiG-21 variants =

MiG-21
- Czech Republic MiG-21MF in flight

This is a list of variants and specifications for variants of the Mikoyan-Gurevich MiG-21, which differed considerably between models.

== Variants ==
All information in this section adapted from MiG-21 (2008).

=== Development and preproduction – Generation Zero (1954–1956) ===
Ye-1 (1954)
Preliminary swept-wing design around the Mikulin AM-5A non-reheated turbojet. Instead of building it, the design was quickly reworked into the Ye-2.
Ye-2 (1954; NATO: "Faceplate")
Swept-wing prototype with Mikulin AM-9B reheated turbojet, armed with three NR-30 cannon, and could carry one UB-16-57 rocket pod. Fitted with RSIU-4 VHF radio, Uzel IFF interrogator, ARK-5 Amur automatic direction finder with RUP landing approach computer, MRP-48P Dyatel marker beacon receiver, SRO-2 Khrom IFF transponder, Sirena-2 RWR, SRD-1M Radal'-M radar rangefinder linked to an ASP-5N computing gunsight. Ye-2 made its maiden flight on 14 February 1955, but programme was abandoned when the more powerful Mikulin RD-11 turbojet became available.
Ye-2A (1955; aka "MiG-23")
Ye-2 design modified for RD-11 turbojet. Six built. Identical to Ye-5 except for wings: Ye-2A had swept wings. Fitted with RSIU-4V radio, ARK-5 ADF with RUP module, MRP-48P marker beacon receiver, Bariy-M IFF transponder, Sirena-2 RWR, SRD-1M Radal'-M radar rangefinder with ASP-5N-V3 computing gunsight.

MiG-23 (1957; Izdeliye 63)

Ye-2A was assigned the production designation MiG-23. It was to be much like the prototype, but with SRD-5M Baza-6 radar rangefinder and an SRO-2 Khrom IFF transponder, amongst other changes. Of twelve units planned for 1957, only five were built; these were powered by R11-300 turbojets (production version of RD-11) and had one (centreline) hardpoint to carry a 400-litre drop tank, a UB-16-57 rocket pod or a FAB-250 bomb. All work on this aircraft was ordered to be terminated in 1958, and the units built were reused for various special test programmes.

Ye-4 (1955)
The first delta wing prototype of the MiG-21. Proof-of-concept testbed: initially fitted with non-afterburning 19.6 kN (4,410 lbf) Mikulin AM-5 engine and later with afterburning RD-9E.
Ye-50 (1956)
Swept-wing, experimental high-altitude mixed-power interceptor. Ye-2 airframe modified to fit Dushkin S-155 rocket motor, with RD-9E cruise engine. Design work started in 1954, Three prototypes built, with first flight on 9 January 1956. Programme terminated after crash of Ye-50/3 on 7 August 1957.
Ye-50A (1956)
The Ye-50A was a refinement of the Ye-50 based on the Ye-2A with R11E-300 cruise turbojet. Production planned with the designation MiG-23U (U = Uskoritel ("Booster")), but only one completed owing to unavailability of the R11E-300 turbojet.
Ye-50P (1958)
Proposed missile armed derivative of Ye-50A.
Ye-5 (1956)
Delta wing prototype powered by Mikulin AM-11 turbojet. Some changes besides the engine were made from the Ye-4, including addition of a second hydraulic system and revised airbrakes. The initial designation was I-500. Two built.
MiG-21 (1956; Izdeliye 65; NATO "Fishbed-A")
The first series of fighters, production version of Ye-5. Five units built at Tbilisi, but not continued due to efforts having been redirected towards the more advanced Ye-6/MiG-21F. The aircraft that were built found work as testbeds.

=== Initial mass production – generation one (1957–1961) ===
Ye-6 (1957)
Improved delta-wing fighter prototypes, powered by R11-F300 engine, with lower-set stabilizers. Three built.
Ye-50P (1958)
Rocket-boosted high-altitude interceptor project, terminated before construction.
MiG-21F (1959; Izdeliye 72; NATO "Fishbed-B")

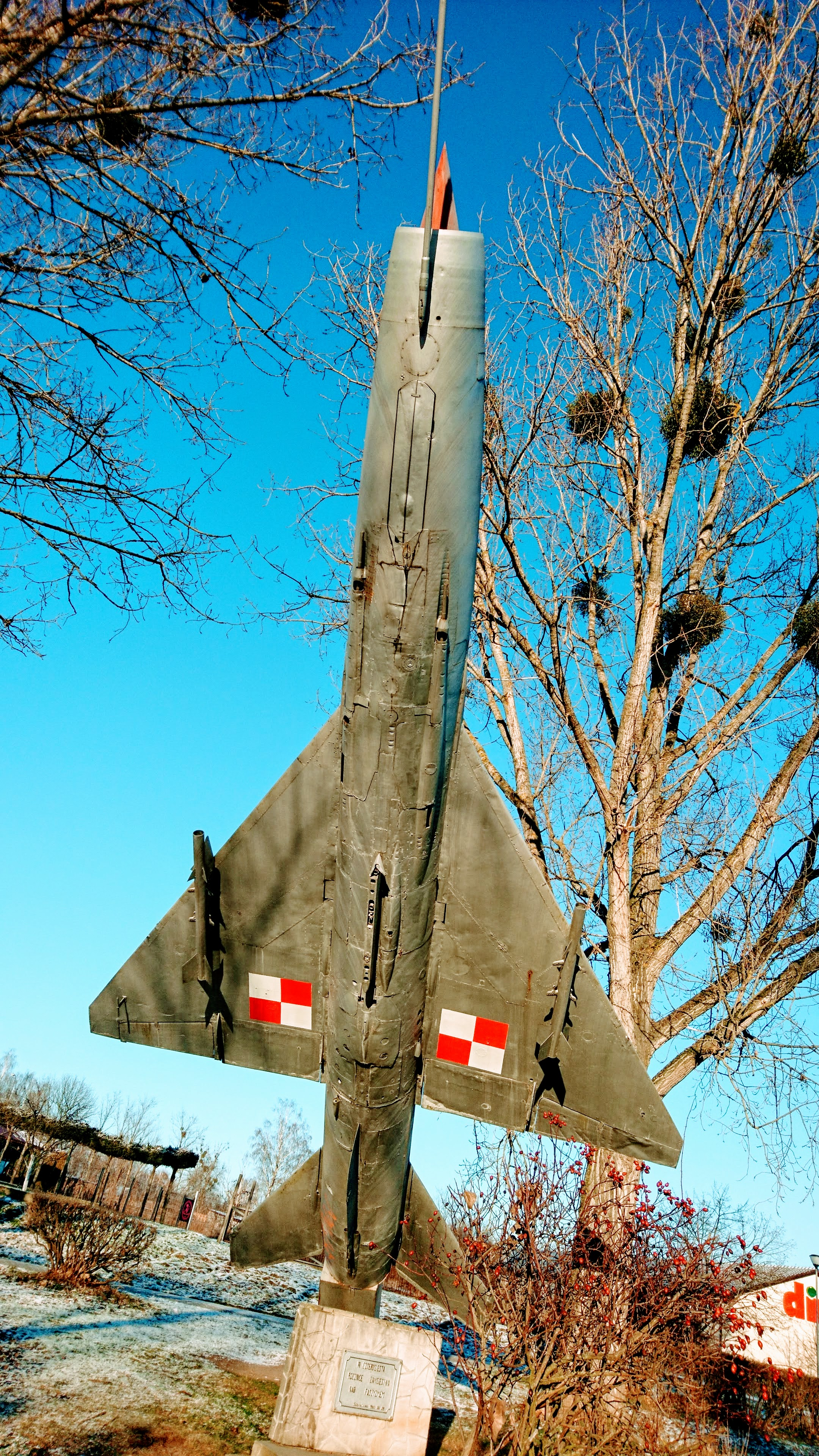
MiG-21F in Szprotawa, Poland, as a monument

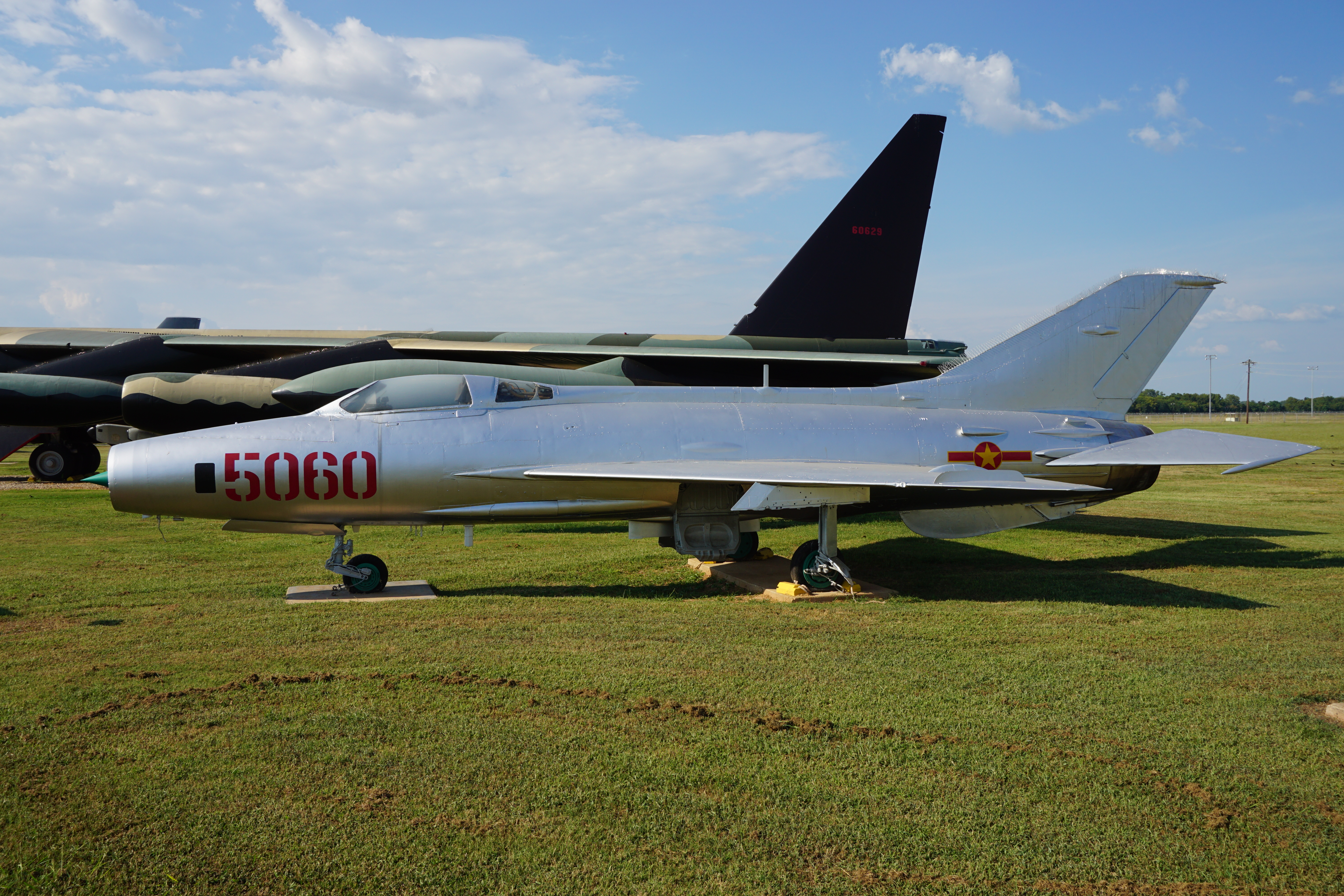
MiG-21F-13 at the Barksdale Global Power Museum

F = Forsirovannyy ("uprated")
Single-seat day fighter aircraft. It was the first production aircraft, with 93 machines being made (20 in 1959, 73 in 1960). The MiG-21F carried 2160 liters of fuel in six internal fuel tanks and was powered by an R11F-300 turbojet engine with 5740 kgf of thrust. The earliest units were fitted with one NR-30 and two NR-23 cannon, subsequent aircraft were armed with two 30-mm NR-30 cannons 60 shells each, it was also capable of carrying two bombs ranging from 50 to 500 kg each. Avionics included PUS-36D weapons sequencing module, R-800 communications radio, ASP-5NV-U1 computing gunsight, and SRD-5MN Baza-6 radar rangefinder.

Ye-6/9 (1960)

A production MiG-21F was modified in 1960 to test nuclear strike capability on the MiG-21 airframe.

Ye-6T (1958)
Prototypes based on MiG-21F used for testing the Vympel K-13 (NATO: AA-2 'Atoll') missile system. The aircraft were later reused for other tests.

Ye-6T/1 ("Ye-66") (1959)
Ye-6T/1 prototype, number 31 Red, was refitted with R11F2-300 engine to break the world speed record. "Ye-66" was a "fake" designation used on the documents submitted to the FAI; it was not the official designation. Konstantin Kokkinaki set a new world speed record on September 16, 1960 in this aircraft, reaching a top speed of 2499 km/h (1552 mph) on a 100 km closed course. (FAI says the 100-km record set on that date by Vladimir Kokkinaki was 2148.66 km/h; it says an E-66 averaged 2388 km/h for 100 km on 31 October 1959.)
Ye-6T/1 ("Ye-66A") (1961)

After setting a new world speed record, Ye-6T/1 "31 Red" was rebuilt again to try to set a new world altitude record. To this end it had a U-21 rocket booster added to a fairing in the tail, and kept the upgraded R11F2-300 turbojet. "Ye-66A" was a "fake" designation used on the documents submitted to the FAI; it was not the official designation. On April 28, 1961, Georgi Mosolov set the new altitude record at 34,714 m (113,891 ft), breaking the previous record set by an American pilot in an F-104 Starfighter by 2899 m (9,511 ft).

Ye-6T/2 (1961)

Second prototype Ye-6T reused to test skid-type landing gear for use on dirt strips.

Ye-6T/3 (1961)

Ye-6T with canards fitted, tested 1961–1962.

MiG-21P-13 (aka Ye-7) (1958)
P = Perekhvatchik ("interceptor"), 13 = refers to K-13 missile system

Two MiG-21 sans suffixe (izdeliye 65) were converted to use K-13 missile system as part of a development project for an interceptor armed with the K-13 missile. Due to the MiG-21P-13 project lagging behind schedule, it was decided to produce the existing MiG-21F with the capability to use the K-13 missile system, resulting in the MiG-21F-13. The development continued, however, eventually resulting in the MiG-21PF.

MiG-21F-13 (1960; Izdeliye 74; NATO "Fishbed-C")

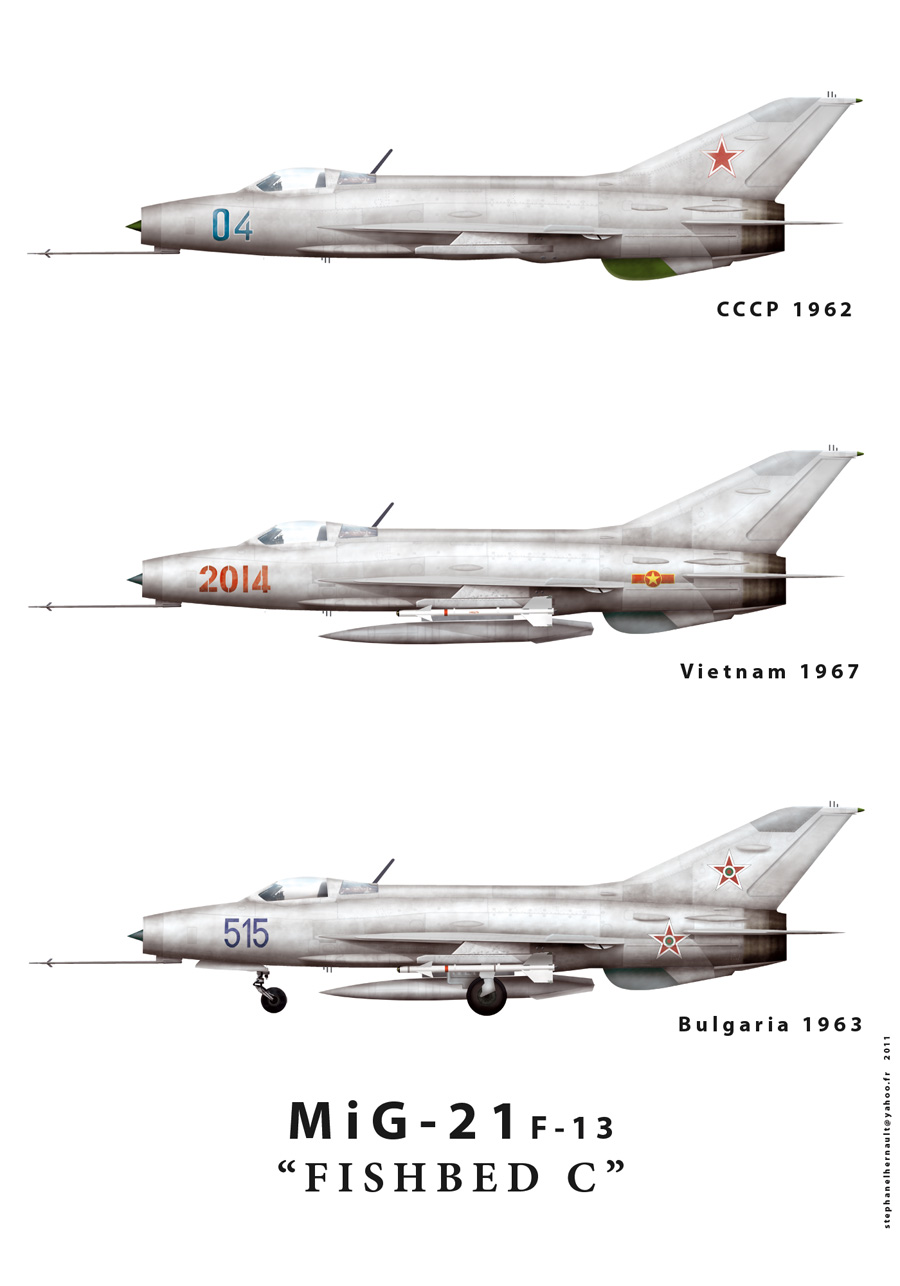
MiG-21F-13

F = Forsirovannyy ("Uprated"), 13 = refers to K-13 missile system

Short-range day fighter; the MiG-21F-13 was the first MiG-21 model to be produced in large numbers. Unlike the MiG-21F, the MiG-21F-13 had only one NR-30 cannon on the starboard side, with only 60 rounds; however, it added the capability to use the K-13 missile system, of which two could be carried on underwing hardpoints. On early-production MiG-21F-13s the launch rails were of the APU-28 type; later models had these replaced by APU-13 rails. The launch rails were removable, allowing the MiG-21F-13 to carry two UB-16-57 unguided rocket launchers, two S-24 rockets on PU-12-40 launch rails or two FAB-100/250/500 bombs or ZB-360 napalm tanks. The F-13 had further upgrades: an improved ASP-5ND optical gunsight and an upgraded SRD-5ND ranging radar. The MiG-21F-13 was also built under licence in China as the Chengdu J-7 or F-7 for export, as well as in Czechoslovakia as the Aero S-106, though the S-106 designation was not used for long; subsequently, the Czech-built units were referred to as "MiG-21F-13" just like the Soviet-built aircraft.
MiG-21FR

Czechoslovak designation for MiG-21F-13 and Aero S.106 (Czech-built MiG-21F-13) converted to carry reconnaissance pods.

MiG-21F-13R (1974)

R = Razuznavatelen ("Reconnaissance")
Bulgarian designation for MiG-21F-13 aircraft locally modified to carry an AFA-39 camera.

Ye-6V (1961; NATO "Fishbed-E")
Experimental STOL version of MiG-21F-13 with JATO boosters.

=== Interceptors – generation two (1961–1966) ===
MiG-21PF (1961; Izdeliye 76; NATO "Fishbed-D")
P = Perekhvatchik ("Interceptor"), F = Forsirovannyy ("Uprated")

Production version of the all-weather interceptor. These were powered by the R11F2-300 turbojet and, starting with the seventh production batch, fitted with the RP-21 radar (the first six batches used the older TsD-30T radar (aka RP-9-21). Further, the weapons control system was modified from that of the F-13 to allow use of the RS-2US (aka K-5MS) beam-riding AAM in addition to the IR-seeking K-13.
MiG-21PF (1961; Izdeliye 76A)

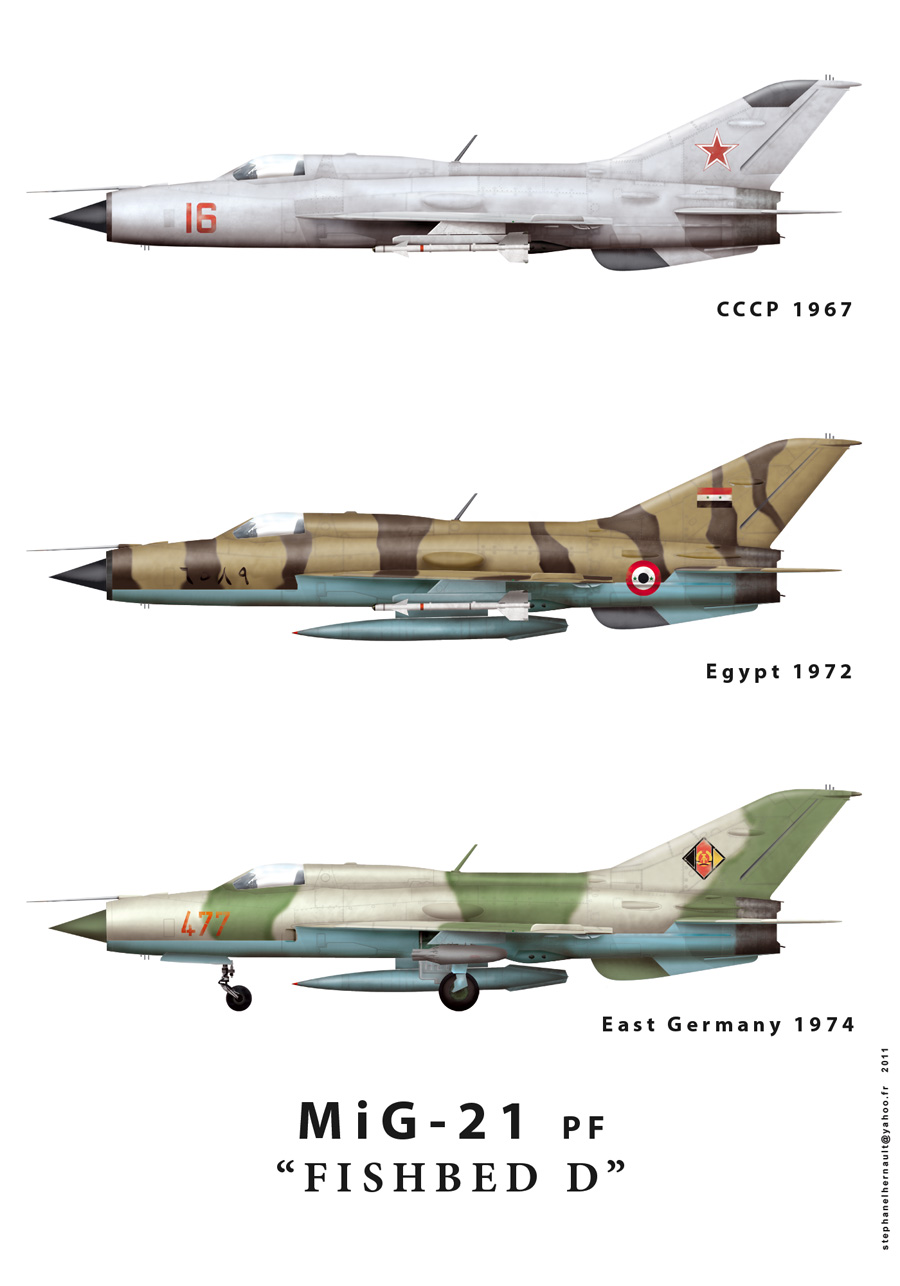
MiG-21PF

Version for export to Warsaw Pact countries; only difference from domestic version was the IFF equipment.

MiG-21PFL (1966; Izdeliye 76A)

L = Lokator ("Radar")

Version of MiG-21PF tailored to a Vietnamese requirement. The "L" designation may be short for lokator to reflect the different sensor suite in this version as compared to the standard PF.

MiG-21PFM (Izdeliye 76A)

M = Modifiziert ("Modified")

Not to be confused with the "real" MiG-21PFM which is izdeliye 94. This was an East German designation for MiG-21PF aircraft with upgraded RP-21 radars.

MiG-21RFM (Izdeliye 76A)

R = Radar ("Radar"), F = Forțaj ("Reheat"), M = "Modernizat" ("Modernised")

Romanian designation for the MiG-21PF.

MiG-21Ye

Remote-controlled drones converted from MiG-21PF; also designated M-21 (M = mishen', "target").

MiG-21FL (1965; Izdeliye 77)
F = Forsazh ("Reheat"), L = Lokator ("Radar")

Export (Third world) model of the MiG-21PF. Downgraded from baseline MiG-21PF with older and less powerful R11F-300 engine, no provision for carrying RS-2US beam-riding missiles and a simplified, downgraded version of the RP-21 radar, designated R1L. Wide-chord fin and brake chute fairing at its base. Built under license in India as the Type 77.

Ye-7SPS (1961)
SPS = Sduv Pogranichnovo Sloya ("Boundary Layer Blowing")

Testbed to develop flap-blowing system, rebuilt from Ye-6V/2.

MiG-21PFS (1963; Izdeliye 94; NATO "Fishbed-D/F")
P = Perekhvatchik ("Interceptor"), F = Forsirovannyy ("Uprated"), S = Sduv Pogranichnovo Sloya ("Boundary Layer Blowing")

Production version of Ye-7SPS.
MiG-21PFS (Izdeliye 94; NATO "Fishbed-D")

The first nine production batches of the MiG-21PFS were externally identical to the MiG-21PF but with blown flaps and brake chute fairing at the fin's base.

MiG-21PFS (Izdeliye 94; NATO "Fishbed-F")

From batch 10 to batch 19, the large-chord vertical stabiliser first seen on the MiG-21FL was introduced, but the aircraft retained the SK ejection seat and one-piece, forward-opening canopy of the MiG-21PF.

MiG-21PFS (Izdeliye 94; NATO "Fishbed-F")

From c/n 941314 onwards, MiG-21PFS aircraft had the wide-chord tail, a KM-1 ejection seat and a two-piece, sidewards-opening canopy.

Ye-7M
Further development of the Ye-7SPS; prototype for MiG-21PFM.

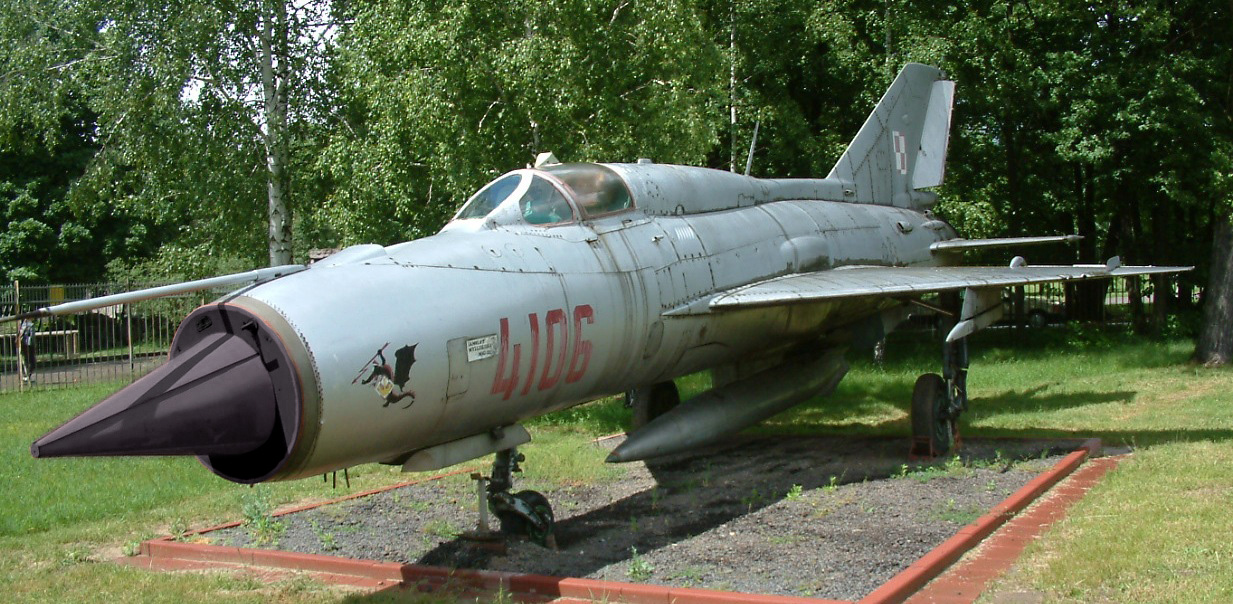
MiG-21PFM (izd. 94A), Polish Air Force, markings of 10th Fighter Regt.

MiG-21PFM (1964; Izdeliye 94; NATO "Fishbed-F")
P = Perekhvatchik ("Interceptor"), F = Forsirovannyy ("Uprated"), M = Modernizirovannyy ("Modernised")

The production version of the Ye-7M was a modernised MiG-21PF, with an upgraded RP-21M radar, SRZO-2 Khrom-Nikkel IFF transponder and other changes in avionics. Further, later-production PFMs reintroduced cannon armament, in the form of the capability to carry a GSh-23 cannon and 200 rounds in an underbelly pod. Following tests in 1966, MiG-21PFM aircraft built after 1968 could carry the Kh-66 air-to-surface missile.
MiG-21PFM (1964; Izdeliye 94A; NATO "Fishbed-F")

Export version with a different IFF system and no capacity to carry S-24 rockets or ZB-62 napalm tanks.

MiG-21PFM (Izdeliye 94N; NATO "Fishbed-F")

Nuclear-capable version of MiG-21PFM.

MiG-21PFMA (Izdeliye 94A)

Polish designation of standard MiG-21PFM.

MiG-21PFMN (Izdeliye 94N)

Polish designation of nuclear-capable MiG-21PFM.

MiG-21RFMM (Izdeliye 94A)

R = Radar, F = Fortaj ("Reheat"), M = Modernizat ("Modernised")

Romanian designation for the MiG-21PFM.

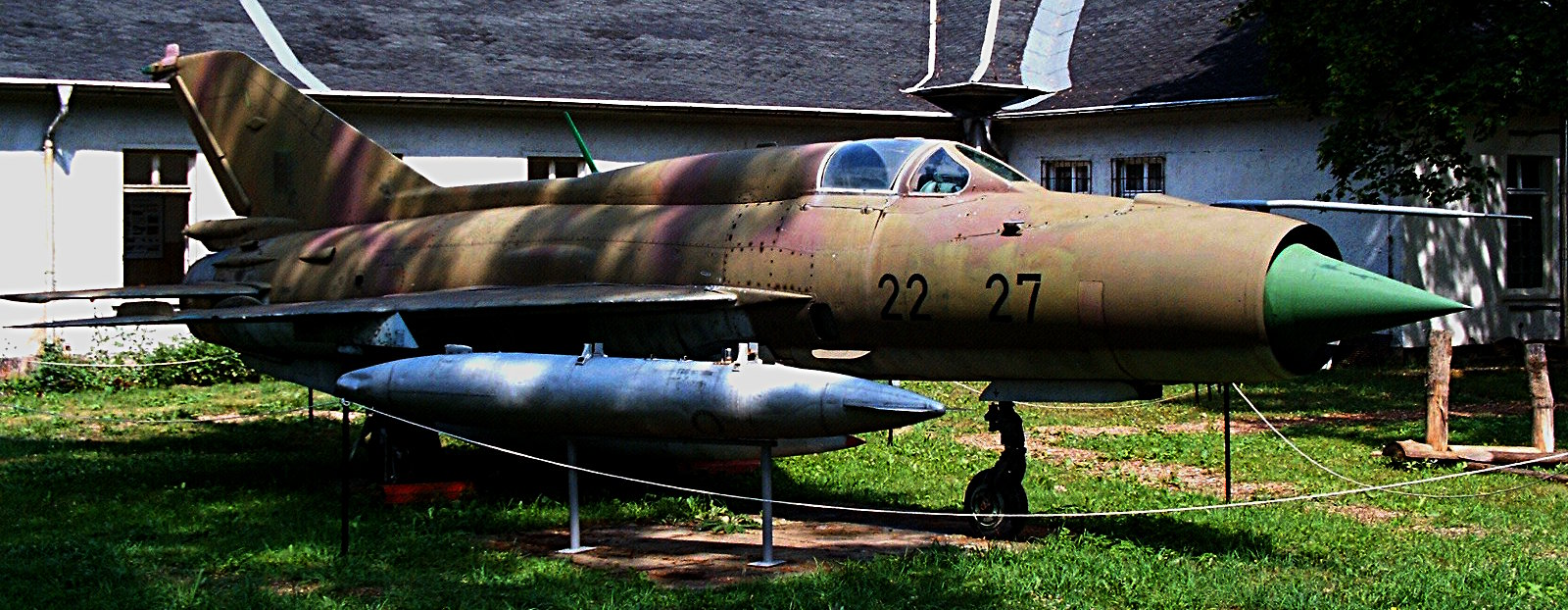
MiG-21 SPS

MiG-21SPS (Izdeliye 94A; NATO "Fishbed-F")

SPS = Sduv Pogranichnovo Sloya ("Boundary Layer Blowing")

To avoid confusion with the local "MiG-21PFM" designation given to the modified MiG-21PF (izdeliye 76A), the East German air force redesignated the "real" MiG-21PFM of izdeliye 94A as "MiG-21SPS."

MiG-21SPS-K (Izdeliye 94A; NATO "Fishbed-F")

K = Kanone ("Cannon")

East German designation for MiG-21PFM (Izd. 94A) aircraft wired for using cannon pods.

Ye-7R
Prototypes of the MiG-21R combat-capable reconnaissance aircraft derived from MiG-21PFS.
MiG-21R (1965; Izdeliye 03/94R; NATO "Fishbed-H")
Initially designated Izdeliye 03 to confuse outsiders, the MiG-21R's official "type" designation was Izdeliye 94R. The first production unit was rolled out in early 1966 and production continued until 1971. For recce missions, the MiG-21R could carry a Type D daylight PHOTINT pod, a Type N nighttime PHOTINT pod, a Type R general-purpose ELINT pod or a Type T pod housing a TV system, making the MiG-21R one of the first Soviet recce aircraft to make use of ELINT equipment. Small changes were made throughout the production run. Early-production units had the R11F2S-300 turbojet, which was replaced in later machines by the R13-300 powerplant. In the air-to-air role, the MiG-21R could carry two RS-2US or R-3S AAMs, and in the strike role it could be loaded with two UB-16-57UM or UB-32 rocket pods, two S-24 heavy unguided rockets or two bombs of up to 500kg weight (each).

MiG-21R (Izdeliye 94RA; NATO "Fishbed-H")
Export version of the MiG-21R, delivered with the Type D and Type R pods.
MiG-21RF (Izdeliye 94RA; NATO "Fishbed-H")

Egyptian designation for MiG-21R aircraft which had been locally modified by permanently mounting the cameras in a fairing under the nose.

MiG-21RF (Izdeliye 96R; NATO "Fishbed-H")

Not to be confused with the Egyptian local designation "MiG-21RF." This designation was used after some MiG-21Rs were upgraded with R13-300 engines as in the MiG-21MF.

Ye-7S (1963)
Tactical fighter prototype – a production MiG-21PF converted into an avionics testbed to test the Sapfir-21 fire-control radar.
MiG-21S (1964; Izdeliye 95; NATO "Fishbed-J")
S = Sapfir (referring to the Sapfir-21/RP-22 radar).

The production version of the Ye-7S. This was fitted with the RP-22 radar (production version of the Sapfir-21 radar) working together with a ASP-PF-21 computing gunsight. The airframe was different from that of the MiG-21PFM by using the same saddle tank as in the MiG-21R. The MiG-21S had an R11F2S-300 powerplant and an AP-155 autopilot featuring a 'panic button' autorecovery system. The MiG-21S could carry the GP-9 cannon pod. It had four underwing hardpoints, with the two outboard pods being "wet", that is, they could carry drop tanks. It could carry all weapons that the MiG-21PFM could, with the addition of the R-3R (K-13R) missile, the semi-active radar homing variant of the K-13. MiG-21S was produced from 1965 to 1968 and delivered only to the Soviet air force.

MiG-21N (1965; Izdeliye 95N; NATO "Fishbed-J")
N = Nositel ("Carrier")

Also known as MiG-21SN, this was a variation of the MiG-21S capable of delivering one RN-25 tactical nuclear weapon.

MiG-21PD (1966; Izdeliye 23-31/92)
PD = Podyomniye Dvigateli ("Lifting Engines")

STOL technology demonstrator built out of a MiG-21PFM airframe.

=== Modernisation – generation three (1968–1972) ===
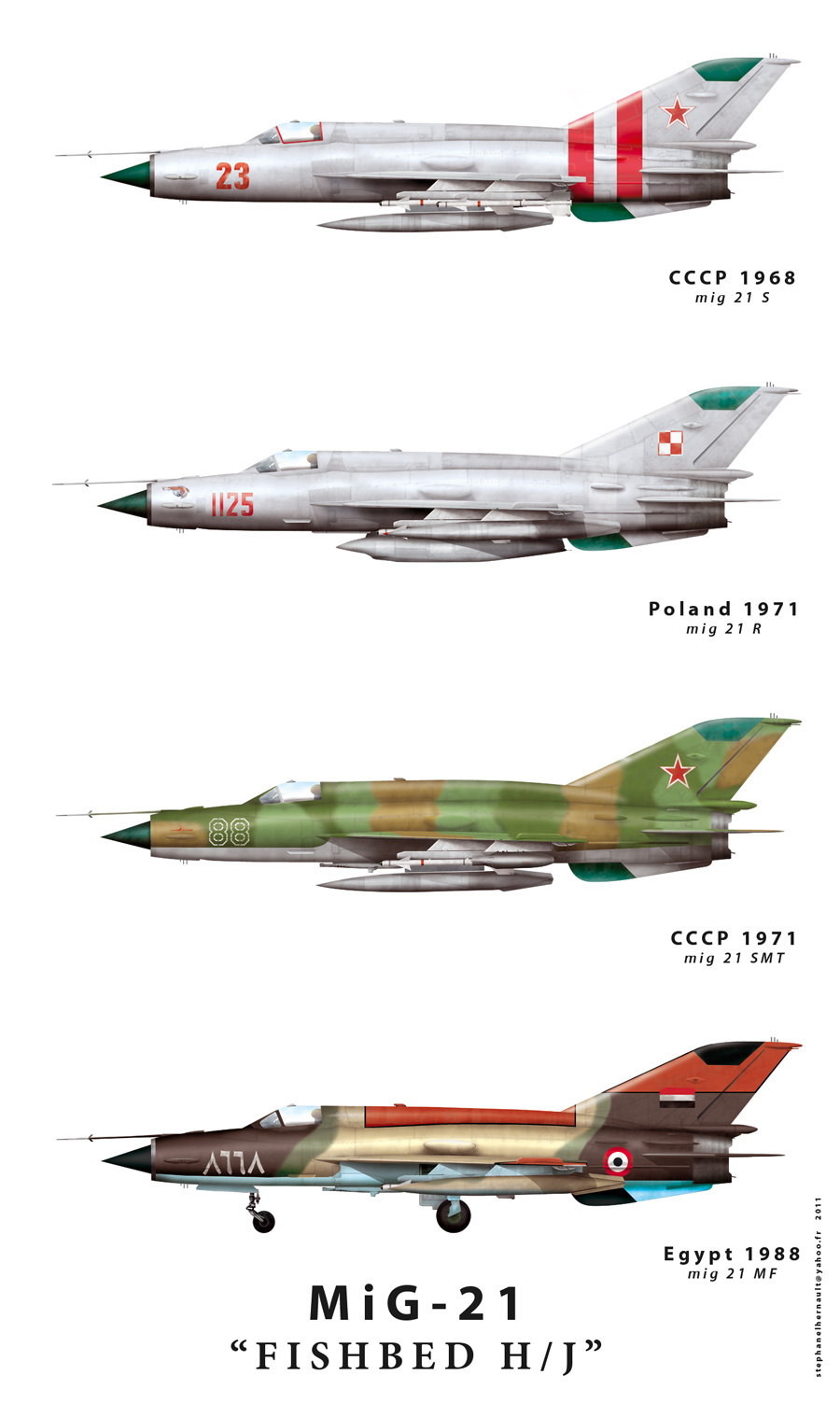
MiG-21 Fishbed-H/J

MiG-21M (1968; Izdeliye 96; NATO "Fishbed-J")
M = Modernizirovannyy ("Modernised")

Export variant of the MiG-21S with two major differences: the RP-22 radar of the MiG-21S was substituted with the older RP-21MA radar, and featured a built-in GSh-23L cannon instead of a cannon pod. In the air-to-air role it could only carry the R-3S IR-seeking AAM on its four pylons, as the SARH variant, the R-3R, was not cleared for export. The type was also licence-built in India, the first Indian-built example being delivered in February 1973.

MiG-21M (Izdeliye 96A, NATO "Fishbed-J")
Export variant for Warsaw Pact countries.
MiG-21MA (Izdeliye 96A, NATO "Fishbed-J")
The Czechoslovak Air Force redesignated its MiG-21Ms that had been re-engined with the Tumanskiy R13-300 engine as "MiG-21MA," keeping the RP-21MA radar. Some of these were later re-equipped with the RP-22 radar – bringing it to MiG-21MF standard – and were then redesignated "MiG-21MF."

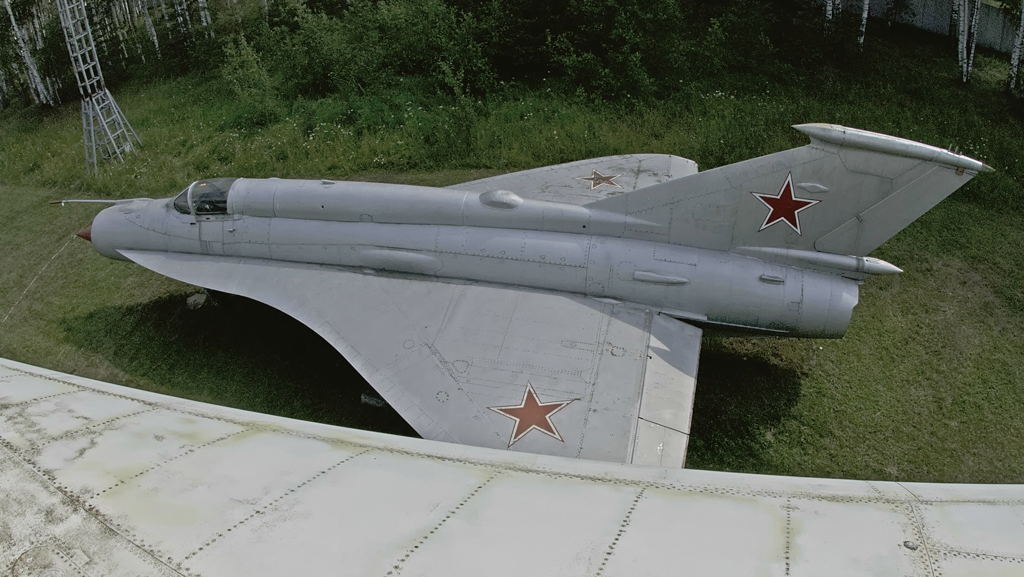
MiG-21I Analog

MiG-21I (1968; Izdeliye 21-11; "Analog")

I = Imitator ("Simulator")

Testbed for the wing design of the Tu-144 (NATO "Charger") supersonic transport.

MiG-21K (1969; proposal)
This was a proposed variant of the MiG-21 for a dedicated ground attack role; the Mikoyan proposal was withdrawn before phase two of the competition, which was eventually won by the Su-25.
MiG-21Sh (1969; "Izdeliye 21-32"; project)
Sh = Shturmovik

This was another ground-attack project that was a "fusion" of the MiG-21 and the MiG-27; it was referred to alternatively as MiG-21Sh and MiG-27Sh. Cancelled due to the MiG-23/27 offering higher performance.

MiG-21SM (1969; Izdeliye 15/95M; NATO "Fishbed-J")
S = Sapfir (referring to the Sapfir-21/RP-22 radar).

M = Modernizirovannyy ("Modernised")

Upgrade of the MiG-21S using the R13-300 engine and with a built-in GSh-23L cannon, as well as a considerably updated avionics package.

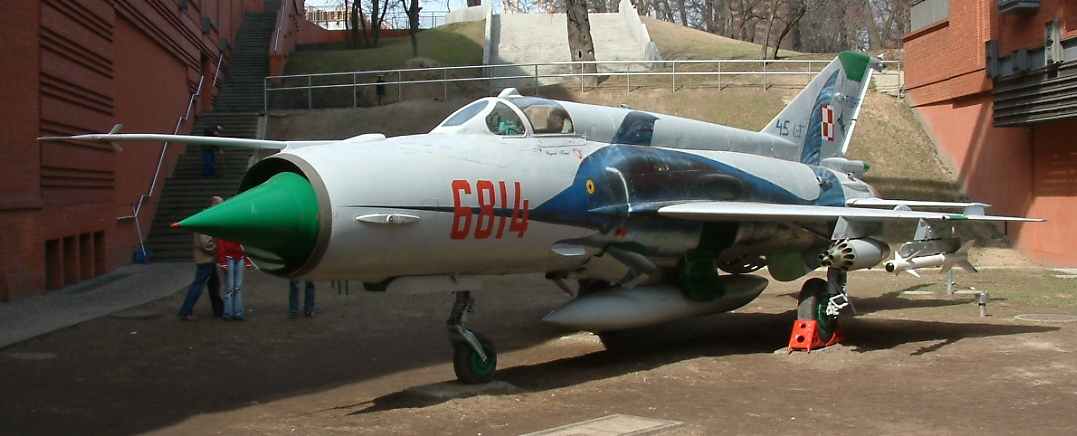
MiG-21MF, Polish Air Force, markings of 3rd Tactical Sqn.

MiG-21MF (1970; Izdeliye 96F; NATO "Fishbed-J")
M = Modernizirovannyy ("Modernised"), F = Forsirovannyy ("Uprated [engine]")

Export version of the MiG-21SM, with RP-22 radar and R13-300 turbojet. The choice of weapons loads was increased with the addition of the R-60 (NATO: AA-8 "Aphid") and later the R-60M IR-seeking AAM. These were also licence-built in India by HAL as the Type 88.

MiG-21MFR (1995)
R = Razuznavatelen ("Reconnaissance")

Bulgarian local designation for MiG-21MF modified to carry recce pods after the retirement of the MiG-21F-13R.

MiG-21MF-75
Unofficial designation used in Bulgaria, East Germany, Romania and Czechoslovakia to refer to MiG-21MF aircraft delivered with cockpit instrumentation identical to that in the MiG-21bis (the "75" refers to "1975", the year in which these entered production.)
MiG-21MFN
Czech Air Force designation for MiG-21MF upgraded with NATO standard avionics.
MiG-21DF (1969)
D = Dal'nomer ("Rangefinder"), F = Forsirovannyy ("Uprated")
A production MiG-21 (S or SM) refitted with R13F2-300 engine and Kvant radar rangefinder for test purposes. Though testing revealed an improvement in manoeuvrability, this variant was not put into production.
MiG-21SMF (1970)
S = Sapfir (referring to the Sapfir-21/RP-22 radar), M = Modernizirovannyy ("Modernised"), F = Forsirovannyy ("Uprated [engine]")

A testbed aircraft – a stock MiG-21SM refitted with the uprated R13F2-300 turbojet. Though a prototype for what would have been a new model, it never entered production.

MiG-21MT (1971; Izdeliye 96T; NATO "Fishbed-J")
M = Modernizirovannyy ("Modernised"), T = Toplivo ("Fuel," referring to increased fuel capacity)

This was a MiG-21MF with increased fuel capacity. Though designed for export, only 15 were built and none were exported.

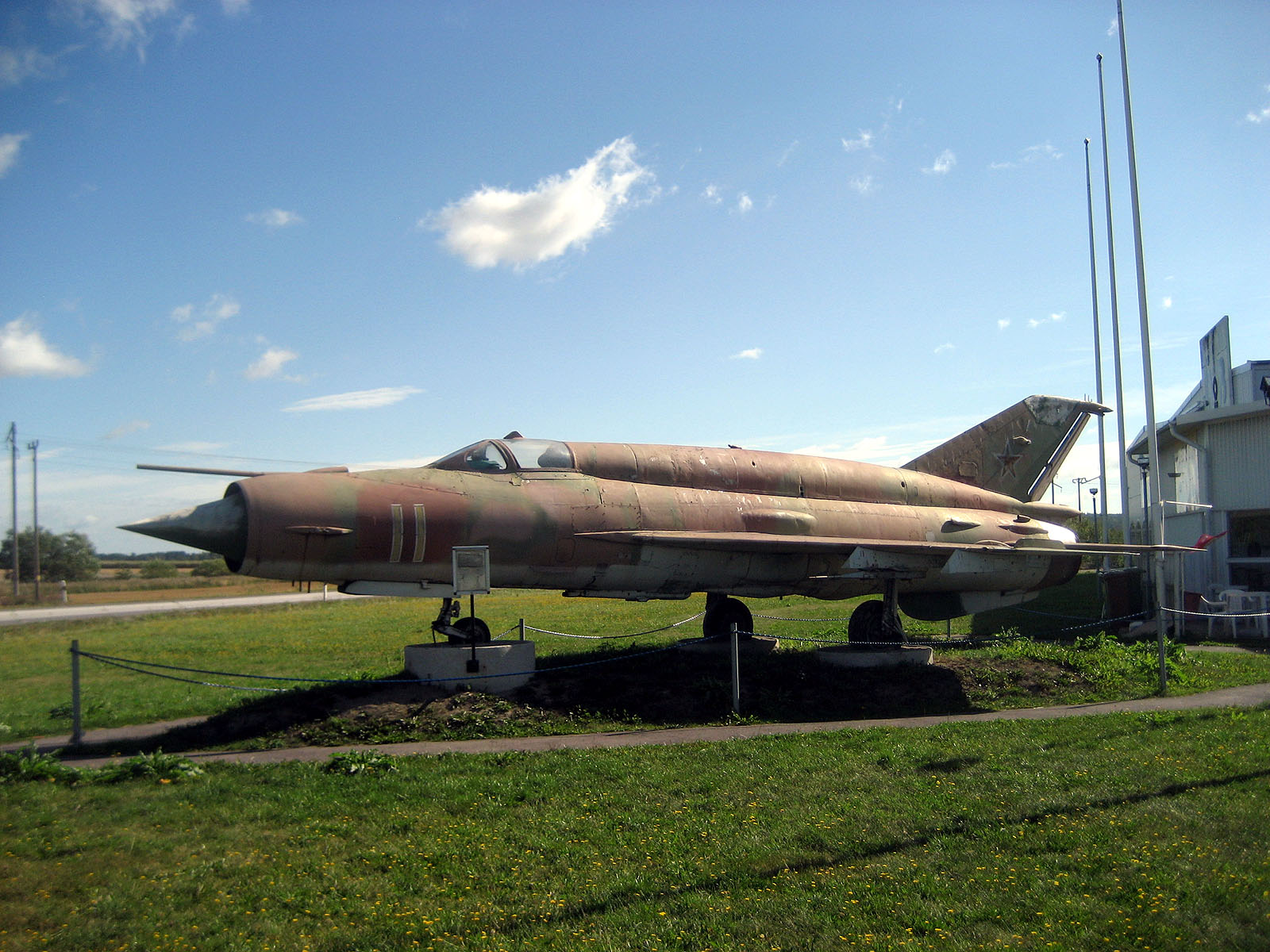
MiG-21SMT of the former Soviet Air Force.

MiG-21SMT (1971; Izdeliye 50; NATO "Fishbed-K")
S = Sapfir (referring to the Sapfir-21/RP-22 radar), M = Modernizirovannyy ("Modernised"), T = Toplivo ("Fuel," referring to increased fuel capacity)

A development of the MiG-21SM with increased fuel capacity. This variant is easily spotted thanks to its larger spine, which made it unpopular with pilots as it was much harder to fly.

MiG-21ST (Izdeliye 50)
S = Sapfir (referring to the Sapfir-21/RP-22 radar), T = Toplivo ("Fuel," referring to increased fuel capacity)

Due to the extreme unpopularity of the MiG-21SMT amongst Soviet pilots, most were rebuilt with the smaller saddle tank of the MiG-21bis after that type entered production in 1972. Following the conversion, they were redesignated MiG-21ST and were externally indistinguishable from the MiG-21bis.

MiG-21bis (1972; Izdeliye 75; NATO "Fishbed-L/N")
The ultimate development of the MiG-21, fitted with the Tumanskiy R25-300 turbojet engine and a great number of other advances over previous types. Those MiG-21bis for the Soviet PVO (Air Defence Force) were equipped with the Lazur GCI system (NATO: "Fishbed-L"), while those for the Soviet Air Force were fitted with the Polyot ILS system (NATO: "Fishbed-N").

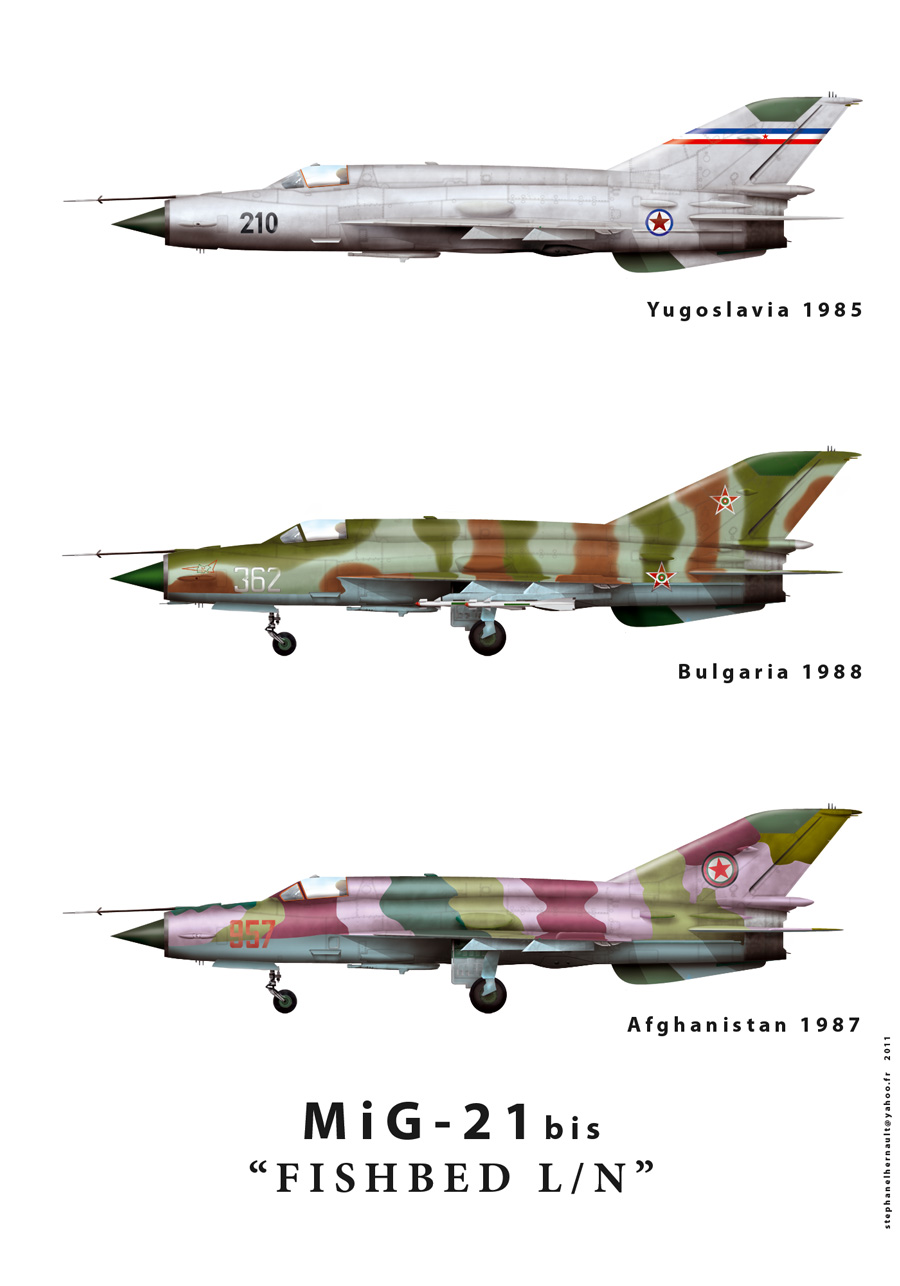
MiG-21 Fishbed-L/N

MiG-21bis (Izdeliye 75A; NATO "Fishbed-L")
Lazur-equipped version with a slightly different avionics package exported to some Warsaw Pact countries. In Bulgaria and East Germany these were designated MiG-21bis-Lazur.
MiG-21bis (Izdeliye 75B; NATO "Fishbed-N")
Polyot-equipped version with a slightly different avionics package exported to some Warsaw Pact countries. In Bulgaria and East Germany these were designated MiG-21bis-SAU (SAU referring to Sistema Avtomaticheskovo Upravleniya = "Automatic Control System"). This variant was manufactured under licence by HAL in India from 1980 to 1987.
MiG-21bis/T
T = Tiedusteluversio ("Reconnaissance Version")

Finnish designation for MiG-21bis modified to carry reconnaissance pods.

MiG-21MGBT
MGBT = Tiedusteluversio ("Reconnaissance Version")

Finnish designation for MiG-21bis upgraded for recon purposes also equipped with RWR and active ECM

=== Trainer variants (1960–1968+) ===
Ye-6U (1960)
Trainer prototype based on the Ye-6T.

Ye-33 (1965)

A Ye-6U prototype was used by two women, N. A. Prokhanova and Lydia Zaitseva to set back-to-back altitude records. Prokhanova set a record of 24,336 m (79,842 ft) – the highest any woman had ever gone – on May 22, 1965, and a month later, Zaitseva set an altitude record for sustained level flight, at 19,020 m (62,401 ft).

MiG-21U (1961; Izdeliye 66-400; NATO "Mongol-A")
U = Uchebnyy ("Training")
Two-seat training version of the MiG-21F-13.

MiG-21U-400

East German designation for MiG-21U aircraft of izdeliye 66-400.

MiG-21UR (1961; project)
U = Uchebnyy ("Training"), R = Razvedchik ("Reconnaissance")

This was an unrealised project based on the Ye-6U in which the rear cockpit was transformed into an extensive camera bay.

MiG-21U (1965; Izdeliye 66-600; NATO "Mongol-B")
Essentially the same as the 66-400, but with the wide-chord vertical stabiliser as on the MiG-21PFM.

MiG-21U-600

East German designation for MiG-21U aircraft of izdeliye 66-600.

MiG-21US (1966; Izdeliye 68; NATO "Mongol-B")
U = Uchebnyy ("Training"), S = Sduv [Pogranichnovo Sloya] ("[Boundary Layer] Blowing")

Two-seat training version; upgrade of MiG-21U 66-400 with blown flaps.
MiG-21US (1966; Izdeliye 68A; NATO Mongol-B")

Export version of MiG-21US with slightly modified avionics.

MiG-21UM (1968; Izdeliye 69; NATO "Mongol-B")
U = Uchebnyy ("Training"), M = Modernizovannyy ("Modernised")

Two-seat training version of the MiG-21MF. Type 69 Indian Air Force designation.

=== Upgrade programmes ===
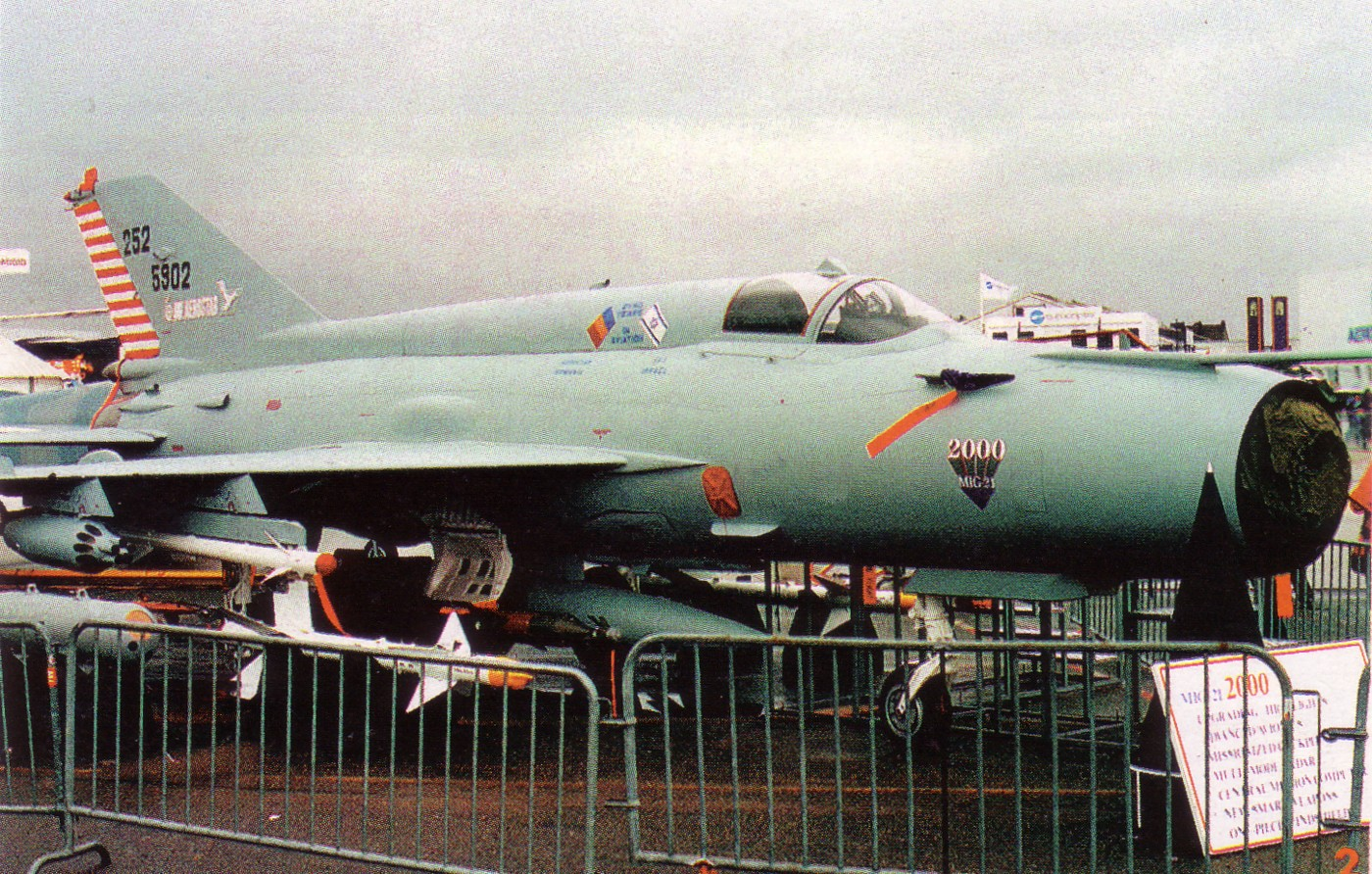
MiG-21 2000

Vought V-601
Proposal by Ling-Temco-Vought to acquire and upgrade MiG-21s for use by United States Navy aggressor squadrons.
MiG-21 2000
Single-seat 21st century version for export buyers. Made by Israel Aerospace Industries.
MiG-21 LanceR

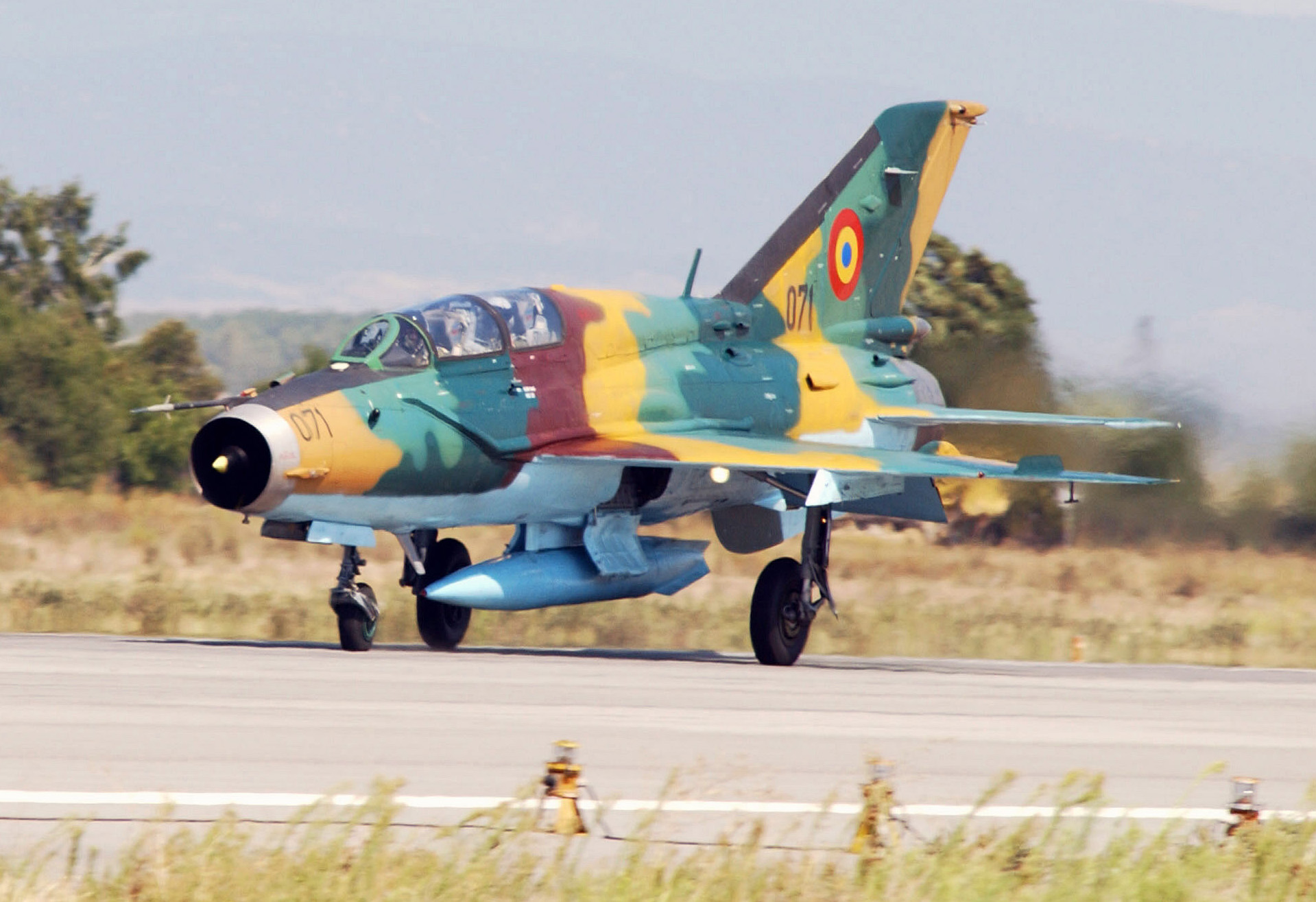
Romanian Air Force MiG-21 LanceR B

Version for the Romanian Air Force upgraded by Elbit Systems of Israel and Aerostar SA of Romania, in 1995–2002. The LanceR A version is optimized for ground attack being able to deliver precision guided munitions of eastern and western origin as well as R-60, R-73 and Python 3 air-to-air missiles. The LanceR B version is the trainer version, and the LanceR C version is the air superiority version featuring 2 LCD MFDs, helmet mounted sight and the Elta EL/M-2032 Air combat radar.

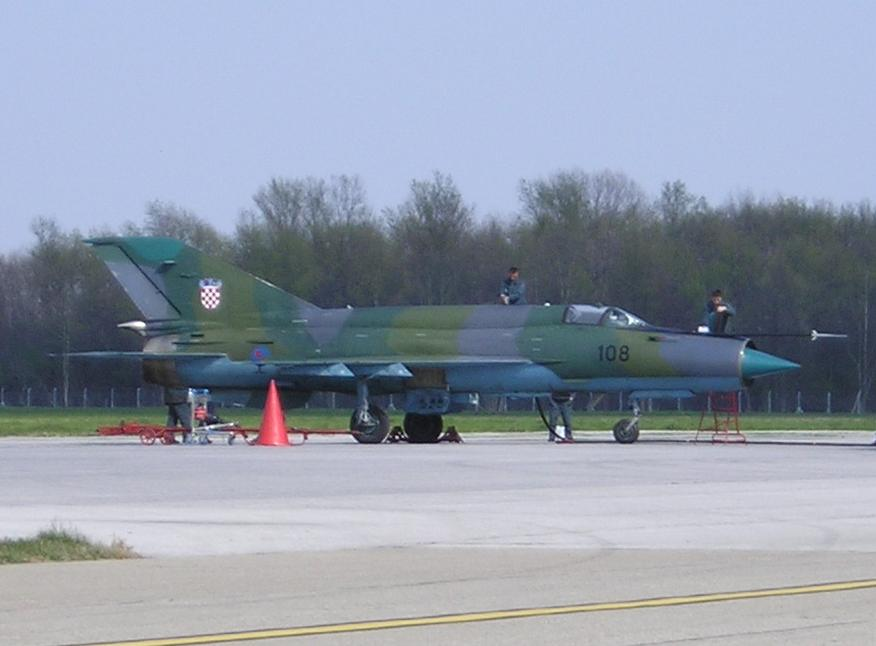
Croatian Air Force MiG-21bis-D

MiG-21bis-D (D = Dorađen ("Upgraded"))
Upgraded in 2003, by Aerostar SA, for the Croatian Air Force with some elements of the LanceR standard. Modernized for NATO interoperability including a Honeywell ILS (VOR/ILS and DME), a GPS receiver, a new IFF system and communications equipment from Rockwell Collins.
MiG-21UMD (D = Dorađen)
Croatian designation for four MiG-21UM upgraded for NATO interoperability, similarly to the MiG-21bis-D.

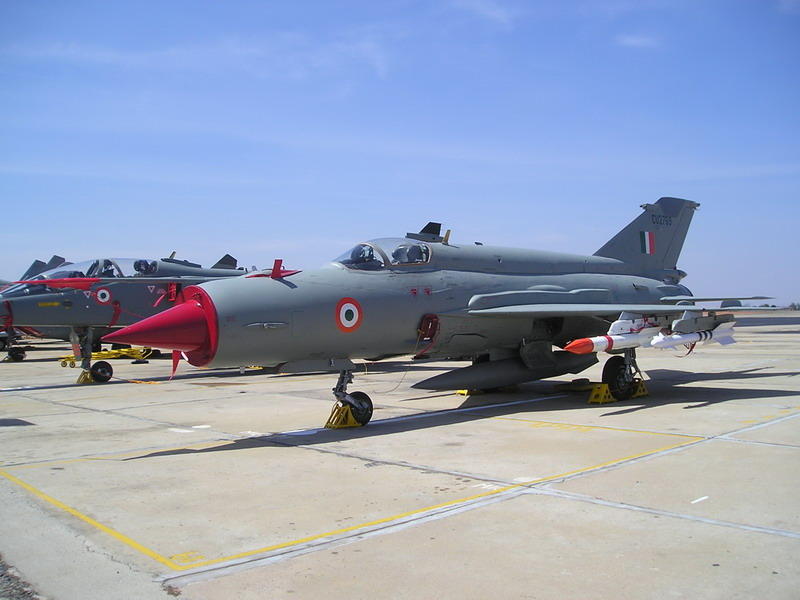
Indian MiG-21UPG

MiG-21-93
MiG-21bis upgrade project, launched in 1991 in cooperation between RSK MiG, the Sokol Aircraft Plant and Phazotron-NIIR. The prototype of this variant first flew on 25 May 1995. This variant was developed into the MiG-21UPG sold to India.
MiG-21UPG
MiG-21bis upgrade program for the Indian Air Force, developed from the MiG-21-93. Modernised aircraft are also known as "MiG-21 Bison". A contract for the upgrade of 125 Indian Air Force aircraft was signed in January 1996, with an option for the upgrade of 50 additional aircraft. While it was originally planned to upgrade at least 30 aircraft at the Sokol Plant in Russia, in May 1998 the contract was modified: only two prototypes would be modernised in Russia, while the 123 remaining aircraft were to be modernised by Hindustan Aeronautics Limited in its Nasik factory. The first two upgraded aircraft were presented in October 1998. The serial phase of the modernisation took place between 2001 and 2008. The modernisation includes an overhaul of the airframe, with a 10-year service life extension. A new drop-shaped canopy with a single-piece windscreen replaces the old one. In the cockpit, a new head-up display is installed, together with a multifunction display. The controls are redesigned to a HOTAS arrangement. A new autopilot is added, as well as an inertial navigation system and GPS receivers. The aircraft are equipped with the Phazotron Kopyo (Spear) radar, developed from the Zhuk and capable of simultaneously tracking eight targets and engaging two of them. The MiG-21UPG upgrade also includes compatibility with new air-to-air weaponry, like the R-27, R-77 and R-73 missiles, the latter of which can be cued to a helmet-mounted sight. Other new weapons include the Kh-31A anti-ship missile and the KAB-500Kr guided bomb. Chaff/flare dispensers are installed on the upper side of the wing root. The old radar warning receiver is replaced by the Indian-developed Tarang, and an internal jammer is added.

=== Foreign-built variants ===
==== China (PRC) ====
Chinese-built variants of the MiG-21 are designated Chengdu J-7 and F-7 (for export). Only the initial version of the J-7 was a copy of a MiG-21 variant, namely the MiG-21F-13. Though an agreement had been reached between China and the USSR for licence production of the MiG-21 in China, political relations soured between the two countries, causing Soviet assistance to stop. The Chinese reverse-engineered parts of the handful of MiG-21F-13s supplied from the USSR, in order to make up for blueprints and documentation that had not yet been shipped over from the USSR at the time of the political rift. All subsequent development of the J-7 was indigenous to China and different from Soviet-made versions. The Guizhou JL-9 trainer, first flown in 2003, is also based on the MiG-21 airframe.

==== Czechoslovakia ====
Between 1962 and 1972 the MiG-21F-13 version was manufactured under license by Aero Vodochody in Czechoslovakia, under the name of Aero S-106. Aero Vodochody (then Středočeské strojírny, n.p.) built a total of 194 planes during this period, under the cover designation article Z-159. It followed the MiG-15 and MiG-19S built in the Vodochody factory from the fifties to sixties. The sole locally built version of the MiG-21F-13 differed externally from the Soviet-built examples by the solid dural sheet fairing behind the cockpit canopy, as opposed to the transparent one on the original Soviet MiGs. These machines were built for the Czechoslovak Air Force and also for export. The R13-300 engines were imported from the Soviet Union.

==== India ====
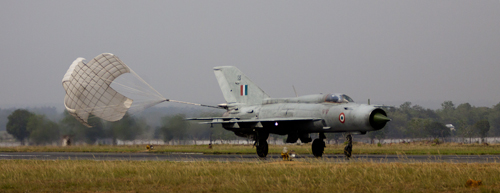
MiG-21 Type 77 of the Indian Air Force landing.

The production of the MiG-21 in India under license by Hindustan Aeronautics in Nasik started with the MiG-21FL in 1966 in four phases starting with the assembly of CKD kits, moving on to subassemblies, parts, and finally advancing to production from scratch. 205 MiG-21FLs, designated Type 77 and nicknamed Trishul ("Trident"), were built in India between 1966 and 1972; the first one built entirely from Indian-made components was delivered to the IAF on 19 October 1970, with the first Indian-made R11F2S-300 powerplant leaving the assembly line on 2 January 1969. In 1971 HAL production was switched to an improved version of the MiG-21M (izdeliye 96), which was designated Type 88 by HAL; as this variant was produced exclusively in India, no izdeliye designation is applicable. The first Type 88 MiG-21M was delivered to the IAF on 14 February 1973 and the last on 12 November 1981, with a total of 158 built. The last variant to be produced by HAL was the MiG-21bis. A total of 75 were built in 1977 from CKD kits, and a further 220 were built from scratch by 1984. Despite a series of crashes during the 1990s, the Indian Air Force has decided to upgrade about 125 of the MiG-21bis in its inventory to the MiG-21UPG standard. Those can serve until 2025. The original MiG-21FL (MiG-21PF or Type 77) was retired in December 2013; remaining MiG-21Ms (Type 88) were scheduled to be retired by 2015.

== Engines ==
The engines used in MiG-21 variants are listed in the table below.

Engines used in MiG-21 variants:
Model	Engine	Thrust – kN (dry/reheat)	Thrust – lbf (dry/reheat)
Ye-2	Mikulin AM-9B	25.5/31.9	5730/7165
Ye-2A/MiG-23 (izd. 63)	Tumansky R-11	37.3/50.0	8380/ 11240
Ye-50	Tumansky RD-9E + Dushkin S-155	25.5/32.4 + 37.3	5730/7275 + 8380
Ye-50A/MiG-23U (izd. 64)	Tumansky R-11E-300 + Dushkin S-155	37.3/50.0 + 37.3	8380/11240 + 8380
Ye-4	Tumansky RD-9E	25.5/32.4	5730/7275
MiG-21 (izd. 65)	Tumansky R-11-300	?/49.0	?/11020
Ye-6	Tumansky R-11F-300	38.3/56.4	8600/ 12680
MiG-21F (izd. 72)	Tumansky R-11F-300	38.3/56.4	8600/ 12680
MiG-21F-13 (izd. 74)	Tumansky R-11F-300	38.3/56.4	8600/ 12680
Ye-6T ("Ye-66")	Tumansky R-11F2-300	36.8/60.7	8258/ 13633
Ye-6T ("Ye-66A")	Tumansky R-11F2-300 + Sevruk S3-20M5A	36.8/60.7 + ?	8258/13633 + ?
Ye-6V	Tumansky R-11F2S-300	38.8/60.6	8710/ 13610
Ye-7 1-2/MiG-21P	Tumansky R-11F-300	38.3/56.4	8600/ 12680
Ye-7 3–4	Tumansky R-11F2-300	38.8/60.0	8710/ 13490
MiG-21PF (izd. 76, 76A)	Tumansky R-11F2-300	38.8/60.0	8710/ 13490
MiG-21FL (izd. 77)	Tumansky R-11F-300	38.3/56.4	8600/ 12680
Ye-7SPS, MiG-21PFS (izd. 94)	Tumansky R-11F2S-300	38.8/60.6	8710/ 13610
MiG-21PFM (izd. 94, 94A)	Tumansky R-11F2S-300	38.8/60.6	8710/ 13610
Ye-7R	Tumansky R-11F2S-300	38.8/60.6	8710/ 13610
MiG-21R (izd. 03, 94R, 94RA)	Tumansky R-11F2S-300	38.8/60.6	8710/ 13610
MiG-21R (94R late)	Tumansky R-13-300	39.9/63.7	8970/ 14320
Ye-7S	Tumansky R-11F2-300	38.8/60.0	8710/ 13490
MiG-21S/SN (izd. 95/95N)	Tumansky R-11F2S-300	38.8/60.6	8710/ 13610
MiG-21M (izd. 96)	Tumansky R-11F2SK-300	38.8/60.6	8710/ 13610
MiG-21SM (izd. 95M/15)	Tumansky R-13-300	39.9/63.7	8970/ 14310
MiG-21MF (izd. 96F)	Tumansky R-13-300	39.9/63.7	8970/ 14310
MiG-21MT/SMT/ST (izd. 96T/50/50)	Tumansky R-13F-300	39.9/63.7	8970/ 14320
MiG-21bis (izd. 75/75A/75B)	Tumansky R-25-300	40.2/69.6 (97.1*)	9040/15650 (21825*)

* = limited (3-minute) "extra-power" reheat at altitudes 4000m (13,120 ft) or less.

== Armament ==
The following table shows the possible ordnance loads of various models of the MiG-21. The number in the pylons column indicates the number of stores carried per pylon.

Armaments of various MiG-21 variants:
Model	Internal Cannon	Center Pylon	Inboard Pylons (per hardpoint)	Outboard Pylons (per hardpoint)
Ye-2	3x NR-30 w 60 rpg	1x UB-16-57 16-tube rocket pod	n/a	n/a
Ye-2A/MiG-23	3x NR-30 w 60 rpg	1x PTB-490 490L drop tank 1x UB-16-57; 1x FAB-250 GP bomb	n/a	n/a
Ye-50A/MiG-23U	2x NR-30 w 60 rpg	n/a	1x ORO-57K 8-tube rocket pod	n/a
Ye-4	3x NR-30 w 60 rpg	1x FAB-250/500 GP bomb 1x UB-16-57; 1x PTB-400 400L drop tank	n/a	n/a
MiG-21	3x NR-30 w 60 rpg	1x FAB-250 GP bomb 2x ORO-57K on special adapter 2x TRS-190 HVAR on twin launcher 1x ARS-212 unguided rocket 1x PTB-400	n/a	n/a
MiG-21F	1st 30: 1x NR-30 + 2x NR-23; Rest: 2x NR-30 w 60 rpg	1x PTB-400	1x S-21 Ovod-M HVAR; 1x S-24 HVAR; 1x OFAB-100-120 HE-Frag bomb 1x FAB-100/250/500; 1x ZB-360 napalm tank	n/a
MiG-21F-13	1x NR-30 w 60 rds	1x PTB-490	1x K-13/R-3S AAM; 1x UB-16-57U; 1x S-24 HVAR; 1x FAB-100/250/500; 1x ZB-360	n/a
MiG-21PF/PFS	n/a	1x PTB-490	1x K-13/R-3S; 1x RS-2-US AAM; 1x UB-16-57U; 1x FAB-100/250	n/a
MiG-21FL	n/a	1x PTB-490	1x K-13/R-3S; 1x UB-16-57U; 1x FAB-100/250	n/a
MiG-21PFM	n/a	1x PTB-490; 1x GP-9 cannon pod w GSh-23-2 w 200 rds	1x K-13/R-3S; 1x RS-2-US; 1x UB-16-57U; 1x FAB-100/250; 1x Kh-66 ASM	n/a
MiG-21R	n/a	1x PTB-490/PTB-800 800L drop tank Type D daylight PHOTINT pod Type N nighttime PHOTINT pod Type R ELINT pod Type T TV pod SPRD-99 JATO booster	1x R-3S; 1x RS-2-US; 1x UB-16-57UM; 1x S-24; 1x FAB-100/250/500/OFAB-100; 1x ZB-500 napalm tank 1x Kh-66	1x PTB-490; 1x UB-16-57UM; 1x FAB-100/250/OFAB-100; 1x S-24
MiG-21S	n/a	1x PTB-490/PTB-800; 1x GP-9 cannon pod 1x SPRD-99	1x R-3R/R-3S; 1x RS-2-US; 1x Kh-66; 1x UB-16-57UM; 1x S-24; 1x FAB-100/250/500/OFAB-100; 1x ZB-500	1x PTB-490; 1x R-3R/R-3S; 1x UB-16-57UM; 1x OFAB-100/FAB-100/250; 1x S-24
MiG-21SN	n/a	1x PTB-490/PTB-800; 1x GP-9 cannon pod 1x SPRD-99; 1x RN-25 tactical nuclear bomb	1x R-3R/R-3S; 1x RS-2-US; 1x Kh-66; 1x UB-16-57UM; 1x S-24; 1x FAB-100/250/500/OFAB-100; 1x ZB-500	1x PTB-490; 1x R-3R/R-3S; 1x UB-16-57UM; 1x OFAB-100/FAB-100/250; 1x S-24
MiG-21M	1x GSh-23-2L w 200 rds	1x PTB-490/PTB-800; 1x SPRD-99	1x R-3S; 1x RS-2-US; 1x Kh-66; 1x UB-16-57U; 1x S-24; 1x FAB-100/250/500/OFAB-100	1x R-3S; 1x RS-2-US; 1x Kh-66; 1x UB-16-57U; 1x S-24; 1x FAB-100/250/500/OFAB-100; 1x PTB-490
MiG-21SM	1x GSh-23-2L w 200 rds	1x PTB-490/PTB-800; 1x SPRD-99	1x R-3S/R-3R; 1x UB-16-57/UB-32; 1x FAB-100/250/500/OFAB-100; 1x ZB-360; 1x Kh-66; 1x S-24	1x R-3S/R-3R; 1x UB-16-57/UB-32; 1x FAB-100/250/500/OFAB-100; 1x ZB-360; 1x Kh-66; 1x S-24; 1x PTB-490
MiG-21MF/MT	1x GSh-23-2L w 200 rds	1x PTB-490/PTB-800; 1x SPRD-99	1x R-3S; 1x Kh-66; 1x UB-16-57U; 1x S-24; 1x FAB-100/250/500/OFAB-100	1x R-3S; 2x R-60 AAM on twin rail 1x Kh-66; 1x UB-16-57U; 1x S-24; 1x FAB-100/250/500/OFAB-100; 1x PTB-490
MiG-21SMT/ST	1x GSh-23-2L w 200 rds	1x PTB-490/PTB-800; 1x SPRD-99	1x R-3S/R-3R; 1x Kh-66; 1x UB-16-57U; 1x S-24; 1x FAB-100/250/500/OFAB-100	1x R-3S/R-3R; 2x R-60 AAM on twin rail 1x Kh-66; 1x UB-16-57U; 1x S-24; 1x FAB-100/250/500/OFAB-100; 1x PTB-490
MiG-21bis	1x GSh-23-2L w 200 rds	1x PTB-490/PTB-800; 1x SPRD-99	1x R-3S/R-3R/R-13M; 1x R-55 AAM; 1x Kh-66; 1x UB-16-57U; 1x S-24; 1x FAB-100/250/500/OFAB-100; 1x UB-32-57U	1x R-3S/R-3R/R-13M; 1x R-55; 2x R-60/R-60M on twin rail 1x Kh-66; 1x UB-16-57U; 1x S-24; 1x FAB-100/250/500/OFAB-100; 1x PTB-490
MiG-21 LanceR	1x GSh-23-2L w 200 rds	1x PTB-490/PTB-800; 1x SPRD-99; 1x LITENING laser designator 1x recce pod	1x R-3S/R-13M; 1x R-73; 1x Python 3; 1x Magic 2; 1x UB-16-57U; 1x S-24; 1x FAB-100/250/500/OFAB-100; 1x Mk82/Mk84	1x R-3S/R-13M; 2x R-60M on twin rail 1x R-73; 1x Python 3; 1x Magic 2; 1x UB-16-57U; 1x S-24; 1x FAB-100/250/500/OFAB-100; 1x PTB-490
MiG-21UPG	1x GSh-23-2L w 200 rds	1x PTB-490/PTB-800; 1x SPRD-99	1x R-3S/R-3R/R-13M; 1x R-27R1 AAM; 1x R-55 AAM; 1x R-73 AAM; 1x R-77 AAM; 1x Kh-25MP ASM; 1x Kh-31A/Kh-31P ASM; 1x Kh-66; 1x UB-16-57U; 1x S-24; 1x FAB-100/250/500/OFAB-100; 1x KAB-500Kr LGB	1x R-3S/R-3R/R-13M; 1x R-27R1; 1x R-55; 1x R-73; 1x R-77; 2x R-60/R-60M on twin rail 1x Kh-25MP; 1x Kh-31A/Kh-31P; 1x Kh-66; 1x UB-16-57U; 1x S-24; 1x FAB-100/250/500/OFAB-100; 1x KAB-500Kr LGB; 1x PTB-490

== Avionics ==
Avionics of MiG-21 variants
Model	Radio	IFF	ADF*	RWR	Gunsight	Radar **	ATC Transponder	GCI Cmd Link	Radionav System
MiG-21 (izd. 65)	RSIU-4V Klyon	SRO-2 Khrom	ARK-5 Amur	SPO-2 Sirena-2	ASP-5N-V3	SRD-1M Konus*	SOD-57 Globus	Gorizont-1V	–
MiG-21F (izd. 72)	R-800	SRO-2 Khrom	ARK-54N	SPO-2 Sirena-2	ASP-5NV-UI	SRD-5MN Baza-6*	SOD-57 Globus	Gorizont-1V?	–
MiG-21F-13 (izd. 74)	R-802	SRO-2 Khrom	ARK-10	SPO-2 Sirena-2	ASP-5ND	SRD-5ND Kvant*	SOD-57M Globus-2	Gorizont-1V?	–
MiG-21PF (izd. 76)	RSIU-5V	SRZO-2 Khrom-Nikel'	ARK-54I	SPO-2 Sirena-2	PKI	RP-9-21 (batch 1–6); RP-21 (7 on)	SOD-57M Globus-2	ARL-S Lazur'	–
MiG-21PF (izd. 76A)	RSIU-5	SRO-2 Khrom	ARK-10*	SPO-2 Sirena-2	PKI	RP-9-21	SOD-57M Globus-2	ARL-S Lazur'	–
MiG-21FL (izd. 77)	RSIU-5G	SRO-1	ARK-10*	SPO-2 Sirena-2	PKI	R1L	SOD-57M Globus-2	?	–
MiG-21PFM (izd. 94)	RSIU-5V	SRZO-2M Khrom-Nikel'	ARK-10	SPO-2 Sirena-2	PKI	RP-21M	SOD-57M Globus-2	ARL-S Lazur'	Iskra
MiG-21PFM (izd. 94A)	RSIU-5	SRZO-2 Khrom-Nikel'	ARK-10*	SPO-2 Sirena-2	PKI	RP-21MA	SOD-57M Globus-2	ARL-S Lazur'	Iskra
MiG-21R (izd. 03/94R)	RSIU-5V	SRZO-2M Khrom-Nikel'	ARK-10	SPO-3 Sirena-3	PKI	RP-21M	SOD-57M Globus-2	ARL-S Lazur'	Iskra
MiG-21R (izd. 94RA)	RSIU-5	SRZO-2 Khrom-Nikel'	ARK-10	SPO-3 Sirena-3	PKI	RP-21MA	SOD-57M Globus-2	ARL-S Lazur'	Iskra
MiG-21S/SN (izd. 95/95N)	RSIU-5V	SRZO-2M Khrom-Nikel'	ARK-10	SPO-10	ASP-PF-21	RP-22 ("Sapfir")	SOD-57M Globus-2	ARL-S Lazur'-M	?
MiG-21M (izd. 96)	RSIU-5	SRZO-2 Khrom-Nikel'	ARK-10	SPO-3 Sirena-3M	ASP-PFD	RP-21MA	SOD-57M Globus-2	ARL-S Lazur'	?
MiG-21SM (izd. 95M/15)	RSIU-5V	SRZO-2M Khrom-Nikel'	ARK-10	SPO-10	ASP-PFD	RP-22	SOD-57M Globus-2	ARL-S Lazur'-M	?
MiG-21bis (PVO; izd. 75)	RSIU-5V	SRZO-2M Khrom-Nikel'	ARK-10	SPO-10	ASP-PFD-M	RP-22M	SOD-57M Globus-2	ARL-S Lazur'-M	none?
MiG-21bis (VVS; izd. 75)	RSIU-5V	SRZO-2M Khrom-Nikel'	ARK-10	SPO-10	ASP-PFD-M	RP-22M	SOD-57M Globus-2	none	RSBN-4N
MiG-21bis (izd. 75A)	RSIU-5	SRZO-2 Khrom-Nikel'	ARK-10	SPO-3 Sirena-3M	ASP-PFD	RP-21M	SOD-57M Globus-2	ARL-S Lazur'-M	none?
MiG-21bis (izd. 75B)	RSIU-5	SRZO-2 Khrom-Nikel'	ARK-10	SPO-3 Sirena-3M	ASP-PFD	RP-21M	SOD-57M Globus-2	none	RSBN-2N

Notes to table: * ADF = Automatic direction finder; an asterisk by the name means there is no DME module present. ** = An asterisk by the name indicates a rangefinding-only unit.

General Specifications of MiG-21 variants are listed below:-

== Specifications (Mikoyan-Gurevich MiG-21PFM) ==
Data from

General characteristics

- Crew: 1
- Length: 14.5 m (47 ft 6.86 in) (with pitot)
- Wingspan: 7.154 m (23 ft 5.66 in)
- Height: 4.125 m (13 ft 6.41 in)
- Wing area: 23.0 m^{2} (247.3 sq ft)
- Gross weight: 7,800 kg (17,195 lb)
- Powerplant: 1 × Tumanskiy R11F2S-300 , 38.74 kN (8,710 lbf) thrust dry, 60.54 kN (13,610 lbf) with afterburner

Performance

- Maximum speed: 2,175 km/h (1,385 mph, 1,204 kn)
- Maximum speed: Mach 2.05
- Range: 1,670 km (1,037 mi, 901 nmi)
- Service ceiling: 19,000 m (62,335 ft)

Armament

- 1x GP-9 cannon pod with 23 mm GSh-23 cannon, plus
- 2x K-13A (R-3S) AAM or
- 2x 500 kg (1,102 lbs) of bombs

== Specifications (Mikoyan-Gurevich MiG-21bis) ==
Data from

General characteristics

- Crew: 1
- Length: 15.0 m (49 ft 2.5 in) (with pitot)
- Wingspan: 7.154 m (23 ft 5.66 in)
- Height: 4.125 m (13 ft 6.41 in)
- Wing area: 23.0 m^{2} (247.3 sq ft)
- Empty weight: 5,339 kg (11,770 lb)
- Gross weight: 8,725 kg (19,235 lb)
- Powerplant: 1 × Tumanskiy R25-300 , 40.21 kN (9,040 lbf) thrust dry, 69.62 kN (15,650 lbf) with afterburner

Performance

- Maximum speed: 2,237 km/h (1,468 mph, 1,276 kn)
- Maximum speed: Mach 2.05
- Range: 1,210 km (751 mi, 653 nmi) (internal fuel)
- Service ceiling: 17,800 m (58,400 ft)
- Rate of climb: 225 m/s (44,280 ft/min)

Armament

- 1x internal 23 mm GSh-23 cannon with 250 rounds
- 4x K-13A/M or 6x Molniya R-60 AAM or 4x R-3R SARH AAM
- 2x 500 kg (1,102 lb) bombs

== Specifications (Mikoyan-Gurevich MiG-21-93) ==
Data from

General characteristics

- Crew: 1
- Length: 14.5 m (47 ft 6.86 in) (with pitot)
- Wingspan: 7.154 m (23 ft 5.66 in)
- Height: 4.125 m (13 ft 6.41 in)
- Wing area: 23.0 m^{2} (247.3 sq ft)
- Gross weight: 8,825 kg (19,425 lb)
- Powerplant: 1 × Tumanskiy R25-300 , 40.21 kN (9,040 lbf) thrust dry, 69.62 kN (15,650 lbf) with afterburner

Performance

- Maximum speed: 2,228 km/h (1,468 mph, 1,276 kn)
- Maximum speed: Mach 2.05
- Range: 1,210 km (751 mi, 653 nmi) (internal fuel)
- Service ceiling: 17,800 m (58,400 ft)
- Rate of climb: 225 m/s (44,280 ft/min)

Armament

- 1x internal 23 mm GSh-23 cannon, plus
- 2x R-27R1 or R-27T or 4x Vympel R-77 or 4x R-60M or R-73E AAM or
- 2x 500 kg (1,102 lbs) bombs

== See also ==
- List of Chengdu J-7 variants

== Bibliography ==
- Anderton, David A. (1987). North American F-100 Super Sabre. Oxford, UK: Osprey Publishing Limited. ISBN 0-85045-662-2.
- Boniface, Roger (2005). Fighter Pilots of North Vietnam: An Account of their Combats 1965 to 1975. Gamlingay, Sandy, UK: Authors On Line. ISBN 978-0-7552-0203-4.
- Butowski, Piotr (June 1995). "Un MiG-21 inconnu" [An Unknown MiG-21]. Le Fana de l'Aviation (in French) (305): 40–42. ISSN 0757-4169.
- Gordon, Yefim (2001). Mikoyan-Gurevich MiG-15: The Soviet Union's Long-Lived Korean War Fighter. Hinckley: Midland. ISBN 1-85780-105-9.
- Gordon, Yefim; Dexter, Keith; Komissarov, Dmitriy (2008). Mikoyan MiG-21. Famous Russian Aircraft. Hinckley, UK: Midland Publishing. ISBN 978-1-85780-257-3.
- Herzog, Chaim (1975). The War of Atonement. Boston: Little Brown and Company. ISBN 0-316-35900-9.
- Michel III, Marshall L. (2007) [1997]. Clashes; Air Combat Over North Vietnam 1965–1972. Annapolis, MD: Naval Institute Press. ISBN 1-59114-519-8.
- Michel III, Marshall L. (2002). The 11 Days of Christmas. New York: Encounter Books. ISBN 1-893554-27-9.
- Pollack, Kenneth M. (2004). Arabs at War: Military Effectiveness, 1948–1991. London: Bison Books. ISBN 0-8032-8783-6.
- Spick, Mike (March–May 1992). "Turkey or Thoroughbred?". Air Enthusiast. No. 45. pp. 24–35. ISSN 0143-5450.
- Toperczer, István (2001). MiG-21 Units of the Vietnam War. Osprey Combat Aircraft. Oxford: Osprey Publishing. ISBN 1-84176-263-6.
