= Dushkin =

Dushkin (masculine, Russian: Душкин) or Dushkina (feminine, Russian: Душкина) is a Russian surname. Notable people with the surname include:

- Alexey Dushkin (1904–1977), Soviet architect
- Leonid Dushkin (1910–1990), Soviet rocket scientist
  - Dushkin S-155, rocket motor designed by Leonid Dushkin
- Samuel Dushkin (1891–1976), American violinist and composer
