= RP-21 Sapfir =

Soviet airplane radar system

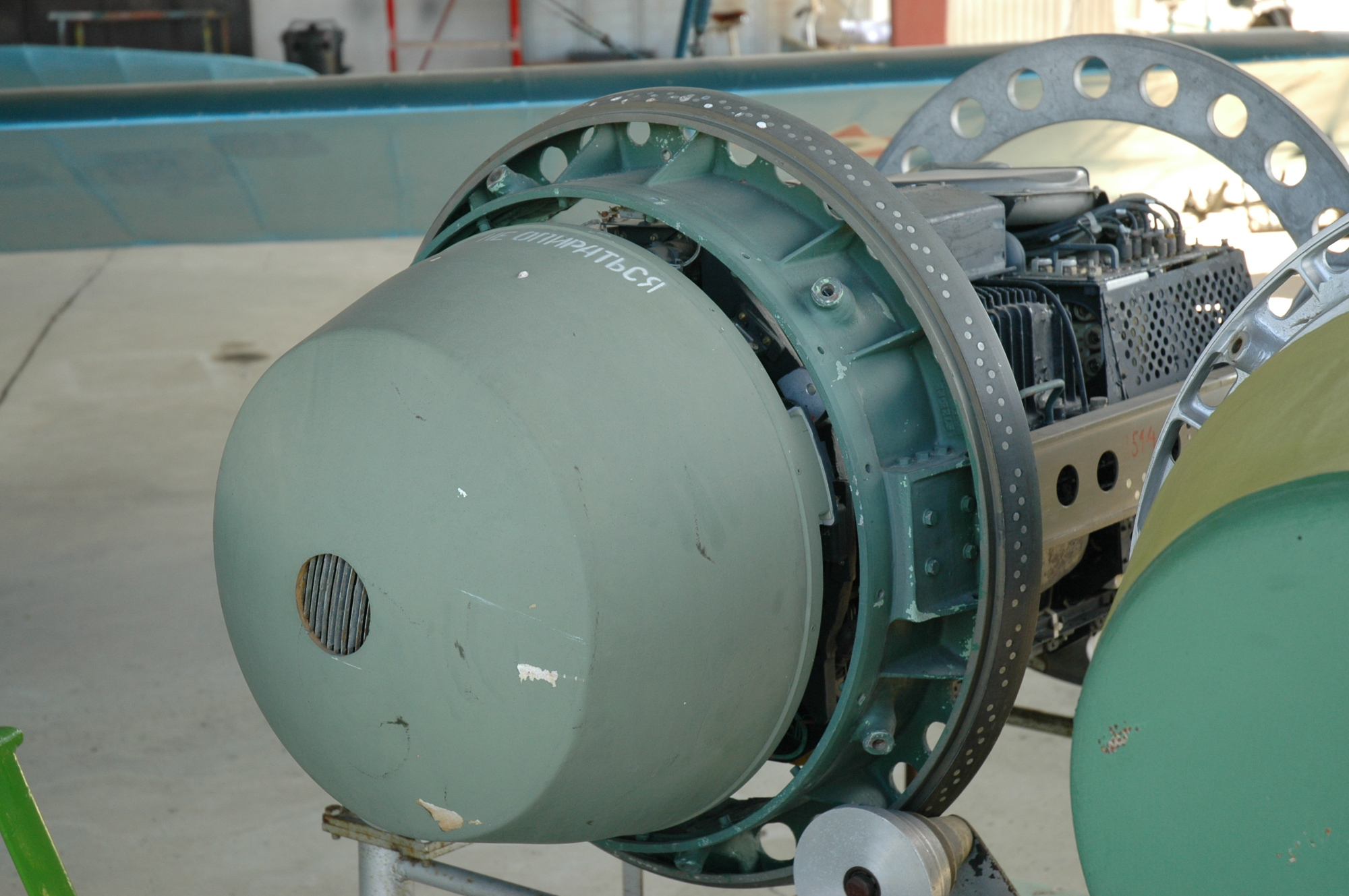
Front view of RP-21MA radar

The TsD-30 / RP-21 (NATO codename: Spin Scan) was a radar system developed by the Soviet Union for use in the updated MiG-21PF fighter, and used in later versions of the MiG-21.

The early MiG-21 fighter variants, MiG-21F and MiG-21F-13, were clear-weather daylight-only fighters. Although they were in use with the Soviet Air Force Frontal Aviation (VVS FA), due to their limitations, they were unsuited for the interception tasks of the Soviet Air Defence Forces (PVO). The Mikoyan OKB started development of a more sophisticated interceptor, based on the MiG-21F-13 in the late 1950s. The MiG-21P and MiG-21PF were the first MiG-21s to be equipped with a real radar that would enable them to search, track and intercept targets by night and in foul weather: the TsD-30 / RP-21 radar, which was given the NATO codename of "Spin Scan-A."

The TsD-30 / RP-21 replaced the MiG-21F-13's SRD-5M Kvantum ('Quantum') ranging- and gun-radar. RP-21 featured a mechanically steered and gyroscopic stabilised radar dish, and had a thermionic valve (vacuum tube) circuit. In theory it was able to detect fighter-sized targets from a range of 20 km, and lock on to them at a range of 10 km, though in practice this range reduced to 13 km and 7 km respectively. The associated weapon was the Vympel K-13 infrared guided air-to-air missile, also known as R-3S, object 310 or AA-2 "Atoll-A" by NATO, already in use with the older SRD-5M radar. Later on, newer versions of the aircraft (namely, MiG-21PFS) used the further upgraded RP-21M radar (NATO codename "Spin Scan-B"), which allowed the semi-active radar homing (SARH) missile, the new R-3R (NATO codename AA-2 "Atoll-B").

Though it was a great improvement over the older SRD-5M, the new intercepting capabilities were still limited, mostly due to an inherent design flaw of the MiG-21: the nose inlet limited the size of the small radar cone, so the radar field was limited to 20° vertically and 60° horizontally. Even in the latest Chinese F-7MG copies of the MiG-21 (equipped with more advanced Israeli and Italian radars) this is still said to be a significant limiting factor for radar use. Also, because of the vacuum tube electronics, the radar system (like most other early generation radars) had a low mean time between failures (MTBF). The radar lacked look-down/shoot-down capabilities (though this was not at all a common feature of radar systems at the time), meaning that it couldn't intercept targets that were flying under the MiG-21, because the radar system was unable to filter out "ground clutter" return. Another disadvantage of the new radar (and other avionics) was the weight increase in the MiG-21 PF, which reduced the baseline MiG-21's otherwise impressive flight characteristics.

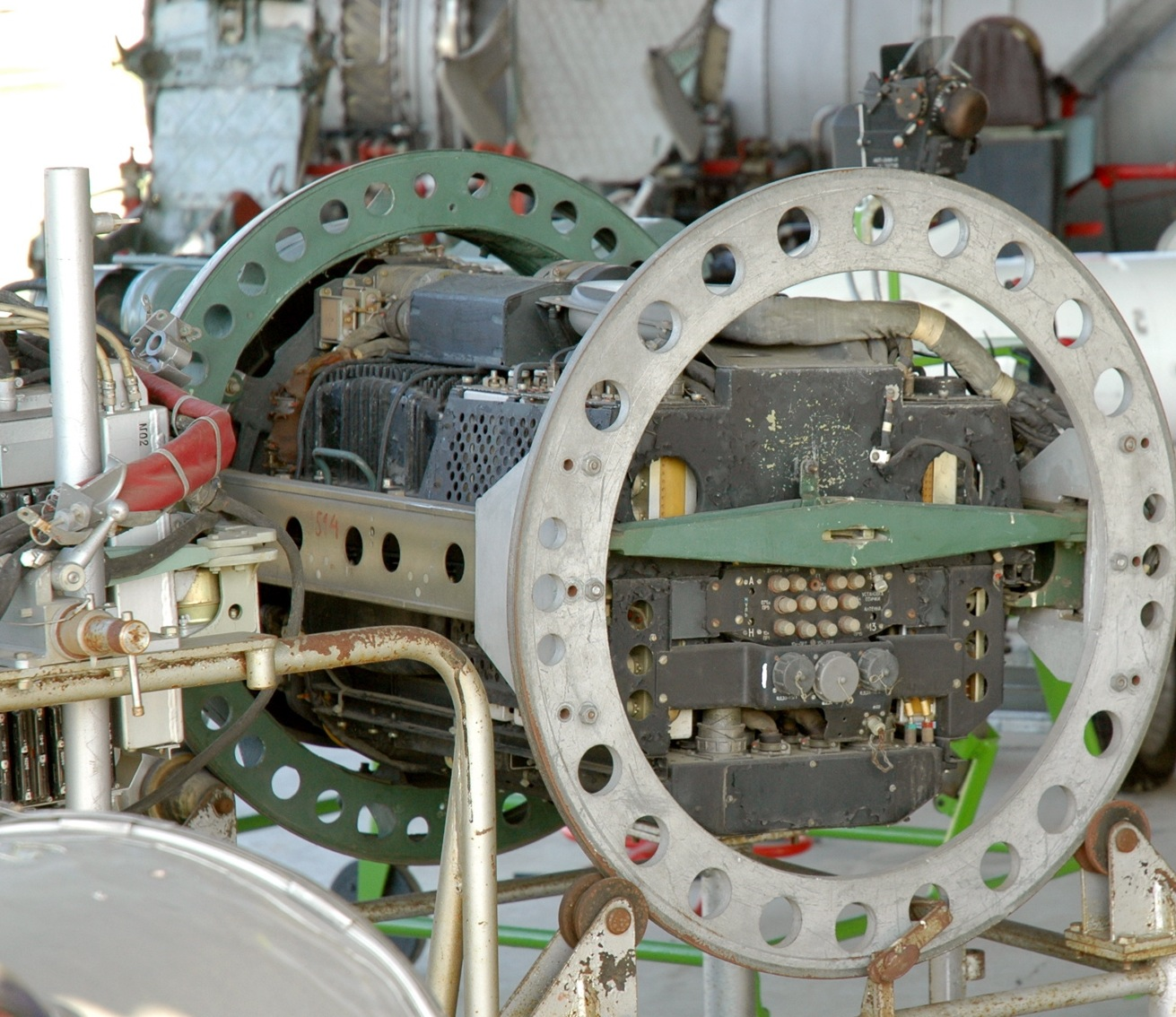
Rear view of RP-21MA

The radar was simple to use and repair, and, because of vacuum tube technology, was able to withstand a powerful electro-magnetic pulse (EMP), a side-effect from nuclear explosion, radiation harmless to humans but very damaging to modern solid state (silicon transistor) electronics. Its capabilities, as limited as they may seem, were offset by the standard PVO doctrine: pilots were tied to a ground-controlled interception (GCI) system, which, through ground-based radars and data links, provided interceptors more extensive and more precise information.

Over the years, the West became more acquainted with the TsD-30 / RP-21 during the Vietnam War in Indochina, and during the Six-Day and the Yom Kippur Wars in the Middle East. Its combat record is not impressive, mostly due to the primitive and overestimated early generation R-3R radar guided missiles. Also, the radar was rather quickly compromised because of defections, and its weaknesses were well known to the West, giving way to the creation of effective electronic countermeasures (ECM). Western pilots learned to distinguish the RP-21's rhythmic three-tone pulse.

Still, the RP-21 and the later RP-22 Sapfir 21 radar (NATO codename "Jay Bird") of the later MiG-21bis series, had a long career and the latter was even used for export purposes in downgraded MiG-23S and MiG-23MS interceptors.

== Sources ==
- fr:MiG-21
- Article title
- Various written sources regarding radar technology, e.g., combat aircraft
