= Dushkin S-155 =

Soviet aircraft rocket engine

S-155
- Country of origin: Soviet Union
- Manufacturer: Dushkin OKB
- Application: Booster rocket for aircraft

Liquid-fuel engine
- Propellant: AK-20 (nitric acid) / TG-02
- Cycle: Gas-generator

Performance
- Thrust, sea-level: 37.3 kN (8380 lbf)

Dimensions
- Dry mass: 500 kg (1,100 lb)

The Dushkin S-155 was a liquid-fueled rocket motor designed by Leonid Dushkin specifically for use in the Mikoyan-Gurevich Ye-50 and Ye-50A (a.k.a. MiG-23U) experimental-developmental aircraft in the 1950s. It delivered 37.3 kN (8380 lbf) and ran on a mix of TG-02 hypergolic amine fuel and AK-20 oxidizer (nitric acid). The fuel pumps were powered with grade T hydrogen peroxide.
