= Sergey Tumansky =

Soviet aeronautical engineer and engine designer

Sergei Konstantinovich Tumansky
- Born: Сергей Константинович Туманский; 21 May [O.S. 8 May] 1901; Minsk, Russian Empire
- Died: September 9, 1973 (aged 72); Moscow, Soviet Union
- Occupations: Chief Designer, General Designer of OKB-300
- Known for: Aircraft and Rocket Engine designs
- Awards: Hero of Socialist Labour

Sergei Konstantinovich Tumansky (Russian: Серге́й Константинович Туманский; 21 May [O.S. 8 May] 1901 – 9 September 1973) was a designer of Soviet aircraft engines and the chief designer in the Tumansky Design Bureau, OKB-300. He worked in TsIAM (1931–38 and in 1940), and at the aircraft-engine plant N 29, in Zaporozhye.

He also worked as a substitute main designer in OKB A.A. Mikulin beginning in 1943.

== Biography ==
Sergei Tumansky was born in Minsk, the Russian Empire, on May 21, 1901 and died, at age 73, in Moscow, the Soviet Union, on September 9, 1973. He studied at the Vladimir school until joining the Red Army in 1918 where he took part in air operations on both fronts. In 1919 Sergey graduated from radio engineering school and served as a technician at the Petrogradskaya Military Technical School starting in 1921. 1927 saw Tumansky enter the Zhukovsky Air Force Engineering Academy where he worked with other engineers (Ponomarev, Fedorov, & Zenichkin) to develop the Tufsen aircraft engine, for which they were awarded the first place price for creativity in design. In 1931 he took a position as senior engineer at the Baranov Central Institute of Aviation Motor Development, spending his time there engaged in aircraft engine construction and research, until being appointed as the chief designer at Aircraft Plant #29 in Zaporozhye in 1938, where the Tumansky M-87 engine was developed under his supervision. In 1939 this plant developed the Tumansky M-88 used on the Ilyushin Il-4 bomber. Aleksandr Mikulin invited Tumansky to work at Plant #300 in 1943 as Deputy Chief Designer, which he worked at for the next 30 years, developing the multiple piston and jet engines, including the Tumansky R-11 which powered the Mikoyan-Gurevich MiG-21. After Mikulin's removal in 1956, Sergey was appointed as the General Constructor of the bureau, which has been renamed OKB-300. Tumansky also served as a General Designer at the Soyuz Joint Experimental Plant.

Around 1962 the Soyuz Joint Experimental Plant began development of liquid rocket motors to stabilize and orient spacecraft. That same year Alexander Yakovlev proposed that OKB-300 create an engine for vertical take off in aircraft. Tumansky and his engineers modified an existing engine into the Tumansky R-27-300 which was installed on a Yakovlev Yak-36. At the Domodedovo Aviation Parade in July, 1967, a demonstration was made of the new engine's VTOL capability. Further developments in this area led to the creation of the Yakovlev Yak-38, which was fitted with a Tumansky R-27V-300 and two Rybinsk RD-36-35F engines.

Tumansky was a specialist in the field of mechanics and machine building. He was a corresponding member of the Soviet Academy of Sciences for the department of mechanics and control processes from 26 June 1964, and then academician for the department of mechanics and control processes (machine building) from 26 November 1968. He was awarded different distinctions, among them Lenin Prize, Lenin Order and Hero of Socialist Labour. Sergei Konstantinovich Tumansky died on 9 September 1973 in Moscow, and was buried at the Novodevichy cemetery.

== Contributions ==
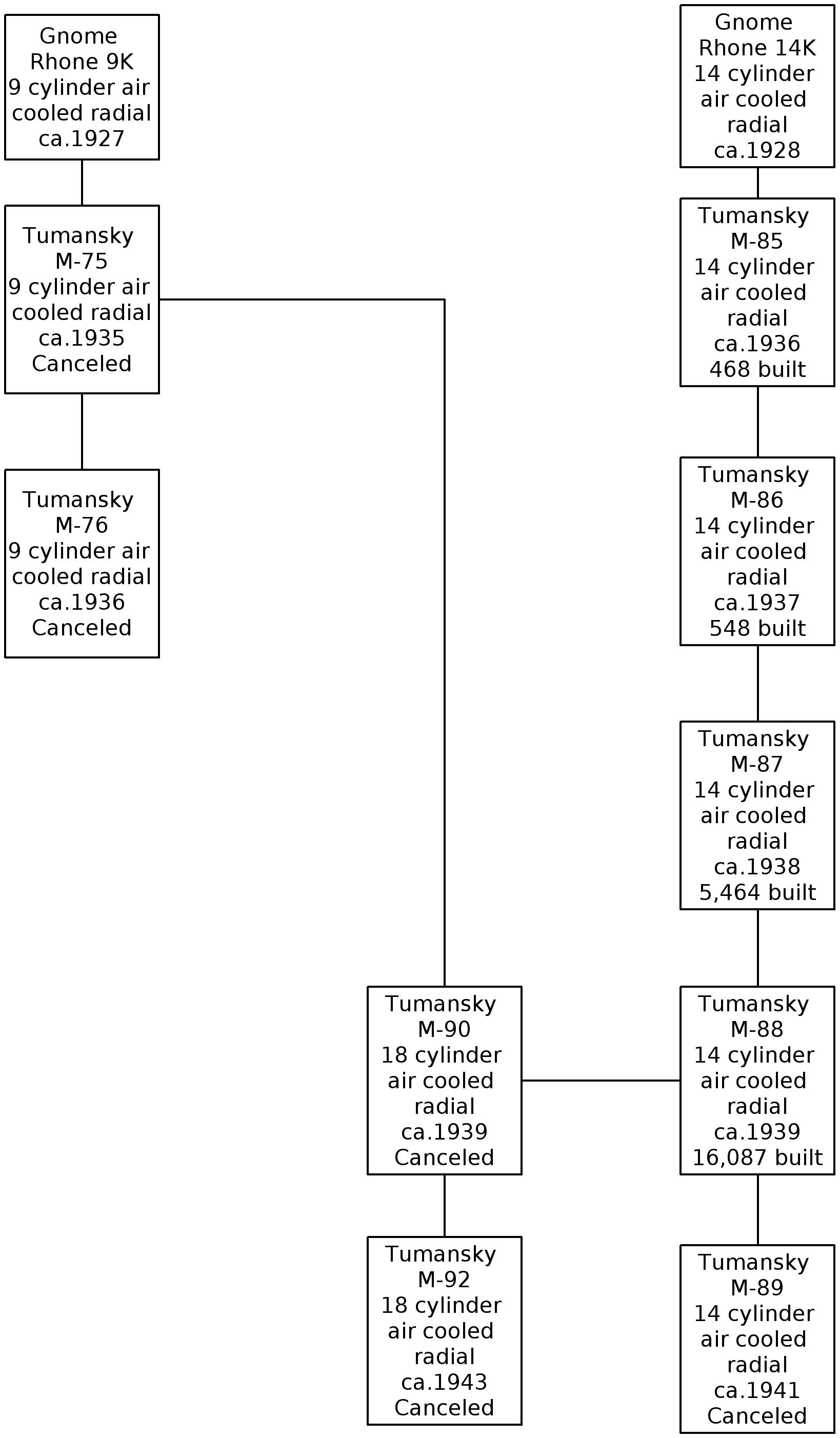
Family tree of Tumansky engines

Some of the engines he worked on and/or designed include:

- M-75 - Gnome-Rhône 9K Mistral built under license
- M-85 - Gnome-Rhône 14K Mistral Major built under license
- M-86 - higher power version of M-85 with increased supercharging and a higher compression ratio
- Tumansky M-87 - improved M-86 with more power
- Tumansky M-88 - improved M-87 with more power
- Tumansky M-89
- Tumansky M-90 - prototype two-row, 18 cylinder version of M-75; cancelled in 1944 as it was too underpowered and suffered numerous failures
- Tumansky M-92 - prototype development of M-90, 1943
- Tumansky RD-9 - initially known as Mikulin AM-5, renamed to RD-9 when Tumansky took over development
- Tumansky RD-10 - designation given to captured examples and copies of the Junkers Jumo 004
- Tumansky R-11 - a twin-spool, axial-flow non-afterburning turbojet engine
- Tumansky R-13 - a twin-spool, axial-flow afterburning turbojet engine designed by Sergei Alekseevich Gavrilov, developed from the R-11
- Tumansky R-15 - an axial-flow, single shaft afterburning turbojet
- Tumansky R-21 - projected twin-spool, axial-flow afterburning turbojet based on the R-11
- Tumansky R-25 - a twin-spool, axial-flow afterburning turbojet engine, the ultimate development of the Tumansky R-11
- Tumansky R-29

== Awards ==
- Hero of Socialist Labour (1957)
- Lenin Prize winner (1957)
- Gospremii of the USSR (1946)
- Honorary Citizen Kuybyshev (1982)
- Order of Lenin (4 times)
- Order of the October Revolution
- Order of the Red Star

== See also ==
- Nikolai Dmitriyevich Kuznetsov
