= Yakovlev Yak-201 =

Russian VTOL fighter project

Yak-201

General information
- Type: Fifth generation stealth VTOL fighter
- National origin: Russia
- Manufacturer: Yakovlev
- Status: Project only
- Primary user: Russian Navy
- Number built: 0

History
- Developed from: Yakovlev Yak-43

The Yakovlev Yak-201 was a planned Russian takeoff and landing stealth fighter/interceptor aircraft for the Russian Navy, as a follow-up to the Yak-141 and Yak-43 aircraft. The design was carried out in the mid-1990s Yakovlev Design Bureau. The project was cancelled and no prototype was built due to a lack of funds and interest by the Russian Ministry of Defense.

== Development ==
The design was started on an initiative basis by the Yakovlev bureau officers in the mid-1990s to allow the Russian Navy aircraft carriers to operate state-of-the-art vertical takeoff and landing aircraft.

After the Yak-141 and Yak-43 were developed, the engineers from the Yakovlev Design Bureau proceeded to the Yak-201.

In 1996–1997, the aircraft was offered to the customer, but the project remained unclaimed, primarily for financial reasons, and also due to the lack of certainty of the Russian Ministry of Defense under the LFI program. No full size mock-up nor prototype were built.

On 23 November 2017, it was reported that Yakovlev would be the designer to build a vertical takeoff and landing aircraft to be used on the future Russian aircraft carrier, such as the Project 2300 Shtorm or Project 11430E Lamantin carrier proposals. It may or may not be based on the Yak-201. Yakolvev might built a new vertical takeoff and landing fighter for the two 44,000-ton Project 23900 Ivan Rogov amphibious assault ships currently under construction.

== Design ==
The aircraft was supposed to differ from Yak-141 / Yak-43 by an increased range, a single engine and stealth characteristics. The aircraft is made according to the traditional scheme with two-tails, and a large angle of inclination. The plane is relatively stealthy, as it is made unobtrusive with few right angles. According to preliminary data from the bureau, the interceptor fighter was supposed to have only one pilot.

The design was for a single lift-propulsion motor with a mechanical drive to a lifting fan installed behind the cockpit. The nozzle of the main engine was supposed to be vectorable. Flat and round nozzle options were considered. The ability to change the thrust vector makes the aircraft supermanoeuvrable. The armament was to be placed in an internal weapon bay inside the fuselage.

The aircraft was expected to reach a speed of 1,250 km/h near the ground, and 1,800 km/h at altitude. The practical ceiling for the Yak-201 is 15,000 m. Among the armament, it was decided to use a GSh-301 rifle cannon with 120 rounds of ammunition, and to install air-to-air type R-77 long-range or medium-range at four points of suspension. The installation of short-range missiles R-73 and R-60 and NAR units with a caliber of up to 240 mm were worked out.

== Specifications (Yak-201) ==
General characteristics

- Crew: 1
- Length: 19 m (62 ft 4 in)
- Wingspan: 11.7 m (38 ft 5 in)
- Height: 4.2 m (13 ft 9 in)
- Powerplant: 1 × Saturn AL-31?

Performance

- Maximum speed: Mach 1.45 at altitude (1800 km/h)
- Cruise speed: 1,250 km/h (780 mph, 670 kn)
- Service ceiling: 18,000 m (59,000 ft)

Armament

- Guns: 1 × GSh-301 autocannon
- Missiles:
  - RVV-MD
  - R-73
  - R-60

== See also ==
Related development

- Yakovlev Yak-43
- Yakovlev Yak-141
- Yakovlev Yak-38

Aircraft of comparable role, configuration, and era

- Lockheed Martin F-35B
- British Aerospace Sea Harrier

Related lists

- List of fighter aircraft
