= Tumansky R-79V-300 =

Soviet turbofan engine

R-79V-300
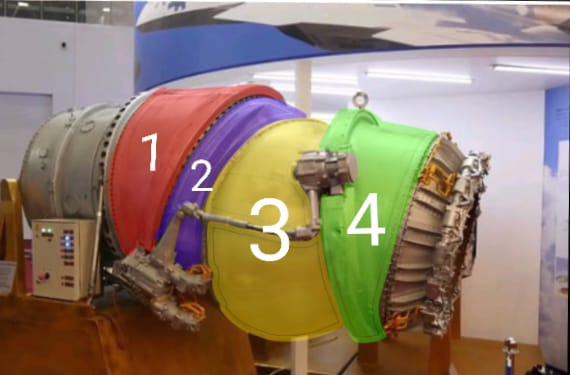
- The engine, divided by sections
- Type: Turbofan
- National origin: Soviet Union, Russia
- Manufacturer: AMNTK Soyuz
- First run: 1984
- Major applications: Yakovlev Yak-141
- Number built: 26 (including 16 flight-worthy engines)

The Tumansky R-79V-300. is an afterburning turbofan developed by NPO Soyuz in the Soviet Union, now AMNTK Soyuz in Russia. The R-79 is a vectored-thrust afterburning turbofan used as powerplant for the supersonic Yak-141 vertical takeoff/landing (VTOL) fighter aircraft designed by Yakovlev to replace the Yak-38

== Design and development ==
The development of the R-79 began in the late 1970 under the direction of V.K. Kobchenko with development project designation Izdeliye 79 ('Product 79'). The design and development of the R-79V-300 was driven by the requirement of designing a power plant for a supersonic V/STOL aircraft working alongside two lift engines (RD-41). Unlike its predecessor, the thrust-vectored non-afterburning turbofan Tumansky R-27 used in the Yak-38, the R-79 single exhaust design combined with a three-joints ring swivel nozzle made possible an afterburner turbofan capable of operate in any nozzle position.

The R-79V-300 used in the Yak-141 is a two-shaft axial-flow afterburning turbofan with counter-rotating spools to reduce weight and gyroscopic forces on the engine. The engine has a three-stage low-pressure compressor (fan) and an eleven-stage high-pressure compressor, with bleed air from after the 6th stage for roll control. Both compressors are driven by a pair of counter-rotating 2-stage turbines. However the bleed air for roll control, up to 10 kg/s taken from the core will reduce the thrust. Paired with two RD-41 (4.1 kN, 4,260 kgf) they totals a thrust in hovering mode of 20,500 kgf (45,194.8 lbf) at ISA conditions.

Ground testing, production and test flights extended from 1983 to 1991 when the Yak-141 was cancelled.

=== Further developments ===
During the 1990s Soyuz developed an alternative rectangular nozzle for vector control in the pitch axis, replaced the analogue electronic engine controller with a FADEC and increased thrust. Nevertheless, this improved version and a non-augmented R-79V-300 variant designated VK-21 have no reported application. In the early 2000s AMNTK Soyuz developed a 30 MW gas turbine using the core and turbines of the R-79V-300 replacing the low pressure compressor and adding a 5-stage power turbine developed by JSC Kuznetsov.

== Variants ==
R-79V-300
With a 3-wedge ring swivel nozzle capable of 0 – 95º vector control with full afterburner. 152 kN (34,000 lbf) thrust
R-79M (R179-300)
Improved version with higher maximum thrust, FADEC and new rectangular nozzle that enable a control of ±20° in the pitch axis. 176–200 kN (40,000–45,000 lb_{f}) thrust.
R-579SPS-300

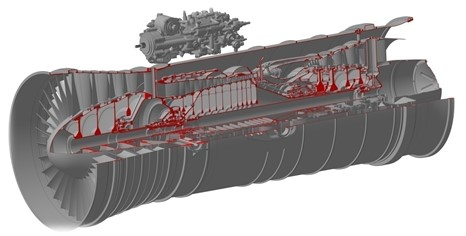
R-579SPS-300

Improved engine presented at 2021 MAKS.
VK-21
Proposed non-augmented version of the R-79V-300. 110.8 kN (24,900 lb_{f}) of thrust.
GTE-30-300
Aero-derivative gas turbine with a capacity of 30MW and 33 MW peak power with a thermal efficiency of 36% developed since 2002–2003 and presented at 2005 MAKS but with little information after that. Airflow: 99.3 kg/s, Overall pressure ratio: 22.1:1.

== Applications ==
- Yakovlev Yak-141

== Specifications (R-79V-300) ==
Data from Zrelov, Maslov, 1999; Butowski, Fricker, (1995)

==== General characteristics ====
- Type: Contra-rotating twin-spool, axial flow, afterburning turbofan
- Length: 523 cm (205.9 in)
- Diameter: 171.6 cm (67.6 in) overall, 124 cm (48.8 in) without afterburner-nozzle. 110 cm (43.3 in) inlet.
- Dry weight: 2,750 kg (6,062.7 lb) including nozzle and accessories

==== Components ====
- Compressor: 3-stage low pressure compressor, 11-stage high pressure compressor with bleed air from the 7th stage for roll control
- Combustors: Annular
- Turbine: 2-stage low pressure turbine, 2-stage high pressure turbine

==== Performance ====
- Maximum thrust:
  - 152 kN (34,171.0 lbf) with full afterburner
  - 137 kN (30,798.8 lbf) with afterburner and 10 kg/s of bleed air
  - 122.5 kN (27,539.1 lbf) hovering with afterburner (limited to 2.5 minutes)
  - 103 kN (23,155.3 lbf) dry
- Overall pressure ratio: 22
- Bypass ratio: 0.80 - 0.81
- Air mass flow: 180 kg/s (396.8 lb/s)
- Turbine inlet temperature: 1,347 °C (1,620 K; 2,457 °F)
- Specific fuel consumption: 67.2 kg/(kN·h (0.66 lb/(lbf·h)) dry, 169 kg/(kN·h (1.66 lb/(lbf·h)) with reheat

== See also ==
- Pratt & Whitney F401 (JTF22A-30A)
- Rolls-Royce/MAN Turbo RB.153 (RB.153-61)
