= Tumansky R-25 =

1970s Soviet turbojet aircraft engine

R-25
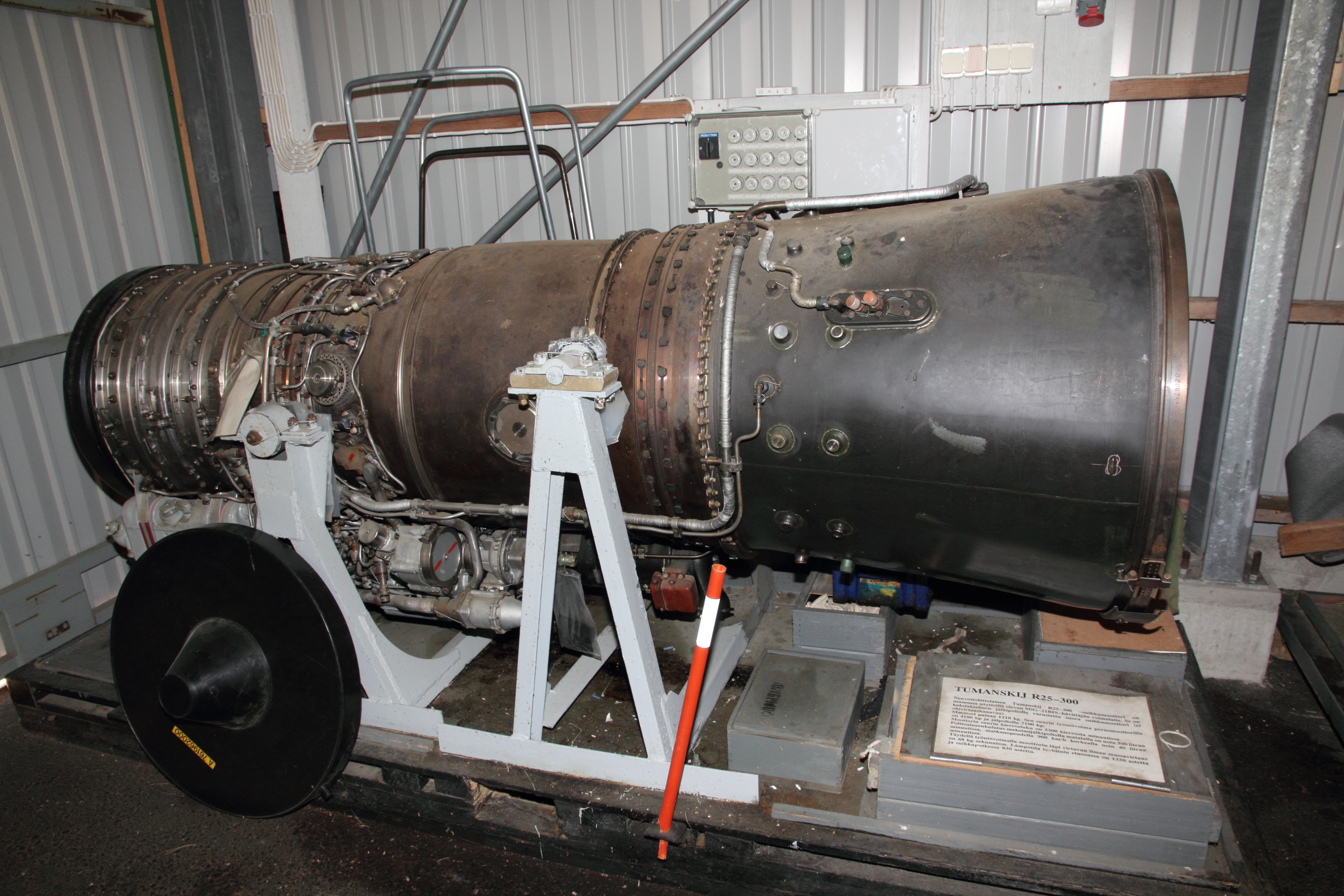
- Tumanski R-25-300 engine in Karhulan ilmailukerho Aviation Museum
- Type: Turbojet
- Manufacturer: Tumansky, UMPO NPP Motor
- First run: 1971
- Major applications: Sukhoi Su-15; Mikoyan-Gurevich MiG-21
- Number built: 3,200
- Developed from: Tumansky R-11

The Tumansky R-25 is a turbojet engine, which is seen as the ultimate development of Tumansky R-11. It was designed under the leadership of Sergei Alekseevich Gavrilov.

== Design and development ==
The Tumansky R-25 was designed as a replacement for the Tumansky R-13 in MiG-21 fighters. The R-25 is a two-spool axial-flow turbojet with a new compressor with increased overall pressure ratio and airflow, variable two-stage afterburner, and greater use of titanium.

An unusual addition to the R-25 was an emergency mode thrust boost which increased the compressor speed to 106% and also increased the afterburner fuel flow with the addition of a second afterburner fuel pump. Thrust was increased to 96.5 kilonewtons (21,700 lb_{f}) below an altitude of 2,000 metres (6,600 ft). The time limit for its use was 1 minute during training and 2 minutes in wartime, as further use caused the engine to overheat and be irreparably damaged. Use of this WEP required the engine to be removed on landing for inspection. Use of WEP shortened the already limited time between overhaul typical of Soviet-made engines of that era compared to Western engines.

The R-25 engine was used on the MiG-21bis and the Sukhoi Su-15bis. A total of 3,200 R-25 were built between 1971 and 1975. The engine was also built under license by HAL in India for its fleet of MiG-21bis.

== Specifications (R-25-300) ==
==== General characteristics ====
- Type: Afterburning turbojet
- Length: 4,615 mm (181.7 in)
- Diameter: 1,191 mm (46.9 in)
- Dry weight: 1,212 kg (2,670 lb)

==== Components ====
- Compressor: Two-spool axial compressor 3 LP stages, 5 HP stages
- Combustors: Cannular 10 burners
- Turbine: 1 HP stage, 1 LP stage

==== Performance ====
- Maximum thrust:
- 40.3 kilonewtons (9,100 lb_{f})
- 69.6 kilonewtons (15,600 lb_{f}) max afterburner
- 97.1 kilonewtons (21,800 lb_{f}) max afterburner emergency
- Overall pressure ratio: 9.5:1
- Turbine inlet temperature: 1,040 °C (1,904 °F)
- Specific fuel consumption:
- 93 kg/(h·kN) (0.91 lb/(h·lbf)) at idle
- 98 kg/(h·kN) (0.96 lb/(h·lbf)) at maximum military power
- 229 kg/(h·kN) (2.25 lb/(h·lbf)) max afterburner
- 340 kg/(h·kN) (3.34 lb/(h·lbf)) max afterburner emergency
- Thrust-to-weight ratio: 5.6 (max afterburner)

== See also ==
Related development

- Tumansky R-11
- Tumansky R-13

Related lists

- List of aircraft engines
