= Tumansky R-13 =

Soviet turbojet aircraft engine

R-13
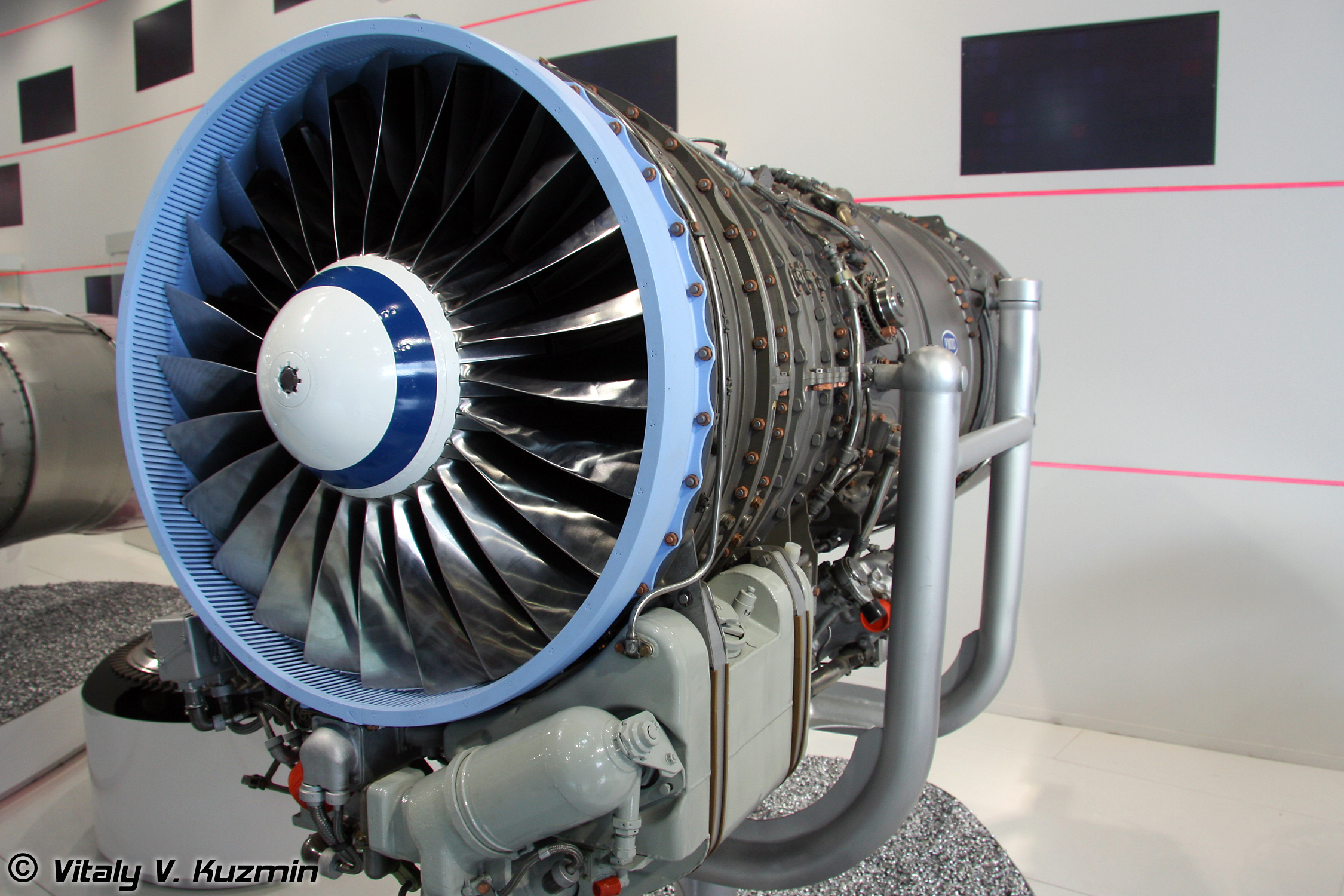
- The R-195 derivative used on the Su-25
- Type: Turbojet
- Manufacturer: Tumansky
- Major applications: Sukhoi Su-15; Mikoyan-Gurevich MiG-21
- Developed from: Tumansky R-11

The Tumansky R-13 is a Soviet turbojet engine designed by Sergei Alekseevich Gavrilov.

== Design and development ==
The Tumansky R-13 is a development of the successful Tumansky R-11 engine. It is a two-spool axial-flow turbojet featuring a new five-stage high-pressure compressor, new combustion chamber design to facilitate restarting the engine at high altitudes, new afterburner, and greater use of titanium components. It is used by MiG-21M, MF, SM, and SMT, and Sukhoi Su-15M and TM. R-13 is also built in China as LM WP13, and similar to Tumansky R-11 — originally both were licensed to be built in China, but after the Sino-Soviet split all Soviet technical support was withdrawn, Chinese proceeded on their own. Under the leadership of the principal engineer Jiang Hepu (江和甫), both R-11 and R-13 were successfully built in China.

The R-95 is a non-afterburning development of this engine used by initial versions of the Sukhoi Su-25 attack aircraft. It was subsequently replaced in production by the improved R-195, which produces 12 percent more thrust.

== Specifications (R-13-300) ==
==== General characteristics ====
- Type: Afterburning turbojet
- Length: 4,605 mm (181.3 in)
- Diameter: 1,095 mm (43.1 in)
- Dry weight: 1,205 kg (2,656 lb)

==== Components ====
- Compressor: Two-spool axial compressor, 3-stage LP, 5-stage HP
- Combustors: can-annular
- Turbine: one stage LP, one stage HP

==== Performance ====
- Maximum thrust:
- 39.9 kN (8,970 lbf) military thrust
- 63.7 kN (14,320 lbf) with afterburner
- Overall pressure ratio: 8.9:1
- Turbine inlet temperature: 1,005 °C (1,840 °F)
- Specific fuel consumption:
- 95 kg/(h·kN) (0.93 lb/(h·lbf)) at idle
- 213 kg/(h·kN) (2.09 lb/(h·lbf)) with afterburner
- Thrust-to-weight ratio: 5.4

== See also ==
Related development

- Tumansky R-11
- Tumansky R-25

Related lists

- List of aircraft engines
