= Mikoyan-Gurevich 23-01 =

Type of aircraft

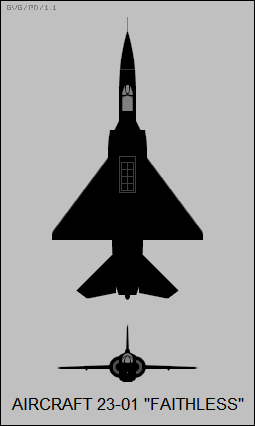
- a 2-view of the 23-01

General information
- Type: STOL fighter-bomber
- National origin: USSR
- Manufacturer: OKB Mikoyan-Gurevich
- Designer: V A Mikoyan (project manager)

History
- First flight: 3 April 1967
- Developed from: Mikoyan-Gurevich 23-31 / Izdeliye 92

The Mikoyan-Gurevich 23-01, aka Izdeliye 92 and (erroneously) Mikoyan-Gurevich MiG-23PD, NATO reporting name Faithless, was a 1960s STOL fighter / attack aircraft, designed in the USSR, to fulfil a requirement for ground-attack and fighter aircraft able to operate from short runways.

== Specifications (23-01) ==
Data from Soviet X-Planes

General characteristics

- Crew: 1
- Length: 16.8 m (55 ft 1 in) (excl. PVD boom)
- Wingspan: 7.72 m (25 ft 4 in)
- Wing area: 40 m^{2} (430 sq ft)
- Empty weight: 12,020 kg (26,500 lb)
- Gross weight: 16,000 kg (35,274 lb)
- Powerplant: 1 × Tumansky R-27-300 afterburning turbojet engine, 76.49 kN (17,196 lbf) with afterburner
- Powerplant: 2 × Rybinsk RD-36-35 turbojet engines, 46.09 kN (10,362 lbf) thrust each lift engines for STOL operations only

Performance

- Take-off run: 180–200 m (591–656 ft) at light AUW
- Landing run: 250 m (820 ft) with brake parachute

Armament

- Missiles: displayed with dummy Vympel R-23R and R-23T missiles on two underwing pylons

Avionics
Provision for a large fire-control radar in the nose
