= Tumansky R-11 =

Soviet turbojet aircraft engine

R-11
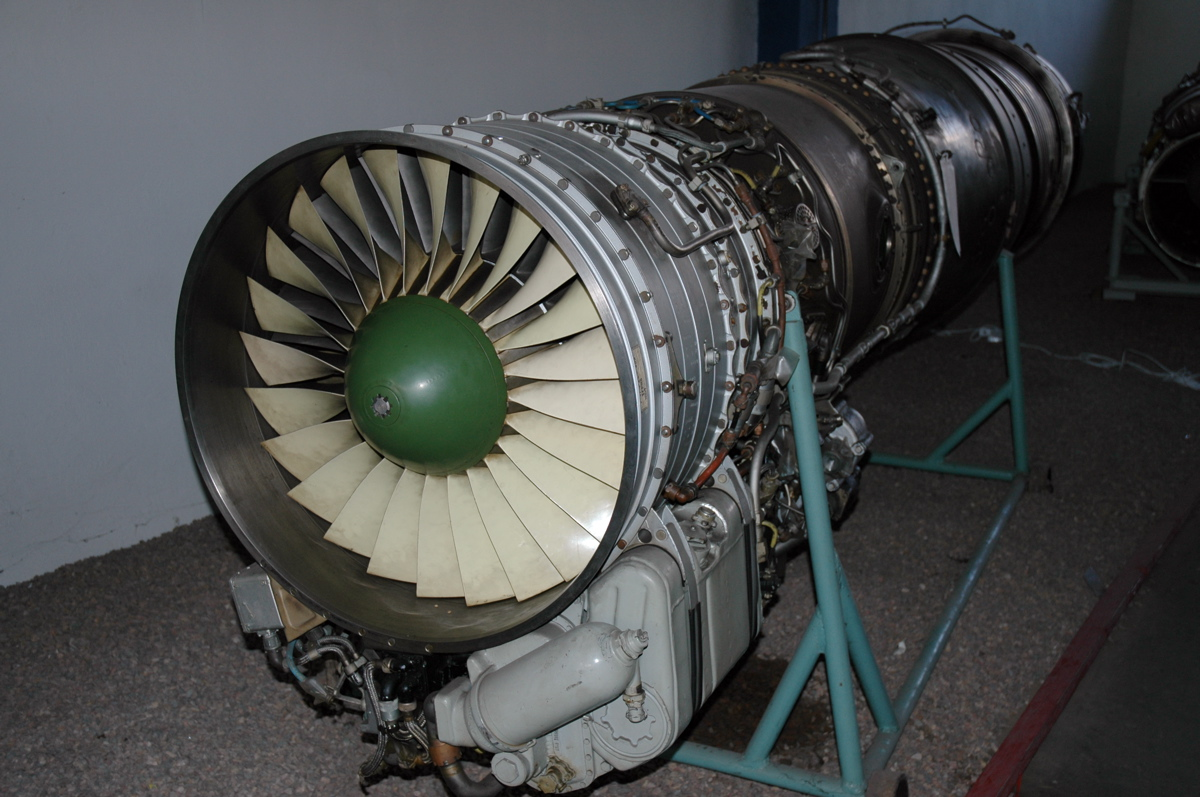
- Preserved Tumansky R-11 turbojet engine at the Polish Aviation Museum
- Type: Turbojet
- National origin: Soviet Union
- Manufacturer: Tumansky
- First run: 1956
- Major applications: Sukhoi Su-15; Mikoyan-Gurevich MiG-21; Yakovlev Yak-28
- Number built: 20,900

The Tumansky R-11 (initially AM-11) is a Soviet Cold War-era turbojet engine.

== Design and development ==
The Tumansky R-11 was developed by A.A. Mikulin, Sergei Tumansky, and B.S. Stechkin as a twin-spool axial-flow high-altitude non-afterburning turbojet for Yakovlev Yak-25RV reconnaissance aircraft. This engine was the first Soviet twin-spool turbojet. It was first run in early 1956 and was later employed in some variants of the Yakovlev Yak-26 and Yakovlev Yak-27, as well as the Yak-28. The R-11's basic design was very successful and it was later developed into the Tumansky R-13 and Tumansky R-25 along with the experimental Tumansky R-21. A total of 20,900 R-11 engines were built.

== Variants ==
- R-11V-300 - first production version, high-altitude, non-afterburning
- R-11F-300 (R-37F) - afterburning version, entered production in 1956, used on MiG-21F, P and U.
- R-11AF-300 - improved version for Yakovlev Yak-28B, L and U.
- R-11F2-300 - new compressor, afterburner and nozzle, used on MiG-21P, PF and FL.
- R-11AF2-300 - R-11F2-300 adapted for Yakovlev Yak-28I, R and P.
- R-11F2S-300 - upgraded version for MiG-21PFM, PFS, S, U and UM, and for Sukhoi Su-15, UT and UM.
- Shenyang WP-7, Chinese license built copies of the R-11

== Applications ==
- Sukhoi Su-15
- Mikoyan-Gurevich MiG-21
- Yakovlev Yak-25
- Yakovlev Yak-26
- Yakovlev Yak-27
- Yakovlev Yak-28

== Specifications (R-11F2S-300) ==
==== General characteristics ====
- Type: Afterburning turbojet
- Length: 4,600 mm (181.1 in)
- Diameter: 906 mm (35.7 in)
- Dry weight: 1,124 kg (2,477 lb)

==== Components ====
- Compressor: Axial compressor, 3-stage LP, 3-stage HP
- Turbine: one stage LP, one stage HP

==== Performance ====
- Maximum thrust:
- 38.7 kN (8,708 lbf) military power
- 60.6 kN (13,635 lbf) with afterburner
- Overall pressure ratio: 8.9:1
- Turbine inlet temperature: 955 °C (1,750 °F)
- Specific fuel consumption:
- 97 kg/(h·kN) (0.95 lb/(h·lbf)) at idle
- 242 kg/(h·kN) (2.37 lb/(h·lbf)) with afterburner
- Thrust-to-weight ratio: 3.51; 5.50 with afterburner.

== See also ==
- List of aircraft engines
- Pratt & Whitney J57
