= Yakovlev Yak-141 =

Soviet vertical takeoff fighter prototype

Yak-141
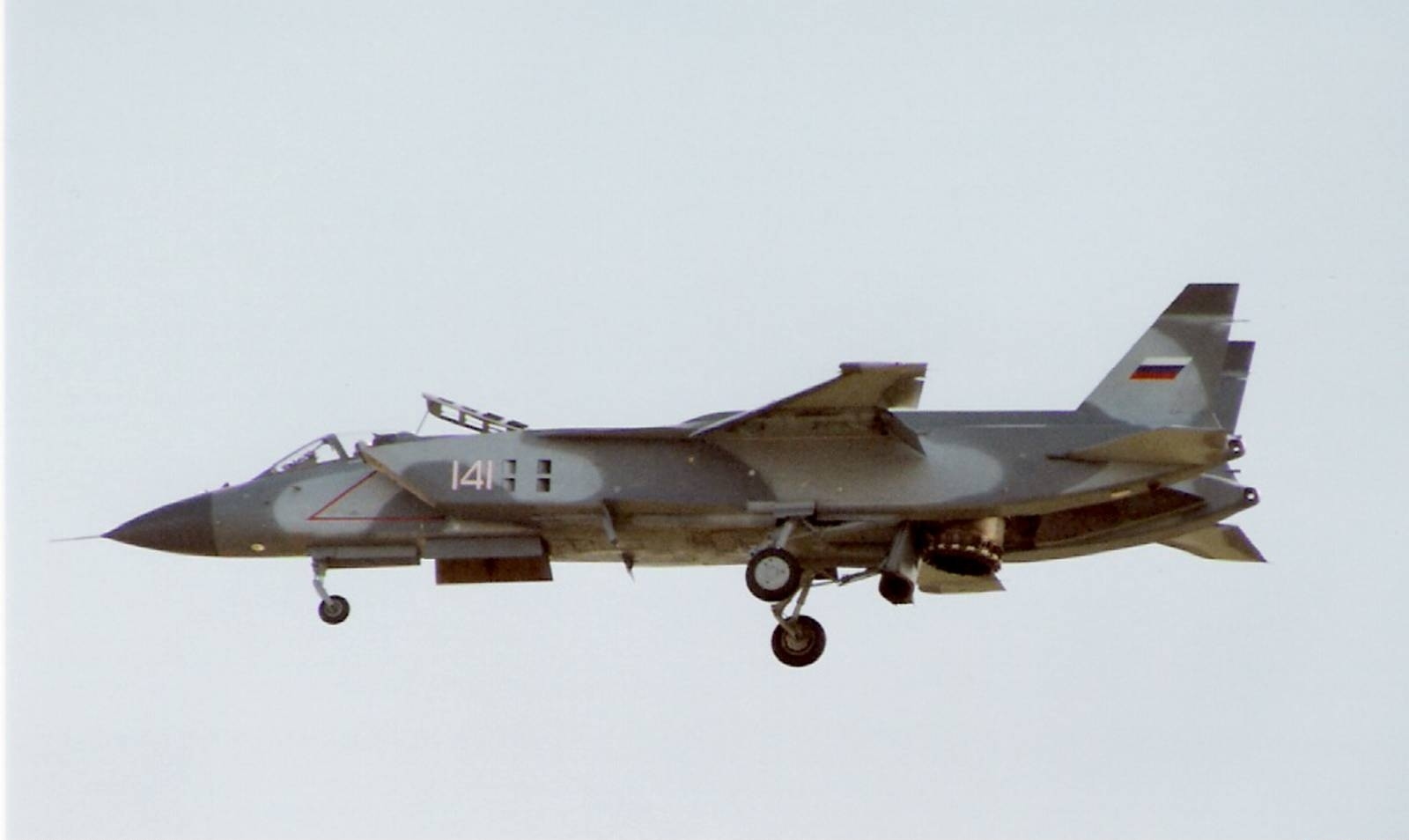
- Yakovlev Yak-141 at the 1992 Farnborough Airshow

General information
- Type: VTOL fighter aircraft
- National origin: Soviet Union
- Manufacturer: Yakovlev
- Status: Cancelled in August 1991
- Primary user: Soviet Navy
- Number built: 4

History
- First flight: 9 March 1987

The Yakovlev Yak-141 (Russian: Яковлев Як-141; NATO reporting name "Freestyle"), also known as the Yak-41, is a Soviet supersonic vertical takeoff/landing (VTOL) fighter aircraft designed by Yakovlev. Intended as a replacement for the Yak-38, it was designed as a supersonic fleet defence fighter capable of STOVL/VTOL operating from Soviet carriers. Four prototypes were built before the project's cancellation.

== Design and development ==
Known internally as "Product 48", the Yak-141 was intended to replace the Yak-38 in service with the Soviet Navy. It went through significant design evolution. Configurations studied by Yakovlev included a twin-engine configuration, which was rejected due to asymmetric thrust issues in the event of an engine failure during landing, and a single-engined configuration, with lift jets to allow for vertical takeoff and landing, was selected.

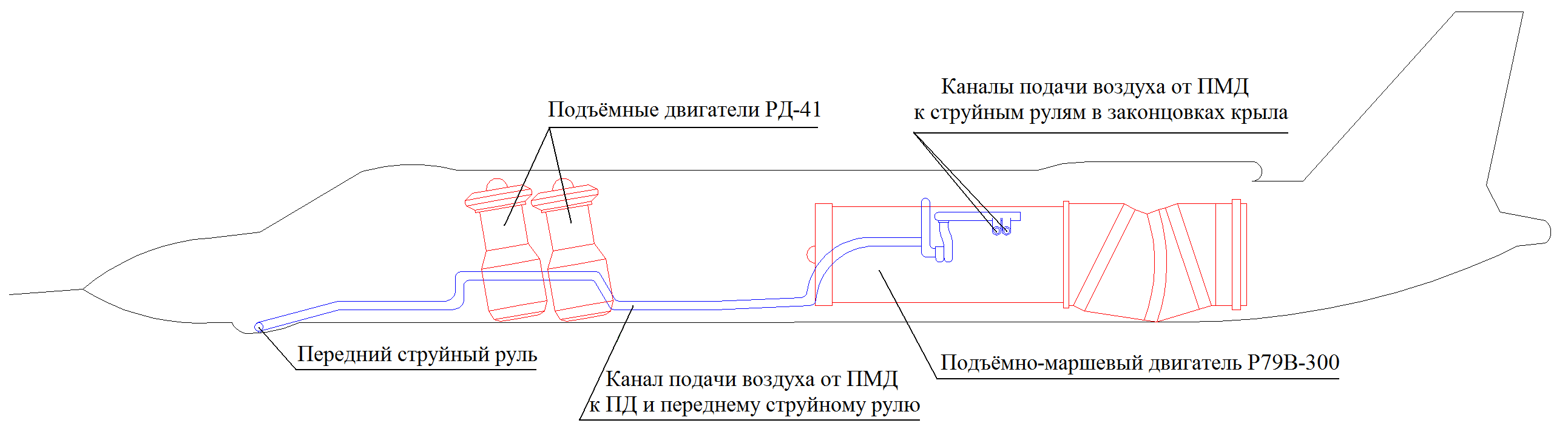
Arrangement of Yak-141 powerplant

The engines were controlled digitally; maneuverability during the hover was provided by reaction control jets, using excess airflow from the engines, located at the wingtips and under the nose. The pressurised cockpit was fitted with an automatic ejection seat; the automatic functionality would be armed when the engine duct was rotated past 30° when at an airspeed of less than 300 kilometres per hour (160 kn; 190 mph). The prototypes had a cockpit arrangement similar to that of the Yak-38M; the production aircraft were planned to be fitted with an entirely new digital system including a helmet-mounted sight. The aircraft's landing gear was of the tricycle type; the nosewheel retracted to the rear, the main wheels retracting forwards.

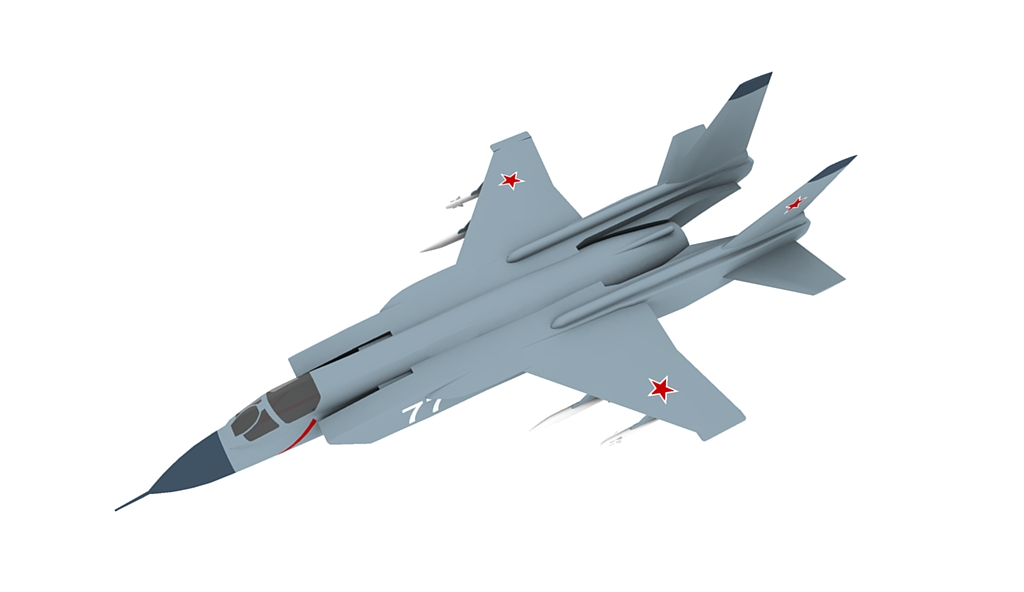
Illustration of Yakovlev Yak-141

The wing was mounted high on the fuselage, and was foldable to allow for compact storage on board aircraft carriers. The main engine was a Tumansky R-79V-300, while the lift jets were a pair of Rybinsk (RKBM) RD-41s, installed at an angle of 85° in the forwards fuselage behind the cockpit.

Four prototypes were built; the first was a static-test article, the second a nonflying testbed, while the third and fourth prototypes would be used for flight testing

== Operational history ==
The first flight took place on in 9 March 1987 at Zhukovsky; the aircraft first undertook hovering flight on 29 December 1989, with the first full transition from vertical to horizontal flight taking place on 13 June 1990. Trials on the mockup aircraft carrier deck at Saky began in April 1991. Results of the testing were considered satisfactory, with the aircraft's combat maneuverability regarded as excellent. Twelve world records were set during flight testing; as the aircraft's designation of Yak-41 was considered classified, the records were declared as having been set by the "Yak-141".

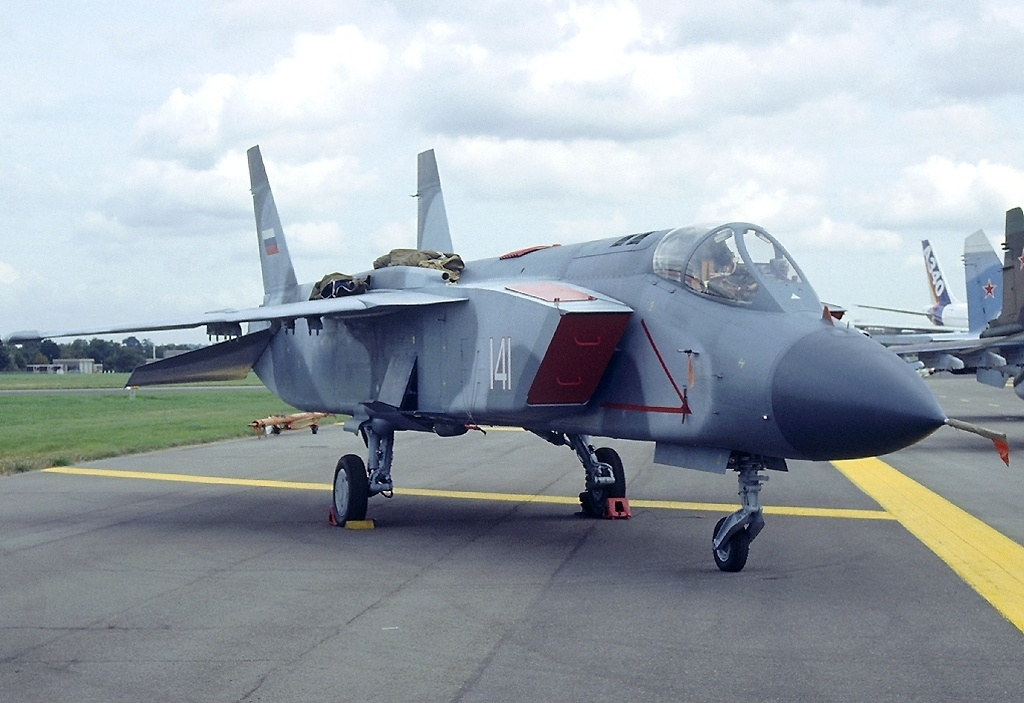
Yak-141 at 1992 Farnborough Airshow

The first landing aboard the Russian aircraft carrier Admiral Gorshkov took place on 26 September 1991, using the second (first flying) prototype; the other flying prototype landed aboard an hour later. Eight flights from the ship were completed before 5 October, when following a hard landing a fuel tank ruptured, the aircraft catching fire and the pilot ejecting. The aircraft was later repaired for display. Later in October 1991 the program was suspended due to a lack of funds.

With the fall of the Soviet Union, Lockheed Aircraft entered a partnership with Yakovlev in 1991 for further development of the aircraft, now officially redesignated Yak-141; the partnership would not be announced by Yakovlev until 6 September 1992 and not confirmed by Lockheed until June 1994. The remaining intact prototype was displayed at the Farnborough Airshow in 1992. It was announced that the joint venture would result in the construction of three additional prototypes and an additional static test aircraft, one a two-seat trainer version, and all with an increase in their gross weight, however no additional aircraft were ever built.

== Variants ==
Yak-41
The two flying prototypes and ground test article.
Yak-41M
Proposed production aircraft with large LERXs (leading-edge root extensions) and other improvements, particularly in the avionic suite.

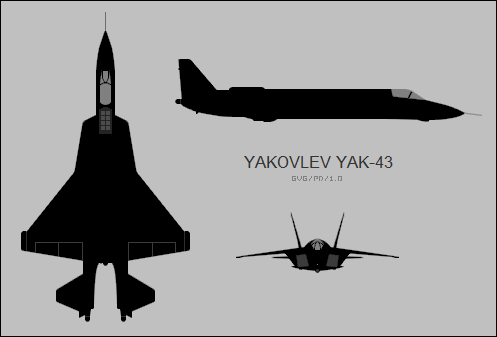
the proposed Yak-43

Yak-43 (Izdeliye 201)
A proposed development of the Yak-41M 'Freehand' equipped with Kuznetsov NK-321 engines.
Yak-141
Designation originally applied to a single Yak-41 for disinformation and propaganda purposes when registering records with the FAI (Fédération Aéronautique Internationale) and later for promotional purposes by Yakovlev.

== Operators ==
Soviet Union

- Soviet Navy
  - Soviet Naval Aviation

== Surviving aircraft ==
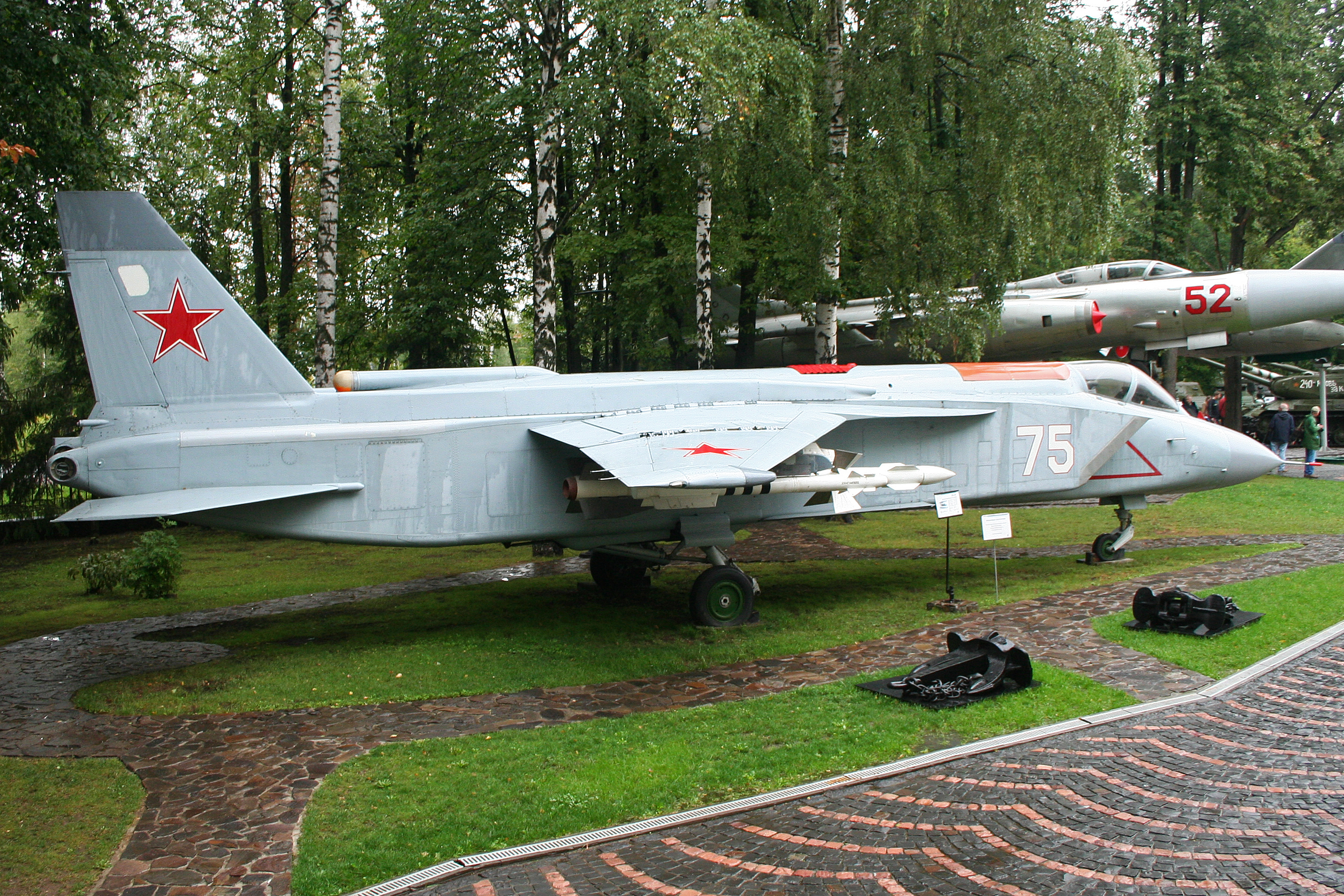
Underwing stores fitted to the Yak-141 (msn 48-3) on display at Technical Museum, Arkhangelskoye, Moscow. Russia. 14-8-2012

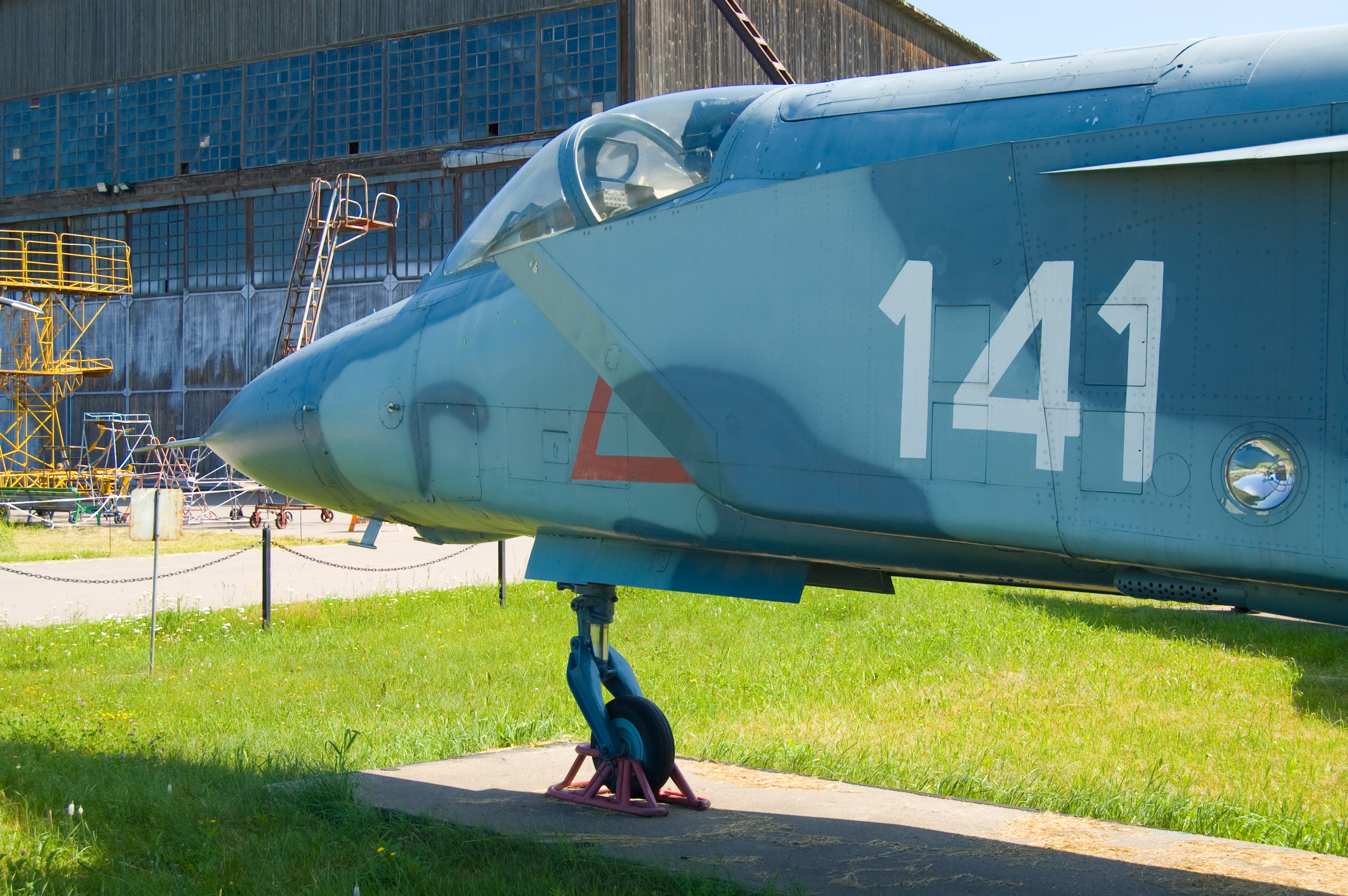
A Yakovlev Yak-141 at the Russian Air Museum in Monino

- Yak-41M (s/n 48-2, call sign "75") is on display at the Central Air Force Museum at Monino. The aircraft is displayed in its 1992 livery with olive/grey camouflage markings.
- Yak-41M (s/n 48-3, call sign "77") is on display at the Yakovlev OKB Museum. The aircraft is displayed in its 1992 livery with olive/grey camouflage markings and "141" painted in white in place of the former call sign.

== Specifications (Yak-141) ==
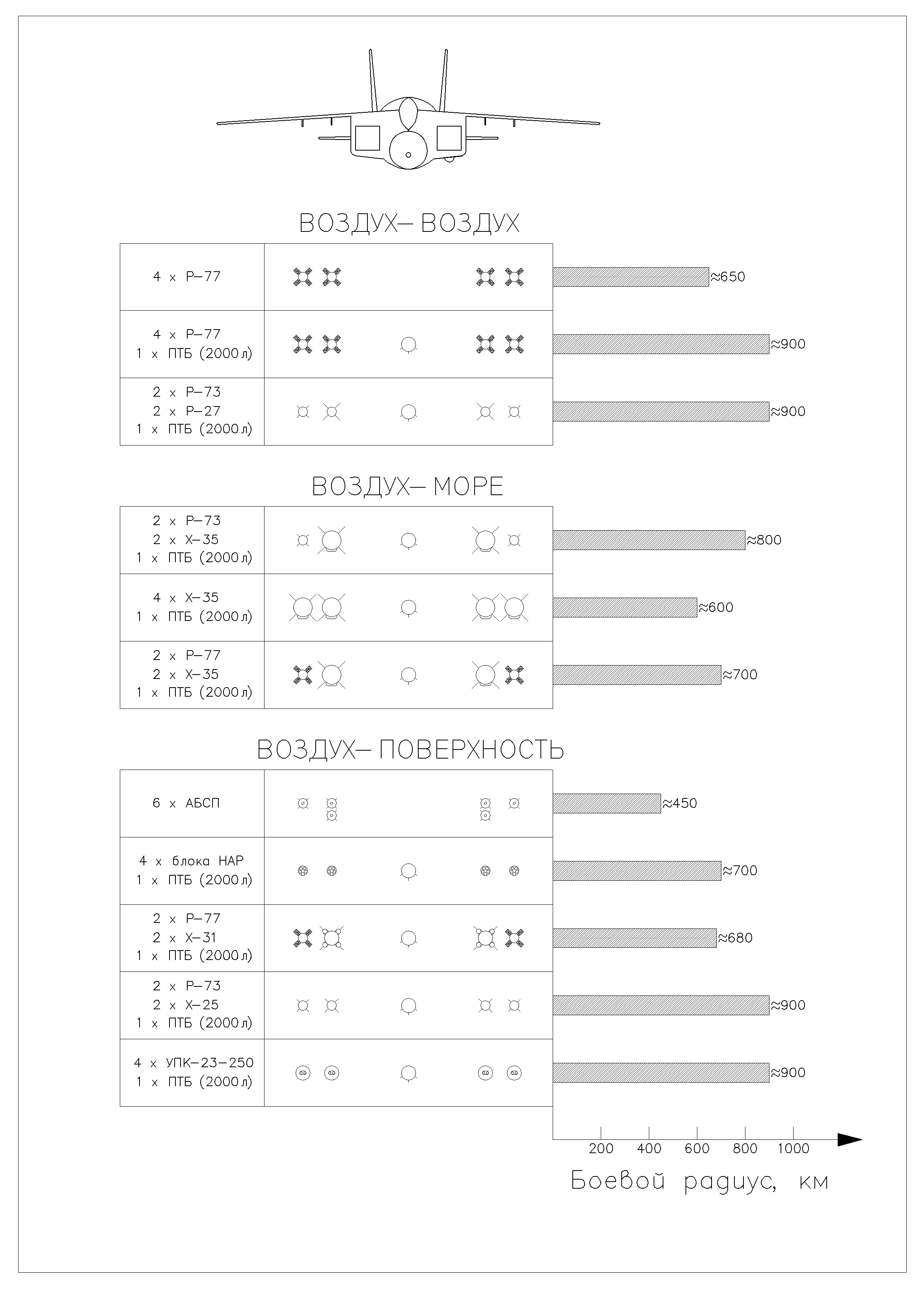
Yakovlev Yak-141 armament scheme

Data from Yak-141 Gunston, Winchester, Yak-141 'Freestyle', Combat Aircraft since 1945

General characteristics

- Crew: 1
- Length: 18.36 m (60 ft 3 in)
- Wingspan: 10.105 m (33 ft 2 in)
- Height: 5 m (16 ft 5 in)
- Wing area: 31.7 m^{2} (341 sq ft)
- Empty weight: 11,650 kg (25,684 lb)
- Max takeoff weight: 19,500 kg (42,990 lb)
- Powerplant: 1 × Tumansky R-79V-300 afterburning vectoring-nozzle turbofan, 108 kN (24,000 lbf) thrust dry, 152 kN (34,000 lbf) with afterburner
- Powerplant: 2 × Rybinsk (RKBM) RD-41 turbojets, 41.7 kN (9,400 lbf) thrust each canted rearwards from vertical

Performance

- Maximum speed: 1,800 km/h (1,100 mph, 970 kn)
- Range: 2,100 km (1,300 mi, 1,100 nmi)
- Ferry range: 3,000 km (1,900 mi, 1,600 nmi)
- Service ceiling: 15,500 m (50,900 ft)
- Rate of climb: 250 m/s (49,000 ft/min)

Armament

- Guns: 1 × 30 mm GSh-30-1 autocannon with 120 rounds
- Hardpoints: 4 underwing and 1 fuselage hardpoints with a capacity of 2,600 kg (5,733 lb) of external stores, with provisions to carry combinations of:
  - Rockets: S-5 rocketK rocket pods, S-8KO rocket pods, S-13OF rocket pods, S-24B
  - Missiles: R-77, R-73, R-27, Kh-35, Kh-31, Kh-25
  - Bombs: OFAB-100, FAB-250, OFAB-250, FAB-500, OFAB-500, ZAB-500 incendiary bomb
  - Other: 23mm GSh-23L, 2000litre external fuel tank (centre hardpoint)

== See also ==
Related development

- Yakovlev Yak-38
- Yakovlev Yak-201

Aircraft of comparable role, configuration, and era

- British Aerospace Sea Harrier
- McDonnell Douglas AV-8B Harrier II
