= Tumansky R-21 =

1960s Soviet turbojet engine

R-21
- Type: Turbojet
- Manufacturer: Tumansky
- First run: 1960
- Major applications: Mikoyan-Gurevich Ye-8
- Developed from: Tumansky R-11

The Tumansky R-21 was a Soviet turbojet engine of the 1960s. Used for development only, the project was canceled.

== Design and development ==
The Tumansky R-21 was developed at Tushino motor plant (part of OKB-300), headed by Nikolai Georgievich Metskhvarishvili, as a twin-spool axial-flow afterburning turbojet. It was based on the Tumansky R-11 with the goal of increasing thrust and airflow, using a new six-stage compressor with a larger diameter and different rotor blades than its predecessor as well as a new afterburner chamber and variable exhaust nozzle. The increased pressure ratio and turbine inlet temperature required components to be fabricated from advanced alloys. Several contemporary Soviet aircraft were planned to use the R-21, including the Sukhoi T-58, Sukhoi T-6 and the Mikoyan-Gurevich Ye-8. On September 11, 1962 an R-21, fitted to a Ye-8, exploded in mid-air after compressor failure; test pilot Georgy Mosolov survived the ejection at Mach 1.78, but he never fully recovered. Shortly afterward the Ye-8 program was cancelled along with R-21 development in favour of heavier fighter planes such as the Mikoyan-Gurevich MiG-23, which required more powerful engines.

== Variants ==
- R-21F-300 – the only version built.

== Specifications (R-21F-300) ==
==== General characteristics ====
- Type: Afterburning turbojet
- Length:
- Diameter: 987 mm (38.9 in)
- Dry weight: 1,250 kg (2,755 lb)

==== Components ====
- Compressor: Six-stage axial compressor

==== Performance ====
- Maximum thrust:
- 46.1 kN (10,361 lbf) military power
- 80.6 kN (15,873 lbf) with afterburner
- Thrust-to-weight ratio: 3.76; 5.76 with afterburner.

== See also ==
Related development

- Tumansky R-11

Related lists

- List of aircraft engines
