= Rybinsk RD-36-35 =

Small lift turbojet engine

- Type: turbojet lift engine
- National origin: USSR
- Manufacturer: Rybinsk Engine Design Bureau (RKBM)
- Designer: Pyotr A. Kolesov

The Rybinsk RD-36-35 was a small lift turbojet engine, designed for use on V/STOL aircraft at the Rybinsk Engine Design Bureau (RKBM), designed by Pyotr A. Kolesov. Very little is known of this engine, probably due to confusion with the similarly designated Kolesov RD-36 and Lotarev D-36, which have little or no relation to the lift-jet.

== Variants and Applications ==
RD-36-35
- MiG-21PD
- Mikoyan-Gurevich 23-01 (Mikoyan Guryevich E-7PD)
- Sukhoi T-58VD
RD-36-35PR
- Bartini Beriev VVA-14
RD-36-35F
- Bartini KOR-70 (Project for high speed VTOL ship-borne floatplane Kor.S)
- Yakovlev Yak-36M
- Yakovlev Yak-38U
RD-36-35FV
(izdeliye 24) 28.45 kN (6,396 lbf)
- Yakovlev Yak-36M
RD-36-35FVR
(izdeliye 28) 29.9 kN (6,722 lbf)
- Yakovlev Yak-38
- Yakovlev Yak-38U
RD-36-35K
- Mikoyan-Gurevich MiG-105

== Specifications (RD-36-35FV) ==
Data from OKB Yakovlev

==== General characteristics ====
- Type: Lift turbojet
- Length:
- Diameter:
- Dry weight: 176 kg (388 lb) (RD-36-35F)

==== Components ====
- Compressor: 6-stage axial
- Turbine: 1-stage axial

==== Performance ====
- Maximum thrust: 28.45 kN (6,396 lbf)
