= Gryazev-Shipunov GSh-30-1 =

1980s Soviet 30mm aircraft autocannon

GSh-30-1
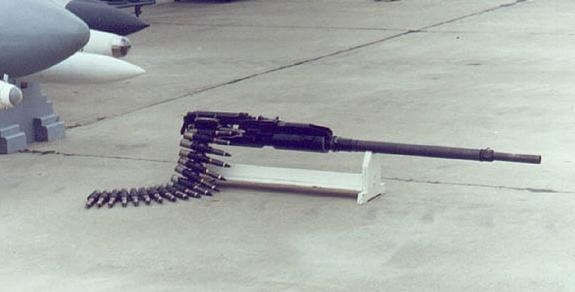
- GSh-30-1
- Type: Aircraft autocannon
- Place of origin: Soviet Union

Service history
- In service: 1980–present

Production history
- Designer: V. Gryazev, A. Shipunov
- Designed: 1977
- Manufacturer: Izhmash
- Produced: 1980–present

Specifications
- Mass: 46 kg (101 lb)
- Length: 1,978 mm (77.87 in)
- Barrel length: 1,500 mm (59.06 in)
- Width: 156 mm (6.14 in)
- Height: 185 mm (7.28 in)
- Shell: 30×165 mm
- Caliber: 30mm
- Barrels: 1
- Action: Short recoil operated
- Rate of fire: 1,500–1,800 rounds/min
- Muzzle velocity: 900 m/s (3,000 ft/s)
- Effective firing range: 200–1,800 m (220–1,970 yd)
- Maximum firing range: 1,800 m (1,970 yd)

The Gryazev-Shipunov GSh-30-1 (also known by the GRAU index designation 9A-4071K) is a 30 mm (1.18 in) autocannon designed for use on Soviet and later Russian military aircraft, entering service in the early 1980s. Its current manufacturer is the Russian company JSC Izhmash. The name GSh-30-1 is formed from the surnames of the designers Gryazev (Грязев) and Shipunov (Шипунов), the caliber of 30 mm and the single-barrel design of the gun itself.

== Description ==
The GSh-30-1 is a single-barreled, recoil operated autocannon weighing 46 kg (101 lb). Unlike many postwar cannons, it uses a short recoil action instead of a revolver cannon or Gatling gun mechanism. This results in a reduced rate of fire, but lower weight and bulk.

The GSh-30-1 has a rate of fire of 1,800 rounds per minute, customarily limited to 1,500 rounds per minute to reduce barrel wear. Despite that, its barrel life is quite short: 2,000 rounds, with a continuous burst rated for 150 rounds. The gun uses an evaporation cooling system to prevent the detonation of a high explosive round inside a heated barrel. This cooling system consists of a cylindrical water tank around the rear end of the barrel. The GSh-30-1 is equipped with a unique pyrotechnic mechanism to clear misfires: a small pyrotechnic cartridge is located to the left of the 30 mm cartridge chamber. This pyrotechnic cartridge fires a small steel bolt through the side wall of the 30mm cartridge. The hot propellant gases following the bolt into the dud 30 mm round ignite the powder charge of that round and firing continues.

The gun's maximum effective range against aerial targets is 200 to 800 m (660 to 2,600 ft) and against surface or ground targets is 1,200 to 1,800 m (3,900 to 5,900 ft).

In combination with a laser rangefinding and targeting system, it is reported to be extremely accurate as well as powerful, capable of destroying a target with as few as three to five rounds. It has been deployed on several different types of fighter aircraft:

- Su-27, Su-30, Su-33, Su-34, Su-35 and Su-37: 1 GSh-30-1 in starboard wing root (150 rounds of ammunition load)
- Su-57: 1 GSh-30-1 in right LEVCON root
- MiG-29: 1 GSh-30-1 in port wing root (150 rounds ammunition load)
- Sukhoi Su-75 Checkmate
- Yak-141: 1 GSh-30-1 on the belly (120 rounds ammunition load)
- Shenyang J-11, J-15, J-16: 1 GSh-30-1 in starboard wing root (150 rounds ammunition load)
- HAL Tejas mark 2 : 1 GSh-30-1
- 9A4273 gun pod: 1 GSh-30-1 flexibly mounted, pod weight 480 kg (1,060 lb) (150 rounds ammunition load)

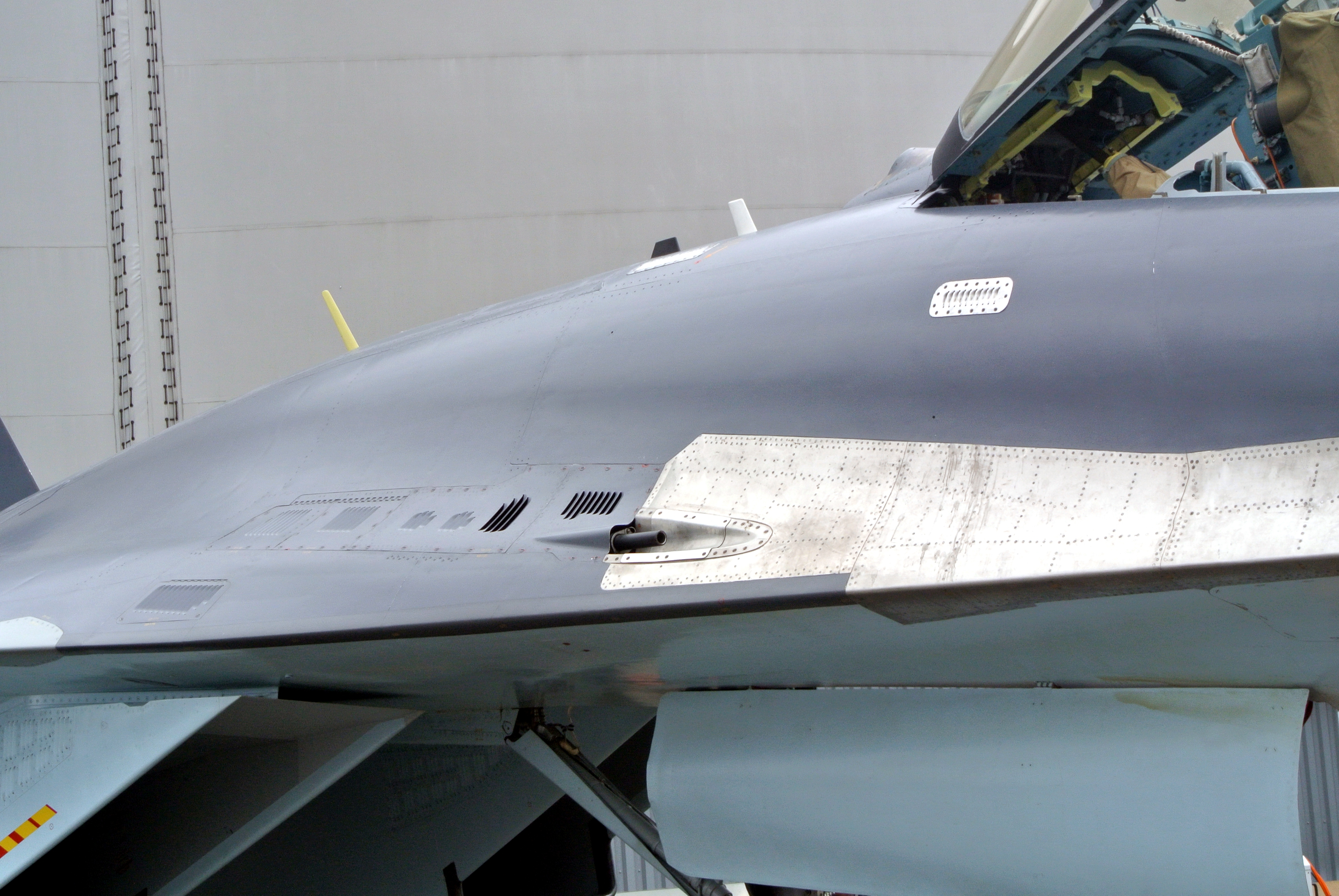
The GSh-30-1 gun mount on the Sukhoi Su-35

=== Operational history ===
During the 2022 Russian invasion of Ukraine, Ukraine confirmed that Colonel Ihor Bedzay, the deputy head of the Ukrainian Navy, was killed when his Mi-14 was shot down by a Russian Su-35. This cannon was used by a Russian Su-35 to try and shoot down the Mi-14Ps, however the helicopter appeared to have evaded the cannon fire. The Russian Su-35 then fired a missile at the MI-14, destroying the helicopter.

== Ammunition ==
The 30x165 mm rounds, fitted with distance-armed and delayed action fuze, are commonly fired from the GSh-30-1. This type of ammunition is intended to engage air and ground targets. The 30x165 mm round can have several projectiles. Its variants are:

- Armour-piercing tracer (AP-T)
- Armour-piercing incendiary tracer (API-T)
- Semi armor-piercing high explosive (SAPHEI)
- Inert armour-piercing (AP Inert)
- High explosive tracer (HE-T)
- Short range high explosive tracer (HE-T-SR)
- Inert high explosive tracer (HE-T Inert)
- High explosive Incendiary (HEI)
- High explosive incendiary tracer (HEI-T)
- Multielement kinetic energy time fuze (MKETF)
- Target practice (RTP)
- Target practice tracer (RTP-T)

== See also ==
- List of Russian weaponry
