= Yakovlev Yak-38 =

VTOL strike aircraft; only operational VTOL strike aircraft of the Soviet Navy

Yak-38
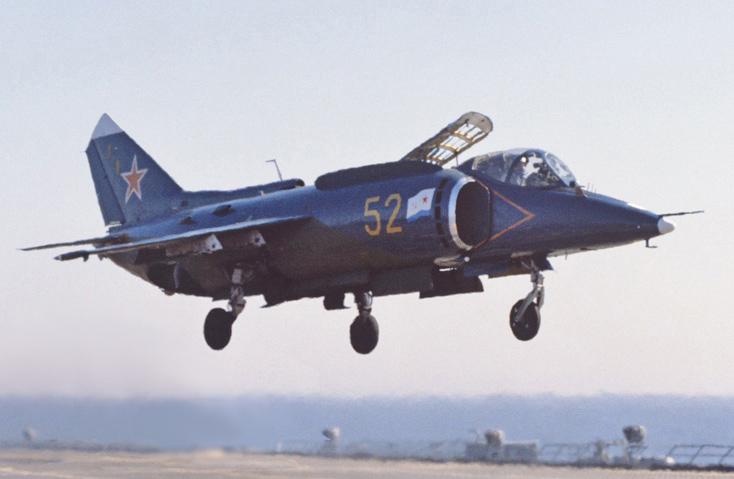
- A Soviet Navy Yak-38 landing aboard Novorossiysk

General information
- Type: VTOL strike aircraft
- National origin: Soviet Union
- Manufacturer: Yakovlev
- Status: Retired
- Primary user: Soviet Naval Aviation
- Number built: 231, including Yak-38U – 34; Yak-38M – 52

History
- Manufactured: 1975–1981
- Introduction date: 11 August 1976
- First flight: 15 January 1971
- Retired: 1991

The Yakovlev Yak-38 (Russian: Яковлев Як-38; NATO reporting name: "Forger") was Soviet Naval Aviation's only operational VTOL strike aircraft in addition to being its first operational carrier-based fixed-wing aircraft. It was developed specifically for, and served almost exclusively on, the Kiev-class aircraft carriers (heavy aviation cruiser in Soviet classification).

== Design and development ==
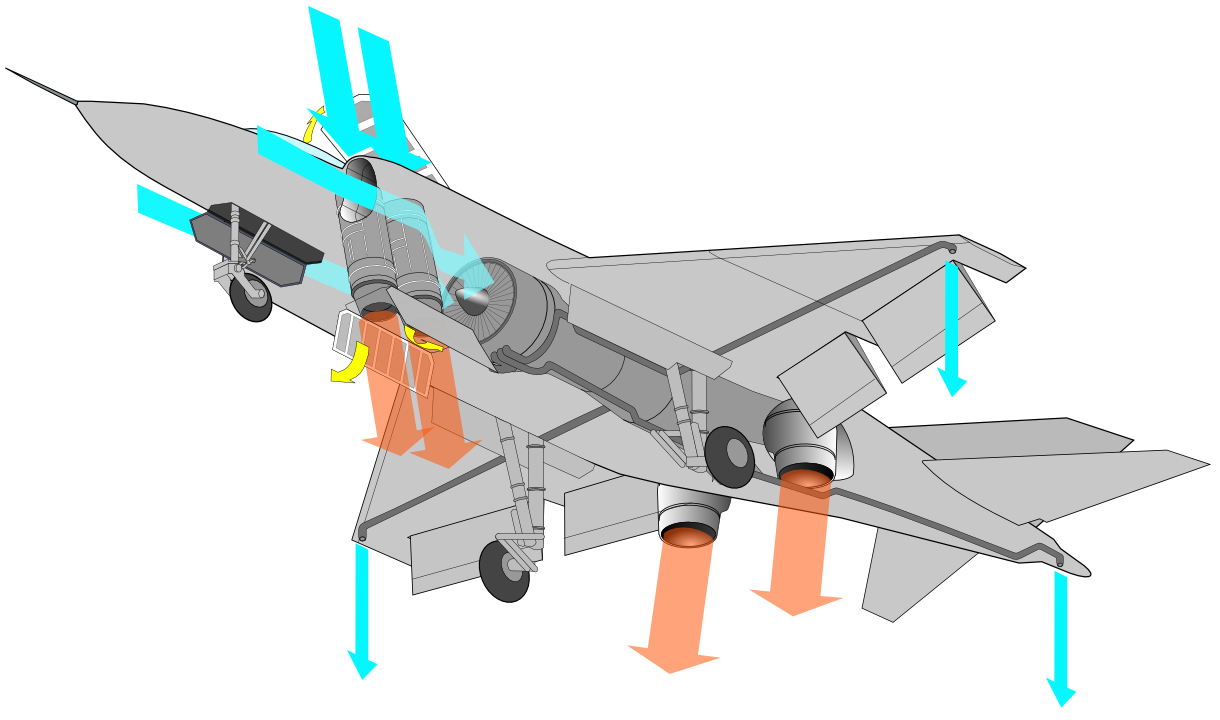
A diagram showing the lift forces on a Yak-38 in VTOL mode

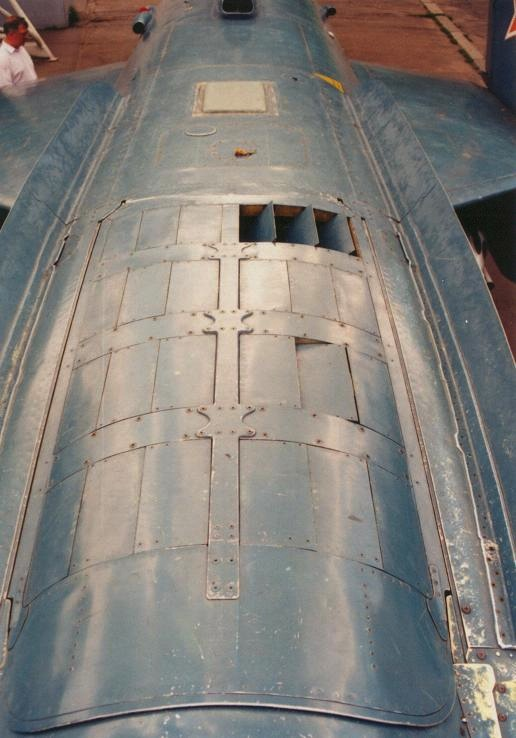
A close up view of the air intakes for the smaller VTOL engines

Designed by the A.S. Yakovlev Design Bureau, the first drawings showed a supersonic aircraft strongly resembling the Hawker P.1154 in study in the United Kingdom, but with two R27-300 engines. Supersonic performance would have implied many difficulties of development, and it was decided to initially develop a relatively simple aircraft limited to Mach 0.95. Although the Yak-38 and Yak-38M were developed from the land-based Yakovlev Yak-36, the aircraft had almost nothing in common.

The prototype VM-01 was finished on 14 April 1970. Though outwardly similar to the British Hawker Siddeley Harrier, it followed a completely different configuration. Together with a vectorable thrust engine in the rear used during flight, two smaller, and less powerful, engines were housed in the front portion of the fuselage and used only during takeoff and landing. (Note: The Harrier has only one engine, the cold and hot thrust being vectored through nozzles fore and aft respectively.)

The Yak-38 had an automatic ejection seat. If one of the takeoff engines failed or the aircraft rolled past 60 degrees the pilot was automatically ejected from the aircraft.

== Operational history ==
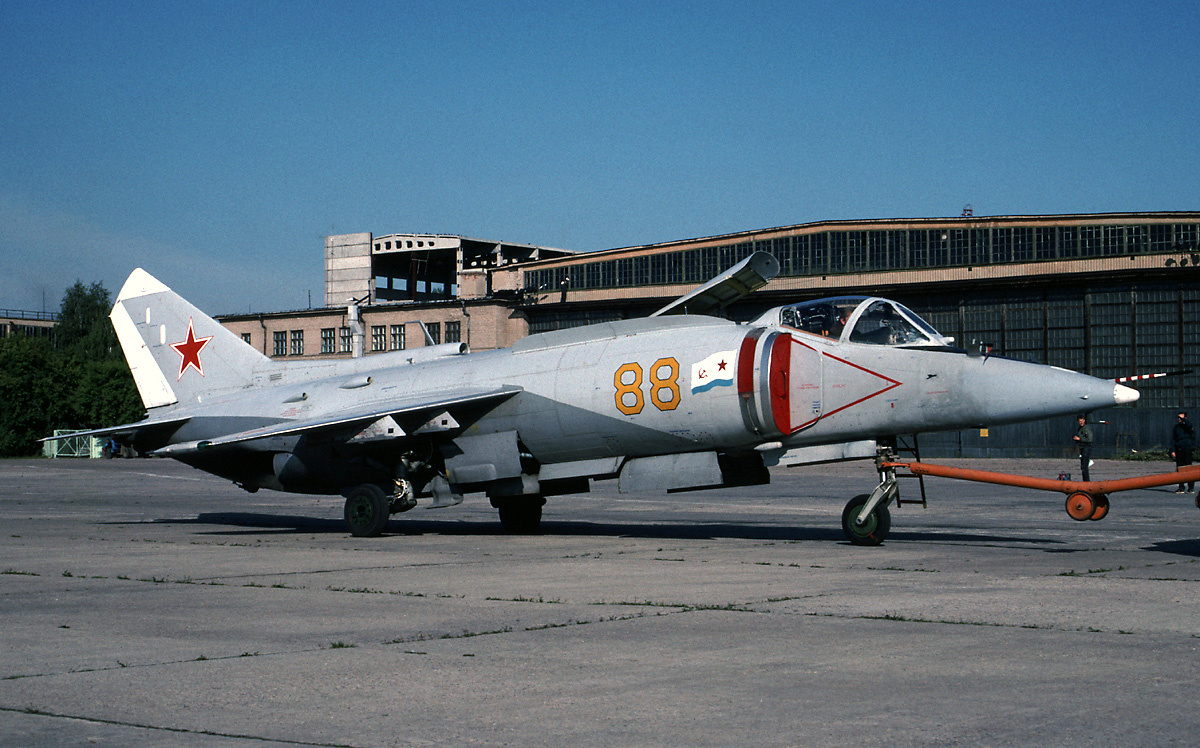
A Yak-38M at the MAKS airshow in 1993

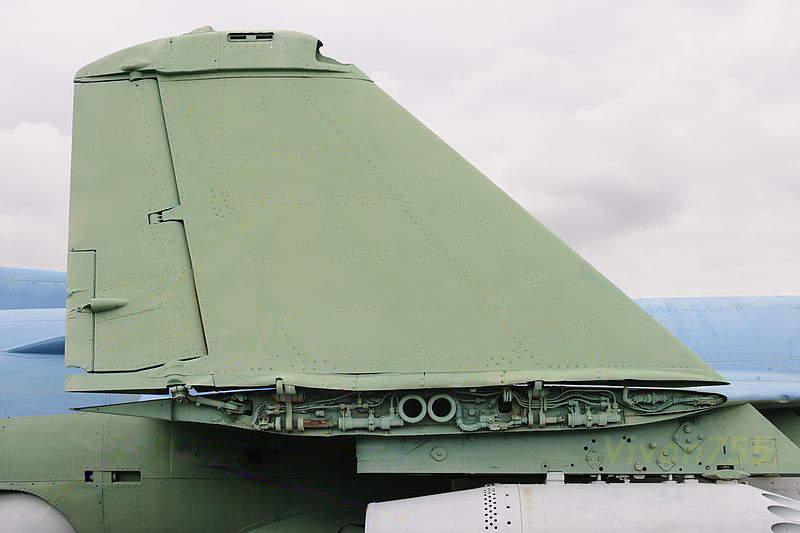
Folded wing of a Yak-38

The majority of Yak-36M initial production deliveries were to the 279 OKShAP (279 Otdelny Korabelny Shturmovoy Aviatsionny Polk, lit. '279th Independent Shipboard Attack Air Regiment'), initially based at Saky, a Soviet Naval Air Force's training centre in Crimea.

In July 1979, Minsk arrived in the Sea of Japan, where the vessel was home-ported at Strelok Bay, the Yak-38 component of its air wing thereafter being provided by the 311 OKShAP subordinate to the Pacific Fleet.

In September 1982, Novorossiysk – the third Kiev-class carrier – was commissioned. By now the V/STOL technique had been well practiced, and the resulting increase in the Yak-38's overall performance and capability was exploited during the passage of Novorossiysk from Severomorsk to join the Pacific Fleet. A pair of armed Yak-38s operating from Minsk intercepted aircraft from the U.S. carrier Enterprise over the Arabian Sea on 16 December 1982. This event marked the first time Soviet VTOL aircraft intercepted American aircraft while armed with missiles.

In a maritime context, the Yak-38 was not limited to the decks of Kiev. In September 1983, Soviet naval pilots operated from the civilian Ro-Ro vessel Agostinho Neto, and NII VVS (Air Force Scientific Test Institute) pilots conducted further tests from another Ro-Ro vessel, Nikolai Cherkasov. In both cases, use was made of a heat-resistant landing platform; further land-based trials tested the practicality of dispersed landing platforms, in a similar concept to the British Royal Air Force's Harrier operations in West Germany.

== Variants ==
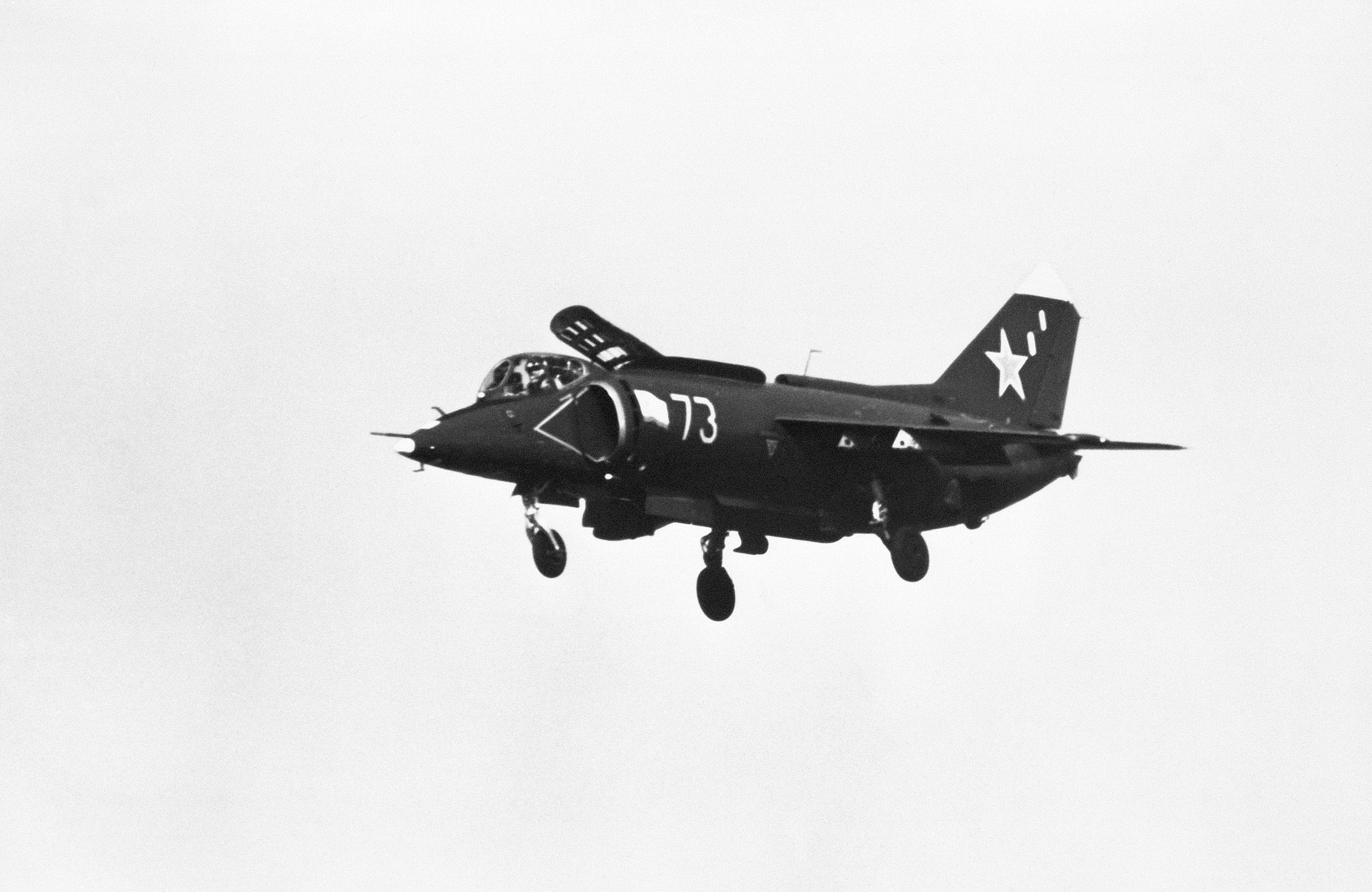
A Soviet Yak-38 Forger with its landing gear down

Yak-38U

Yak-36M "Forger"
The initial pre-production version, differing slightly from the Yak-38. It weighed 6,650 kg (14,660 lb) compared to the Yak-38's 7,370 kg (16,250 lb) and the engines were slightly less powerful.

Yak-38 "Forger-A"
The Yak-38 was the first production model, it first flew on 15 January 1971, and entered service with the Soviet Naval Aviation on 11 August 1976. A total of 143 Yak-38s were produced.

Yak-38M "Forger-A"
The Yak-38M was an upgraded version of the Yak-38, the main difference being the new Tumansky R-28V-300 and Rybinsk RD-38 engines. The maximum takeoff weight in VTOL was increased from 10,300 kg (22,700 lb) to 11,300 kg (24,900 lb) and was 12,000 kg (26,000 lb) in short takeoff mode. The air intakes were slightly widened and the underwing pylons reinforced to carry a 2,000 lb (910 kg) weapons load. The Yak-38M entered service with the Soviet Naval Aviation after June 1985; 50 Yak-38M were produced.

Yak-38U "Forger-B"
Two-seat training version of the Soviet Naval Aviation. This version differed from the basic aircraft in having an enlarged fuselage to accommodate a two-seat cockpit. The Yak-38U entered service on 15 November 1978. Thirty-eight Yak-38U were produced, the final aircraft was delivered in 1981.

=== Unbuilt projects ===
Yak-39
Multirole VTOL fighter/attack aircraft project dating from 1983, employing one R-28V-300 and two RD-48 engines, PRNK-39 avionics suite; S-41D multi-mode radar, larger wing, increased fuel capacity and expanded weapons options based around Shkval or Kaira PGM designation systems.

== Operators ==
Soviet Union

- Soviet Navy
  - Soviet Naval Aviation

Ukraine

- Ukrainian Navy
  - Ukrainian Naval Aviation (former operator, was only used in limited numbers as land-based attack aircraft after the collapse of the Soviet Union, no longer in service)

== Specifications (Yakovlev Yak-38M) ==
Data from Combat Aircraft since 1945

General characteristics

- Crew: 1
- Length: 16.37 m (53 ft 8 in)
- Wingspan: 7.32 m (24 ft 0 in)
- Height: 4.25 m (13 ft 11 in)
- Wing area: 18.5 m^{2} (199 sq ft)
- Empty weight: 7,385 kg (16,281 lb)
- Max takeoff weight: 11,300 kg (24,912 lb)
- Powerplant: 1 × Tumansky R-28 V-300 vectored-thrust turbofan engine, 66.7 kN (15,000 lbf) thrust for lift and cruise thrust
- Powerplant: 2 × Rybinsk (RKBM) RD-38 turbojet engines, 31.9 kN (7,200 lbf) thrust each lift-jets

Performance

- Maximum speed: 1,050 km/h (650 mph, 570 kn)
- Range: 1,300 km (810 mi, 700 nmi)
- Service ceiling: 11,000 m (36,000 ft)
- Rate of climb: 75 m/s (14,800 ft/min)

Armament

- Guns: 2 × 23 mm GSh-23L guns carried in a pair of UPK-23-250 pods fixed under the external pylons of wing planes (Note: There was also a centre-mounted ventral, integrated gunpod developed, designated as the VSPU-36. This also contained a GSh-23L gun, but its ammunition supply consisted of 160 rounds instead of the 250 as on the UPK-23-250 wing pods.)
- Hardpoints: 4 with a capacity of 2,000 kg (4,400 lb), with provisions to carry combinations of:
  - Rockets: various types of rockets up to 240 mm (9.4 in): 64 × 57 mm S-5s (4 × UB-16-57 or 2 × UB-32A launchers); 40 × 80 mm S-8s (2 × B-8M1 launchers); 2 × 240 mm S-24s
  - Missiles: 2 × Kh-23 (AS-7 Kerry) anti-ship or air-to-surface missiles; (Note: The Kh-23s required a "Delta-V" guidance pod on one of the inboard pylons.) two R-60 or R-60M (AA-8 Aphid) air-to-air missiles could be carried under the external pylons
  - Bombs: 2 × FAB-500 or 4 × FAB-250 or 8 × FAB-100 (Note: Three FAB-100s attached under every external pylon.) general-purpose bombs under pylons; two ZB-500 incendiary bombs; one RN-28 nuclear bomb and one FAB-250
  - Other: drop tanks

== See also ==
Related development

- Yakovlev Yak-36

Aircraft of comparable role, configuration, and era

- Dassault Balzac V
- Harrier series
- VFW VAK 191B
- Yakovlev Yak-141
