= Lyulka =

USSR aero engine design bureau and manufacturer

- Type: Aero-engine Design Bureau
- Successor: NPO Saturn
- Headquarters: Moscow, USSR
- Key people: Arkhip Mikhailovich Lyulka
- Products: Aircraft engines

Lyulka was a USSR aero engine design bureau and manufacturer from 1938 to the 1990s, when manufacturing and design elements were integrated as NPO Saturn based at Rybinsk. The Lyulka design bureau had its roots in the "Kharkiv Aviation Institute" ( Ukrainian SSR ) where Arkhip Mikhailovich Lyulka was working with a team designing the ATsN (Agregat Tsentralnovo Nadduva - Centralised supercharger) installation on the Petlyakov Pe-8 bomber. Lyul'ka was responsible for designing the first Soviet gas turbine engines. Preferring to steer away from copying captured German equipment, it succeeded in producing home grown engines.

== Engines ==
Summary of engines built/designed by Lyulka
Model name	Date	Type	Thrust (kg) / Power (eshp)	Fitted to
RTD-1/VDR-2	1938	Two-stage centrifugal compressor Turbojet	500 kg estimated	Test-bed only; planned for the KhAI-2
S-18/VDR-3	1945	Axial flow compressor Turbojet	1,250 kg	Gu-VRD project
TR-1	1946	8-stage Axial flow compressor Turbojet	1,300 kg	Alekseyev I-211, Ilyushin Il-22, Sukhoi Su-10, Sukhoi Su-11
TR-1A	1947	8-stage Axial flow compressor Turbojet	1,500 kg	
TR-2	1947			projected growth version of TR-1
TR-3/AL-5	1949	7-stage Axial-flow Turbojet	4,600 kg (at qualification in 1950)	Il-30, Il-46, La-190, Aircraft '86', Yak-1000, Su-17, Aircraft '150'
TR-7	1950s	supersonic compressor prototype Turbojet		Prototype for AL-7
AL-7	1954	9-stage supersonic compressor Turbojet	6,500 kg	Be-10, Il-54, Su-7, Su-9, Su-11, Tu-28/Tu-128, Tu-98, Kh-20
AL-21	1961	Axial Turbojet	11,000 kg	Su-17, Su-24, MiG-23, T-10
AL-31	1981	Twin-spool Turbofan 0.6 bypass ratio.	13,300 kg	Su-27, Su-30, Su-33, Su-34, Su-35, Su-37
