= Arkhip Lyulka =

Soviet Engineer and jet engine designer (1908–1984)

- Архип Люлька
- Born: Arkhip Mikhailovich Lyulka; 23 March [O.S. 10 March] 1908; Savarka village, Kanev uezd, Kiev Governorate, Russian Empire
- Died: 1 June 1984 (aged 76); Moscow, Soviet Union
- Known for: Lyulka-Saturn
- Awards: Lenin Award; Order of Lenin; Order of the October Revolution; Hero of Socialist Labor
- Scientific career
- Fields: Jet engine designer

Arkhip Mykhailovich Lyulka (Russian: Архип Михайлович Люлька, Ukrainian: Архип Михайлович Люлька; 23 March 1908 – 1 June 1984) was a Soviet engineer and designer of jet engines, head of the OKB Lyulka, member of the Academy of Sciences of the Soviet Union.

== Biography ==
He was born in Savarka village in the Kiev Governorate of Russian Empire (now Savarka, Kyiv Oblast, Ukraine). He was educated in the Savarka village school and graduated from the Kiev Polytechnic Institute in 1931 (Mikhail Kravchuk was his teacher and mentor in both institutions). He then worked for two years in the Kharkov turbogen factory.

Lyulka was a Soviet aero-engine design bureau and manufacturer from 1938 to the 1990s, when manufacturing and design elements were integrated as NPO Saturn based at Rybinsk. The Lyulka design bureau had its roots in the Kharkov Aviation Institute in the Ukrainian SSR, where Lyulka was working with a team designing the ATsN (Agregat Tsentralnovo Nadduva - Centralised supercharger) installation on the Petlyakov Pe-8 bomber. Lyulka was responsible for designing the first Soviet gas turbine engines, preferring to steer away from copying captured German equipment, he succeeded in producing home grown engines.

In 1939-1941 Lyulka elaborated the design for the World's first turbofan engine, and acquired a patent for this new invention on 22 April 1941. Although several prototypes were built and ready for state tests, Lyulka was forced to abandon his research and evacuate to the Ural mountains as the Great Patriotic War began with the Nazi invasion of the Soviet Union.

In 1941-42, Lyulka worked in a tank factory in Chelyabinsk as a Diesel-engine engineer. However, after the failure of the Soviet rocket engine project of 1942, Joseph Stalin recalled Lyulka among other scientists working on jet engines to resume their work in Moscow.

From 1945 onwards, the Soviet jet engine project split into two: the OKB MiG based their development on indigenous technology combined with German trophy aircraft and Western technology. Lyulka, however, refused any foreign influence and continued his own research. In 1945-47 he designed the first Soviet jet engine, TR-1, which passed the whole cycle of state tests with success. Pavel Sukhoi (head of the OKB Sukhoi) immediately proposed to install the new engine on his Su-11 jets, starting a long collaborative work with Lyulka. He later designed the AL-5, AL-7, AL-21 turbojet engines which were installed on the Su-7, Su-17, Su-20, Su-24, MiG-23 and other Soviet military aircraft. Lyulka also designed the upper stage engines for the Soviet Moon rocket N1.

In the 1970s, Pavel Sukhoi asked Lyulka to design a new engine with unorthodox characteristics for installation on the projected Su-27. The challenge was taken up, and although Pavel Sukhoi died in 1974, his work was carried on by his successors and colleagues, including Lyulka. The primary difficulty in designing this aircraft appeared to be in the engines, which had to be constantly redesigned and upgraded. As a result of the intensive work of Lyulka and his team, the work on the new engine, AL-31F, was finally accomplished in the early 1980s.

He died on 1 June 1984 in Moscow.

== Achievements ==
Overall, the achievements of Arkhip Lyulka have become decisive for Soviet Union and its allies. To this day, the patent for double jet turbofan engines widely used in all sectors of the world's aviation belongs to him. The AL-31 alone has become the cornerstone for various international developments in both civilian and military sectors, now undertaken by NPO Saturn, the heir to Lyulka's OKB.

== Engines ==
Summary of engines built/designed by Lyulka
Model name	Date	Type	Thrust (kg) / Power (eshp)	Fitted to
RTD-1/VDR-2	1938	Two-stage centrifugal compressor Turbojet	500 kg estimated	Test-bed only
S-18/VDR-3	1945	Axial flow compressor Turbojet	1,250 kg	Gu-VRD project
TR-1	1946	8-stage Axial flow compressor Turbojet	1,300 kg	Alekseyev I-21, Ilyushin Il-22, Sukhoi Su-10, Sukhoi Su-11 (1947)
TR-1A	1947	8-stage Axial flow compressor Turbojet	1,500 kg	
TR-2	1947			projected growth version of TR-1
TR-3 and AL-5	1949	7-stage Axial-flow Turbojet	4,600 kg (at qualification in 1950)	Il-30, Il-46, Lavochkin Aircraft 190, Tu-86, Yak-1000, Su-17 (1949), "Aircraft 150"
TR-7	1950s	supersonic compressor prototype of the AL-7		Prototype for AL-7
AL-7	1954	9-stage supersonic compressor Turbojet	6,500 kg	Il-54, Su-7B, Tu-98, Su
AL-21	1961	14-stage Axial compressor with variable stator blades	11,000 kg	Yak-38, Tu-28/Tu-128, Su-17, Su-24
AL-31	1976	Twin-spool Turbofan 0.6 bypass ratio.	13,300 kg	Su-27, Su-30, Su-34, Su-35, Su-47 Berkut

== Awards ==
- Hero of Socialist Labour (1957)
- Lenin Prize (1976)
- Three Orders of Lenin (1947, 1957, 1967)
- Order of the October Revolution (1971)
- Two Orders of the Red Banner of Labour (1945, 1975)
- Two Stalin Prizes (1948, 1951)

== See also ==
- NPO Saturn
- Kyiv Polytechnic Institute
- Kharkiv Aviation Institute
