= Mikoyan-Gurevich I-350 =

I-350

General information
- Type: Experimental fighter aircraft
- National origin: Soviet Union
- Manufacturer: Mikoyan-Gurevich
- Number built: 2

History
- First flight: 16 June 1951

The Mikoyan-Gurevich I-350 (Samolet M), was a Soviet Cold War-era experimental fighter aircraft. It was the first Soviet aircraft able to maintain supersonic speed.

== Design and development ==
From 1947, work began on a new axial-flow turbojet by OKB-165, led by Arkhip Mikhailovich Lyulka. OKB Mikoyan-Guryevich designed the I-350 around this engine, the 46.107 kN (10,365 lbf) Lyul'ka TR-3A (redesignated as the Lyulka AL-5). Resembling a scaled-up MiG-17, the I-350 had a long slim fuselage, mid-set 57° swept wings and a wide-chord fin mounting a tailplane at half-span.

Given the OKB designation Izdeliye M, it was the first Soviet fighter able to fly stably at supersonic speeds. Redesignated as the I-350, the I-350M-1 first prototype was fitted with a RP-1 Izumrud airborne interception radar and the second prototype, I-350M-2, was fitted with a Korshun airborne interception radar.

== Operational history ==
The I-350M-1 first flew on 16 June 1951, piloted by Grigoriy A. Sedov, but the engine failed shortly after takeoff, precipitating a hydraulic system failure. Despite battling very heavy control forces, the pilot made a successful landing after lowering the landing gear using the emergency undercarriage extension system. Four more test flights were made, with very poor engine reliability, before the I-350 programme was terminated in August 1951.

== Specifications (I-350) ==
Data from MiG: Fifty Years of Secret Aircraft Design, Gunston

General characteristics

- Crew: 1
- Length: 16.652 m (54 ft 8 in)
- Wingspan: 9.73 m (31 ft 11 in)
- Wing area: 36 m^{2} (390 sq ft)
- Airfoil: root: TsAGI SR-12s; tip: TsAGI SR-7s
- Empty weight: 6,124 kg (13,501 lb)
- Gross weight: 8,000 kg (17,637 lb)
- Max takeoff weight: 8,710 kg (19,202 lb)
- Fuel capacity: 800 L (180 imp gal; 210 US gal)
- Powerplant: 1 × Lyulka AL-5A turbojet engine, 46.09 kN (10,360 lbf) thrust

Performance

- Maximum speed: 1,260 km/h (780 mph, 680 kn)
- Maximum speed: Mach 1.02
- Range: 1,120 km (700 mi, 600 nmi)
- Ferry range: 1,620 km (1,010 mi, 870 nmi)
- Service ceiling: 16,600 m (54,500 ft)
- Time to altitude: 5,000 m (16,000 ft) in 1.1 minutes

10,000 m (33,000 ft) in 2.6 minutes

- Thrust/weight: 0.57

Armament

- Guns:

- 1 × 37 mm Nudelman N-37 autocannon
- 2 × 23 mm Nudelman-Rikhter NR-23 autocannon

- Hardpoints: 1 centre-line hardpoint

== See also ==
Aircraft of comparable role, configuration, and era

- North American F-100 Super Sabre
- Supermarine 545
- Dassault Super Mystère B2
