= Genrikh Novozhilov =

Soviet and Russian aircraft designer (1925–2019)

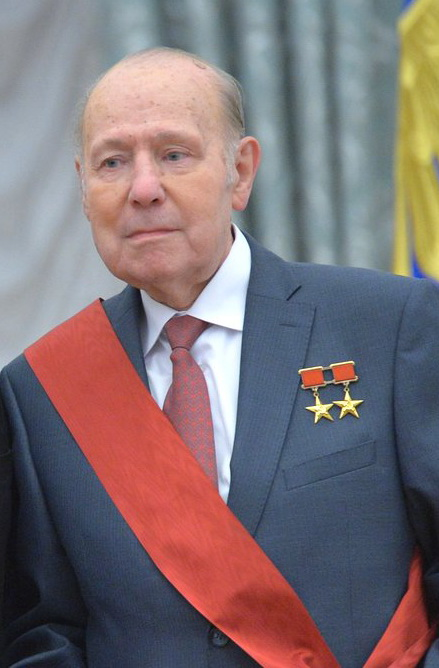
Genrikh Novozhilov in 2016

Genrikh Vasilyevich Novozhilov (Russian: Ге́нрих Васи́льевич Новожи́лов; 27 October 1925 – 28 April 2019) was a Soviet and Russian aircraft designer. He was a key designer of multiple Ilyushin passenger aircraft including the Il-18, Il-62, Il-76, and Il-96.

== Family and early life ==
Novozhilov was born on 27 October 1925 in Moscow, Soviet Union, the son of military engineer Vasily Vasilyevich Sokolov, and his wife Iraida Ivanova Novozhilova, a servicewoman. The family lived near Clean Ponds, where one of his neighbours in the communal apartment worked in civil aviation. His parents divorced in 1937, with Novozhilov raised by his mother and attending School No. 233 V.R. Menzhinsky. The young Novozhilov aspired to be a pilot, but in September 1939 he suffered a severe leg injury, having to undergo several operations at the Botkin Hospital. He later recalled that "They plowed up the leg from the knee to the foot," ending his dreams of being a pilot. He was also keen on photography, with some of his work exhibited at the 1st All-Union Children's Photo Exhibition in 1939. After the German invasion of the Soviet Union in 1941, Novozhilov and his mother were temporarily evacuated to Penza. They returned to Moscow in August 1942, where Novozhilov began work at the physics department of the Moscow Aviation Institute, and a year later became a student in the aircraft-construction department. Here he first met Sergey Ilyushin when Ilyushin attended the faculty's graduation banquet. Novozhilov would later recall Ilyushin's spontaneity, and his skill at dancing and singing.

== Ilyushin designer ==
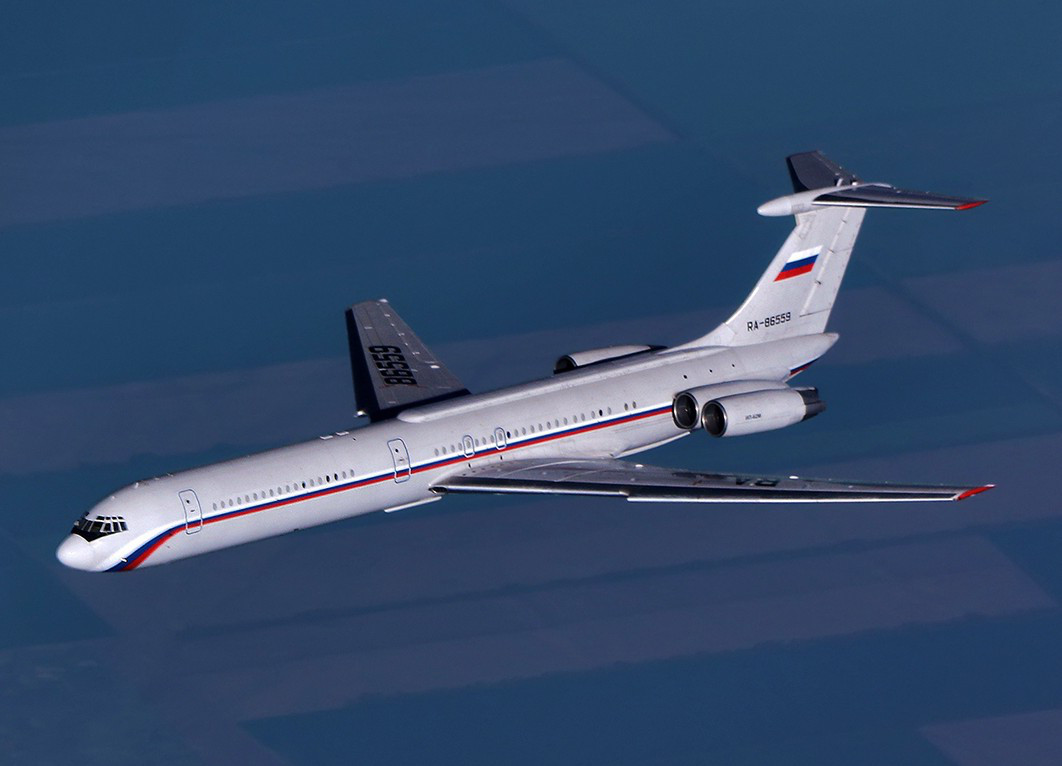
The Il-62, one of the projects that Novozhilov worked to develop

Novozhilov then began an internship at OKB-240, the design bureau overseen by Sergey Ilyushin. He was duly enrolled as a design engineer on 1 July 1948, with a salary of 900 rubles. He graduated from the Moscow Aviation Institute in 1949 and continued to work at the bureau. He participated in the design of the Il-14 passenger aircraft, as well as military planes including the attack aircraft Il-40 and the bombers Il-46 and Il-54. During his early years Novozhilov specialised in fuselage design, under the tutelage of Valery Bogor. The Ilyushin design bureau was often in competition with the designs produced by Tupolev design bureau. Ilyushin designs that Novozhilov helped to work on at this time included the Il-14 passenger aircraft, the two-seater attack jet Il-40 and the bomber Il-46. Eventually Tupolev's rival offering, the Tu-14, was adopted for the Soviet Air Forces instead of the Il-46. Novozhilov instead worked as lead engineer on the Il-54. The Il-54 was also cancelled by the Soviet government in the mid-1950s with only two prototypes built. By the late 1950s, with Soviet interests fixed on the Space Race, the Ilyushin design bureau faced closure. In 1956 Novozhilov was elected secretary of the bureau's party committee, but returned to engineering in September 1958, being tasked as appointed deputy chief designer of the passenger aircraft Il-18, and their operation with Aeroflot. Novozhilov attempted to avoid the appointment, arguing that he had not been involved with building the aircraft, nor was he very familiar with their operation. Ilyushin was unconvinced. Novozhilov therefore had to travel widely in his new capacity, as well as working with emergency commissions after accidents to determine their causes, and develop preventative measures. Novozhilov would later admit that this proved particularly useful experience for him, and was necessary for developing his design interests.

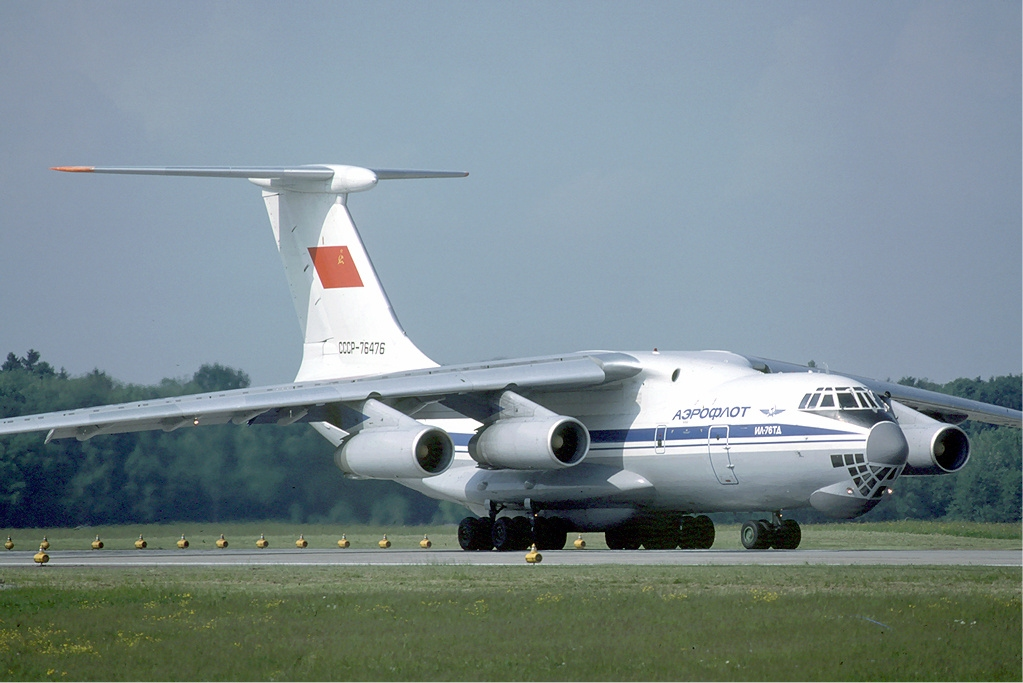
The Il-76, a major design success for Ilyushin, and one which Novozhilov shepherded into service

In 1964 Novozhilov was appointed first deputy general designer and tasked with overseeing the development and mass production of the Il-62. His success at this led to the award of the Lenin Prize in early 1970 to members of the Ilyushin bureau, including Novozhilov. On 26 April 1971 Novozhilov was awarded the title of Hero of Socialist Labour after the completion of the state's eighth five-year plan. In mid 1970 Sergey Ilyushin, then aged 77, announced his retirement and on 28 July, in the presence of Aviation Industry Minister Pyotr Vasilyevich Dementyev, Novozhilov was named as his successor and general designer of the Moscow bureau of the "Strela" works. On 25 March the following year the Il-76, a military transport aircraft, began its test flights at Khodynka Aerodrome, overseen by Novozhilov with Sergei Ilyushin in attendance. It became the most popular passenger and military transport aircraft of the Soviet Union.

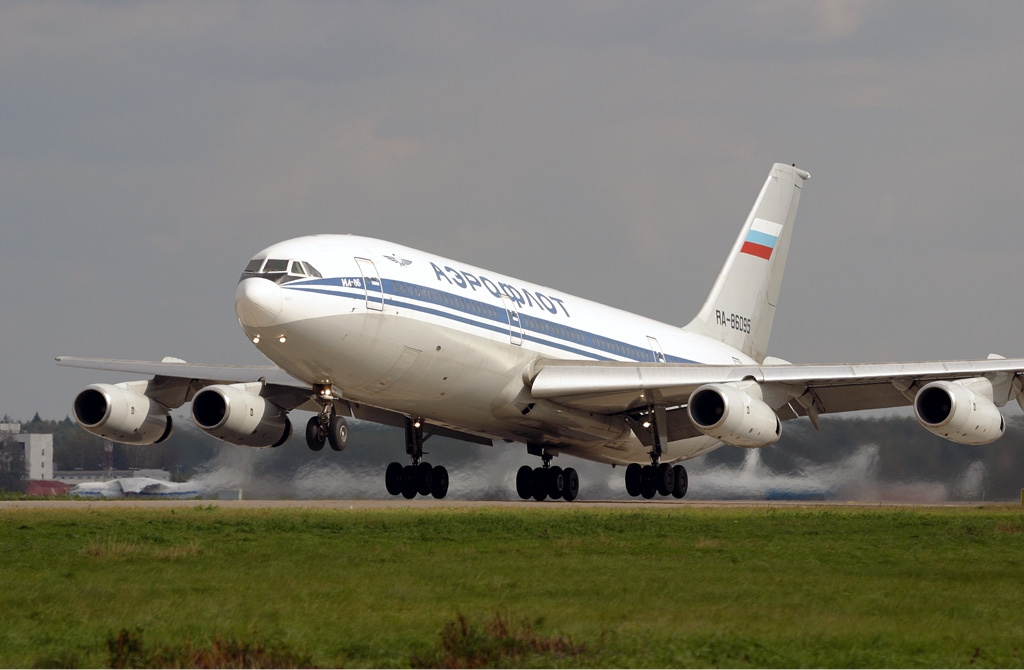
The Il-86. The Soviet Union's first wide-body passenger aircraft, developed under Novozhilov's time as head of Ilyushin.

Since 1969 the design bureau had been developing the first Russian wide-body passenger aircraft, the Il-86. There was now great demand for long-distance, high-capacity civil airplanes, and the government had stipulated a nominal range of 2,400 kilometres. As Novozhilov was returning from Sochi with Aviation Industry Minister Pyotr Dementyev and the Minister of Civil Aviation Boris Bugayev, he noted that the bureau was investigating potentially doubling the range of the Il-86. The ministers promptly made him sign to commit the new aircraft to a new stipulated range of 5,000 kilometres. After considering developments of the IL-62 and IL-76 designs, Novozhilov and his team produced a completely new design capable of such range while carrying 350 passengers. The first testflight of the new IL-86 took place on 22 December 1976. After it was successfully concluded, Novozhilov promptly ordered another the following day, and then three further ones before the New Year. He co-founded the MAKS Air Show, and led the work on the long-haul IL-96-300 and Il-114 turboprop. Since 2006, Novozhilov served as Chief Science Adviser to Ilyushin.

== Honours and awards ==
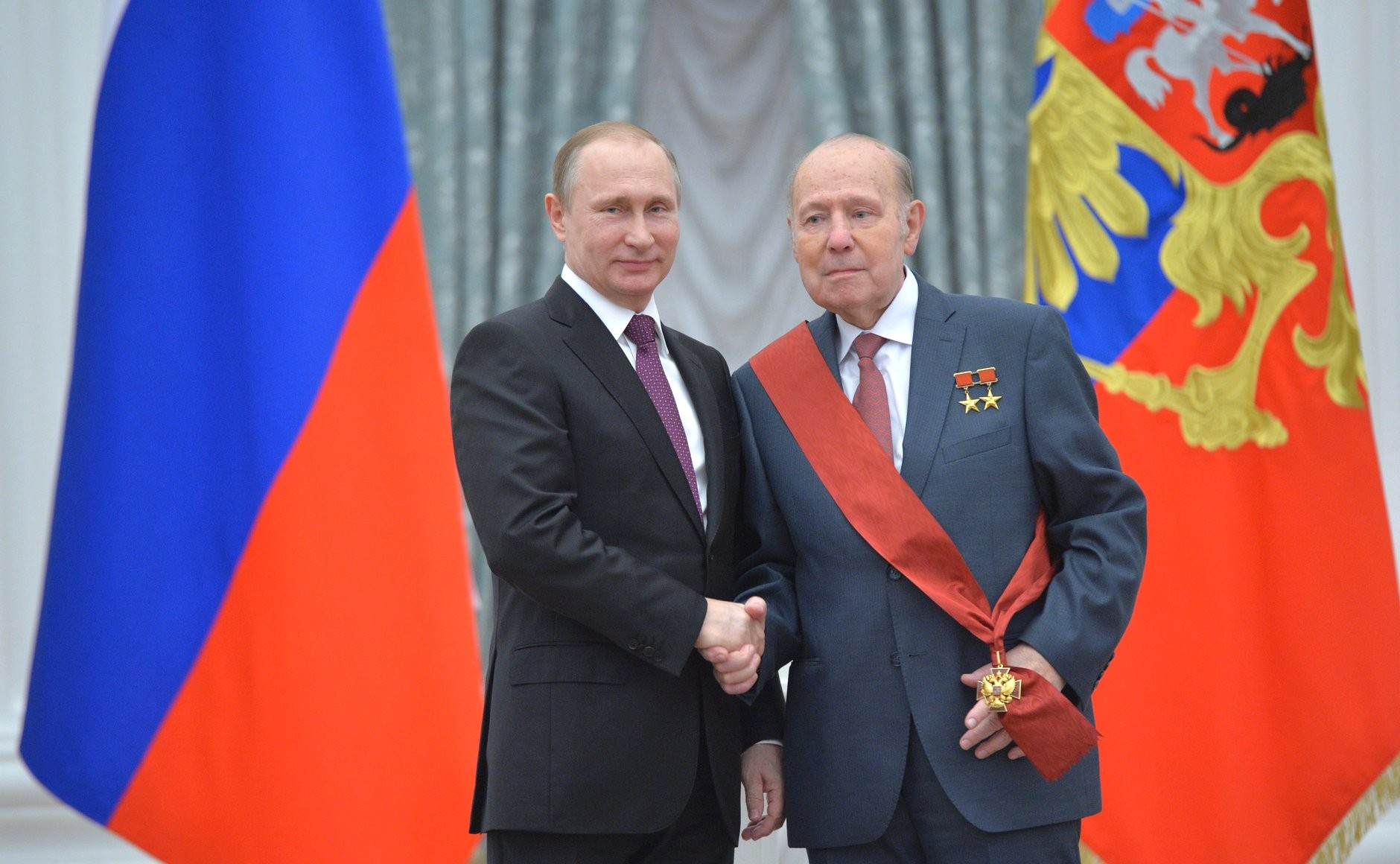
Novozhilov with Vladimir Putin on 10 March 2016, at the award of the Order "For Merit to the Fatherland" First Class

Novozhilov had been a corresponding member of the Academy of Sciences of the Soviet Union since 15 March 1979, and on 26 December 1984 he was elected a full member for his work in the separation of mechanics and control processes. His scientific work was related to "aerodynamic research, the reliability of complex structures, the development of fundamentally new approaches to the so-called manufacturability of the machines and mechanisms being developed". Novozhilov held some 150 patents on various design innovations, and on 23 June 1981 he was awarded his second Hero of Socialist Labour.

Novozhilov served as a deputy of the Supreme Soviet of the Soviet Union from 1974 to 1989, then as a People's Deputy of the USSR from 1989. He became a member of the Central Committee of the Communist Party of the Soviet Union in 1986. As well as his two Heroes of Socialist Labour, Novozhilov held a number of other state awards. He was awarded the Order of Lenin three times, on 10 February 1969, 26 April 1971 and 23 June 1981; the Order of the October Revolution on 27 October 1975; the Order of the Red Banner of Labour on 22 July 1966; the Order of the Badge of Honour on 7 December 1957; and the Order of Friendship of Peoples on 29 December 1992. He also received the Order of Holy Prince Daniel of Moscow Third Class and the Order "For Merit to the Fatherland" in three classes.

== Personal life and death ==
He married Lyudmila Ivanovna Lisina, a philologist, on 23 April 1966. The couple had a son, Sergey Genrikhovich, born in 1967, who became an aircraft engineer. Late in life Genrikh Novozhilov listed his interests as tennis and photography.

Novozhilov died on 28 April 2019 at the age of 93. He was buried on 7 May at the Federal Military Memorial Cemetery.
