= Ilyushin Il-28 =

Soviet bomber aircraft family

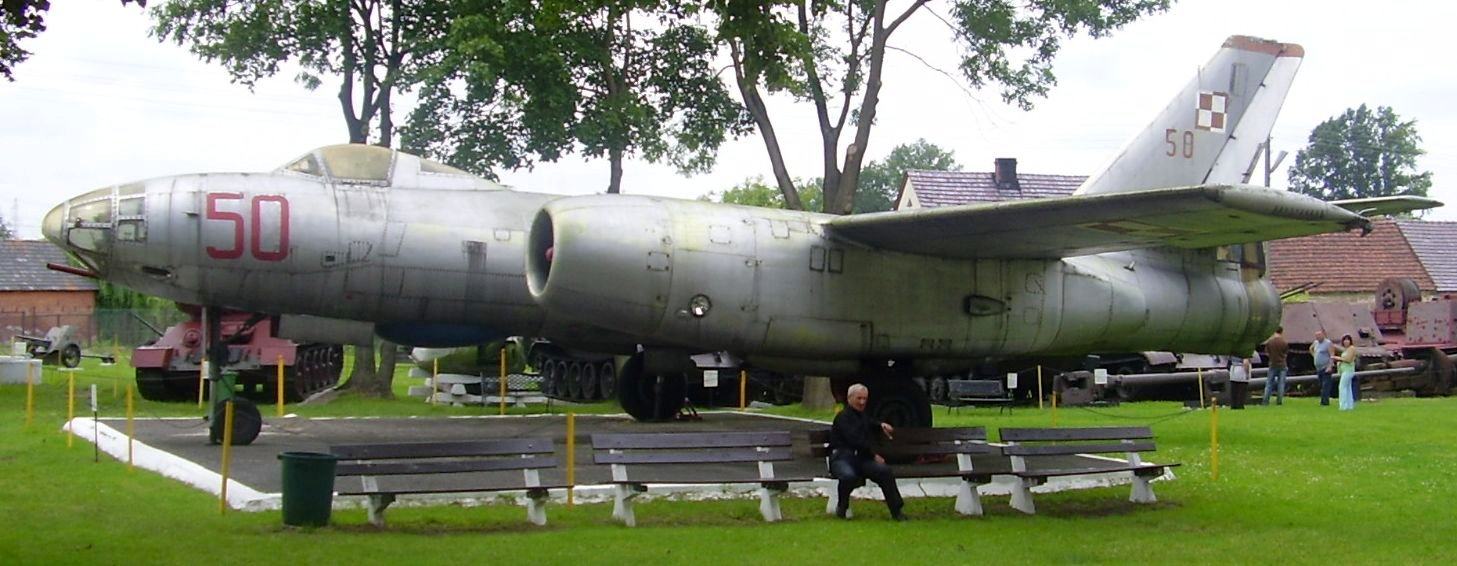
- Il-28 in Polish Air Force colours, with a man for scale

General information
- Type: Medium bomber
- National origin: Soviet Union
- Manufacturer: Ilyushin; Harbin Aircraft Manufacturing Corporation (H-5)
- Status: In service with the Korean People's Air Force
- Primary users: Korean People's Army Air Force Soviet Air Forces (historical); People's Liberation Army Air Force (historical); Czechoslovak Air Force (historical)
- Number built: over 6,635

History
- Introduction date: 1950
- First flight: 8 July 1948
- Retired: 1980s (Soviet Union)
- Developed into: Ilyushin Il-30

The Ilyushin Il-28 (Russian: Илью́шин Ил-28; NATO reporting name: Beagle) is a medium-range jet bomber, originally manufactured for the Soviet Air Forces, in service since 1950. It was the Soviet Union's first such aircraft to enter large-scale production. Total production in the USSR was 6,316 aircraft.

The Harbin H-5 was a variant built in the People's Republic of China (without license). Over 319 were built, as well as 187 HJ-5 training variants. The Korean People's Army Air Force is the only remaining operator, with approximately 80 aircraft, believed to be a mix of Soviet and Chinese models.

The bomber remained in frontline nuclear and conventional roles for the USSR until the late 1950s, carrying the RDS-4, and for China until the 1990s. Il-28s triggered worldwide attention during the Cuban Missile Crisis, where they were deployed with tactical nuclear bombs. They were also supplied to the Warsaw Pact; both the USSR and Hungarian rebels flew them during the 1956 Hungarian Revolution. China's H-5s saw combat in the First Taiwan Strait Crisis and the 1959 Tibetan uprising. Egypt used Il-28s in the War of Attrition and North Yemen civil war, including to drop chemical weapons. They also saw extensive combat use by the Democratic Republic of Afghanistan, Ba'athist Iraq, Nigeria, and brief use by North Vietnam.

The Il-28 has the USAF/DoD reporting name "Type 27" and NATO reporting name "Beagle", while the Il-28U trainer variant has the USAF/DoD reporting name "Type 30" and NATO reporting name Mascot.

== Design and development ==
After several attempts at a four-engined bomber (the Lyulka TR-1 powered Ilyushin Il-22 and the unbuilt Rolls-Royce Derwent powered Ilyushin Il-24), the Ilyushin Design Bureau began development of a new jet-powered tactical bomber in late 1947. Western intelligence focused on the four-engine developments while the twin-engine Ilyushin Il-28 was created to meet a requirement for a bomber to carry a 3,000 kilograms (6,600 lb) bombload at 800 kilometres per hour (500 mph). The new design took advantage of the sale of several Rolls-Royce Nene jet engines by Great Britain to the Soviet Union, which allowed Soviet engineers to quickly produce an unlicensed copy of the Nene, the RD-45, with Ilyushin designing the new bomber around two RD-45s.

The Il-28 was smaller than the previous designs and carried a crew of only three (pilot, navigator and gunner). It was also smaller than the competing design from the Tupolev design bureau, the three-engined (i.e. two Nenes and a Rolls-Royce Derwent) Tupolev Tu-73, which had been started long before the Ilyushin project, and flew before the design of the Il-28 was approved.

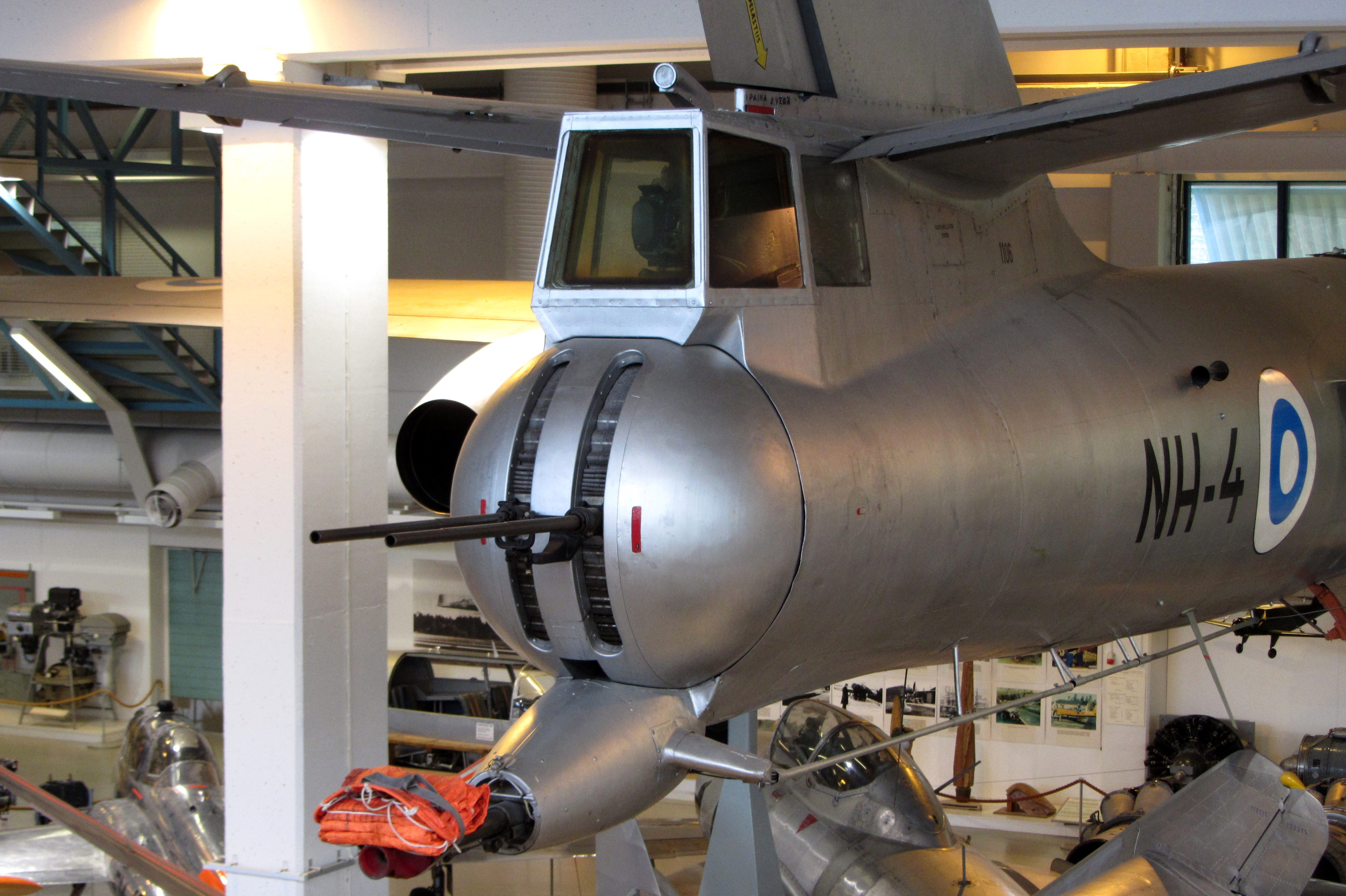
An Il-28 in Finnish colors, showing the tail mounted gun turret with a window for the rear gunner. This aircraft was configured as a target tug; the device containing the orange target is the target-deploy mechanism

The Il-28 design was conventional in layout, with high, unswept wings and a swept horizontal tail and fin. The engines were carried in bulky nacelles slung directly under the wings. The nosewheel retracted rearwards, while the mainwheels retracted forwards into the engine nacelles. The crew of three were accommodated in separate, pressurised compartments. The navigator, who also acted as bombardier, was accommodated in the glazed nose compartment and was provided with an OPB-5 bombsight based on the American Norden bombsight of the Second World War, while the pilot sat under a sideways opening bubble canopy with an armoured windscreen. The gunner sat in a separate compartment at the rear of the fuselage, operating a power-driven turret armed with two Nudelman-Suranov NS-23 23 mm cannons with 250 rounds each. In service, the turret was sometimes removed as a weight-saving measure. While the pilot and navigator sat on ejector seats, the gunner had to parachute out of a hatch in the floor in the event of an emergency. Two more fixed, forward-firing 23 mm cannon with 100 rounds each were mounted under the nose and fired by the pilot, while a bomb bay was located in the fuselage, capable of holding four 100 kg (220 lb) bombs in individual containers, or single large bombs of up to 3,000 kg (6,600 lb) slung from a beam in the bomb bay.

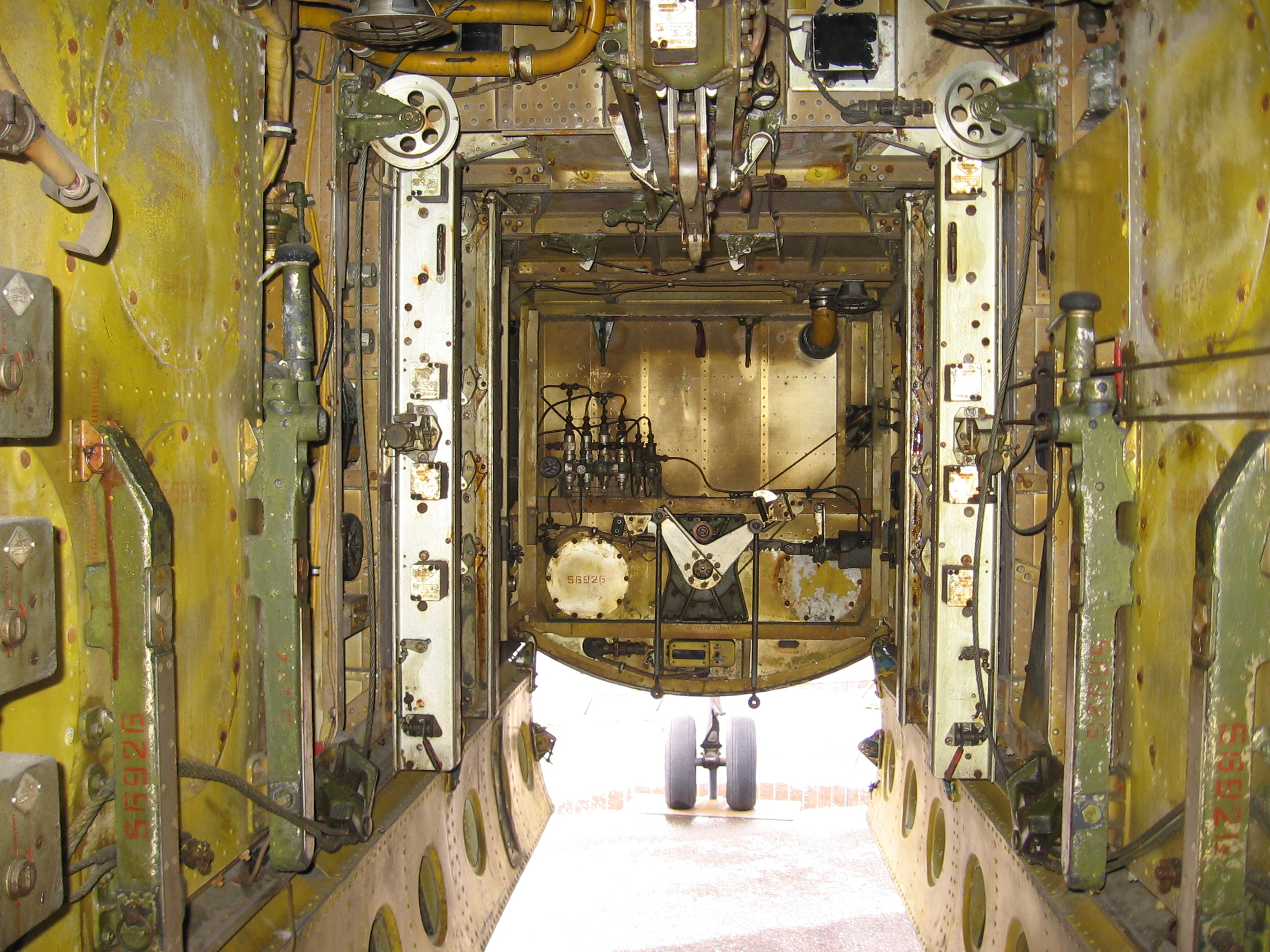
Il-28 bomb bay

One unusual design feature of the Il-28 was that the wings and tail were split horizontally through the centre of the wing, while the fuselage was split vertically at the centreline, allowing the separate parts to be built individually and fitted out with systems before being bolted together to complete assembly of the aircraft. This slightly increased the weight of the aircraft structure, but eased manufacture and proved to be more economical.

The first prototype, powered by two imported Nenes, made its maiden flight on 8 July 1948, with Vladimir Kokkinaki at the controls. Testing was successful, with the Il-28 demonstrating good handling and reaching a speed of 833 km/h (518 mph). It was followed on 30 December 1948 by the second prototype, with Soviet built RD-45 engines replacing the Nenes. After the completion of state tests in early 1949 the aircraft was ordered into large scale production on 14 May 1949, with the Klimov VK-1, an improved version of the RD-45 to be used in order to improve the aircraft's performance. The first pre-production aircraft with VK-1 engines flew on 8 August 1949, and featured reshaped engine nacelles to reduce drag, while the radome for the navigation radar was moved from the rear fuselage to just aft of the nosewheel.

Full production in three factories started in September 1949, with service deliveries starting in early 1950, allowing 25 Il-28s to be displayed at the Moscow May Day parade of 1950 (as ordered by Joseph Stalin when it was ordered into production in 1949). The Il-28 soon became the standard tactical bomber in the Soviet forces and was widely exported.

== Operational history ==
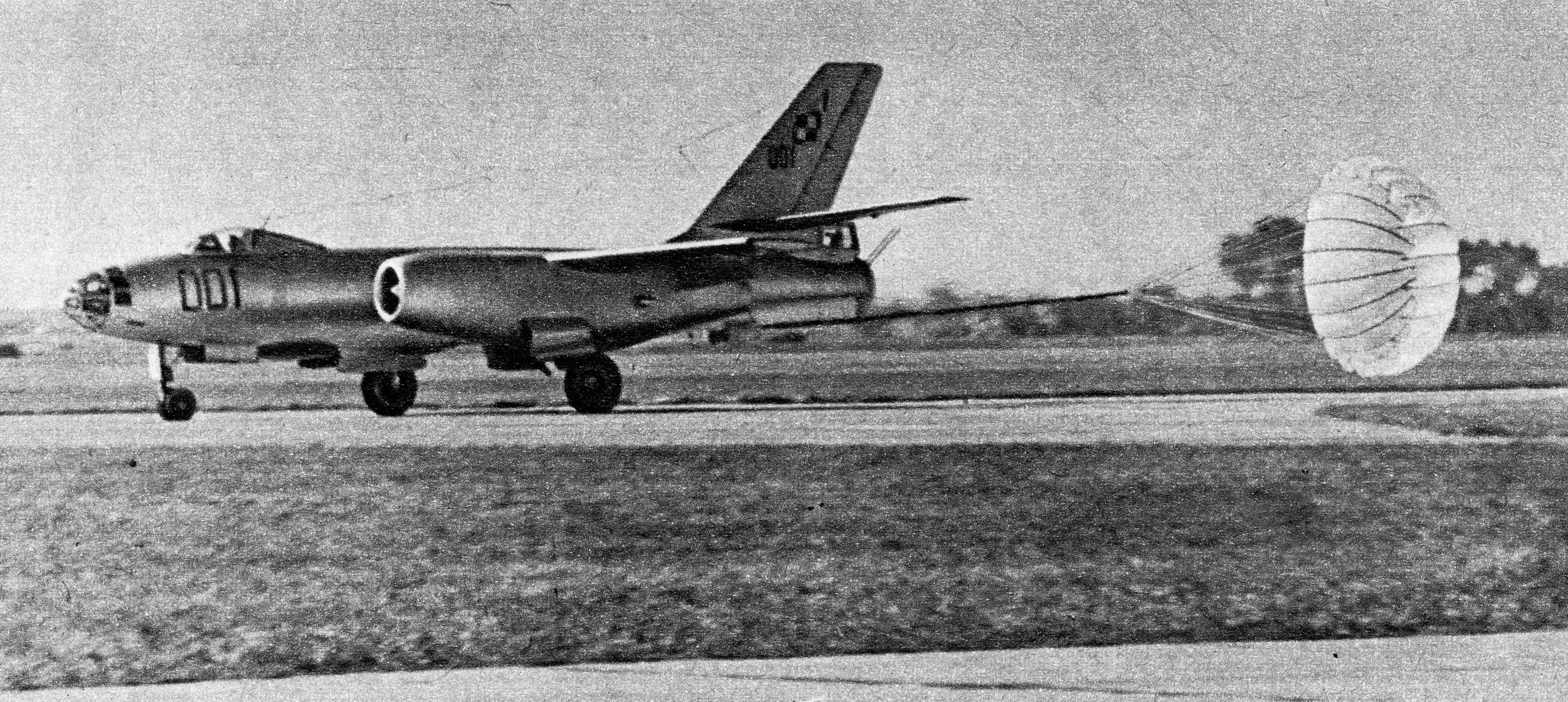
Polish Il-28 landing, 1959

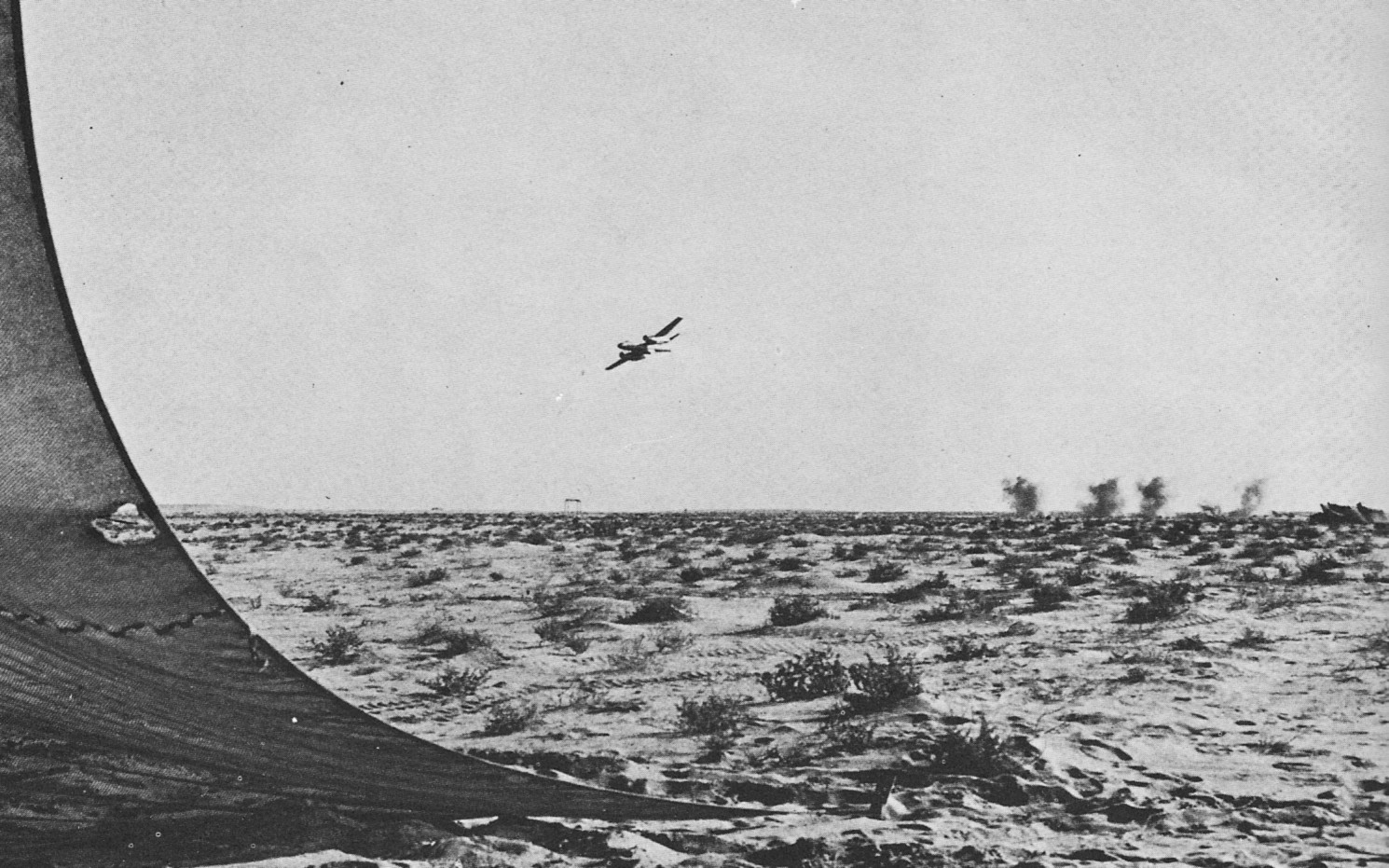
Egyptian Il-28 strikes IDF positions in Sinai during the War of Attrition (1967).

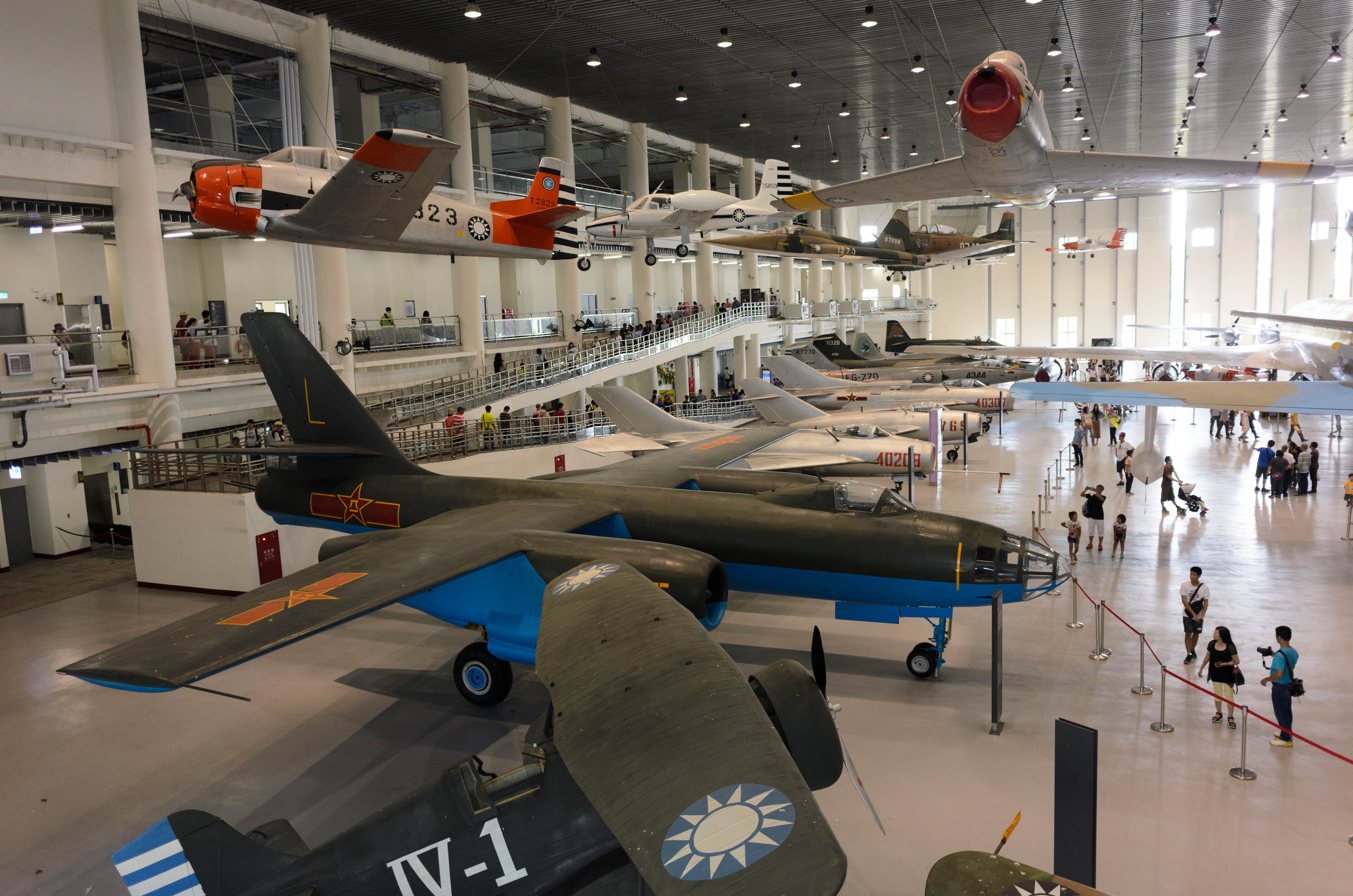
A PLAAF Harbin H-5 at ROCAF Aviation Education Exhibition Hall in Taiwan

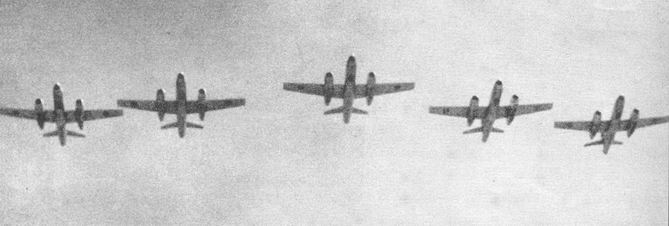
A formation of five brand-new EAF Il-28 bombers, seen at low level over Cairo during a parade in September 1956.

Il-28/H-5s at Uiju Airfield, North Korea, 2013. The Korean People's Army Air Force is the only remaining operator of the aircraft as of 2025.

The Il-28 was widely exported, serving in the air arms of some 20 nations ranging from the Warsaw Pact to various Middle-Eastern and African air forces. Egypt was an early customer, and targeting Egyptian Il-28s on the ground was a priority for the Royal Air Force during the Suez Crisis and later by the Israeli Air Force during the Six-Day War, and Yom Kippur War.

In 1958, following the 14 July Revolution, large orders were placed with the Soviet Union for the Iraqi Air Force, including for Il-28s. They were delivered from January 1959, equipping 8 Squadron, Iraqi Air Force. Iraq's Il-28s were heavily deployed during the First Iraqi–Kurdish War from 1961, bombing Kurdish insurgents and Kurdish-held villages. On 9 August 1962, two Iraqi Il-28s accidentally bombed a Turkish border post, killing a Turkish border guard, but when two more Il-28s crossed the Turkish border on 16 August 1962, they were intercepted by four Turkish Air Force F-84F Thunderstreak fighters, which shot down one Iraqi Il-28.

Egyptian Il-28s also took part in the North Yemen Civil War, starting in 1963. In addition to attacks on the royalist forces, they also bombed the Saudi cities of Jizan, Najran, and Khamis Mushait. Two Egyptian Il-28s may have been shot down near Sanaa by Royal Saudi Air Force Hawker Hunters flown by British pilots, in 1966.

The Soviet Union was in the process of providing the type for local assembly in Cuba when this was halted by the Cuban Missile Crisis, after which Nikita Khrushchev agreed to remove them. The type also saw limited use in Vietnam and with the Afghan forces in Afghanistan. Four ex-Egyptian and two ex-Soviet Il-28s (all with Egyptian crews) were operated by the Nigerian Air Force in the Biafra Wars. Finland also had four examples of this type delivered between 1961 and 1966 for target-towing duties. They remained in service until the 1980s.

The Soviet Union had relegated the Il-28 to second-line duties by the late-1950s. The supersonic Yak-28 was introduced in the early 1960s to take over the Beagle's low-level attack role; some Il-28 variants lingered in Soviet service into the 1980s The last Soviet-built examples were still flying in Egypt into the 1990s.

The People's Republic of China received over 250 Soviet-built Il-28s from 1952, and when the Sino-Soviet split occurred in the late 1950s, it decided to place the Il-28 into production, despite no manufacturing license being obtained. Chinese-built aircraft differed from the original Soviet aircraft in that they have a redesigned wing structure, abandoning the horizontal manufacturing break, saving 110 kilograms (240 lb) at the cost of a more difficult construction. Chinese aircraft also used a different tail turret based on that of the Tupolev Tu-16, and fitted with faster-firing AM-23 cannons. On 11 November 1965, a H-5 pilot defected to Taiwan with two crewmates, one committing suicide before landing. All were declared anti-communist heroes by Taiwan, and the two survivors served in the Republic of China Air Force, but were not allowed to fly. On 25 August 1985, a H-5 pilot defected, crash- landing in a rice field in South Korea, running out of fuel while being directed towards Gunsan airfield, killing its navigator and a farmer. The pilot was granted asylum in Taiwan while a radio operator and the aircraft were returned to China.

Chinese-built Il-28s designated H-5 and built by HAMC were still flying in the 1990s with several hundreds in China itself, and a smaller number in North Korea and Romania. The three main Chinese versions are the H-5 bomber, followed by the HJ-5 trainer, and the H-5R (HZ-5) long range (in comparison to the reconnaissance version of the Shenyang J-6) reconnaissance aircraft, and later, the HD-5 ECM/ESM version. The latter two types have been phased out.

The type is known to still be in active service with the Korean People's Army Air Force, although little is known as to whether they are a mix of survivors from the batch of 24 Soviet-manufactured aircraft delivered in the 1960s and some of the newer Chinese-built H-5 variant, or are solely H-5s. Some of these are probably used for spares to maintain a small group of around a dozen serviceable aircraft. They give North Korea a means of bombing targets in South Korea and Western Japan, although they would be vulnerable to modern anti air missiles and interceptors.

Several Ilyushin Il-28s are preserved in museums and as monuments in Russia, Germany, Hungary and in other countries.

== Variants ==
=== Soviet Union variants ===
Note: Order of variants determined chronologically by production/development dates.

Il-28
Basic three-seat bomber version, powered by two VK-1 engines.

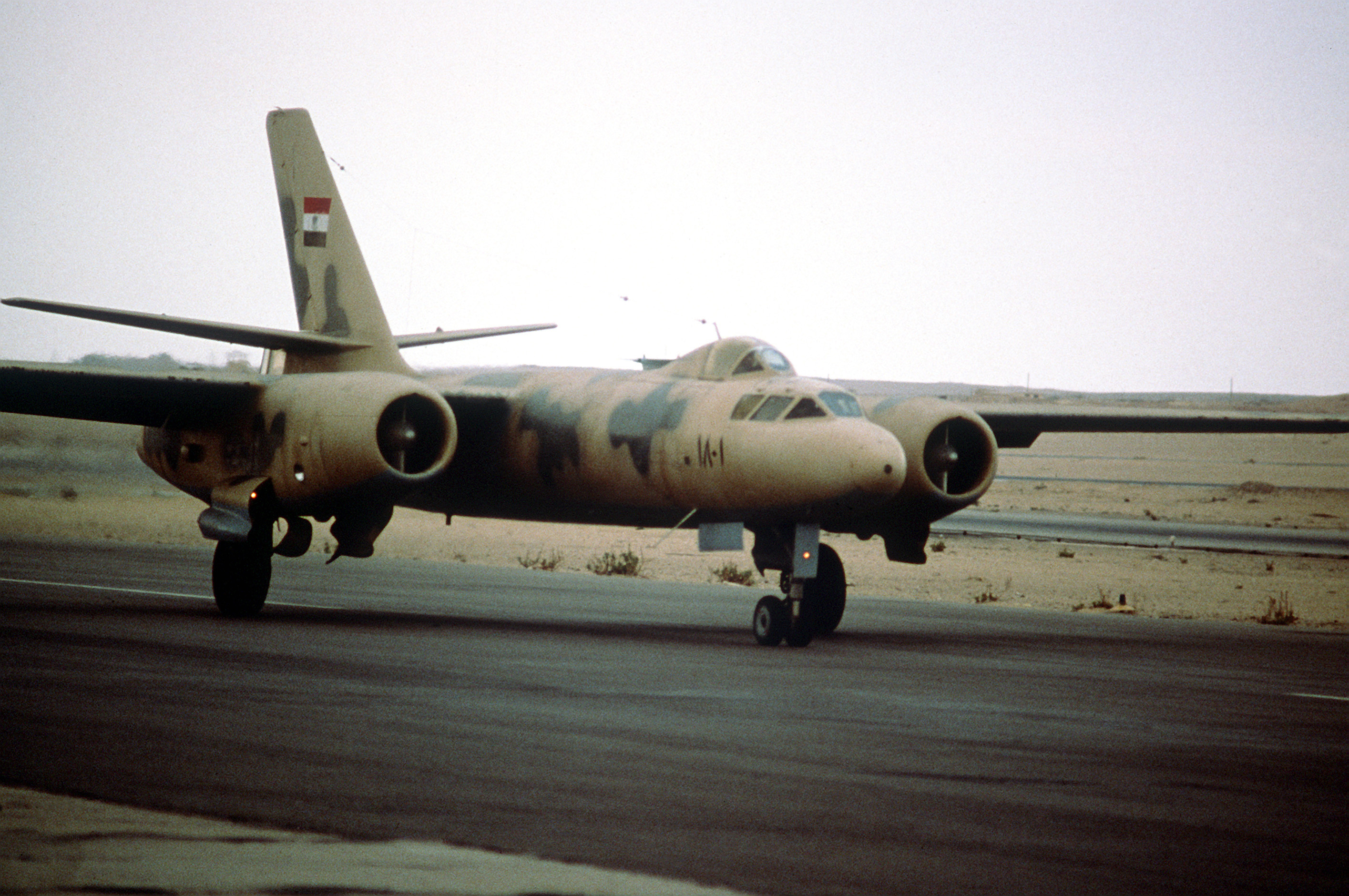
An Il-28U trainer of the Egyptian Air Force in 1981.

Il-28U
Unarmed training version fitted with new nose housing cockpit for instructor, while the trainee sat in the normal cockpit. First flown 18 March 1950.
Il-28R
Three-seat tactical photo reconnaissance version, with extra fuel in bomb bay and tip-tanks, and with one forward firing cannon removed. Fitted with revised undercarriage to deal with heavier weights. First flew 19 April 1950.
Il-28RTR
ELINT version of Il-28R.
Il-28REB
Electronic warfare, electronic jamming version, fitted with wingtip electronic pods housed in the former wing tanks.
Il-28T
Torpedo bomber version for the Soviet Naval Aviation able to accommodate two small or one large torpedo (including RAT-52 rocket propelled torpedoes) in a lengthened weapons bay.
Il-28N
Nuclear bomber for the Soviet Air Force with modified bomb-bay and revised avionics. (N - Nositel - carrier, also known as Il-28A - Atomnyy - atomic).
Il-28P
Unarmed civil conversion for Aeroflot, used as jet conversion trainer and to carry high priority cargo (i.e. newspaper matrices to allow simultaneous printing of Pravda and Izvestia in Moscow, Sverdlovsk and Novosibirsk). Also designated Ilyushin Il-20.
Il-28S
Proposed swept-wing version with more powerful Klimov VK-5 engines. Unbuilt.
Il-28RM
Modified Il-28R with VK-5 engine. One prototype built plus two similarly converted bombers (which carried no special designation) but no production.
Il-28TM
Il-28T with VK-5. One converted, no production.
Il-28PL
High-speed anti-submarine conversion of Il-28 bomber or Il-28T torpedo bomber. Capable of carrying dropping sonobuoys or acoustic homing torpedoes on direction of other anti-submarine assets.
Il-28Sh
Ground attack (Shturmovik) conversion of Il-28 with 12 underwing pylons for rocket pods. Small number converted which saw limited service.
Il-28ZA
Atmospheric sampling version.
Il-28M
Target drone conversion of Il-28. Also known as M-28.

=== Czechoslovak variants ===
B-228
Czechoslovak designation of Soviet built Il-28s.
CB-228
Czechoslovak designation of Soviet built Il-28Us.

=== Chinese variants ===
H-5
(Hongzhaji - bomber) - Standard three-seat tactical bomber. The structure of the two halves of the Soviet Union's Il-28 aircraft was changed to a common structure. The engine uses WP-5. The tail turret using H-6s caused some changes in the tail structure.
H-5A
Speculative designation of for nuclear capable H-5 variant (Il-28N).
HD-5
(Hongzhaji Dian - bomber/electronic reconnaissance) Chinese ECM jammer version.
HJ-5
(Hongzhaji Jiaolianji - bomber trainer) Chinese trainer version with similar layout to Il-28U.
HZ-5
(Hongzhaji Zhenchaji - bomber/reconnaissance) Tactical reconnaissance aircraft. Fitted with underwing drop tanks instead of tip tanks of Il-28R.
B-5
Export designation of the H-5.
B-56
Export designation of the 16 H-5 of the Pakistan Airforce which were used from 1966 to 1969.
B-5R
Export version of HZ-5.
BT-5
Export version of the HJ-5.
H-5 Ying
(Ying - eagle) Avionics testbed for Xian JH-7 programme.
H-5B
Speculative designation for unflown H-5 testbed for WS-5 turbofan engines.

== Operators ==
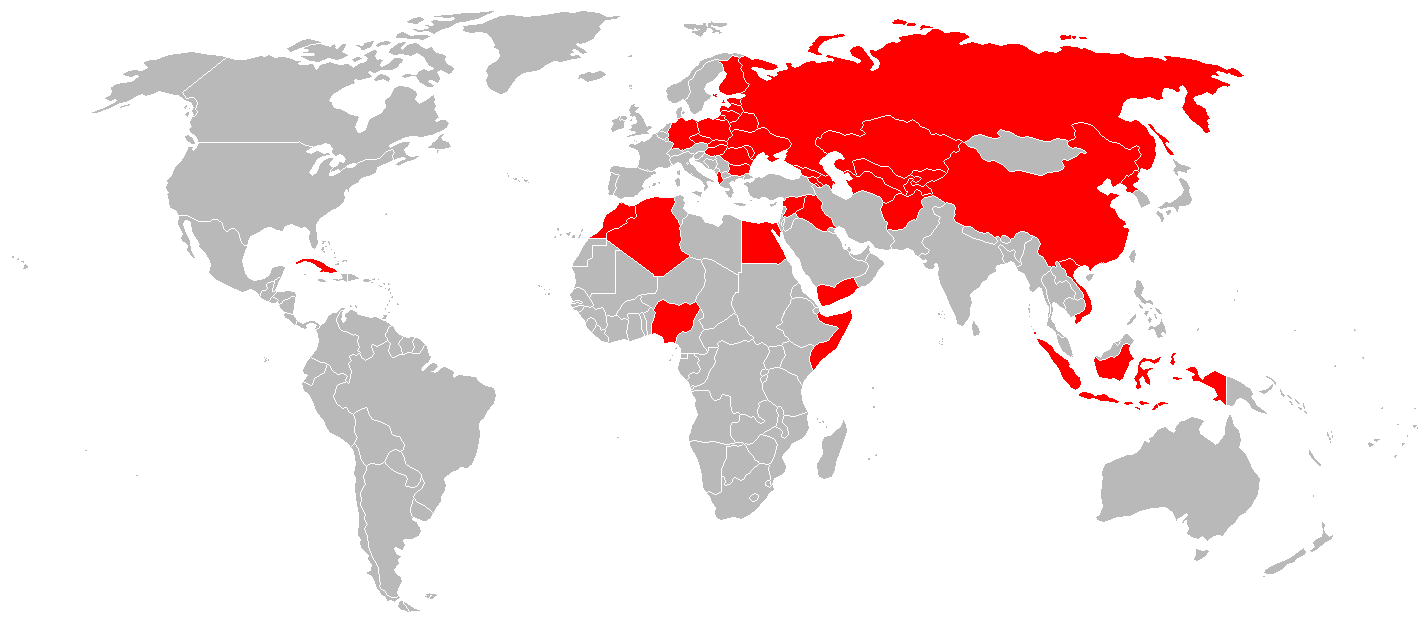
Il-28 operators

=== Current ===
North Korea

- North Korean Air Force - 80 Il-28 and H-5 as of 2023. But 36 aircraft are opertional.

=== Former ===
Afghanistan

- Afghan Air Force

54 aircraft acquired (including four Il-28U examples) from 1957. Only trainers were retained beyond 1994. All grounded during the civil war in the 1990s. Some were displayed during military parades such as the one in 1984.
Albania

- Albanian Air Force

Aviation Regiment 4020 operated one Il-28 acquired in 1957 attached to 2 Skuadrilja (2nd Squadron). This aircraft was traded for an Harbin H-5, the Chinese version of the Soviet Il-28, in 1971 and retired from service in 1992.
Algeria

- Algerian Air Force

Fourteen Il-28s were ordered from the USSR in 1965-1966. At least twelve of them were donated to Egypt following the Six-Day War.
Bulgaria

- Bulgarian Air Force

14 Il-28Rs and one Il-28U received in 1955 and retired in 1974.
China

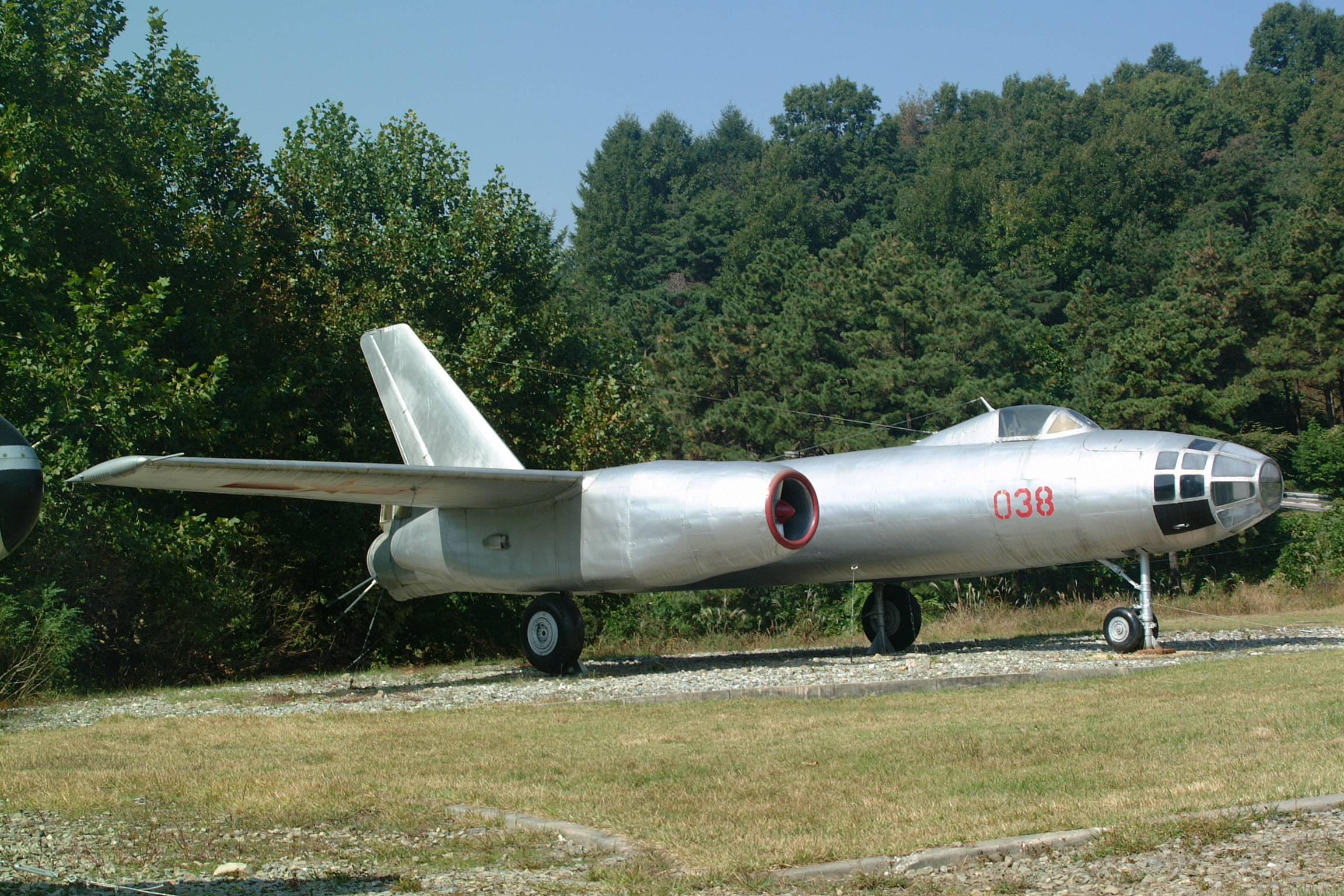
This is a Russian Ilyushin Il-28 'Beagle' bomber licence built in China as the Harbin (where the factory is) H-5.

- Hundreds of these aircraft were operated by the People's Liberation Army Air Force and People's Liberation Army Navy Air Force. Originally equipped with Soviet-built aircraft, the Chinese began full production of the H-5 by 1965. All Il-28s are retired as of 2000.
- Second Aviation School

Cuba

- Cuban Air Force

A total of 42 were received in 1962, but soon returned to the Soviet Union as a result of the Cuban Missile Crisis.
Czechoslovakia

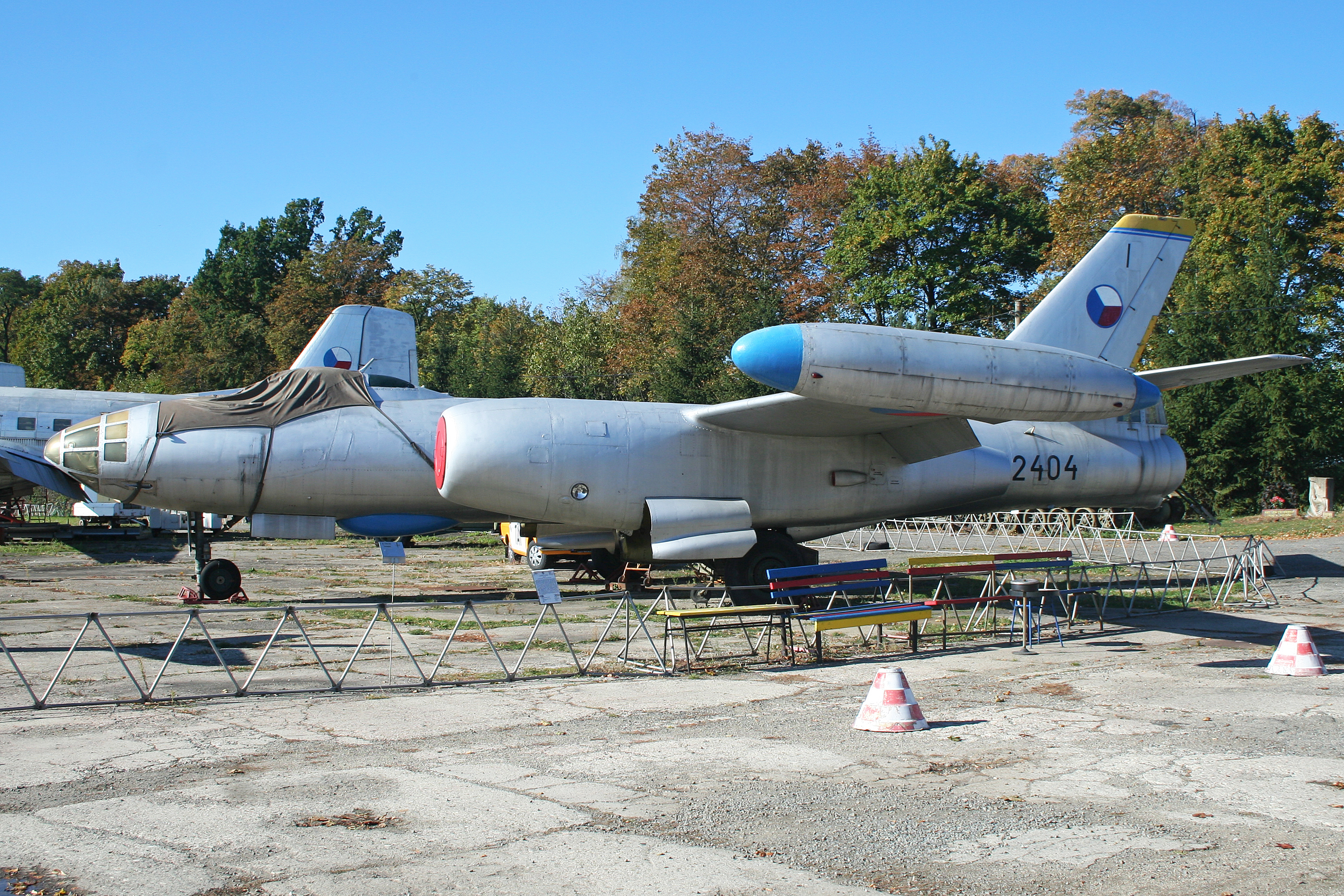
This is a recce variant, with tip tanks for extra fuel. msn 52404. Vyskov Museum, Czech Republic. 06-10-2012

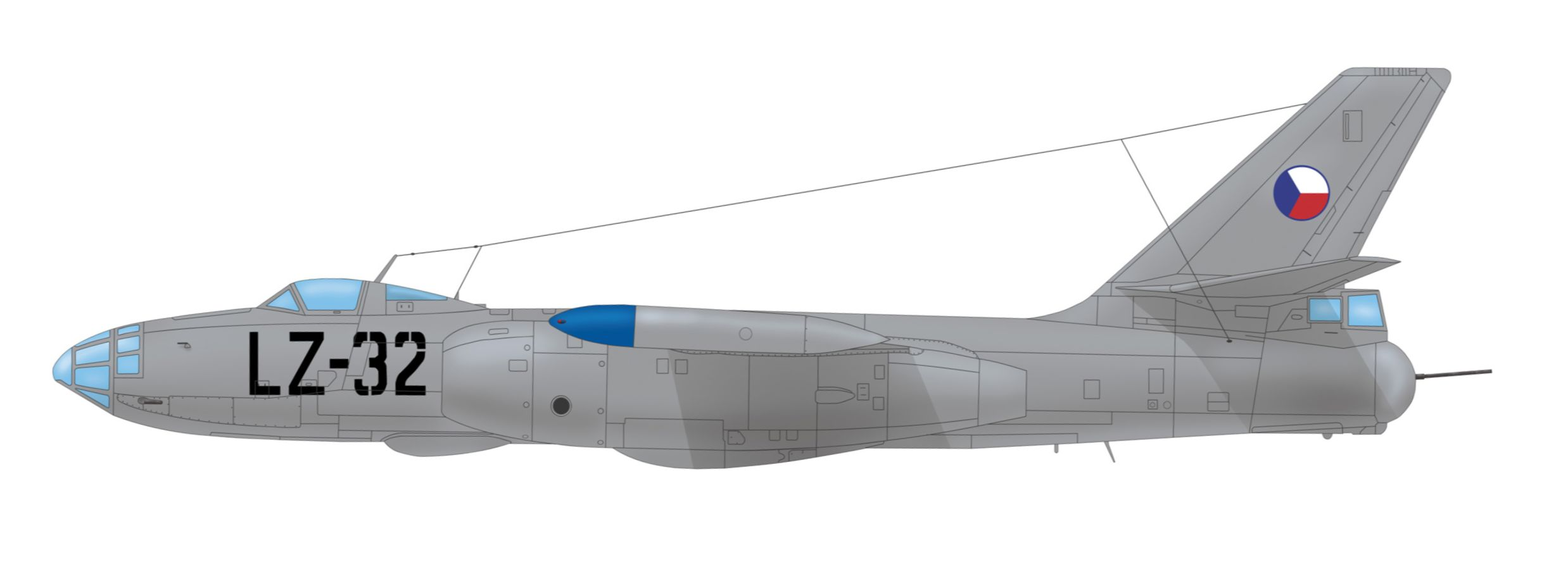
Ilyushin Il-28R, LZ-32, of the 47th Reconnaissance Air Regiment of the Czechoslovak Air Force, spring 1957

- Czechoslovak Air Force

Il-28 and Il-28Us locally designated B-228 and CB-228 which operated from 1954 until 1973. 90 Il-28s, 30 Il-28RTs and an unknown number of Il-28Us were delivered.
East Germany

- East German Air Force

Operated 12 Il-28s and one Il-28U aircraft, primarily on target tug and engine testing duties between 1954 and 1982.
Egypt

- Egyptian Air Force

Received 70 Czechoslovak-built Il-28s in 1956, shortly before the Suez Crisis. The IDF rated the Il-28 as a high priority target during the Six-Day War
Finland

- Finnish Air Force

Received four aircraft (one IL-28 and three Il-28Rs), coded NH-1..4, in the 1960s. The aircraft were used as target tugs and for maritime reconnaissance and patrolling as well as aerial mapping until 1981. The code letters of the type (NH) originated from Neuvostoliittolainen Hinauskone (Soviet towplane) but since they also matched initials of the Soviet leader Nikita Khrushchev (spelled Hruštšov in Finnish), their usual nickname was Nikita.
Hungarian People's Republic

- Hungarian People's Army Air Force

Indonesia

- Indonesian Air Force

21st Air Squadron based at Kemayoran Air Force Base, Jakarta received fourteen Il-28, two Il-28T, two Il-28R, and four Il-28U in 1959–1961. During Operation Trikora in 1962 (the conquest of Western New Guinea), two Il-28 were written off. Retired by Indonesian Air Force in 1964 and later transferred to the Indonesian Navy.

- Indonesian Navy

500th Squadron based at Juanda Naval Air Station, Surabaya received eleven Il-28T torpedo-bombers and two Il-28U trainers in 1965. Later also received ex-Air Force Il-28s. The last one was retired in 1972.

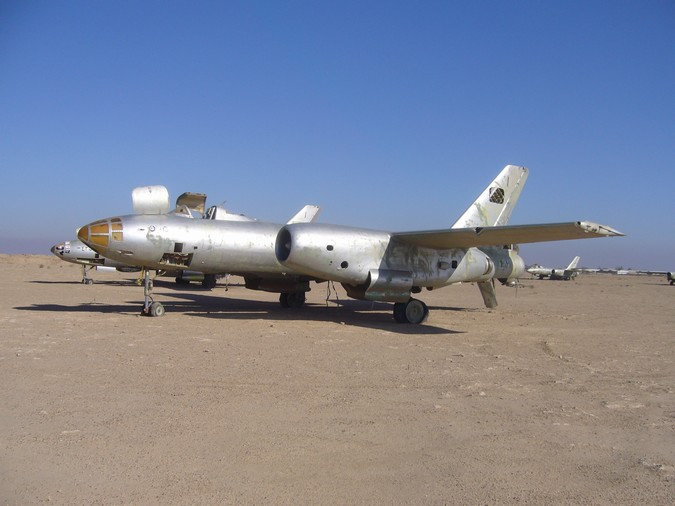
An Iraqi Il-28 bomber abandoned at Al Taqaddum, Iraq.

Iraq

- Iraqi Air Force

Received twelve Il-28s, two Il-28Us and two Il-28BM target tugs starting in January 1959. Some additional aircraft may have been acquired from Egypt in the 1960s. All destroyed or grounded after Desert Storm.
Morocco

- Royal Moroccan Air Force

Morocco operated two Il-28s.
Nigeria

- Nigerian Air Force

North Yemen

- Yemen Arab Republic Air Force

Four Il-28s donated by Libya in October 1972.
Pakistan

- Pakistani Air Force

Operated 16 Harbin H-5 between 1966 to 1969 under the designation B-56. These aircraft served alongside American-built Martin B-57B Canberra. The H-5s were not popular with Pakistani pilots, and they were eventually traded back to China in exchange for more Shenyang F-6C.
Poland

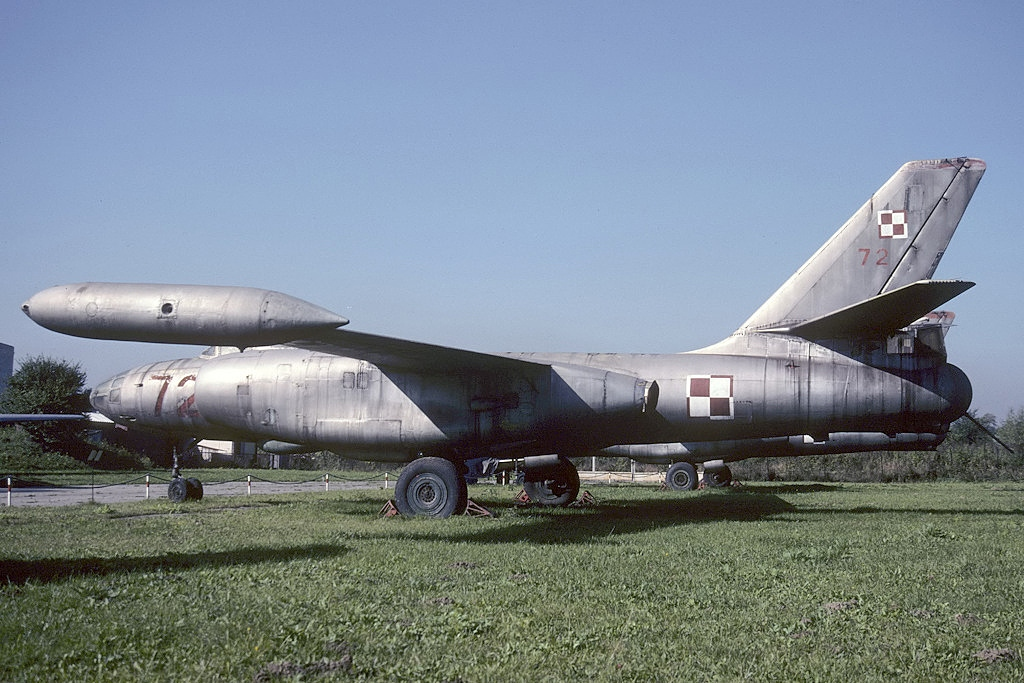
Ilyushin Il-28R

- Polish Air Force: Received 72 Il-28s, 15 Il-28Rs and 16 Il-28Us. The first aircraft arrived in 1952, last was retired in 1977.
  - 7 Pułk Lotnictwa Bombowo-Rozpoznawczego was based in Powidz.
  - 21 Pułk Rozpoznania Taktycznego operated Il-28R variant and was based in Sochaczew.
  - 33 Pułk Lotnictwa Bombowego was based in Modlin.
- Polish Navy

Romania

- Romanian Air Force

About 22 Il-28s, three Il-28Rs and eight Il-28Us, both Soviet- and Chinese-built, operated from 1955. All remaining Il-28s were retired from service by June 2001.
Somalia

- Somali Air Force, 4 units prior to 1977.

South Yemen

- People's Democratic Republic of Yemen Air Force

Received a single Il-28, one Il-28R and two Il-28Us from the USSR around 1972.

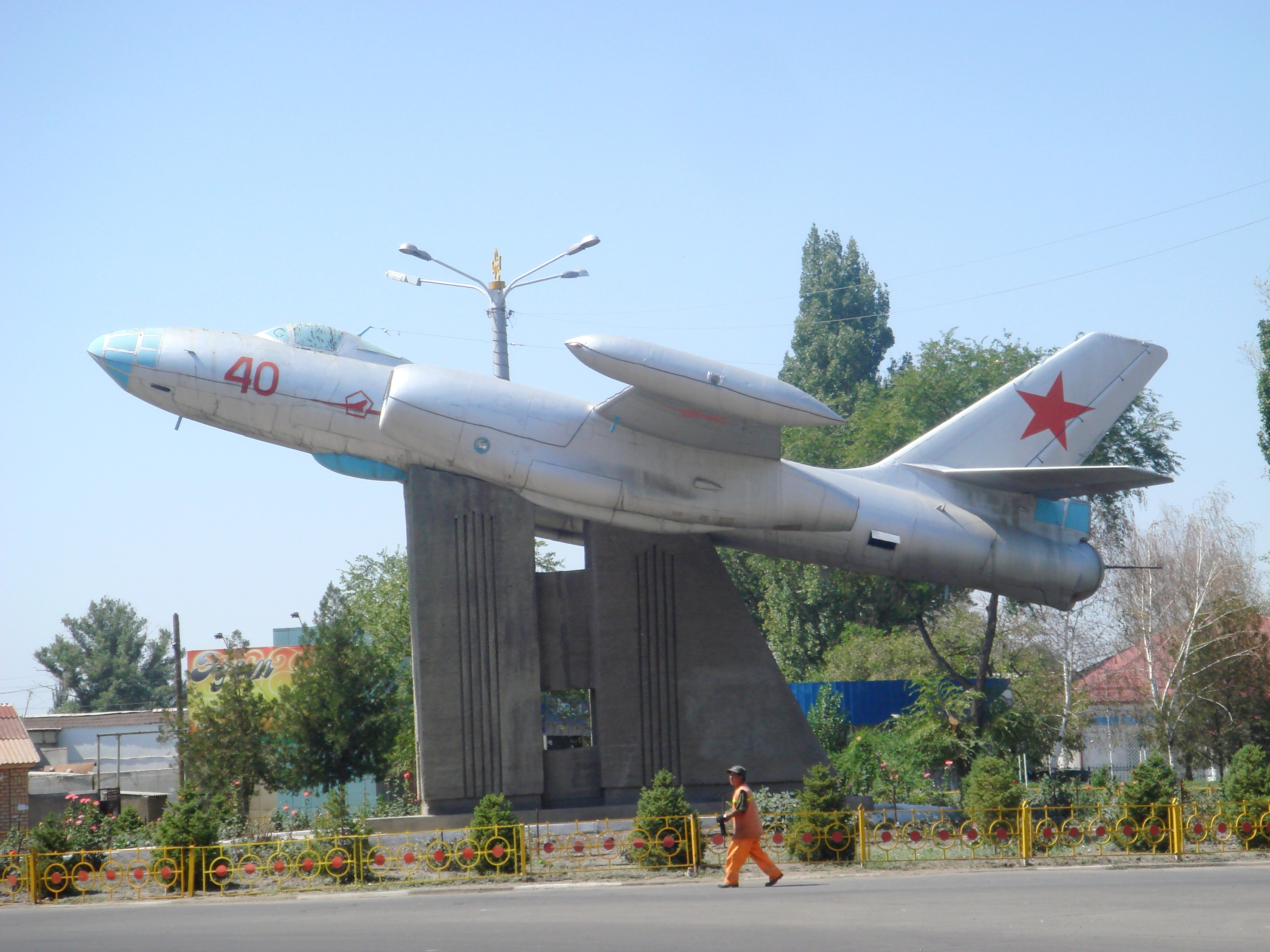
Soviet Il-28 bomber monument in Tokmok (Chüy Region, Kyrgyzstan)

Soviet Union
About 1,500 served with the Soviet Air Forces and the Soviet Navy (Soviet Naval Aviation), with operations beginning in 1950. Front line operations continued through the 1950s, with a few examples remaining into the 1980s. A small number of demilitarized aircraft were provided to Aeroflot.
Syria

- Syrian Air Force

Syria operated six Il-28s. Two were destroyed during the Six-Day War. The other four were dumped in airbases around Syria. Replaced in 1980s by Su-24.
Vietnam

- Vietnam Air Force Retired.

== Specifications (Il-28) ==
Ilyushin Il-28 3-view drawing

Data from Jane's All The World's Aircraft 1982–83

General characteristics

- Crew: 3
- Length: 17.65 m (57 ft 11 in)
- Wingspan: 21.45 m (70 ft 4 in)
- Height: 6.7 m (22 ft 0 in)
- Wing area: 60 m^{2} (650 sq ft)
- Airfoil: TsAGI SR-5S (12%)
- Empty weight: 12,890 kg (28,418 lb)
- Gross weight: 18,400 kg (40,565 lb)
- Max takeoff weight: 21,200 kg (46,738 lb)
- Powerplant: 2 × Klimov VK-1A centrifugal-flow turbojet engines, 26.5 kN (6,000 lbf) thrust each

Performance

- Maximum speed: 902 km/h (560 mph, 487 kn) at 4,500 m (14,800 ft)
- Cruise speed: 770 km/h (480 mph, 420 kn) at 10,000 m (33,000 ft)
- Range: 2,180 km (1,350 mi, 1,180 nmi)
- Service ceiling: 12,300 m (40,400 ft)
- Rate of climb: 15 m/s (3,000 ft/min)

Armament

- Guns: 4 × Nudelman-Rikhter NR-23 cannons (2 in nose and 2 in tail barbette)
- Bombs: 3,000 kg (6,600 lb) of bombs in internal bay (1,000 kg (2,200 lb) normal)

== See also ==
Related development

- Ilyushin Il-30
- Ilyushin Il-46

Aircraft of comparable role, configuration, and era

- English Electric Canberra/Martin B-57 Canberra
- North American B-45 Tornado
- Sud Aviation Vautour 2B
- Tupolev Tu-14

Related lists

- List of military aircraft of the Soviet Union and the CIS
- List of bomber aircraft
