= TR-1A =

TR-1A may refer to

- A "tactical recon" variant of the US Lockheed U-2 spy plane
- A variant of the Lyul'ka TR-1 1940's Soviet turbojet engine
