= Lyulka AL-5 =

AL-5
- Type: Turbojet
- National origin: Soviet Union
- Manufacturer: Lyulka
- First run: 1950?
- Developed from: Lyulka TR-3

The Lyulka AL-5 was a Soviet axial compressor turbojet developed from the Lyulka TR-3 turbojet around 1950. It was flight-tested in a number of prototype aircraft, but was not accepted for production.

== Design and development ==
The Lyulka TR-3A was redesignated as the AL-5 to honor Arkhip Mikhailovich Lyulka in 1950. It was a single-shaft turbojet with a seven-stage axial compressor. It had an annular combustion chamber with 24 nozzles and a single-stage turbine. It had a fixed exhaust nozzle and had a turbine starting unit.

It was used in the Mikoyan-Gurevich I-350, but flamed out when it was throttled back on that aircraft's first flight on 16 June 1951. It was also flown in the Lavochkin La-190 in 1951, but suffered similar problems. The AL-5 was modified as the AL-5G in an attempt to rectify the flame-out problem, which also increased its thrust by 2 kN (450 lbf), and was successfully flown in the prototype Ilyushin Il-46 bomber during 1952, but was not placed into production when the Tupolev Tu-16 was ordered into production instead of the Il-46.

== Applications ==
- Ilyushin Il-46
- Lavochkin La-190
- Mikoyan-Gurevich MiG I-350
- Yakovlev Yak-1000

== Specifications (AL-5G) ==
Data from Kay, Turbojet

==== General characteristics ====
- Type: turbojet
- Length:
- Diameter:
- Dry weight:

==== Components ====
- Compressor: seven-stage axial-flow
- Combustors: annular combustion chamber
- Turbine: single-stage

==== Performance ====
- Maximum thrust: 52 kN (12,000 lbf)

== See also ==
Related lists

- List of aircraft engines

== Bibliography ==
- Kay, Anthony L. Turbojet: History and Development 1930–1960: Volume 2: USSR, USA, Japan, France, Canada, Sweden, Switzerland, Italy, Czechoslovakia and Hungary. Marlborough, Wiltshire: Crowood Press, 2007 ISBN 978-1-86126-939-3
- Gunston, Bill. The Osprey Encyclopaedia of Russian Aircraft 1875–1995. London, Osprey, 1995 ISBN 1-85532-405-9
