= Ilyushin Il-30 =

1949 bomber aircraft prototype by Ilyushin

- Three-quarter view of the Il-30

General information
- Type: Bomber
- National origin: Soviet Union
- Manufacturer: Ilyushin
- Number built: 1

History
- First flight: Never flew
- Developed from: Ilyushin Il-28

The Ilyushin Il-30 was a Soviet turbojet-powered tactical bomber designed as a higher-performance, swept wing version of the Ilyushin Il-28, in the late 1940s. Its thin wing and engine nacelles necessitated the use of tandem landing gear, the first Soviet aircraft to do so. It was apparently canceled before the prototype made its first flight, although sources disagree with this.

== Development ==
The Il-30 was a follow-on to the Il-28, although design began on 21 June 1948, before the Il-28 had flown. It was designed to meet a requirement for a jet bomber that could carry 2,000 kg (4,400 lb) to a range of 3,500 km (2,200 mi) with a maximum speed no less than 1,000 km/h (620 mph). The design took that of the Il-28 as a starting point, but had thin, shoulder-mounted swept wings with a 35° sweep angle, chosen to allow the aircraft to reach its required speed. It was intended to be powered by two new Lyulka TR-3 axial-flow turbojet engines with 45.1 kN (10,140 lbf) thrust each in wing-mounted nacelles. Both the fuselage and the nacelles were area ruled.

Thin wings and the 2° anhedral necessary to cure the excessive lateral stability limited the amount of fuel that could be carried and tip tanks were required to meet the range requirement. The slim engine nacelles did not allow the main landing gear to be stowed there as was done in the Il-28. The solution was to house them within the fuselage — the first bicycle landing gear on a Soviet aircraft — with small, twin-wheeled, outriggers mounted underneath the nacelles to stabilize the aircraft on the ground.

The aircraft had a crew of four, the pilot, a bombardier, and two gunners. The pilot, bombardier and dorsal gunner shared one pressurized compartment that was subdivided into (firstly) a bombardier's position in the extensively glazed nose, and (secondly) a combined cockpit and dorsal turret (Il-V-12): the pilot and dorsal gunner were effectively placed back-to-back underneath the canopy. The tail gunner had a separate, pressurized turret (Il-K6) at the rear of the aircraft. Defensive armament was six 23 mm (0.91 in) Nudelman-Rikhter NR-23 cannon: two fixed firing forward and one pair in each turret. Maximum bomb load was 4,000 kg (8,800 lb)

The initial results were favorable, and a full-scale mockup was formally reviewed in March 1949. The prototype was completed by August 1949, but an incident involving the rival swept-wing Tupolev Tu-82 that broke an engine mount during a low-altitude flight led to delays as additional tests were demanded to determine the strength of the wings before the first flight was made. By the following year, the Il-30 program had lost momentum as the Ilyushin OKB was ordered to concentrate its resources on facilitating the service introduction of the Il-28. The Il-30 program was formally terminated by government order on 20 August 1950, and the prototype was eventually scrapped at the beginning of the 1960s. Aviation historian Bill Gunston quotes a maiden flight date of 9 September 1949, but Vaclav Nemecek says 1951.

Although the Il-30 never actually flew, it was the subject of much (misinformed) speculation in the West. Some of the common misconceptions were that it had a ventral gun mount and that it was the first Soviet bomber to attain the speed of 1,000 km/h (620 mph).

== Specifications (estimated) ==
Data from OKB Ilyushin: A History of the Design Bureau and its Aircraft

General characteristics

- Crew: four
- Length: 18 m (59 ft 1 in)
- Wingspan: 16.5 m (54 ft 2 in)
- Wing area: 100 m^{2} (1,100 sq ft)
- Empty weight: 22,967 kg (50,634 lb)
- Gross weight: 37,552 kg (82,788 lb)
- Powerplant: 2 × Lyulka TR-3 turbojet, 45.1 kN (10,100 lbf) thrust each

Performance

- Maximum speed: 1,000 km/h (620 mph, 540 kn)
- Cruise speed: 850 km/h (530 mph, 460 kn)
- Range: 3,500 km (2,200 mi, 1,900 nmi)
- Service ceiling: 13,000 m (43,000 ft)

Armament

- Guns: 6 × 23 mm (0.91 in) Nudelman-Rikhter NR-23 autocannon
- Bombs: 4,000 kilograms (8,800 lb)

== See also ==
Related development

- Ilyushin Il-46

Aircraft of comparable role, configuration, and era

- Sud-Ouest Vautour

Related lists

- List of military aircraft of the Soviet Union and the CIS
- List of bomber aircraft
