= Alekseyev I-212 =

1948 fighter prototype by Alekseyev

General information
- Type: Jet Interceptor Fighter
- National origin: USSR
- Manufacturer: Alekseyev
- Designer: Semyon Alekseyev

History
- Developed from: Alekseyev I-21

The Alekseyev I-212 was a twin-engine jet fighter designed in the USSR in 1947 at OKB-21 (OKB - experimental design bureau). It was a two-seat variant of the I-21 (Istrebitel' - Fighter) designed in response to a requirement for a very long-range fighter issued by the Voenno-Vozdushnye Sily (VVS), (Soviet Air Forces), in 1946. Intended as an escort fighter, it was also designed for use as a night fighter and reconnaissance aircraft. No prototype was built, although some parts may have begun building before the project was completed.

== Development ==
After working as Lavochkin's right-hand man during World War II, Semyon Alekseyev was appointed as Chief Designer of OKB-21 at Gor'kiy in 1946. The Council of the People's Commissars directed Alekseyev, among others, to develop jet fighters using more powerful engines than the captured German examples and Soviet-built copies. The OKB was tasked to design a single-seat jet fighter that could meet the very demanding specification of a maximum speed of 980 km/h (610 mph) and a range of 3,000 km (1,900 mi) with drop tanks. The OKB responded with the I-21, which was planned to be built in several variants.

Development of the I-212, one such variant, began in 1947 as a twin-engined, all-metal, two-seat jet fighter. The round, streamlined fuselage was optimized to reduce drag and house the considerable amount of equipment and fuel required by the VVS. It had mid-mounted straight laminar flow wings and the engine nacelles were mounted in the middle of the wing, with the wing spars continued by banjo rings around the engines. The cruciform tail unit was swept at 45°. To save weight, the main load-bearing structures of the airframe were constructed from V-95 aluminium alloy and high-strength steel. Elektron (a magnesium alloy) was used for many components and castings. The aircraft used a tricycle undercarriage with the main wheels retracting into the fuselage. Hydraulically actuated air brakes were fitted either side of the rear fuselage.

The pilot and gunner/radio operator sat in tandem, back to back in a single pressurized cockpit, protected by armour plates to their front and rear, as well as by a bulletproof windscreen, seated on ejection seats. The aircraft was intended to use Klimov VK-1 engines, a derivative of the Rolls-Royce Nene II, but the engine was still under development, so less powerful Kuznetsov RD-45s were substituted instead. The aircraft carried a Toryii-1 radar for use by the gunner/radio operator.

The primary armament was to have been four 23 mm (0.91 in) Nudel'man Suranov NS-23 autocannon mounted in the nose, each with 150 rounds per gun (rpg), and a remote controlled tail barbette, armed with a pair of 20 mm (0.79 in) Berezin B-20 autocannon also equipped with 150 rpg. The design team considered several variations, the first of which was two Nudel'man Suranov NS-23s with 150 rpg and a 45 mm (1.8 in) Nudel'man Suranov NS-45 autocannon with 45 rounds in the nose of the aircraft and a pair of NS-23 in the tail barbette. The second alternative consisted of two 37 mm (1.5 in) Nudel'man Suranov NS-37 and a 57 mm (2.2 in) Nudel'man Suranov NS-57 autocannon in the nose. A single hardpoint under each wing could carry a single 500 kg (1,100 lb) bomb or a drop tank carrying 550 kg (1,210 lb) of fuel.

Despite reports that a prototype began taxiing tests on 30 June 1948, it is now clear that no prototype was actually built and that only manufacturing of the tailplane may have begun.

== Variants ==
- I-212: Initial version, never built.
- I-213: Proposed heavier version with more fuel and only two forward-facing NS-23s and a single NS-23 in the tail barbette.
- I-214: Proposed version with the tail barbette replaced with a rearwards-facing radar and heavier forward-facing armament.
- UTI-212: Proposed training variant of the I-212 with both crewmen facing forward.

== Specifications (I-212 (estimated)) ==
Data from Early Soviet Jet Fighters

General characteristics

- Crew: 2
- Length: 13.08 m (42 ft 11 in)
- Wingspan: 16.2 m (53 ft 2 in)
- Wing area: 53 m^{2} (570 sq ft)
- Gross weight: 9,250 kg (20,393 lb)
- Max takeoff weight: 10,500 kg (23,149 lb)
- Powerplant: 2 × Kuznetsov RD-45 centrifugal compressor turbojet, 22 kN (5,000 lbf) thrust each

Performance

- Maximum speed: 1,000 km/h (620 mph, 540 kn)
- Range: 2,300 km (1,400 mi, 1,200 nmi)
- Ferry range: 3,100 km (1,900 mi, 1,700 nmi)
- Service ceiling: 14,000 m (46,000 ft)

Armament

- Guns: 4 × 23 mm (0.91 in) Nudel'man Suranov NS-23 cannon with 150 rpg.

2 × 20 mm (0.79 in) Berezin B-20 cannon in a remote-controlled tail barbette with 150 rpg.

- Hardpoints: 2 , with provisions to carry combinations of:
  - Bombs: 2 × 500 kg (1,100 lb) bombs.
  - Other: 2 × 550 kg (1,210 lb)-capacity drop tanks.

Avionics
Toryii-1 radar, navigation aids and radios.

== See also ==
Aircraft of comparable role, configuration, and era

- Gloster Meteor
- Sukhoi Su-9 (1946)

Related lists

- List of military aircraft of the Soviet Union and the CIS
