= Sukhoi Su-17 (1949) =

Military aircraft

Su-17

General information
- Type: Fighter
- Manufacturer: Sukhoi
- Status: Prototype only, never flew
- Number built: 1

The Sukhoi Su-17 (Aircraft R) was a prototype Soviet fighter. The name was later reused for an entirely different fighter-bomber, see Sukhoi Su-17.

== Development ==
The Su-17 was designed to closely match the theoretical TsAGI calculations for supersonic performance. The aircraft had a 50° swept wing fitted with air brakes and boosted controls. A unique feature was that in addition to an ejection seat, the entire nose section of the aircraft could separate from the rest of the airframe. The project was canceled with no flights due to problems with wing structure, ongoing difficulties with the development of the TR-3 engine, and the closure of the Sukhoi OKB. The only example was eventually used as a gunfire target.

== Specifications (Su-17 interceptor) ==
cutawayside view, showing equipment

Data from OKB Sukhoi

General characteristics

- Crew: 1
- Length: 15.253 m (50 ft 1 in)
- Wingspan: 9.6 m (31 ft 6 in)
- Height: 4.52 m (14 ft 10 in)
- Wing area: 27.5 m^{2} (296 sq ft)
- Airfoil: root:TsAGI 9030, tip:SR-3-12
- Empty weight: 5,932 kg (13,078 lb)
  Research variant: 6,240 kg (13,760 lb)
- Gross weight: 7,890 kg (17,394 lb)
  Research variant: 7,390 kg (16,290 lb)
- Fuel capacity: 1,219 L (322 US gal; 268 imp gal)
- Powerplant: 1 × Lyulka TR-3 turbojet, 45.11 kN (10,141 lbf) thrust

Performance

- Maximum speed: 1,209 km/h (751 mph, 653 kn) at sea level
  Research variant: 1,252 km/h (676 kn; 778 mph)
- Landing speed: 188 km/h (102 kn; 117 mph)
  Research variant: 194 km/h (105 kn; 121 mph)
- Maximum speed: Mach 0.985
- Range: 855 km (531 mi, 462 nmi) at 830 km/h (450 kn; 520 mph) at 10,000 m (33,000 ft)
- Endurance: 52 minutes
- Service ceiling: 14,500 m (47,600 ft)
  Research variant: 15,500 m (50,900 ft)
- Time to altitude: 4 minutes to 10,000 m (33,000 ft) (Research variant 3.5 minutes)
- Wing loading: 287 kg/m^{2} (59 lb/sq ft)

Armament
2 x 37 mm (1.457 in) Nudelman N-37 cannon with 40 rpg
