= Sukhoi Su-10 =

Soviet turbojet-powered bomber aircraft

Su-10

General information
- Type: Bomber aircraft
- National origin: Soviet Union
- Manufacturer: Sukhoi
- Status: Prototype
- Number built: 1

History
- First flight: Did not fly

The Sukhoi Su-10 or Izdeliye Ye (Russian: Product E) was a Soviet turbojet-powered bomber aircraft built shortly after World War II.

== Development ==
On 26 February 1946 OKB-134 was tasked with developing and building a bomber powered by four Lyul'ka TR-1A or six RD-10 turbojet engines. Work began on 24 April 1946, with many different configurations studied before the design was frozen. Alternative powerplant arrangements were constantly studied and included:-

- 4 x RD-10 (Jumo 004 copies)
- 6 x RD-10 (Jumo 004 copies)
- 4 x Lyul'ka TR-1
- 4 x Lyul'ka TR-1A
- 4 x Lyul'ka TR-2
- 4 x RD-500 (Rolls-Royce Derwent copies)

The Su-10 was a multi-engined jet bomber with a crew of four comprising Pilot, Navigator/Bomb Aimer (usually the Commander of the aircraft), Gunner/Radio Operator, Gunner/Observer. Ejection seats were provided for the Pilot, Navigator and Radio Operator, the tail-gunner escaped after jettisoning the tail barbette.

The airframe was of all-metal semi-monocoque construction with flush-riveted stressed duralumin skinning and highly stressed parts made from high-strength steel. The cantilever shoulder-mounted wings were trapezoidal in plan-form with rounded wing-tips. Built in one piece, each wing was a two-spar structure with ribs and stressed duralumin skinning, using TsAGI Sh-2-12 airfoils at the root and SR-3-12 section at the tip. The tail unit comprised a 45-degree swept fin and un-swept tailplane at approx 2/3 fin span using TsAGI 1V-00 aerofoil sections. Ailerons and elevators were hydraulically boosted.

Mounted at approx half span, the engine nacelles were designed for minimum interference with the wing aerodynamics. The engines were arranged in vertically staggered pairs, with the lower engine completely clear of the leading edge, exhausting under the wing, whilst the upper engine nacelle carried over the wing, exhausting at approx half chord.

Construction of test rigs and a static test fuselage was carried out throughout 1947, and the final propulsion arrangement was settled by a Council of Ministers directive on 11 March 1947, calling for the development and construction of a medium bomber powered by four Lyul'ka TR-1A turbojets. To assist take-off the Su-10 could also use four U-5 JATO boosters fitted on the lower rear fuselage sides.

The first prototype was completed and ready for flight tests when the OKB was among many shut down at that time and all work stopped. The Su-10 was sent to the Moscow Aviation Institute for use as an instructional airframe.

== Specifications (Su-10 / Izdeliye E) ==
Data from Early Soviet Jet Bombers, Istoriia konstruktskii samoletov v SSSR, 1938–1950, OKB Sukhoi, Osprey Encyclopaedia of Russian Aircraft 1875-1995

General characteristics

- Crew: 4 (pilot, navigator, gunner-observer, gunner-radioman)
- Length: 19.55 m (64 ft 2 in)
- Wingspan: 20.6 m (67 ft 7 in)
- Height: 6.55 m (21 ft 6 in)
- Wing area: 71.3 m^{2} (767 sq ft)
- Airfoil: root: TsAGI Sh-2-12; tip: TsAGI SR-3-12
- Empty weight: 11,500 kg (25,353 lb)
- Gross weight: 18,950 kg (41,778 lb)
- Max takeoff weight: 21,230 kg (46,804 lb)
- Powerplant: 4 × Lyulka TR-1A turbojet engines, 14.715 kN (3,308 lbf) thrust each
- Powerplant: 4 × U-5 JATO solid-fuel rockets with emergency and automatic jettison

Performance

- Maximum speed: 850 km/h (530 mph, 460 kn) / M0.75 at 6,000 m (20,000 ft)

810 km/h (500 mph; 440 kn) at sea level

- Range: 1,500 km (930 mi, 810 nmi) at 10,000 m (33,000 ft)
- Service ceiling: 12,000 m (39,000 ft)
- Rate of climb: 12.05 m/s (2,400 ft/min)
- Time to altitude: 10,000 m (33,000 ft) in 20 minutes
- Wing loading: 297 kg/m^{2} (61 lb/sq ft)
- Thrust/weight: 0.29
- Take-off run: 1,000 m (3,300 ft)

Armament

- Guns:

- 5 × 20 mm Berezin B-20E autocannon (1 fixed forward firing in lower forward fuselage, 2 in a remote controlled dorsal barbette and 2 in a KG-2 remote controlled jettison-able tail barbette)

- Bombs:

- Up to 3,000 kg (6,600 lb) of bombs in the internal bomb bay.

Avionics

- PBP-1 gun-sight
- RSB-3bis radio
- RSI-6 radio
- RV-2 radio altimeter
- ADF
- AFA-33 camera

== See also ==
Aircraft of comparable role, configuration, and era

- Convair XB-46
- Martin XB-48
- North American B-45 Tornado

Related lists

- List of aircraft
