= Lyulka TR-3 =

1940s Soviet turbojet aircraft engine

TR-3
- Type: turbojet
- National origin: Soviet Union
- Manufacturer: Lyulka
- First run: 9 September 1947
- Major applications: Ilyushin Il-30
- Developed into: Lyulka AL-5

The Lyulka TR-3 was a Soviet axial turbojet designed after World War II by Arkhip Mikhailovich Lyulka.

== Development ==
The Lyulka TR-3 was a single-shaft turbojet with a seven-stage axial compressor. It had an annular combustion chamber with 24 nozzles and a single-stage turbine. It had a fixed exhaust nozzle and had a pneumatic SV-3 starting unit, although this was later replaced by a turbine unit. It had a thrust of 46 kN (10,000 lbf). It was used in the Ilyushin Il-30 during 1949, but was superseded by later versions. The improved TR-3A version was redesignated as the AL-5 to honor Lyulka in 1950.

== Applications ==
- Ilyushin Il-30
- Sukhoi Su-17 (1949)

== Specifications (TR-3) ==
Data from Kay, Turbojet

==== General characteristics ====
- Type: turbojet
- Length:
- Diameter:
- Dry weight: 1,900 kg (4,200 lb)

==== Components ====
- Compressor: seven-stage axial-flow
- Combustors: annular combustion chamber
- Turbine: single-stage

==== Performance ====
- Maximum thrust: 46 kN (10,000 lbf)
- Specific fuel consumption: approximately 1.1
- Thrust-to-weight ratio: 2.38

== See also ==
Related development

- Lyulka AL-5

Related lists

- List of aircraft engines
