= Alekseyev I-21 =

Soviet prototype fighter aircraft family

I-21
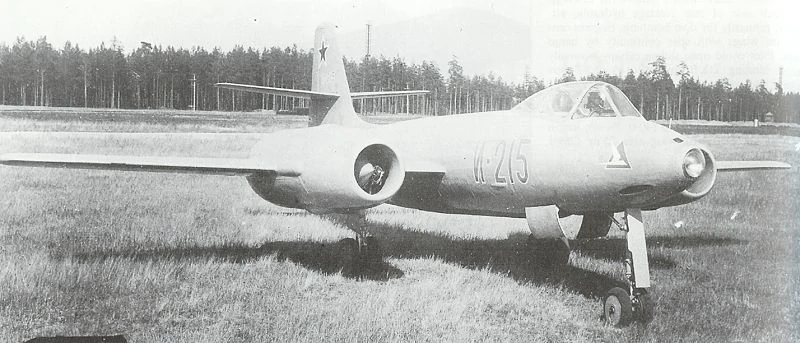

General information
- Type: Jet fighter
- National origin: Soviet Union
- Manufacturer: Alekseyev OKB-21
- Designer: Semyon Alekseyev
- Status: Prototype
- Number built: 3

History
- First flight: Late 1947
- Retired: 1947 after test flight.
- Variant: Alekseyev I-212

The Alekseyev I-21 was a Soviet twin-engined jet fighter, built in the late 1940s. Two prototypes were constructed with the designation of I-211, of which one was converted into the I-215 with more powerful engines. A third aircraft was built to evaluate the bicycle landing gear arrangement for use in other aircraft. The fighter was not accepted for production as it was inferior to swept-wing fighters like the Mikoyan-Gurevich MiG-15.

== Development ==
After working as Lavochkin's right-hand man during World War II, Semyon Alekseyev was appointed as Chief Designer of OKB-21 (design bureau) at Gor'kiy. The Council of the People's Commissars directed Alekseyev and other designers to develop jet fighters using more powerful engines than the captured German Jumo 004 and the BMW 003 and their Soviet-built copies. The result of Alekseyev's efforts was the I-21 (Russian: istrebitel (fighter)), which was planned to be produced in several variants.

The I-21 was a twin-engined, all-metal, single-seat jet fighter, with straight laminar flow wings, mid-set on a circular fuselage. The fighter's 1,500-kilogram-force (15 kN; 3,300 lbf) Lyul'ka TR-2 turbojet engines were mounted below the wings much like those on the German Messerschmitt Me 262 fighter. Underneath the engine nacelles were hardpoints that could carry 250-kilogram (550 lb) bombs or drop tanks. The slightly swept tail unit was cruciform in layout with the tailplane set at approximately half-fin span with slight dihedral. The aircraft's structure was generally constructed from high-strength B-95 duralumin, although high-strength steel and "Elektron" magnesium alloy were used for some components. A hydraulically retractable tricycle undercarriage was fitted, using twin wheels for the nose and main landing gear. Hydraulically actuated airbrakes were fitted either side of the rear fuselage. Alekseyev initially planned to arm the aircraft with three 37-millimeter (1.5 in) Nudelman N-37 autocannon, each with 30 rounds, but later decided upon a pair of 23 mm (0.91 in) Nudelman-Suranov NS-23 autocannon with 75 rounds per gun.

Design work on the I-210 (I-21 version 0) was concurrent with the I-21, probably as a fall back for any lack of availability of the latter's TR-2 engines. The only significant difference was the substitution of 800 kgf (7.8 kN; 1,800 lbf) BMW 003 engines (or the reverse-engineered RD-20), but the ex-German engine's significantly inferior thrust rating meant that it would never meet the I-21's speed requirement. Even replacing the BMW 003 with the slightly more powerful (900 kgf (8.8 kN; 2,000 lbf)) Jumo 004 would not allow the I-210 to meet the speed requirement and the project was cancelled before any metal was cut.

Construction of the first two airframes, designated as the I-211 (I-21 version 1), began at the end of 1946, under extreme pressure by the Ministry of Aircraft Production to complete initial flight testing by 1 August 1947, to enable the aircraft to take part in the Aviation Day Flypast at Tushino on 18 August. While one of the two airframes initially produced was used for static testing, the other was fitted with 1,300 kgf (13 kN; 2,900 lbf) Lyul'ka TR-1 turbojet engines because the intended TR-2 was not available. The engines were mounted in the middle of the wing, with the wing spars continued by banjo rings around the engines, much like those on the British Gloster Meteor fighter. Despite pressure from above, the I-211 was unable to participate in the Tushino display.

Flight testing started in late 1947, but only six test flights had been carried out before the I-211 struck a pothole on landing, which collapsed the undercarriage. Even the limited amount of flight testing showed it to be faster than the Sukhoi Su-11 which also used the TR-1 engine. Repairs were carried out and the opportunity taken to replace the troublesome engines with imported 1,590 kgf (15.6 kN; 3,500 lbf) Rolls-Royce Derwent V engines. Alekseyev took the opportunity to upgrade the aircraft to the I-215 configuration which had been in development since before the first flight of the I-211. The substitution of the centrifugal-flow Derwent for the axial-flow TR-1 forced the redesign and enlargement of the nacelles to accommodate the larger engine. Other modifications included increasing the fuel capacity from 2,000 kg (4,400 lb) to 2,300 kg (5,100 lb), provision for a ranging radar in the nose, and better protection for the pilot. The armament was revised to the originally specified N-37 guns, although the ammunition capacity was marginally increased to 35 rounds per gun. Despite good results from flight testing, the I-215 lost out in production orders to the newer generation of swept-winged fighters.

A second I-215 was built to an order from OKB-1 as the I-215D (dooblyor, second prototype), to evaluate the bicycle or tandem landing gear configuration. It used wider-diameter paired wheels in a tandem arrangement that retracted into the fuselage, along with small outrigger wheels under the engine nacelles which retracted into fairings. The main undercarriage of the I-215D also incorporated a kneeling feature which could increase the incidence of the aircraft by 3° to assist take-off. Trials with this undercarriage arrangement were successful and paved the way for its use in other Soviet aircraft, including Dr. Brunolf Baade's Aircraft 150, then under development.

== Variants ==
- I-210 - The initial version with BMW 003 or Tumanskii RD-20 engines, project only.
- I-211 - The first flyable example completed as the I-211 with Lyul'ka TR-1 engines, rebuilt as the I-215.
- I-211S - I-211 with swept wing and unswept tail, project only.
- I-215 - The re-built I-211 with Rolls-Royce Derwent V engines and other minor modifications.
- I-215D - Bicycle-undercarriage I-215 built to order of OKB-1.

== Specifications (I-211 as tested) ==
Data from Early Soviet Jet Fighters

General characteristics

- Crew: 1
- Length: 11.54 m (37 ft 10 in)
- Wingspan: 12.25 m (40 ft 2 in)
- Wing area: 25 m^{2} (270 sq ft)
- Airfoil: I-S10-11
- Empty weight: 6,890 kg (15,190 lb)
- Gross weight: 7,400 kg (16,314 lb)
- Fuel capacity: 2,000 kg (4,400 lb) (internal), 2,500 kg (5,500 lb) (with drop tanks)
- Powerplant: 2 × Lyul'ka TR-1 axial-flow turbojet, 12.8 kN (2,870 lbf) thrust each

Performance

- Maximum speed: 950 km/h (590 mph, 510 kn) at sea level
- Ferry range: 1,550 km (960 mi, 840 nmi)
- Service ceiling: 13,600 m (44,600 ft)
- Rate of climb: 27.78 m/s (5,469 ft/min)
- Time to altitude: 5,000 m (16,000 ft) in 3 minutes

Armament

- Guns: 2 × 23 mm (0.91 in) Nudelman-Suranov NS-23 autocannon with 75 rounds per gun

== See also ==
Aircraft of comparable role, configuration, and era

- Gloster Meteor – (United Kingdom)
- Sukhoi Su-9 (1946) – (Soviet Union)

Related lists

- List of military aircraft of the Soviet Union and the CIS

== Bibliography ==
- Gordon, Yefim & Kommissarov, Dmitry. Early Soviet Jet Fighters. Manchester, UK: Hikoki Publications, 2014. ISBN 978-1-902109-35-0.
- Gunston, Bill. The Osprey Encyclopedia of Russian Aircraft 1875–1995. London: Osprey, 1995. ISBN 1-85532-405-9.
