= Yakovlev Yak-1000 =

Soviet supersonic fighter aircraft demonstrator model

- An overhead view of the Yak-1000

General information
- Type: Experimental aircraft
- National origin: Soviet Union
- Manufacturer: Yakovlev
- Status: Unflown
- Number built: 1

History
- Developed into: P-15 Termit

The Yakovlev Yak-1000 was a Soviet supersonic technology demonstrator intended to evaluate the aerodynamic layout and field performance of the cropped delta wing discussed in captured German documents in combination with the new Lyulka AL-5 turbojet. The tandem undercarriage proved to be unsatisfactory and there were serious flight stability problems related to the delta wing, enough so that it never flew after an accident during taxiing tests.

== Background and description ==
A June 1950 Council of Ministers directive ordered Yakovlev to develop a supersonic fighter that used the 50 kN (11,000 lbf) Lyul'ka AL-5 axial compressor turbojet. Based on a recommendation from one of TsAGI aerodynamicists, Yakovlev was directed to use the rhomboid or cropped delta-shaped wing covered in captured German research. The directive was extremely ambitious as it required the maximum speed to be Mach 1.7 at a time when the world speed record was barely over the sound barrier. This requirement had to be revised when the AL-5 was delayed and a substitute engine had to be chosen. No other Soviet turbojet offered the same sort of power as the AL-5 so the project was recast as a technology demonstrator to evaluate the novel wing aerodynamics. The 15.9 kN (3,600 lbf) Klimov RD-500 was chosen and the maximum speed was expected to be 1,100 km/h (680 mph) at a takeoff weight of 2,407 kg (5,307 lb).

The Yak-1000 had a circular-section, semi-monocoque fuselage with the engine air intake in the nose. The engine was mounted behind the pressurized cockpit and exhausted through a long tailpipe in the rear fuselage. Two air brakes were fitted to the underside of the rear fuselage. Forward and rear fuel tanks held 430 litres (95 imp gal; 110 US gal) and 167 litres (37 imp gal; 44 US gal), respectively. The entire rear fuselage and tail could be removed to allow access to the engine.

The small, three-spar wings were the most significant new feature on the Yak-1000. They had an aspect ratio of only 1.46 with 60° leading-edge sweepback with 51°11' sweepback at quarter chord. The thickness/chord ratio was 3.4% at the root and 4.5% at the tip. The trailing edge was swept forward 11° and consisted of a full-span flap with an inset ailerons.

The delta-shaped horizontal stabilizer was set low on the tail and was shaped much like the wing, with 5% thickness. The rudder was tiny, as were the mass-balanced elevators. The tandem undercarriage legs, similar to those of the Yak-50, retracted aft, although the forward wheel remained exposed when retracted. Small outrigger struts retracted aft into underwing fairings set at mid-span. On the ground the Yak-1000 had a pronounced nose-high attitude, and the single nosewheel was steerable.

== Development ==
The prototype was completed on 27 February 1951 and it began taxiing trials on 2 March. On the following day it was taxiing at speed up to 250 km/h (160 mph), but was blown off the runway when a strong crosswind caused the aircraft to bank which compressed the strut on the opposite side. This forced the aircraft to veer off the runway when the ailerons proved ineffective at countering the bank and the consequent damage forced the testing to be suspended. Some development was done to try to remedy the problems with instability already revealed, but Yakovlev was unenthusiastic about the whole project and it was cancelled in October 1951.

The peculiar aerodynamics of delta wings would take the Soviets about another five years of experiments to validate in the Mikoyan-Gurevich Ye-4 prototype of the Mikoyan-Gurevich MiG-21 and the Sukhoi T-3 delta-winged aircraft which both first flew in 1955–1956.

=== P-15 Missile ===
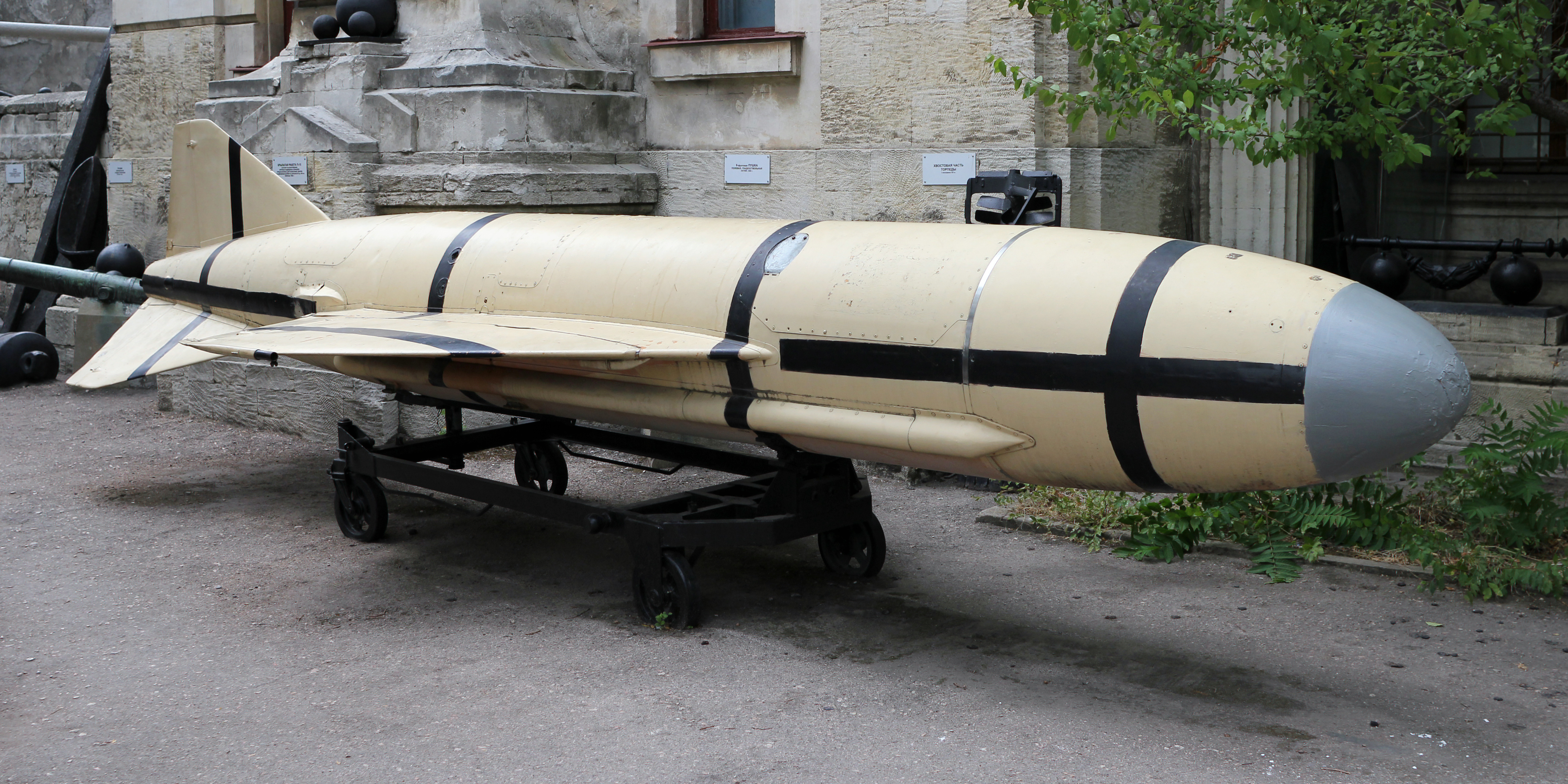
A P-15 on display at the Black Sea Fleet Museum in Sevastopol.

The Yak-1000's design and estimated performance ended up being recognized by Alexander Yakovlevich Bereznyak of MKB Raduga, who incorporated the smaller profile and small delta-wing layout into a ship-launched missile proposal that later became the P-15 Termit. The initial P-15 prototype featured a liquid-fuel rocket system and radar that replaced the air-breathing jet engine inlet and exhaust, but it carried over a very similar wing and fuselage configuration. The design would later transition into a folding wing design with a unique inverted Y-tail configuration, but the Yak-1000's features are still recognizable.

== Specifications (estimated) ==
Data from

General characteristics

- Crew: one
- Length: 11.69 m (38 ft 4 in) excluding nose probe
- Wingspan: 4.59 m (15 ft 1 in)
- Max takeoff weight: 2,407 kg (5,307 lb)
- Fuel capacity: 597 litres (131 imp gal; 158 US gal)
- Powerplant: 1 × Klimov RD-500 centrifugal-compressor turbojet, 15.9 kN (3,600 lbf) thrust

Performance

- Maximum speed: 1,100 km/h (680 mph, 590 kn)

== Bibliography ==
- Gordon, Yefim; Komissariov, Dmitry and Sergey (2005). OKB Yakovlev: A History of the Design Bureau and its Aircraft. Hinckley, England: Midland Publishing. ISBN 1-85780-203-9.
- Gunston, Bill (1995). The Osprey Encyclopedia of Russian Aircraft 1875-1995. London: Osprey. ISBN 1-85532-405-9.
- Gunston, Bill (1997). Yakovlev Aircraft since 1924. London: Putnam Aeronautical Books. ISBN 1-55750-978-6.
