= Lyulka TR-1 =

1940s Soviet turbojet aircraft engine

TR-1
- Type: Turbojet
- National origin: Soviet Union
- Manufacturer: Lyulka
- First run: 9 August 1946
- Major applications: Ilyushin Il-22; Sukhoi Su-10; Sukhoi Su-11; Alekseyev I-21

The Lyulka TR-1 was a turbojet designed by Arkhip Lyulka and produced by his Lyulka design bureau. It was the first indigenous Soviet jet engine.

== Development ==
In May 1944 Lyulka was ordered to begin development of a turbojet with a thrust of 12.3 kN (2,800 lbf). He demonstrated an eight-stage axial-flow engine in March 1945 called the S-18. In early 1946 the Council of Ministers ordered that the S-18 be developed into an operational engine with a thrust of 15.5 kN (3,500 lbf). The TR-1 was developed in early 1946 and had its first static run on 9 August. It was tested in the air on a pylon fitted to a Lend-Lease B-25 Mitchell piston-engined bomber.

The TR-1 was not a success, proving to have less thrust and a higher specific fuel consumption than designed. Its failure led directly to the cancellation of the first Soviet jet bomber, the Ilyushin Il-22. Lyulka further developed the engine into the TR-1A of 20.5 kN (4,600 lbf) of thrust, but its specific fuel consumption was very high and it too was cancelled.

== Applications ==
- Alekseyev I-21
- Ilyushin Il-22
- Mikoyan-Gurevich MiG-9 I-305 (izdeliye FT)
- Sukhoi Su-10
- Sukhoi Su-11

== Specifications (TR-1) ==
Data from Gordon, OKB Ilyushin: A History of the Design Bureau and its Aircraft.

==== General characteristics ====
- Type: Turbojet
- Length:
- Diameter:
- Dry weight: 885 kg (1,951 lb)

==== Components ====
- Compressor: eight-stage axial-flow
- Turbine: single stage

==== Performance ====
- Maximum thrust: 12.8 kN (2,900 lbf)
- Specific fuel consumption: 129 - 137 kg/kN·h (1.27-1.35 lb/lbf·h)
- Thrust-to-weight ratio: 1.47

== See also ==
Comparable engines

- BMW 003
- Heinkel HeS 011
- Heinkel HeS 30
- Junkers Jumo 004

Related lists

- List of aircraft engines

== Bibliography ==
- Gordon, Yefim; Komissarov, Dmitriy and Sergey (2004). OKB Ilyushin: A History of the Design Bureau and its Aircraft. London: Ian Allan. ISBN 1-85780-187-3.
- Gunston, Bill (1959). World Encyclopaedia of Aero Engines (2 ed.). Wellingborough: Patrick Stephens Ltd. ISBN 1-85260-163-9.
- Kay, Anthony L. (2007). Turbojet History and Development 1930-1960. Vol. 2: USSR, USA, Japan, France, Canada, Sweden, Switzerland, Italy and Hungary. Ramsbury: The Crowood Press. ISBN 978-1-86126-939-3.
