= Lavochkin La-190 =

La-190

General information
- Type: Interceptor
- National origin: U.S.S.R.
- Manufacturer: Lavochkin Design Bureau (OKB-301)
- Designer: Semyon Lavochkin
- Status: cancelled
- Number built: 1

History
- First flight: 21 February 1951

The Lavochkin La-190 (a.k.a. Aircraft 190), was a swept wing jet fighter designed and manufactured by the Lavochkin Design Bureau from 1950.

== Design and development ==
The La-190 was an all-metal aircraft with a bicycle undercarriage and mid set wings with 55° sweep at 1/4 chord. The afterburning, Lyul'ka AL-5 (TR-3A), axial flow turbo-jet engine was attached to the rear of the centre fuselage with the air intake at the extreme nose, and exhaust at the end of the rear fuselage. Access to the engine for maintenance and removal was gained by removing the rear fuselage aft of the wing.

The bicycle main and nose undercarriages were housed entirely within the fuselage with wing mounted outriggers in small pods at the wingtips. To increase the angle of incidence of the aircraft, to 20–22°, for take-off and landing, the twin wheeled levered suspension main undercarriage could be shortened or "knelt".

The swept wings were of medium taper with 2/3 span flaps / 1/3 span ailerons, and wing fences at approximately 1/2 span. The tail unit comprised a sharply swept fin with a delta tailplane at 2/3 fin length.

An early Soviet Airborne Interception radar was also fitted called Korshun – (Kite (the bird)), with a single aerial under a radome above the intake and a CRT for the pilot to manually track the target.

== History ==
The unusual layout of the La-190, combined with many innovations, including powered flying controls, and new manufacturing methods, challenged Lavochkin's design bureau. To assist with design, many test rigs were made to simulate parts of the aircraft and its systems. Aerodynamic models were also used in wind tunnels and as large-scale droppable gliding models.

Despite all the preparations, major problems with the Lyul'ka engine caused several flame-outs, one of which caused serious damage during the ensuing deadstick landing.

Although the La-190 displayed good performance during the limited flight testing carried out, the MAP – Ministerstvo Aviatsionnoy Promyshlennosti (Ministry of Aviation Industry) cancelled further work on Aircraft 190.

== Specifications (La-190) ==
Data from Gordon, Yefim. Lavochkin's Last Jets. Midland Publishing. Hinkley. 2007. ISBN 1-85780-253-5

General characteristics

- Crew: One
- Length: 16.35 m (53 ft 8 in)
- Wingspan: 9.9 m (32 ft 6 in)
- Height: 4.4 m (14 ft 5 in)
- Wing area: 38.93 m^{2} (418.6 sq ft)
- Empty weight: 7,315 kg (16,127 lb)
- Gross weight: 9,257 kg (20,407 lb)
- Powerplant: 1 × Lyul'ka AL-5 (TR-3A) , 8.83 kN (1,984 lbf) thrust dry, 49.05 kN (11,030 lbf) with afterburner

Performance

- Maximum speed: 1,190 km/h (739 mph, 642 kn)
- Maximum speed: Mach 1.03
- Range: 1,150 km (714 mi, 620 nmi)
- Service ceiling: 15,000 m (51,180 ft)
- Rate of climb: 55.6 m/s (10,936 ft/min)

Armament

- 2 x 37mm cannon

== See also ==
Aircraft of comparable role, configuration, and era

- Yakovlev
- Mikoyan-Gurevich

Related lists

- List of aircraft
- List of military aircraft of the Soviet Union and the CIS
