= Tupolev Tu-82 =

Experimental 1940s Soviet bomber aircraft

General information
- Type: Light bomber
- National origin: Soviet Union
- Manufacturer: Tupolev

History
- First flight: 1949
- Developed from: Tupolev Tu-14

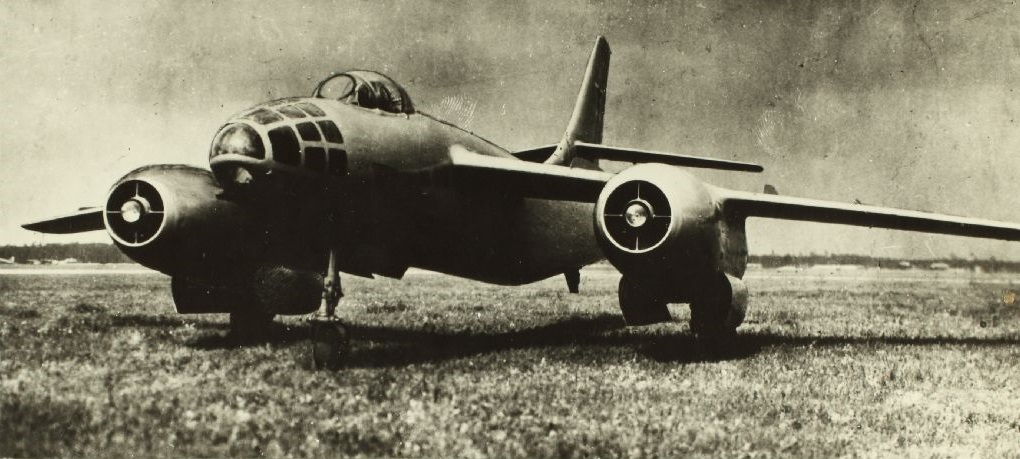
Tupolev Tu-82

The Tupolev Tu-82 was a 1940s Soviet experimental swept-wing bomber. It was the first Soviet jet bomber with swept wings.

== Design and development ==
Similar to the earlier Tupolev Tu-14, the Tu-82 was designed to investigate the use of swept wings. Powered by two Klimov VK-1 engines, the Tu-82 first flew in February 1949. It achieved a top speed of 934 km/h and a ceiling of 14,000 m. Tupolev planned a larger combat version as the Tu-86, but it was not built.

== Specifications (Tu-82) ==
Data from

General characteristics

- Crew: three
- Length: 17.57 m (57 ft 8 in)
- Wingspan: 17.81 m (58 ft 5 in)
- Wing area: 45 m^{2} (484 sq ft)
- Empty weight: 9,526 kg (21,000 lb)
- Gross weight: 18,340 kg (40,430 lb)
- Powerplant: 2 × Klimov VK-1 , 26.5 kN (5,955 lbf) thrust each

Performance

- Maximum speed: 934 km/h (579 mph, 503 kn)
- Range: 2,395 km (1,493 mi, 1,297 nmi)
- Service ceiling: 11,400 m (37,392 ft)

== See also ==
Related development

- Tupolev Tu-14
