= Ilyushin Il-54 =

Soviet transonic bomber

- Three-quarter view of the second Il-54 prototype

General information
- Type: Bomber
- National origin: Soviet Union
- Manufacturer: Ilyushin
- Number built: 2

History
- First flight: 3 April 1955

The Il-54 was a transonic bomber developed in the USSR in the 1950s. Only two examples were built before the project was abandoned.

== Design and development ==
The Council of Ministers issued a directive to OKB-115, for a transonic bomber prototype to be submitted for State Acceptance Trials in July 1954. The design of this bomber went through several stages before settling on the final configuration.

The Il-54, as built, had a very thin 45 degree swept wing with anhedral, which was shoulder-mounted on the fuselage. The Lyulka AL-7 engines were housed in slim, pylon mounted, pods at approximately 1/3 span. Because the wings and engine nacelles were too small to house a conventional undercarriage, the Il-54 used a bicycle undercarriage arrangement, with nose and main gear units on the centreline of the aircraft, at each end of the bomb bay. This arrangement meant a conventional rotating takeoff would be impossible. To enable the Il-54 to take off, in a reasonable runway length, the main gear knelt and the nose gear extended to give the ideal angle of incidence for takeoff (10 degrees).

Flight trials of the Il-54 commenced in April 1955 with test pilot Vladimir Kokkinaki at the controls. Difficult handling during the landing run was rectified by modifying the undercarriage.

Production of the Il-54 was not proceeded with, due to competition from Yak-25 derivatives, and the belief that crewed aircraft would soon be replaced by missiles.

Booked to fly in the flypast at Tushino Airfield in 1956, the Il-54 was dropped from the flying programme. The aircraft was then shown to a US military delegation at Kubinka. The delegation was told that the Il-54 was the Il-149, as part of a deception programme. As a result, the Il-54 was assigned far more importance than it actually warranted, and was assigned the NATO reporting name ("Blowlamp") after it had ceased flying.

== Variants ==
Datafrom:OKB Ilyushin

- Il-54T - Torpedo Bomber (project)
- Il-54U - Trainer (project)
- Il-54R - Photo-Reconnaissance (project)

== Specifications (Il-54) ==
Data from OKB Ilyushin

General characteristics

- Crew: 3
- Length: 28.963 m (95 ft 0 in)
- Wingspan: 17.65 m (57 ft 11 in)
- Wing area: 84.6 m^{2} (911 sq ft)
- Gross weight: 40,400 kg (89,067 lb) (1st prototype)

40,660 kg (89,640 lb) (2nd prototype)

- Max takeoff weight: 41,600 kg (91,712 lb)
- Powerplant: 2 × Lyulka AL-7 turbojet engines, 75.537 kN (16,981 lbf) thrust each with water injection (1st prototype)

2x Lyulka AL-7F 98.1 kN (22,100 lbf) with afterburning (2nd prototype)

Performance

- Maximum speed: 1,150 km/h (710 mph, 620 kn) at 5,000 m (16,000 ft) (1st prototype)

1,250 km/h (780 mph; 670 kn) at 5,000 m (16,000 ft) (2nd prototype)

- Landing speed: 243 km/h (151 mph; 131 kn)
- Take-off run: 1,150 m (3,770 ft)
- Landing run: 1,150 m (3,770 ft)
- Range: 2,057 km (1,278 mi, 1,111 nmi)
- Ferry range: 2,312 km (1,437 mi, 1,248 nmi) with drop tanks
- Service ceiling: 13,630 m (44,720 ft) (1st prototype)

14,000 m (46,000 ft) (2nd prototype)

- Rate of climb: 25.25 m/s (4,970 ft/min)
- Time to altitude: 5,000 m (16,000 ft) in 3.3 minutes

Armament

- Guns: * 1x 23 mm (0.906 in) Nudelman-Rikhter AM-23 cannon in the port forward fuselage.
- 2x 23 mm (0.906 in) Nudelman-Rikhter AM-23 cannon in the remotely controlled tail barbette
- Bombs: 3,000 kg (6,600 lb) of bombs (normal), 5,000 kg (11,000 lb) of bombs (overload)

== See also ==
Aircraft of comparable role, configuration, and era

- Sud Aviation Vautour
- Yakovlev Yak-26
- Yakovlev Yak-28
