= Ilyushin Il-46 =

1952 USSR bomber aircraft prototype

General information
- Type: Bomber
- National origin: USSR
- Manufacturer: Ilyushin Design Bureau
- Number built: 1

History
- First flight: 3 March 1952
- Developed from: Ilyushin Il-42

The Ilyushin Il-46 was a jet-engined bomber produced in the USSR during 1951-2, as the result of a directive to redesign the Il-42 project (half the drawings had already been completed). The revised specification was for an aircraft with twice the range and 1 1/2 times the bomb load, with a prototype ready to be submitted for state acceptance trials in July 1952. The Ilyushin design bureau set about designing two versions of the same aircraft, the straight-wing (Il-46) and the swept-wing (Il-46S), with as much as possible common to both aircraft. To meet the schedule for state acceptance trials Ilyushin built only the straight-wing version, fearing that the design, manufacture and flying characteristics of the swept-wing aircraft might cause delays.

== Design and development ==
The airframe, constructed of aluminium alloy with steel used in highly stressed parts, resembled a large Il-28, the long fuselage having swept tail surfaces, and a similar arrangement of cockpits for the crew of pilot, navigator and rear gunner. The wing, which had moderate taper but straight leading edges, copied the layout of the Il-28, being mounted in the shoulder position at the midpoint of the fuselage. The flying controls consisted of the usual ailerons, elevators and rudder, all fitted with trim tabs for reducing loads on the pilots controls during flight in steady states, as well as "reversible" hydraulically-powered actuators.

Two Lyul'ka AL-5 engines were fitted in long nacelles forward of the wings, exhausting through long jetpipes at the rear of the nacelles, aft of the wing trailing edge. The engines were mounted in this fashion to make room for the retracted main undercarriage legs, two on each side attached to the engine nacelles under the wings. The paired main undercarriage legs, side by side, retracted in opposite directions, inboard forwards and outboard rearwards, with the single mainwheels rotating 90 degrees to lie flat under the long jetpipes of the AL-5 engines. To boost takeoff performance, two JATO bottles could be attached to the rear fuselage. Performance was also improved when Lyulka AL-5F (forseerovannyy - afterburning) engines were fitted.

Flight tests and state acceptance trials were successful, with the Il-46 meeting all requirements. Production was not ordered because the Tupolev Tu-88 proved to have better performance, and was ordered into production as the Tu-16.

The Il-46S swept-wing version was designed concurrently, but construction was not started, to ensure that resources were not diverted from the Il-46.

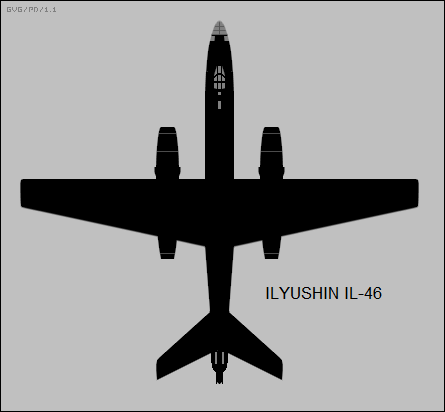
Ilyushin Il-46 plan view silhouette

== Variants ==
- Il-46
- Il-46S

== Specifications (Il-46) ==
Data from OKB Ilyushin

General characteristics

- Crew: three
- Length: 25.325 m (83 ft 1 in)
- Wingspan: 29 m (95 ft 1 in)
- Wing area: 105 m^{2} (1,130.3 sq ft)
- Empty weight: 26,300 kg (57,991 lb)
- Gross weight: 52,425 kg (115,597 lb)
- Powerplant: 2 × Lyul'ka AL-5 , 49.05 kN (11,025 lbf) thrust each

Performance

- Maximum speed: 928 km/h (527 mph, 458 kn)
- Range: 4,845 km (3,011 mi, 2,616 nmi)
- Service ceiling: 12,700 m (41,700 ft)
- Rate of climb: 12.25 m/s (2,412.4 ft/min)

Armament

- 3,000 kg of bombs (normal load)
- 6,000 kg of bombs (overload)
- 2 x 23 mm Nudelman-Rikhter NR-23 cannon fixed in the lower port fuselage
- 2 x 23 mm Nudelman-Rikhter NR-23 cannon in an Il-K6 turret at the rear of the fuselage.

== See also ==
Aircraft of comparable role, configuration, and era

- Convair XB-46
- Martin XB-48
- Short Sperrin
- Tupolev Tu-14
- Tupolev Tu-16
