= FETA =

Feta is a type of cheese.

Feta or FETA may also refer to:

- Federation of Environmental Trade Associations
- Fire Extinguishing Trades Association
- First European Transfer Agent
- Forth Estuary Transport Authority
- FETA, an identifier for alpha-fetoprotein a molecule produced in the developing embryo and fetus
- Feta (font), a font used for rendering musical notation, featured in the program LilyPond
- Feta Ahamada (born 1987), female sprinter from the Comoros

== See also ==
- FITA (disambiguation)
- Fitter (disambiguation)
- fetter
- PETA
