= Sukhoi T-49 =

Prototype Soviet fighter aircraft

T-49
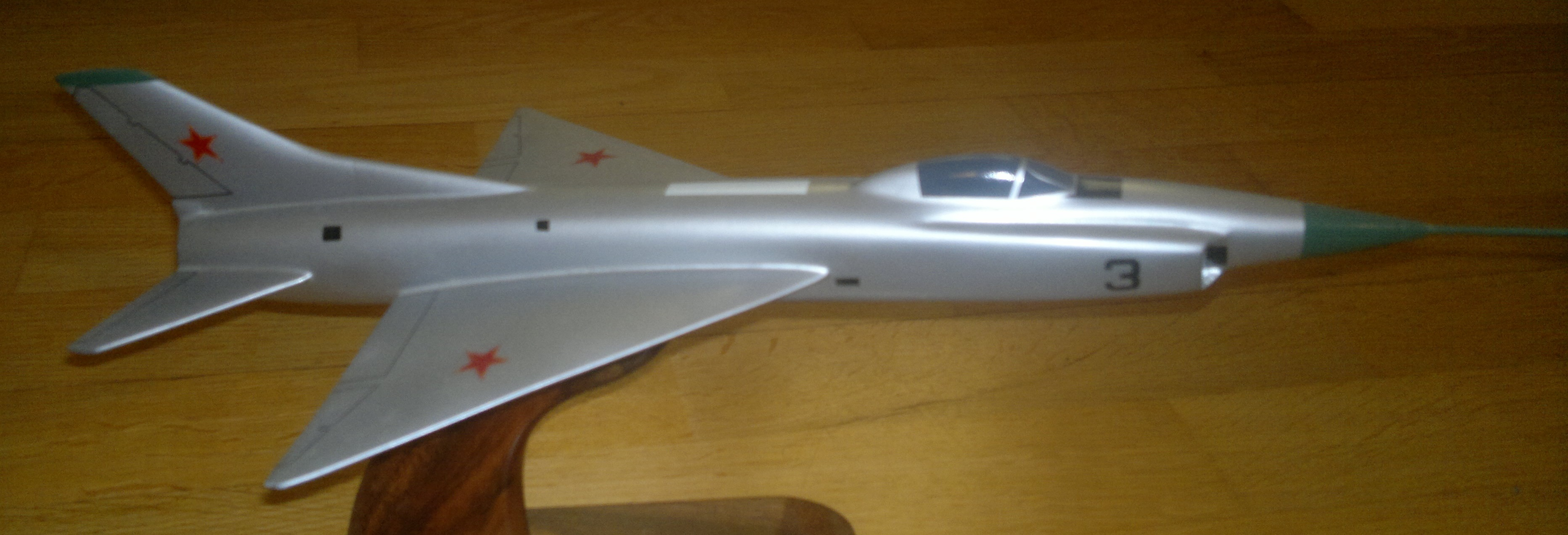
- Model Sukhoi T-49

General information
- Type: Interceptor aircraft
- Designer: Sukhoi
- Status: Prototype only
- Number built: 1

History
- First flight: January 1960
- Developed from: Sukhoi Su-11

The Sukhoi T-49 was a prototype Soviet fighter aircraft.

== Development ==
The Sukhoi T-49 was a modernized version of the Sukhoi Su-11 with new radar and modified armament. The project was officially launched on August 6, 1957. The maiden flight of the T-49 prototype took place in January 1960, after various rolling tests in October 1959.

In the development of the T-49, the delta wing, the tail and the cigar-shaped fuselage were taken from the Su-11. The entire fuselage in front of the cockpit has been redesigned to accommodate a more powerful radar. This extended the nose of the aircraft. Since this also gave the plane a larger diameter than the Su-11, it was no longer possible to accommodate the radar antenna in the shock cone of the air inlet. Therefore, lateral air inlets were constructed on both sides of the nose. This also simplified the operation of the radar, since its antenna was now firmly installed in the aircraft nose and the forward and backward movements of the engine shock cone no longer had to be compensated for.

The flight tests with the T-49 were promising but showed that the twin-engined project T-58 had a greater potential. Particularly in relation to the wishes of the PWO regarding the reliability of the engines, the single-engine T-49 did not meet these requirements as well as the T-58. However, the T-49 proved to be a valuable precursor to the T-58, especially in terms of radar and the development of the air intakes. In the air intakes, this helped the T-58 gain a development advantage over the competing design of the Yak-28-64. The T-58 finally developed into a production version under the designation Su-15.

The only prototype of the Sukhoi T-49 was damaged in April 1960. Although repairs were carried out, the aircraft was never flown again and was scrapped.

== Specifications ==
Data from The Osprey encyclopedia of Russian aircraft, 1875-1995

General characteristics

- Crew: 1
- Length: 19.8 m (65 ft 0 in)
- Wingspan: 8.6 m (28 ft 3 in)
- Powerplant: 1 × Lyulka AL-7F1-100 afterburning turbojet, 67.1 kN (15,100 lbf) thrust dry, 98.1 kN (22,100 lbf) with afterburner

Performance

== See also ==
- Sukhoi Su-7
- Sukhoi Su-9
- Sukhoi Su-15
- Mikoyan-Gurevich MiG-21
