= Sukhoi T-3 =

Type of aircraft

T-3
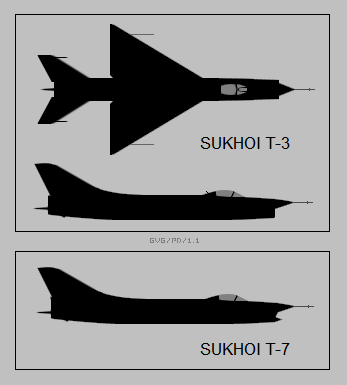

General information
- Type: Interceptor
- Manufacturer: Sukhoi OKB
- Status: Prototype only
- Number built: 3

History
- First flight: 26 May 1956
- Variants: Sukhoi Su-9

The Sukhoi T-3 was a prototype Soviet fighter aircraft.

== Development ==
Starting in the early 1950s, the development of the T-3 proceeded in parallel with the S-1 which would eventually become the Sukhoi Su-7. While the S-1 was a conventional swept wing aircraft (S stood for strelovidniy, стреловидный, swept wing), the T-3 had a delta wing with a leading edge sweep of 57° (T stood for treugolniy, треугольный, delta wing). Aside from the wings, the two aircraft shared the basic design as well as the Lyulka AL-7 turbojet engine. Since the T-3 was intended to be an interceptor, it was fitted with the Almaz (Алмаз, Diamond) radar housed in the air intake. The prototype first flew on 26 May 1956.

The T-3 was ordered into production at Factory No.153 but events overtook it when a revised specification was issued for the Interceptor fighter role. Three aircraft were completed and transported by rail to the OKB-51 factory near Moscow, where only one was to fly in as-built condition and all three prototypes were modified for various test programmes, becoming, for example, the T-39, T-49, PT-7, PT-8 and other experimental aircraft. To investigate different radar radome configurations as well as develop radar and missile sub-systems, two of the prototypes were converted to become the PT-7 and PT-8. The PT-7 had a variable intake ramp, while the PT-8 had an extended nose with a translating centerbody. Although not proceeded with, the T-3 served as the basis for what would eventually become the Sukhoi Su-9, forming the backbone of the PVO during the 1960s.

== Specifications (T-3) ==
Data from Green

General characteristics

- Crew: 1
- Length: 16.75 m (54 ft 11 in)
- Wingspan: 8.43 m (27 ft 8 in)
- Wing area: 24.2 m^{2} (260 sq ft)
- Powerplant: 1 × Lyulka AL-7F afterburning turbojet engine, 63.7 kN (14,300 lbf) thrust dry, 88.8 kN (20,000 lbf) with afterburner

Performance

- Maximum speed: 2,100 km/h (1,300 mph, 1,100 kn)
- Maximum speed: Mach 1.98
- Range: 1,840 km (1,140 mi, 990 nmi)
- Service ceiling: 18,000 m (59,000 ft)

Armament

- Missiles: 2 × Kaliningrad K-8 or Raduga K-9 air-to-air missiles

Avionics

- Almaz radar

== See also ==
Related development

- Sukhoi Su-7
- Sukhoi Su-9

Aircraft of comparable role, configuration, and era

- Douglas A-4 Skyhawk
- Mikoyan-Gurevich MiG-21
