= Fitting =

Fitting can refer to:

- Curve fitting, the process of constructing a curve, or mathematical function, that has the best fit to a series of data points
- A dress fitting
- Piping and plumbing fitting, used in pipe systems to connect straight sections of pipe or tube, adapt to different sizes or shapes, and for other purposes
  - Compression fitting, a fitting used to join two tubes or thin-walled pipes together
- Lightbulb socket or lamp fitting

== Persons with the surname Fitting ==
- Andrea Fitting, founder and CEO of Fitting Group
- Édouard Fitting (1898–1945), Swiss fencer
- Emma Fitting (1900–1986), Swiss fencer
- Frédéric Fitting (1902–1998), Swiss fencer
- Hans Fitting (1906–1938), German mathematician
- Willy Fitting (1925–2017), Swiss fencer

== See also ==
- Fit (disambiguation)
- Fitter (disambiguation)
- Fetting, a surname
- Fitling, a hamlet in the East Riding of Yorkshire, England
- Overfitting, production of an analysis that corresponds too closely or exactly to a data set
