= VKK flight suit =

Soviet high-altitude partial pressure suit

The VKK flight suit (Russian: высотный компенсирующий костюм), is a series of Soviet high-altitude partial pressure suit, which loosely translates 'altitude compensation suit'. It has been the standard issue for pilots of both the Soviet Air Forces and the Russian Aerospace Forces for jet aircraft since 1958.

== History ==
With the development of jet fighter aircraft after World War II, higher altitudes were much more achievable, presenting a risk of low air pressure exposure to pilots. To counter this, the Soviet Air Forces employed use of the VKK-1 partial pressure suit, which began to see use in 1958 as part of the 1958 KKO-1 oxygen equipment system.

=== VKK-1 ===
Pre 1955.

=== VKK-2 ===
Replaced the VKK-1 in 1955.

=== VKK-3 ===
In 1957, as Soviet fighter aircraft advanced, a new suit was developed to handle the demands of mach 2 flight, most notably Su-9 and MiG-21. Complex by the standards of 1957, it is a simple design that often required an assistant in order for the pilot to wear the suit. The pilot would open the large zip on the front before the pilot entered it, zipping it closed. It had a simple hose setup that was H-shaped, with hoses travelling up each leg, joining at the shoulders, and travelling down the arms. Unlike the following VKK suits, it had only a single air inlet on the abdomen.

It was worn with the Gsh-4 helmet, however depending on the altitude of each flight, a variety of helmets could be worn. The system was known as KKO-3 (Komplekt Kislorodnovo Oborudovaniya) assembly.

=== VKK-4 ===
By 1960, the VKK-3 was replaced by the vastly different VKK-4. Also used in high performance aircraft such as the Su-9 and MiG-21, it had several distinct differences to its predecessor. The front zipper was replaced by a zipper on each shoulder for entry of the suit, with more extensive lacing replacing the former suit's front zipper. While still incorporating the VKK-3's 'H' hose setup, the VKK-4 had two hose inlets instead of the single hose inlet.

While the suit could be worn also with the Gsh-4 helmet, it has also been noted that GSh-6 helmets were also worn with it. While it was quickly outdated by 1961, it saw extensive use well into the 1960s.

=== VKK-6 ===
The 1970s saw the replacement of VKK-4 with the VKK-6. Major differences were replacements of just one zipper on one shoulder, abdominal bladder system as opposed to a hose, and changes to the chest size for enhanced comfort and ease of entry. Additionally, more zips and lace were added for a better fit.

Being controlled from the aircraft itself, the suit automatically increases pressure when low pressure in the cockpit is sensed. It employs the GSh-6 helmet, and has heating to prevent visor fogging.

The VKK-6 is rated to 100,000 ft altitude and -50 to +50 degrees Celsius, and has been in long service with the Soviet Air Forces and has been used in the Russian Aerospace Force. In fact, it is only in recent times that it has been replaced by the VKK-15.
