= Fetting =

Fetting is a surname. Notable people with the surname include:

- Edmund Fetting (1927–2001), a Polish movie and theatrical actor
- Jeftha Fetting (born 1943)), South African cricketer
- Otto Fetting (1871–1933), an American realtor and editor
- Rainer Fetting (born 1949), a German painter and sculptor

== See also ==
- Fitting (disambiguation)
