= FITA =

FITA may refer to:

== Acronyms ==
- Friendly Islands Teachers' Association, a trade union in Tonga
- Fédération Internationale de Tir à l'Arc, known in English at the World Archery Federation
- Federazione Italiana Taekwondo, known in English at the Italian Taekwondo Federation
- Federation of International Trade Associations, for trade associations throughout the United States, Mexico and Canada that have an international mission
- Foundation for Information Technology Accessibility, an organisation advocating information communications technology (ICT) accessible to disabled people in the Maltese islands

== Other ==
- Fita, the old Cyrillic letter Ѳ, ѳ

== See also ==
- feta
- fitter
