= Kh-20 =

Kh-20 AS-3 Kangaroo
- Type: Nuclear cruise missile
- Place of origin: Soviet Union

Service history
- In service: 1960-1980s
- Used by: Soviet Air Forces

Production history
- Designer: Mikhail Gurevich

Specifications (Kh-20M)
- Mass: 12,000 kg (26,000 lb) at launch
- Length: 14.95 m (49.0 ft)
- Height: 3.02 m (9.9 ft)
- Diameter: 1.81 m (5 ft 11 in)
- Wingspan: 9.15 m (30.0 ft)
- Warhead: Thermonuclear warhead
- Blast yield: 0.3-3.0 megatons
- Engine: Lyulka AL-7FK turbojet 67.1 kN (15,100 lbf)
- Propellant: jet fuel
- Operational range: 380 to 600 kilometres (240 to 370 mi)
- Flight ceiling: 20,000 m (66,000 ft)
- Maximum speed: Mach 2.0
- Guidance system: Inertial guidance/radio command guidance
- Launch platform: Tu-95

The Raduga Kh-20 (NATO reporting name: AS-3 Kangaroo) was an air launched cruise missile armed with a thermonuclear warhead which was developed by the Soviet Union during the Cold War.

== Background ==
Kh-20 cruise missile was designed by M.I. Gurevich for the Tu-95 strategic bomber. Development began in 1954, drawing on experience with MiG-17 and MiG-19 fighters. Two Tu-95 were converted to Tu-95K missile carriers in 1955. Initial testing of the missile systems was performed using four specially modified MiG-19 fighters designated SM-20/I and SM-20/II for mothership-missile interface and airborne launch testing, and SM-K/I and SM-K/II for guidance system and ground launch testing. First SM-20/I launch from Tu-95K was made in the fall of 1956. One of the greatest challenges in the early development was starting the missile's Lyulka AL-7F turbojet engine after prolonged flight in the very cold upper atmosphere. Kh-20 began flight testing on March 17, 1958.

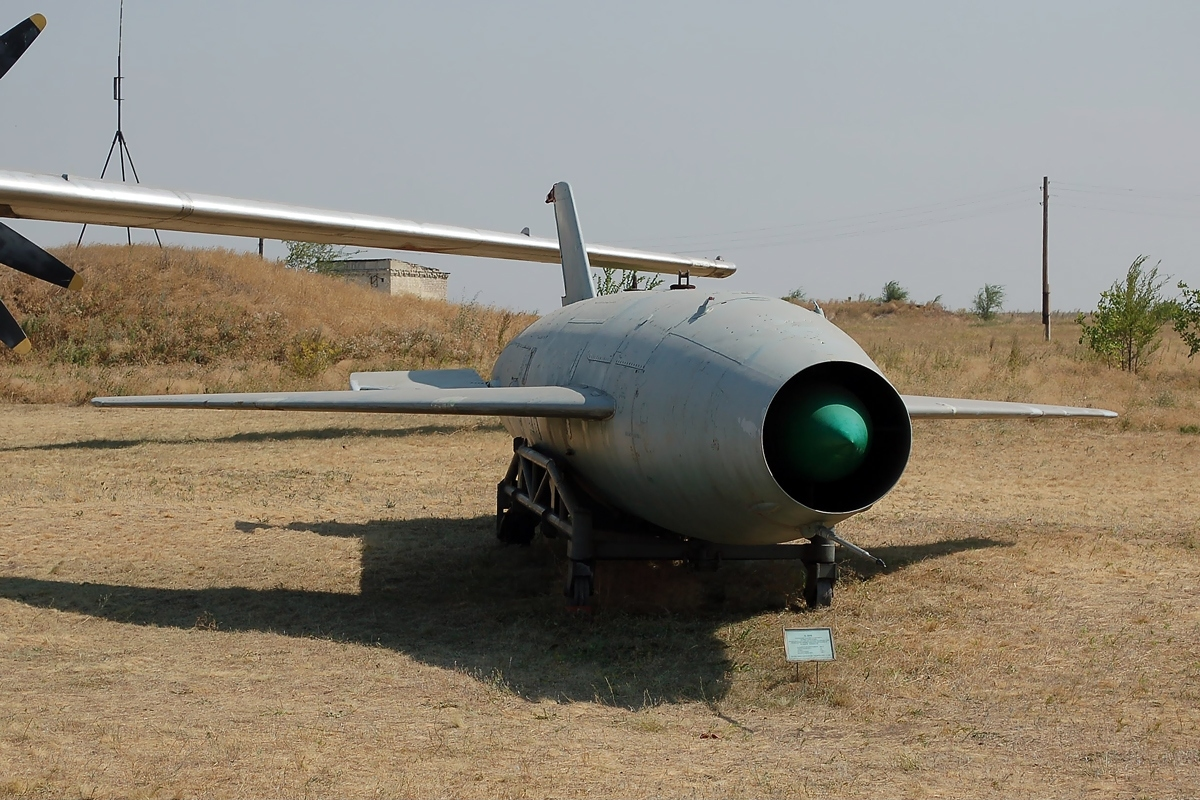
A Kh-20 missile on display.

The first launch was unsuccessful and range and accuracy did not meet expectations. This was in part because the warhead and the guidance system weight exceeded projected limits. Government trials took place between October 15, 1958, and November 1, 1959, and consisted of 16 launches of which 11 were considered successful although accuracy still left much to be desired. Kh-20 entered service in 1960. The production version, designated Kh-20M, featured an improved nuclear warhead. The arsenal initially consisted of two Kh-20 per Tu-95K, which amounted to 130 missiles for approximately 40 Tu-95K and 25 Tu-95KD. This number was later reduced to one missile per aircraft.

Kh-20 was initially intended for retaliation strikes against major targets in the United States. However, arming a Tu-95 with Kh-20 took 22 hours and the first-generation thermonuclear warheads were difficult to store which made them unsuitable for first-response weapons. Therefore, Kh-20 was relegated to secondary strikes against targets surviving the initial attack and against aircraft carrier groups. Arming time was eventually reduced to 4 hours and reliability was improved. The weakest link of the Kh-20 remained its guidance system and good accuracy required manual guidance which was vulnerable to jamming.

An attempt to adapt Myasishchev M-4 for Kh-20 was unsuccessful because of the missile's large size. High-altitude supersonic target M-20 was also abandoned due to high cost. By the late 1970s, Kh-20 no longer had the performance required to penetrate enemy air defenses and it was replaced by Kh-22 (NATO designation AS-4 Kitchen) by mid-1980s.

== Operators ==
Soviet Union
The Soviet Air Forces were the only operator of the Kh-20.

== Specifications ==
- Wingspan: 9.15 m
- Length: 14.95 m
- Diameter: 1.81 m
- Height: 3.02 m
- Empty weight: 5,878 kg
- Launch weight: 12,000 kg
- Engine: 1x Lyulka AL-7FK turbojet
- Cruise speed: Mach 2.0
- Cruise ceiling: Target-dependent, up to 20,000 m
- Range: 380–600 km
- Guidance: Inertial with remote correction over radio
- Warhead: 2,300 kg thermonuclear, 0.8-3.0 Mt

== Bibliography ==
- Gordon, Yefim (2004). Soviet/Russian Aircraft Weapons Since World War Two. Hinckley, England: Midland Publishing. ISBN 1-85780-188-1.
- Healey, John K. (January–February 2004). "Retired Warriors: 'Cold War' Bomber Legacy". Air Enthusiast. No. 109. pp. 75–79. ISSN 0143-5450.
