= Andrea Fitting =

American businesswoman

Andrea Fitting is the first female director of Parkvale Bank, the sixth-largest bank headquartered in the Pittsburgh region and the 26th-largest public company in Pennsylvania. She is serving her fourth term in this capacity. Fitting is founder and CEO of Fitting Group, a branding agency headquartered in Pittsburgh.

== Career ==
Fitting holds B.A. and Ph.D. degrees in Anthropology/Archaeology from the University of Pittsburgh and is a former Fulbright Scholar. She has taught courses at California University of Pennsylvania, Carnegie Museum of Natural History, Carlow University and the University of Pittsburgh.

In 1986, Fitting launched Fitting Group with only $800 and with no experience. She received international media coverage when Fitting Group launched a controversial marketing campaign to promote their Brand Spanking process that featured a whip-bearing dominatrix.

As a result of her company's attention-grabbing marketing campaign, Fitting's expert branding opinions have been frequently published. She has been quoted on the marketing tactics of companies such as Nike and Abercrombie and Fitch, as well as Martha Stewart's brand.

In 2013, Fitting Group was acquired by C-leveled.

Within the Pittsburgh region, Fitting has held several prominent positions. From 1995 to 1998, she served on the Consumer Advisory Council of the Pennsylvania Public Utility Commission, and from 1998 to 2003, she was former Pennsylvania Governor Tom Ridge's appointee to the Pennsylvania Historical and Museum Commission. Fitting also currently serves on the board of Pittsburgh Social Venture Partners.

== Awards ==
Extensive recognition has been awarded to Fitting for her work and involvement in the entrepreneurial community.

Some of her awards are:

- YWCA/NAWBO Woman Entrepreneur of the Year (1994)
- Pennsylvania Honor Roll of Women (1996)
- Best 50 Women in Business in Pennsylvania (1998)
- Susan B. Anthony award for Leadership (1999)
- Ernst & Young Entrepreneur of the Year finalist (2002)
- SBN Magazine Pacesetters (2003)
- Girl Scouts Trillium Council Woman of Distinction Award (2008)
