= K-5 (missile) =

Soviet short-range air-to-air missile

K-5 AA-1 Alkali
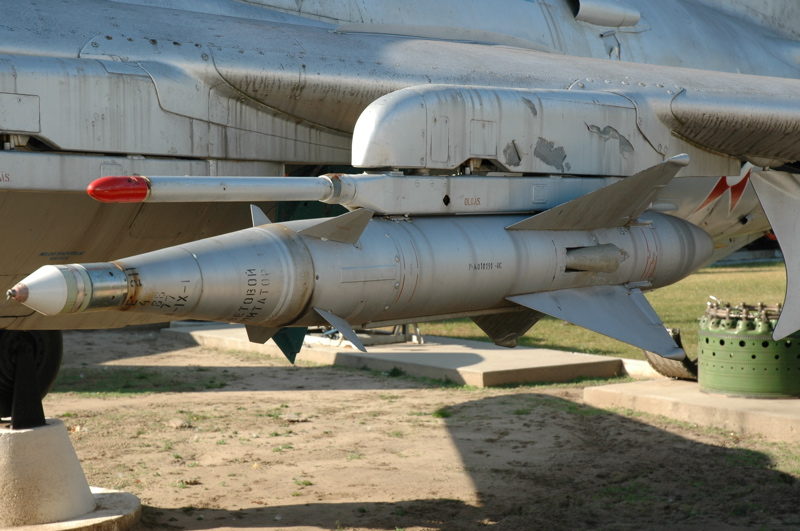
- K-5M
- Type: Short-range air-to-air missile
- Place of origin: Soviet Union

Service history
- In service: 1957-1977; 1964-1968 (PLAAF for non-combat)
- Used by: Soviet Air Force, People's Liberation Army Air Force

Production history
- Manufacturer: Kaliningrad Series Production Plant
- Variants: K-55

Specifications
- Mass: 82.7 kg (182 lb)
- Length: 2.49 m (8 ft 2 in)
- Diameter: 200 mm (7.9 in)
- Warhead: High explosive
- Warhead weight: 13 kg (29 lb)
- Engine: Rocket
- Operational range: 2 to 6 kilometres (1.2 to 3.7 mi)
- Maximum speed: 2,880 km/h (1,790 mph) (Mach 2.33)
- Guidance system: beam riding
- Launch platform: MiG-17, MiG-19, MiG-21, Su-9

The Kaliningrad K-5 (NATO reporting name AA-1 Alkali), also known as RS-1U or product ShM, was an early Soviet air-to-air missile.

== History ==
The development of the K-5 began in 1951. The first test firings were in 1953. It was tested (but not operationally carried) by the Yakovlev Yak-25. The weapon entered service as the Grushin/Tomashevich (Russian: Грушин/Томашевич) RS-2U (also known as the R-5MS or K-5MS) in 1957. The initial version was matched to the RP-2U (Izumrud-2) radar used on the MiG-17PFU, MiG-19PM. An improved variant, K-5M or RS-2US in PVO service, entered production in 1959, matched to the RP-9/RP-9U (TsD-30) radar of the Sukhoi Su-9. The People's Republic of China developed a copy under the designation PL-1, for use by their J-6A fighters.

The difficulties associated with beam-riding guidance, particularly in a single-seat fighter aircraft, were substantial, making the 'Alkali' primarily a short-range anti-bomber missile. Around 1967 the K-5 was replaced by the K-55 (R-55 in service), which replaced the beam-riding seeker with the semi-active radar homing or infrared seekers of the K-13 (AA-2 'Atoll'). The weapon was 7.8 kg (17 lb) heavier than the K-5, but had a smaller 9.1 kg (20 lb) warhead. The K-55 remained in service until about 1977, probably being retired with the last of the Sukhoi Su-9 interceptors.

== Specifications (RS-2US / K-5MS) ==
- Length: 2,500 mm (8 ft 2 in)
- Wingspan: 654 mm (2 ft 1.7 in)
- Diameter: 200 mm (7 7/8 in)
- Launch weight: 82.7 kg (182 lb)
- Speed: 800 m/s (2,880 km/h; 1,790 mph)
- Range: 2–6 km (1 1/4–3 3/4 mi)
- Guidance: beam riding
- Warhead: 13.0 kg (28.7 lb)

== Operators ==
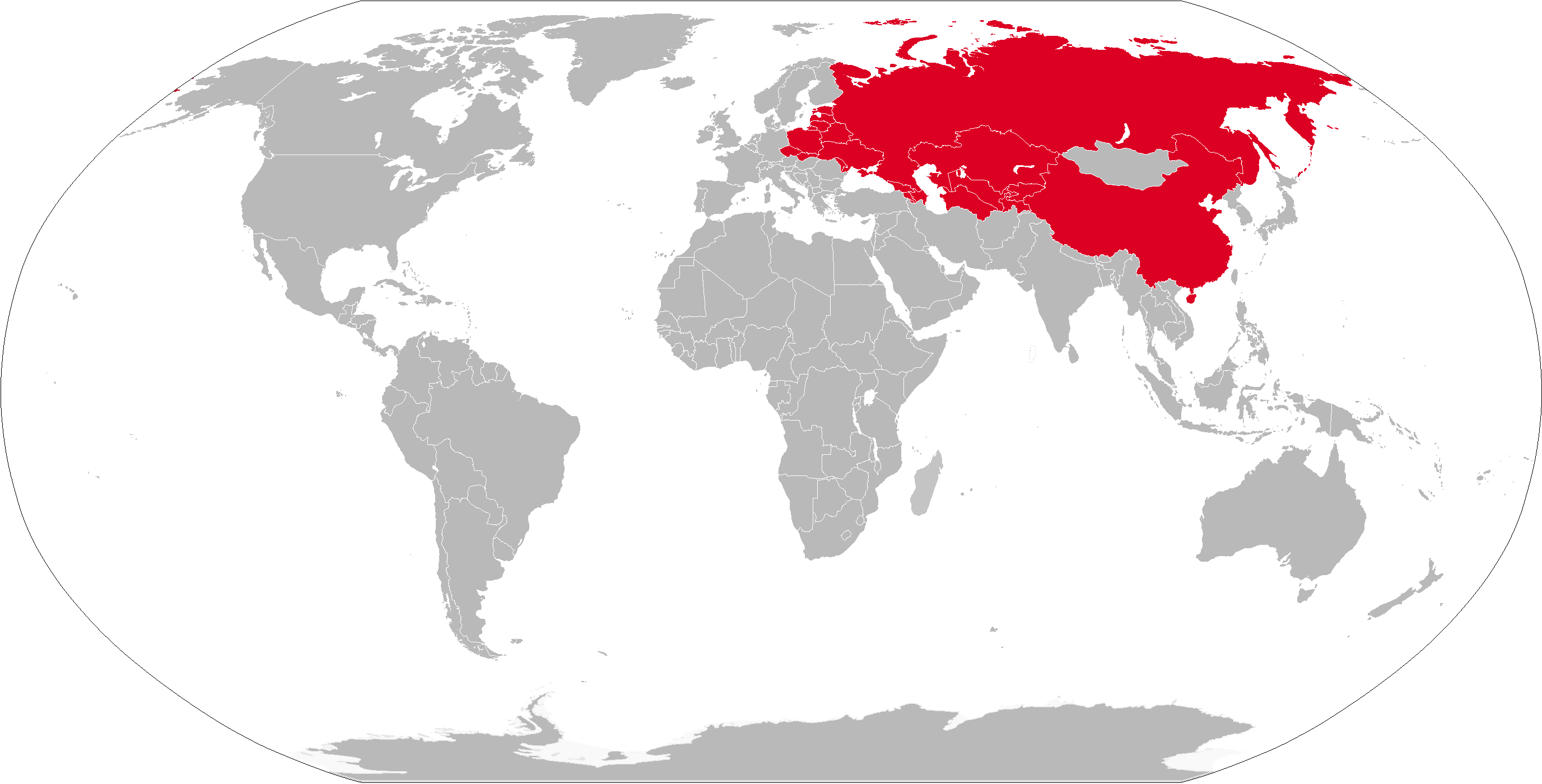
Map with former K-5 operators in red

=== Current operator ===
North Korea
Used on MiG-21PFM.

=== Former operators ===
Soviet Union
Both the Soviet Air Force (VVS) and the Soviet Air Defence Forces (PVO) operated the K-5.
Albania
The Air Force of the Albanian People's Army received 400 PL-1 from China in 1965 and 1966 for its Shenyang F-5 (MiG-17F) aircraft
Bulgaria
Used by the Bulgarian Air Force as late as December 1984
China
The People's Liberation Army Air Force operated licensed Chinese copy of Kaliningrad K-5 designated as PL-1 (PL: short for Pi Li or Pili, meaning thunderbolt).
Cuba
Used by the Cuban Revolutionary Air and Air Defense Force as late as December 1984
Czechoslovakia
The Czechoslovak Air Force operated RS-2U and RS-2US.
East Germany
The Air Forces of the National People's Army operated RS-2U on MiG-19PMs and MiG-21PF.
Hungary
The Hungarian Air Force operated RS-2US on MiG-19PMs, MiG-21PFs and MiG-21MFs.
Iraq
Used by the Iraqi Air Force as late as December 1984
Mali
Malian Air Force
Poland
The Polish Air Force operated RS-2US on MiG-19PMs and MiG-21s. Remained in service as late as December 1984
Romania
Locally produced A-90 copy by Electromecanica Ploiesti (1984)

== See also ==
- List of missiles
