= K-8 (missile) =

K-8 AA-3 Anab
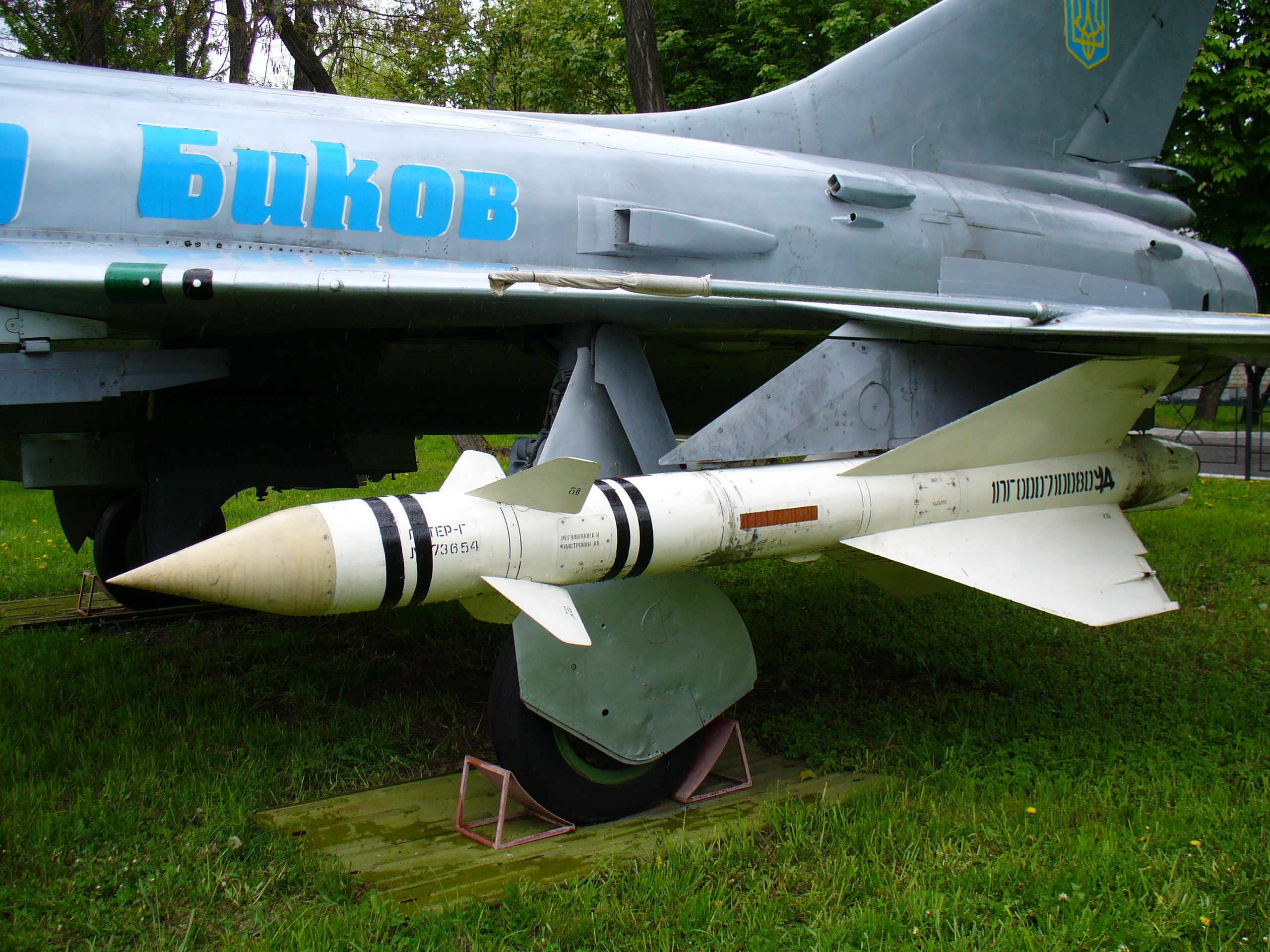
- Type: Medium-range air-to-air missile
- Place of origin: Soviet Union

Service history
- In service: 1960-1992
- Used by: Soviet Air Defense Forces

Production history
- Designer: Matus Bisnovat
- Manufacturer: Kaliningrad Series Production Plant

Specifications (R-98MR)
- Mass: 292 kg (644 lb)
- Length: 4.3 m (14 ft)
- Diameter: 280 mm (11 in)
- Warhead: Blast fragmentation
- Warhead weight: 40 kg (88 lb)
- Engine: Solid-fuel rocket
- Operational range: 23 kilometres (14 mi)
- Maximum speed: Mach 2
- Guidance system: Semi-active radar homing (R-98MR); Infrared homing (R-98MT)
- Launch platform: Su-11, Su-15, Yak-28P

The Kaliningrad K-8 (R-8) (NATO reporting name AA-3 'Anab') was a medium-range air-to-air missile developed by the Soviet Union for interceptor aircraft use.

The K-8 was developed by OKB-339/NII-339 (currently Phazotron NIIR). The infrared seeker was developed by TsKB-589 GKOT (currently TsKB Geofizika), who also developed the seeker for 9M31 missile of 9K31 Strela-1.

== History ==
The K-8's development began in 1955, known as R-8 in service. Like most Soviet air-to-air missiles, it was made with a choice of semi-active radar homing or infrared seeker heads. The original missile was compatible with the Uragan-5B radar used on the Sukhoi Su-11 and several developmental aircraft from Mikoyan-Gurevich.

It was upgraded to R-8M (better known as R-98) standard in 1961, giving the SARH weapon the capability for head-on intercepts. In 1963 it was further upgraded to the R-8M1, making it compatible with the RP-11 Oryol-D radar of the Sukhoi Su-15 and Yakovlev Yak-28P.

Subsequent development led in 1965 to R-8M2, more commonly called R-98, with longer range and improved seekers, compatible with the upgraded RP-11 Oryol-M ("Eagle") radar. The final variant, introduced from 1973, was the R-98M1 (NATO 'Advanced Anab') with better countermeasures resistance and longer range, matched to the Taifun-M radar of the Su-15TM and Yak-28PM interceptors.

The R-98M1 remained in service through the 1980s, being withdrawn with the last Su-15 'Flagon' interceptors.

A short-range variant using development of the K-8 medium-range missile and the Malyutka infrared seeker head being developed for the K-13, was developed in 1960 as the K-88, but it did not enter service, losing out to the K-55 missile.

An inert training version was also developed, designated UR-8M.

Korean Air Lines Flight 007 was shot down by a K-8 launched from an Su-15 on September 1, 1983.

== Operators ==
Soviet Union
Soviet Air Defence Forces

== Specifications (R-98MT / R-98MR) ==
Kaliningrad R-8

- Length: (R-98MT) 4 m (13 ft 1 in); (R-98MR) 4.27 m (14 ft)
- Wingspan: 1300 mm (4 ft 3 in)
- Diameter: 280 mm (11 in)
- Launch weight: (R-98MT) 272 kg (600 lb); (R-98MR) 292 kg (642 lb)
- Speed: Mach 2
- Range: 23 km (14.4 mi)
- Guidance: (R-98MT) infrared homing; (R-98MR) semi-active radar homing
- Warhead: 40 kg (88 lb) blast fragmentation
