= Lyulka AL-7 =

Soviet turbojet aircraft engine

AL-7
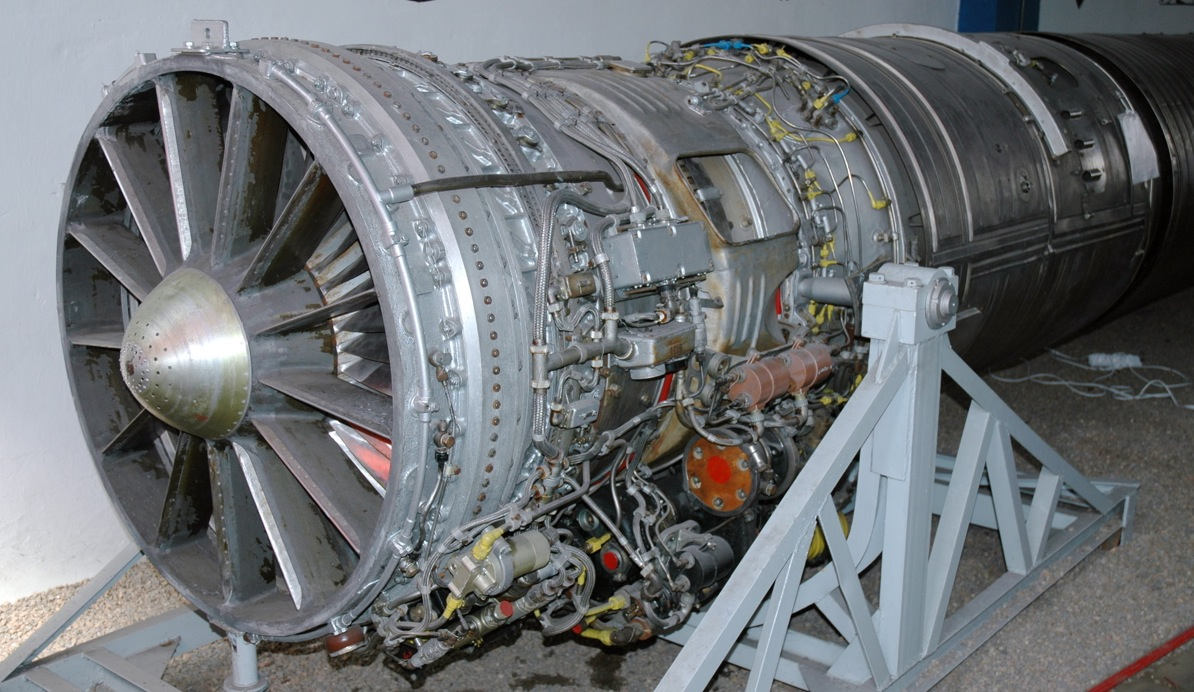
- Lyulka AL-7F turbojet engine at the Polish Aviation Museum
- Type: Turbojet
- Manufacturer: Lyulka
- First run: 1952
- Major applications: Sukhoi Su-7; Sukhoi Su-9; Sukhoi Su-11; Tupolev Tu-28; Beriev Be-10; Kh-20

The Lyulka AL-7 was a turbojet designed by Arkhip Mikhailovich Lyulka and produced by his Lyulka design bureau. The engine was produced between 1954 and 1970.

== Design and development ==
The AL-7 had supersonic airflow through the first stage of the compressor. TR-7 prototype, developing 6,500 kgf (14,330 lb_{f}, 63.7 kN) of thrust, was tested in 1952, and the engine was initially intended for Ilyushin's Il-54 bomber. The afterburning AL-7F version was created in 1953. In April 1956, the Sukhoi S-1 prototype, equipped with the AL-7F, exceeded Mach 2 at 18,000 m (70,900 ft), which led to the production of the Su-7 "Fitter" and Su-9 "Fishpot", equipped with this engine. Later, the engine was adopted for the Tu-128 "Fiddler" in 1960, and for the AS-3 "Kangaroo" cruise missile. The Beriev Be-10 jet flying boat used a non-afterburning AL-7PB with stainless steel compressor blades.

== Variants ==
AL-7
Non-afterburning military turbojet.
AL-7F
Afterburning versions of the AL-7F, typically, the AL-7F1-100 used in the Sukhoi T-49.

== Specifications (AL-7F) ==
Data from

==== General characteristics ====
- Type: Afterburning turbojet
- Length: 6,650 mm (262 in)
- Diameter: 1,300 mm (51 in)
- Dry weight: 2,010 kg (4,430 lb)

==== Components ====
- Compressor: Single-spool turbojet 9-stage axial compressor
- Combustors: Annular
- Turbine: 2-stage axial

==== Performance ====
- Maximum thrust:
- 67.1 kN (15,075 lbf) military power
- 98.1 kN (22,050 lbf) with afterburner
- Overall pressure ratio: 9.5:1
- Turbine inlet temperature: 860 °C (1,580 °F)
- Specific fuel consumption:
- 95.0 kg/(h·kN) (0.94 lb/(h·lbf)) at idle
- 98.9 kg/(h·kN) (0.97 lb/(h·lbf)) military power
- 229.0 kg/(h·kN) with afterburner
- Thrust-to-weight ratio: 3.4; 5.0 with afterburner

== See also ==
Related development

- Lyulka AL-21
- Lyulka AL-31

Related lists

- List of aircraft engines
