= Fitter =

Fitter may refer to

== People ==
- Alastair Fitter (born 1948), British ecologist
- Daniel Fitter (1628–1700), English Catholic clergyman
- David Fitter (born 1980), retired Australian rugby union player
- R. S. R. Fitter (1913–2005), British naturalist and author

== Other uses ==
- NATO reporting name Sukhoi Su-17, a Soviet attack aircraft developed from the Su-7
- Fitter (occupation), a person who uses hand tools and machine tools to make or modify parts
- Fitter (arcade game), a Taito release of the game Round-Up

== See also ==
- Fitter-A, NATO designation for the Sukhoi Su-7, a Soviet attack aircraft
- Fitr
- Eid al-Fitr
- Fitting (disambiguation)
