= Sukhoi Su-7 =

Soviet strike fighter aircraft

Su-7
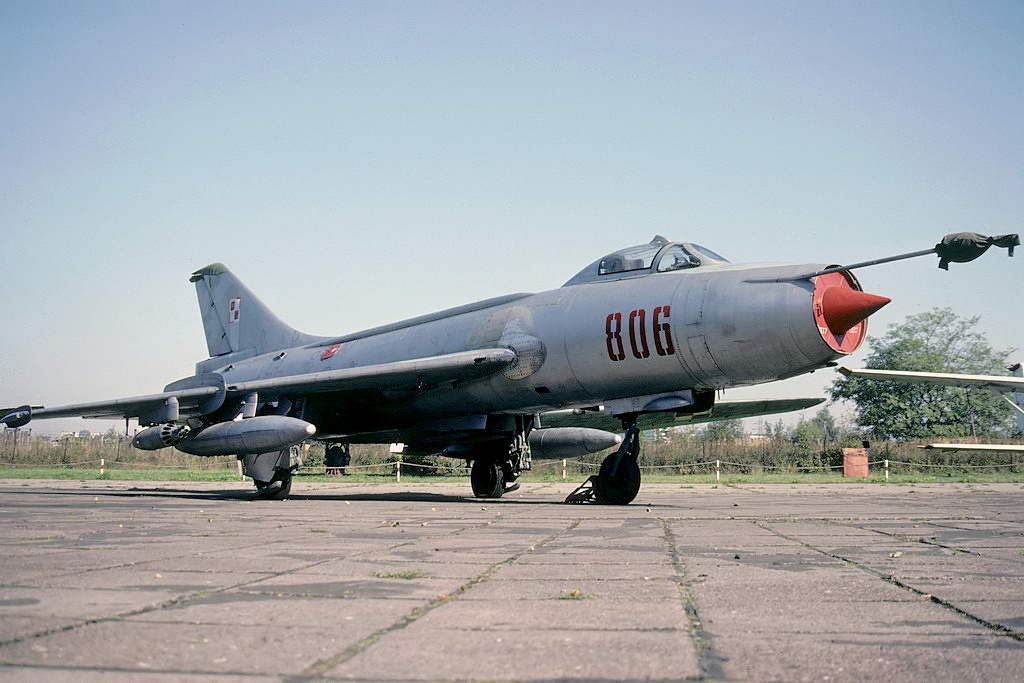
- A Polish Su-7BKL photographed in 1991.

General information
- Type: Fighter and fighter-bomber / ground-attack aircraft
- National origin: Soviet Union
- Manufacturer: Sukhoi
- Status: In limited service with the Korean People's Army Air Force
- Primary users: Soviet Air Forces (historical): Indian Air Force (historical); North Korean Air Force (historical)
- Number built: 1,847

History
- Manufactured: 1957–1972
- Introduction date: 1959
- First flight: 7 September 1955
- Developed into: Sukhoi Su-17

The Sukhoi Su-7 (NATO designation name: Fitter-A) is a swept wing, supersonic fighter aircraft developed by the Soviet Union in 1955. Originally, it was designed as a tactical, low-level dogfighter, but was not successful in this role. On the other hand, the soon-introduced Su-7B series became the main Soviet fighter-bomber and ground-attack aircraft of the 1960s. The Su-7 was rugged in its simplicity, but its Lyulka AL-7 engine had such high fuel consumption that it seriously limited the aircraft's payload, as even short-range missions required that at least two hardpoints be used to carry drop tanks rather than ordnance.

== Design and development ==
After Joseph Stalin's death, the Sukhoi OKB was reopened and by the summer, it began work on a swept-wing front-line (Note: In Soviet terminology, the front-line fighter (frontovoi istrebitel, фронтовой истребитель; also called frontal or tactical fighter) is the one that is intended to be operationally deployed within fronts for use over the battlefield, as opposed to interceptor aircraft deployed by Soviet Air Defence Forces (PVO).) fighter. The first prototype, designated S-1, was designed to use the new Lyulka AL-7 turbojet engine. It was the first Soviet aircraft to utilize the all-moving tailplane and a translating centerbody, a movable inlet cone in the air intake for managing airflow to the engine at supersonic speeds. The aircraft also had a wing sweep of 60°, irreversible hydraulically boosted controls, and an ejection seat of Sukhoi’s own design.

The S-1 first flew on 7 September 1955 with A. G. Kochetkov at the controls. Fitted with an afterburning version of the AL-7 engine after the first eleven flights, the prototype set a Soviet speed record of 2,170 km/h (1,170 kn, 1,350 mph, Mach 2.04) in April 1956. The prototype was intended to be armed with three 37 mm Nudelman N-37 cannons and 32 spin-stabilized 57 mm (2.25 in) unguided rockets in a ventral tray. The second prototype, S-2, introduced some aerodynamic refinements. Testing was complicated by the unreliable engine, and S-1 was lost in a crash on 23 November 1956, killing its pilot I. N. Sokolov. Only 132 were produced between 1957 and 1960, and the aircraft entered service as Su-7 in 1959.

=== Su-7A fighter ===
The first production variant: a frontline fighter that saw limited operational use in the Far East from 1958. However, in 1959, a decision was made to prioritize production of the MiG-21, thus less than 200 Su-7As were deployed. The Su-7A was retired in 1965 with operational deployment.

=== Su-7B fighter-bomber ===
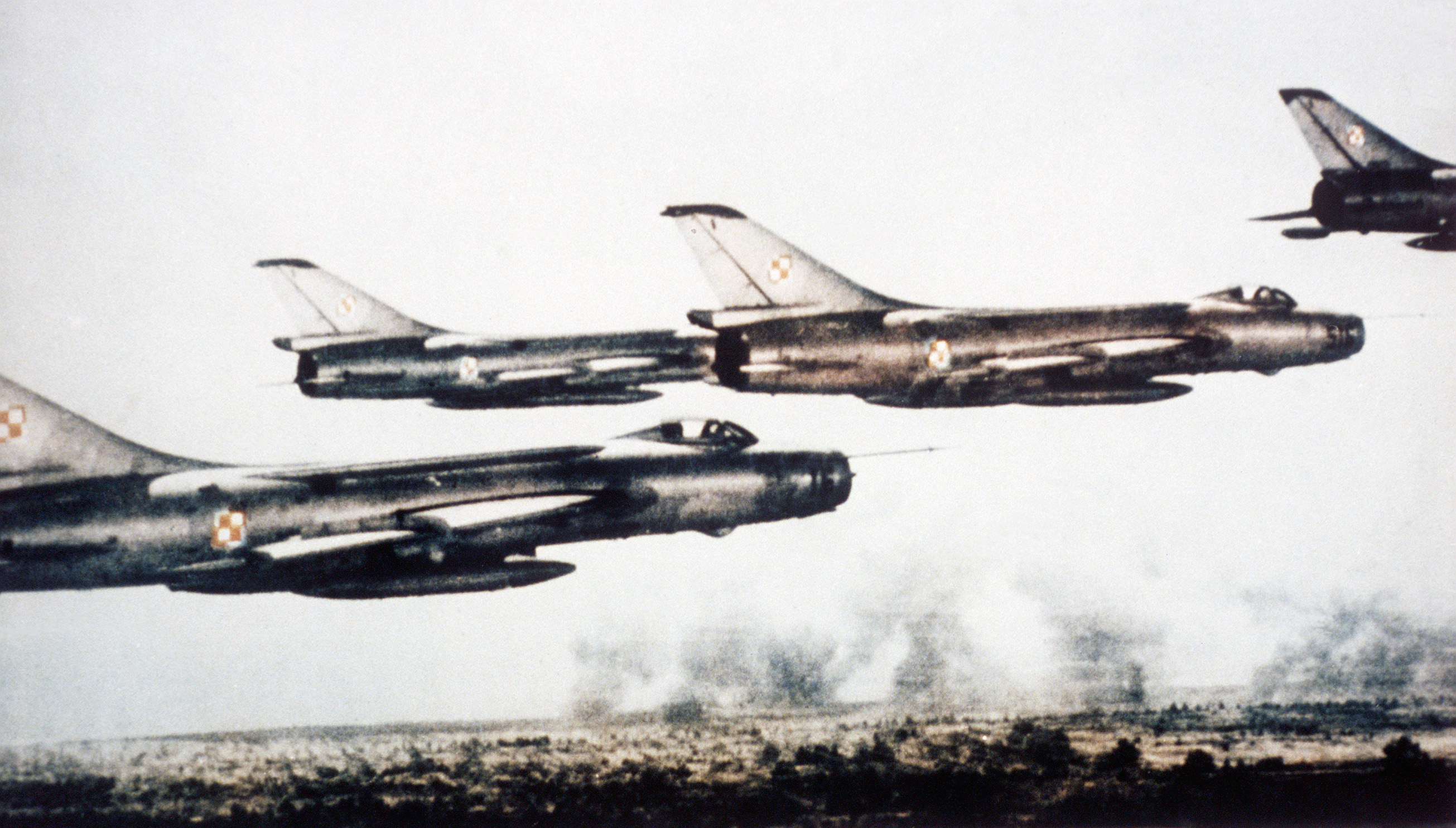
Su-7s of the Polish Air Force.

On July 31, 1958, Soviet tactical aviation (Frontovaya Aviatsiya, фронтовая авиация) tasked Sukhoi with developing a ground-attack variant of the Su-7, which could replace the scrapped Ilyushin Il-40. The resulting prototype, designated the S-22, incorporated structural refinements for low-altitude operations at high-speed. The prototype first flew in March 1959; entering service in 1961 as the Su-7B.

Operationally, Su-7s were hampered by a high landing speed of 340–360 km/h. This was dictated by the highly swept wing. Combined with poor visibility from the cockpit and the lack of an instrument landing system, operations were very difficult, especially in poor weather or airfields. In 1961–1962, Sukhoi experimented with blown flaps on S-25 but the benefit was too small to warrant implementation. JATO rockets tested on S-22-4 proved more useful and were incorporated into the Su-7BKL. Attempts to improve takeoff and landing performance eventually resulted in the variable geometry Sukhoi Su-17.

The Su-7B and its variants became the main Soviet ground-attack aircraft of the 1960s. They were also widely exported (691 planes, including some trainers). However, the very short combat radius and need for long runways limited the Su-7's operational usefulness. On the other hand, despite its notoriously heavy controls, the Su-7 was popular with pilots for its docile flight characteristics, simple controls and considerable speed even at low altitudes. It also had a reputation for easy maintenance.

In 1977–1986 the Su-7s remaining in Soviet service were replaced by Su-17s and MiG-27s.

== Operational history ==
=== Algeria ===
Algeria ordered an unknown number of Su-7s for the Algerian Air Force, which were delivered around 1971 and 1972 consisting of single seaters and some dual seaters. By the end of 1986, there were at least 20 Su-7BMKs and eight Su-7UMKs in service, with the type withdrawn from service in the later 1980s.

=== Afghanistan ===
The Afghan Republican Air Force received an unknown number of Su-7s (and later, more advanced derivatives) and used them extensively during the Afghan civil war and the Soviet Intervention. A number were lost, including at least one defected to Pakistan on 20 November, 1983.

=== Egypt ===
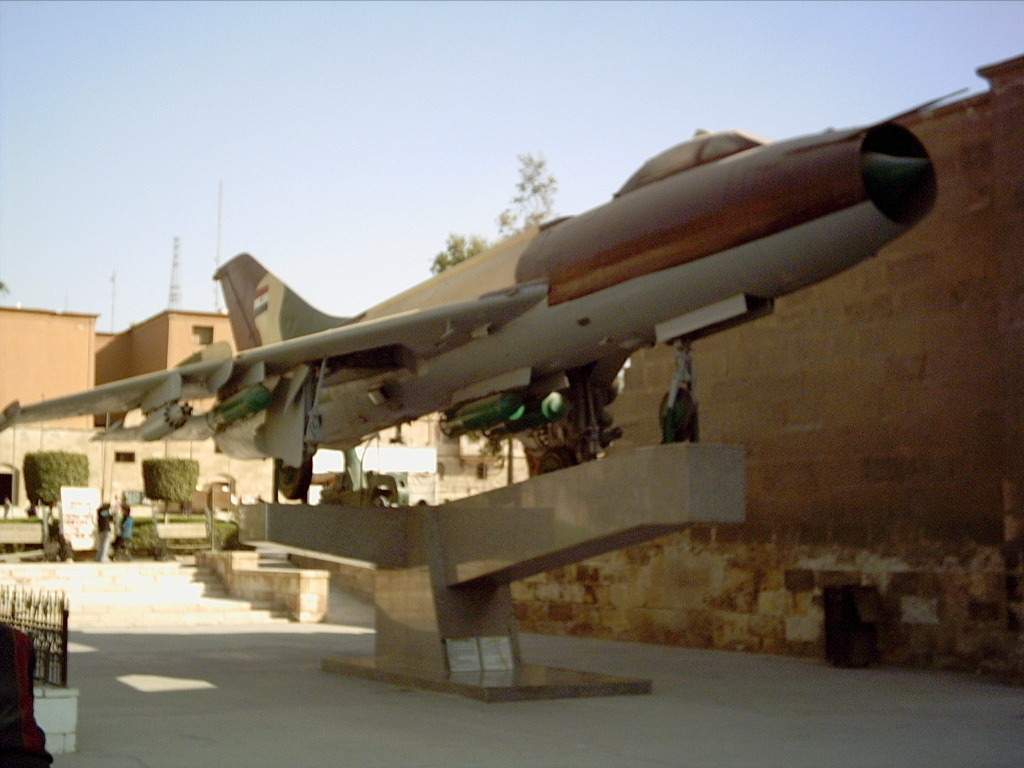
An Egyptian Su-7BMK displayed in the Egyptian Military Museum in Cairo Citadel.

The Su-7 saw combat with Egypt in the 1967 Six-Day War, the subsequent War of Attrition, and saw use in the Yom Kippur War by the Egyptians to attack Israeli ground forces.

=== India ===
India acquired 140 Su-7s from the Soviet Union in 1967 as part of a US$100 Million deal. The last Su-7s were retired in the 1980s. They were used to equip the No. 26 Squadron "Warriors" formed in March 1968, No. 32 Squadron "Thunderbirds" (formed in 1969), No. 101 Squadron "The Falcons" (formed July 1968), No. 221 Squadron "Valiants" (formed in August 1968) and No. 222 Squadron "The Killers" (formed in 1969).

==== 1971 Indo-Pakistan War ====
The Indian Air Force (IAF) used the Su-7 extensively in the 1971 war with Pakistan. Six squadrons, totaling 140 aircraft, flew almost 1,500 offensive sorties during the war, and undertook the bulk of the daytime attack missions. The IAF managed to retain a very high operational tempo with its Su-7s, peaking at a sortie rate of six per pilot per day. Fourteen or nineteen Su-7s were lost during the war, mostly due to anti-aircraft fire.

After the war, it was found that the aircraft had high survivability, being able to fly home safely despite receiving heavy damage, resulting in many disputed kills. For example, Wing Commander H.S. Mangat's Su-7 was badly damaged by a PL-2 missile fired by a Pakistan Air Force F-6. The impact was so severe that half the rudder was missing, the elevators, ailerons, and flaps were severely damaged, and half the missile was stuck in the chute pipe. The pilot made it back to his base. The death of at least one Indian pilot can be attributed, at least indirectly, to poor cockpit design. A pilot had moved his seating forward to a dangerous position, "because he found the bombsight and the front gun sight easier to operate" while in that position and was killed on ejection.

Indian Su-7BMKs shot down at least two Shenyang F-6s in the 1971 war, while losing three Su-7s to F-6s according to Pakistani sources, mostly during bombing runs.

=== Syria ===
Syria and Iraq both received their first SU-7s from the Soviet Union in 1968, with the Syrians receiving 25 airframes in an initial batch followed by more purchases in the lead up to the 1973 Arab-Israeli war. These Su-7s were used intensively, primarily for ground attack and support missions and were valued for their supersonic performance and hard punch, and when the war broke out, the Syrian Air Force Command - let by Major General Najr Jamil - had about 80 Fitter-As ready for combat (not counting a number of Iraqi SU-7s also based in Syria at the time). SU-7s were used intensively and especially in low level attacks which the Israelis had a lot of trouble detecting and intercepting (in comparison to the MiG-21s flying top cover for the Fitters and MiG-17s). After the war, during which the Syrians suffered considerable losses, 35 SU-7s were supplied by the Russians as replacements or extra airframes, and they would be in Syrian service until the 1990s before being phased out.

== Variants ==
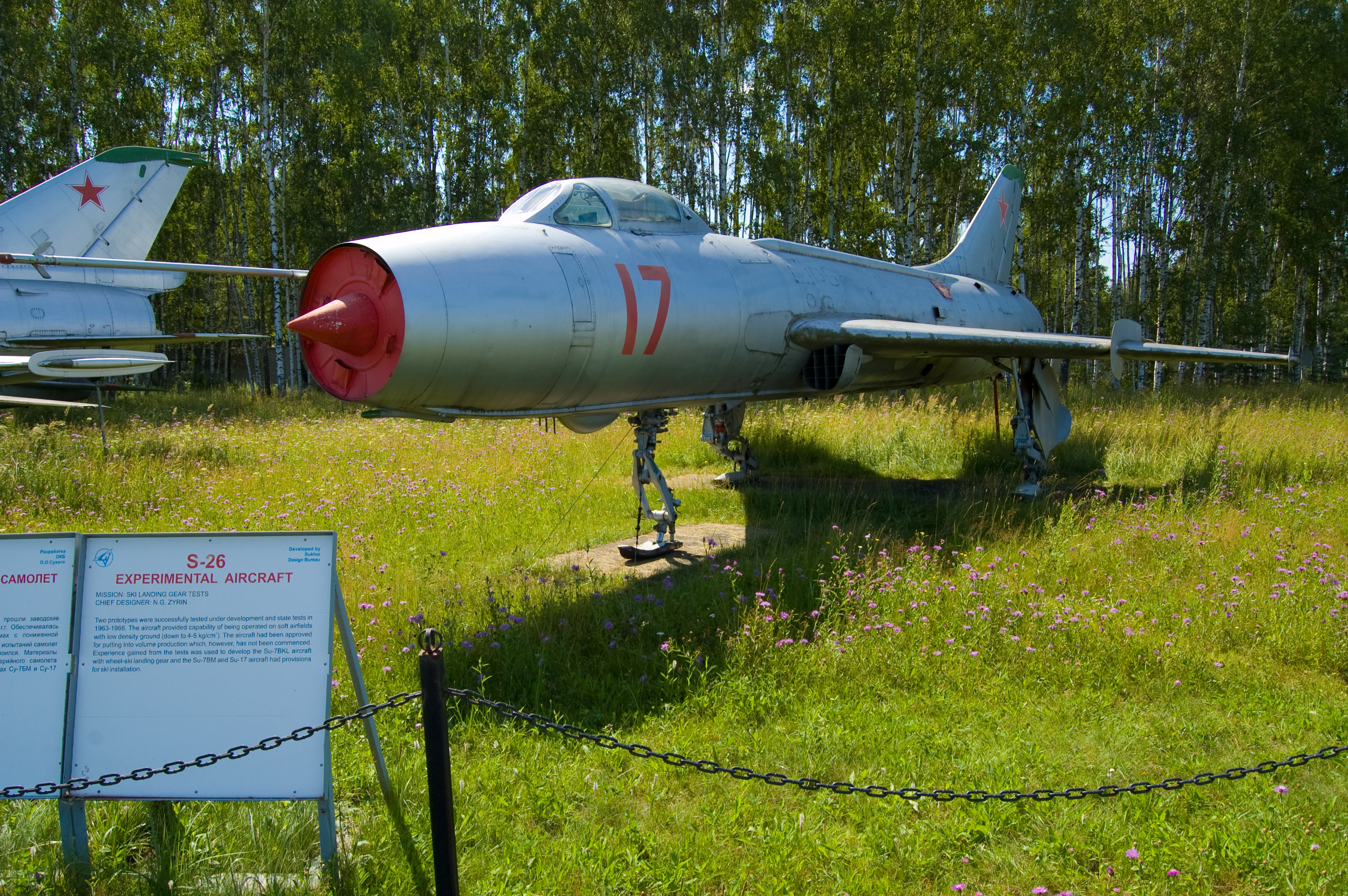
S-26 on display at Monino.

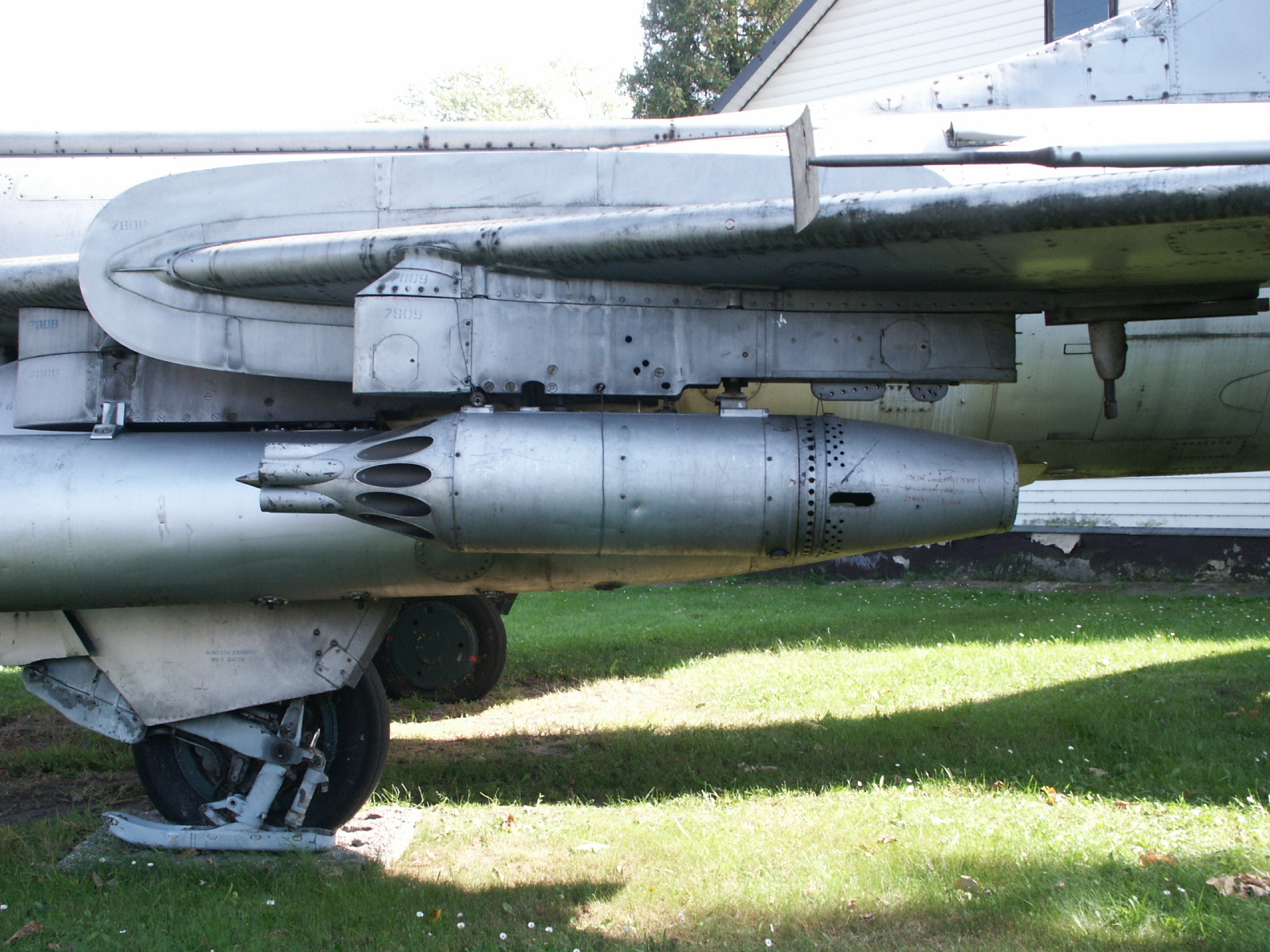
Su-7BKL landing gear with the unique skid, and a UB-16 57 mm rocket launcher

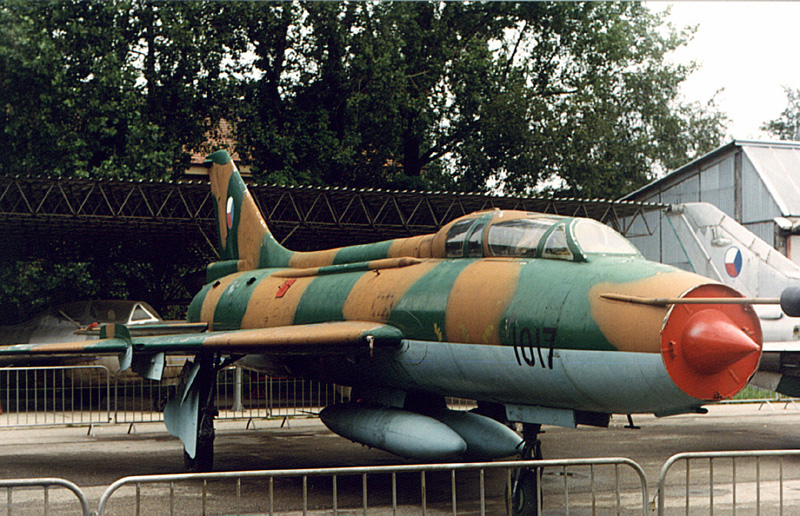
Two-seat trainer variant Su-7UMK (NATO designation: Moujik)

A total of 1,847 Su-7 and its variants were built.

Su-7A
First production version. The only production version that was a tactical air superiority fighter. Factory designation S-2. Manufactured 1957–1960 with 132 built. Remained in operational service until 1965.
Su-7B
The first ground-attack version, factory designation S-22. Manufactured 1960–1962 with 431 built.
Su-7BM
Upgraded AL-7F-1 engine, upgraded fuel system with external piping on either side of the fuselage spine, fuel tanks installed in the wings, "wet" underwing hardpoints for carrying external fuel tanks, capable of carrying tactical nuclear bombs. Manufactured 1963–1965 with 290 built.
Su-7BKL
Rough field-capable variant with skids fixed to the sides of the main landing gear, provision for two SPRD-110 JATO rockets of 29.4 kN (13,300 lbf) thrust, and twin brake parachutes. Introduced in 1965, factory designation S-22KL. Manufactured 1965–1972 with 267 built.
Su-7BMK
A simplified export version of the Su-7BM. Manufactured 1967–1971 with 441 built.
Su-7U (NATO Moujik)
Two-seat trainer version of the Su-7B with reduced fuel capacity. First flight 25 October 1965. Manufactured 1966–1972 in parallel with the export version, designated Su-7UMK.
Su-7UM (NATO Moujik)
Two-seat training version of the Su-7BM.
Su-7UMK (NATO Moujik)
Two-seat training version of the Su-7BMK. All Su-7 trainers amounted to 411 built.
Su-7IG
Experimental variable geometry wing aircraft which was developed into Sukhoi Su-17.
100LDU Control Configured Vehicle
A Su-7U modified with canards and a longitudinal stability augmentation system. It was designed as a testbed for a fly-by-wire system for the Sukhoi T-4. It was later used in 1973–1974 during the development of the Su-27's fly-by-wire system.

=== OKB-51 designations ===
S-1
(Strelovidnoye [krylo] – swept wings) OKB-51 designation for the first prototype of the Su-7 / Su-9 family.
S-2
OKB-51 designation for the first production version of the Su-7.
S-22
OKB-51 designation for the Su-7B production aircraft.
S-22-2
OKB-51 designation for the prototype of the Su-7BM.
S-22M
OKB-51 designation for the Su-7BM production aircraft.
S-22KL
OKB-51 designation for the Su-7BKL production aircraft, incorporating the short field equipment tested on the S-22-4.
S-23
As a precursor to the S-22-4 tests, the S-23 was tested with a pure ski undercarriage and with skis on the main legs only
S-22-4
An S-22 tested with wheel / ski undercarriage, brake parachute and SPRD-110 JATO boosters for rough/unpaved field operations.
S-25
This aircraft was used for Boundary Layer Control (BLC) tests, with compressor bleed air blown over the leading edges to reduce takeoff length.
S-25T
A Su-7 fitted with the Boundary Layer Control system, rigged especially for use in a full-scale wind tunnel.
S-26
A continuation of the S-22-4 testing with wheel/ski undercarriage, double brake parachute and JATO boosters (The S-26 survives on display at the Russian Air Force Museum, Monino).
S-22MK
A simplified export version of the Su-7BKL, designated Su-7BMK
U-22
A belated trainer version with two seats in tandem in an extended nose based on the Su-7BM.
U-22MK
OKB-51 designation for the export version of the Su-7U, designated Su-7UMK by the Soviet Air Force
S-3
A projected interceptor version of the S-2, with "Izumrud" radar and avionic equipment in a reconfigured nose section.
S-41
OKB-51 designation for an experimental version of the S-1/S-2 with a lengthened nose and area-ruled rear fuselage.
T-1
A delta-wing tactical fighter project, based on the S-2, cancelled with the prototype nearly complete.
T-3
A delta-winged interceptor version of the S-2, developed in parallel to the S-3 and T-1. This would eventually lead to the T-43 prototype of the Su-9 interceptor.

== Operators ==
Military operators of the Su-7
Current	Former

=== Former operators ===
Afghanistan

- Afghan Air Force – 24 Su-7BMK and 16 Su-7U trainers, were delivered to Afghanistan from 1972. Constant fighting, a high accident rate in the high altitude and poor maintenance caused substantial attrition. An additional 79 used replacements from Soviet stocks were supplied during the 1980s. None remain in service.

Algeria

- Algerian Air Force – 40 Su-7BMK.

Czechoslovakia

- Czechoslovak Air Force – the Czechoslovak Air Force was the first foreign operator of the Su-7 in 1963. Totals included 64 Su-7BM, 31 Su-7BKL and Su-7U. During operations service, 30 aircraft were lost in accidents. The remaining aircraft were phased out in 1990.

Egypt

- Egyptian Air Force – The first batch of 14 Su-7BMK was destroyed during the Six-Day War. From 1967–1972, Egypt received an additional 185 Su-7BMK/SU-7UMK. Those which survived the Yom Kippur War with Israel were retired in the mid-1980s.

India

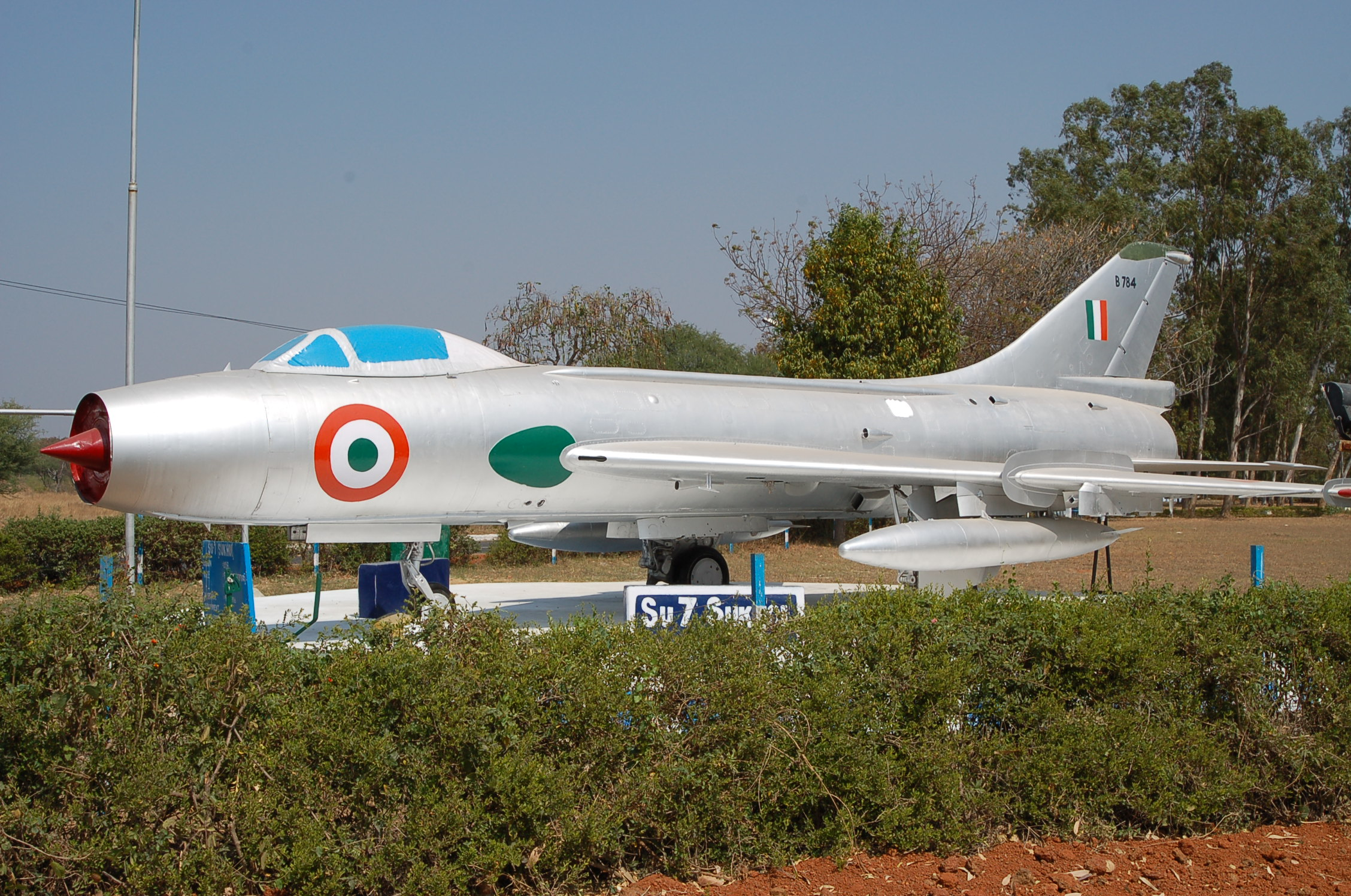
Indian Air Force Sukhoi Su-7 preserved at the Indian Air Force Academy Museum

- Indian Air Force – 140 were delivered in 1968, equipping six squadrons. An additional 14 attrition replacements were provided. The last aircraft were retired in 1986.

Iraq

- Iraqi Air Force – The first contract for up to 34 Su-7BMK was signed in 1965, with deliveries starting in the spring of 1967. An additional order for 20 Su-7BMK was signed in July 1967. No longer in service.

Poland

- Polish Air Force – operated 6 Su-7BM, 33 Su-7BKŁ and 8 Su-7U from July 1964 until June 1990; no longer in service.

Soviet Union

- Soviet Air Force

Syria

- Syrian Air Force – Shortly after the Six-Day War of 1967, Syria received 25 Su-7s. During the 1973 Yom Kippur War, Syria lost most of the aircraft supplied. After 1973, The Soviet Union resupplied Syria with 35 more aircraft. By the mid 1980s, the Su-7 had been transferred to the reserves, and by the 1990s were decommissioned.

== Specifications (Su-7BKL) ==
3-view drawing of Sukhoi Su-7

Data from Green, Sukhoi

General characteristics

- Crew: 1
- Length: 16.8 m (55 ft 1 in)
- Wingspan: 9.31 m (30 ft 7 in)
- Height: 4.99 m (16 ft 4 in)
- Wing area: 34 m^{2} (370 sq ft)
- Airfoil: root: TsAGI SR-3S (5.9%); tip: TsAGI SR-3S (4.7%)
- Empty weight: 8,940 kg (19,709 lb)
- Gross weight: 13,570 kg (29,917 lb)
- Max takeoff weight: 15,210 kg (33,532 lb)
- Fuel capacity: 3,220 kg (7,099 lb)
- Powerplant: 1 × Lyulka AL-7F-1 afterburning turbojet, 66.6 kN (15,000 lbf) thrust dry, 94.1 kN (21,200 lbf) with afterburner

Performance

- Maximum speed: 1,150 km/h (710 mph, 620 kn) / 0.94 at sea level

2,150 km/h (1,340 mph; 1,160 kn) / M1.74 at high altitude

- Range: 1,650 km (1,030 mi, 890 nmi)
- Service ceiling: 17,600 m (57,700 ft)
- Rate of climb: 160 m/s (31,000 ft/min)
- Wing loading: 434.8 kg/m^{2} (89.1 lb/sq ft)
- Thrust/weight: 0.71

Armament

- Guns: 2 × 30 mm Nudelman-Rikhter NR-30 autocannons (70 rounds per gun, 140 rounds total)
- Hardpoints: 4 × under-wing & 2 × under-fuselage stations for 2,000 kg (4,400 lb) of disposable stores. 2 × reserved for 2,300 L (510 imp gal; 610 US gal) drop tanks , with provisions to carry combinations of:
  - Rockets: UB-16-57U rocket pods for S-5 rockets
  - Bombs:
    - FAB-250 general-purpose bomb
    - FAB-500 GP bomb
    - 8U69 nuclear bomb

== See also ==
Related development

- Su-17/Su-20/Su-22
- Sukhoi Su-9
- Sukhoi Su-11

Aircraft of comparable role, configuration, and era

- Dassault Mirage V
- HAL HF-24 Marut
- Hawker Hunter
- Nanchang Q-5
- Republic F-105 Thunderchief

Related lists

- List of military aircraft of the Soviet Union and the CIS
