= Sukhoi Su-9 =

1959–1970s Soviet interceptor aircraft

Su-9
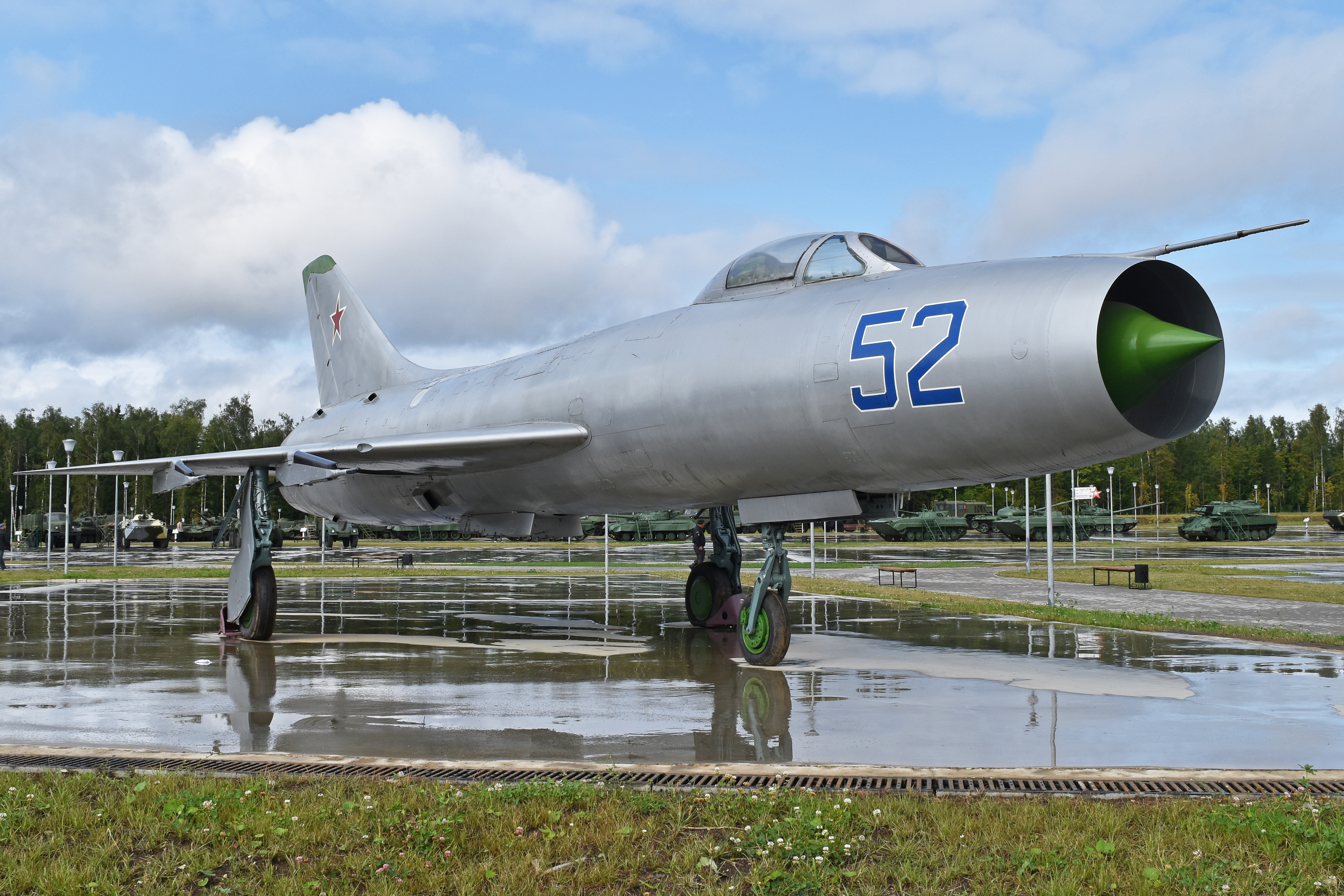

General information
- Type: Interceptor aircraft
- National origin: Soviet Union
- Manufacturer: Sukhoi
- Primary user: Soviet Air Defense Forces
- Number built: 1,150

History
- Introduction date: 1959
- First flight: June 24, 1956
- Retired: 1970s
- Developed from: Sukhoi T-3
- Variant: Sukhoi Su-11

The Sukhoi Su-9 (ASCC reporting name: Fishpot) is a single-engine, all-weather, missile-armed interceptor aircraft developed by the Soviet Union.

== Design and Development ==
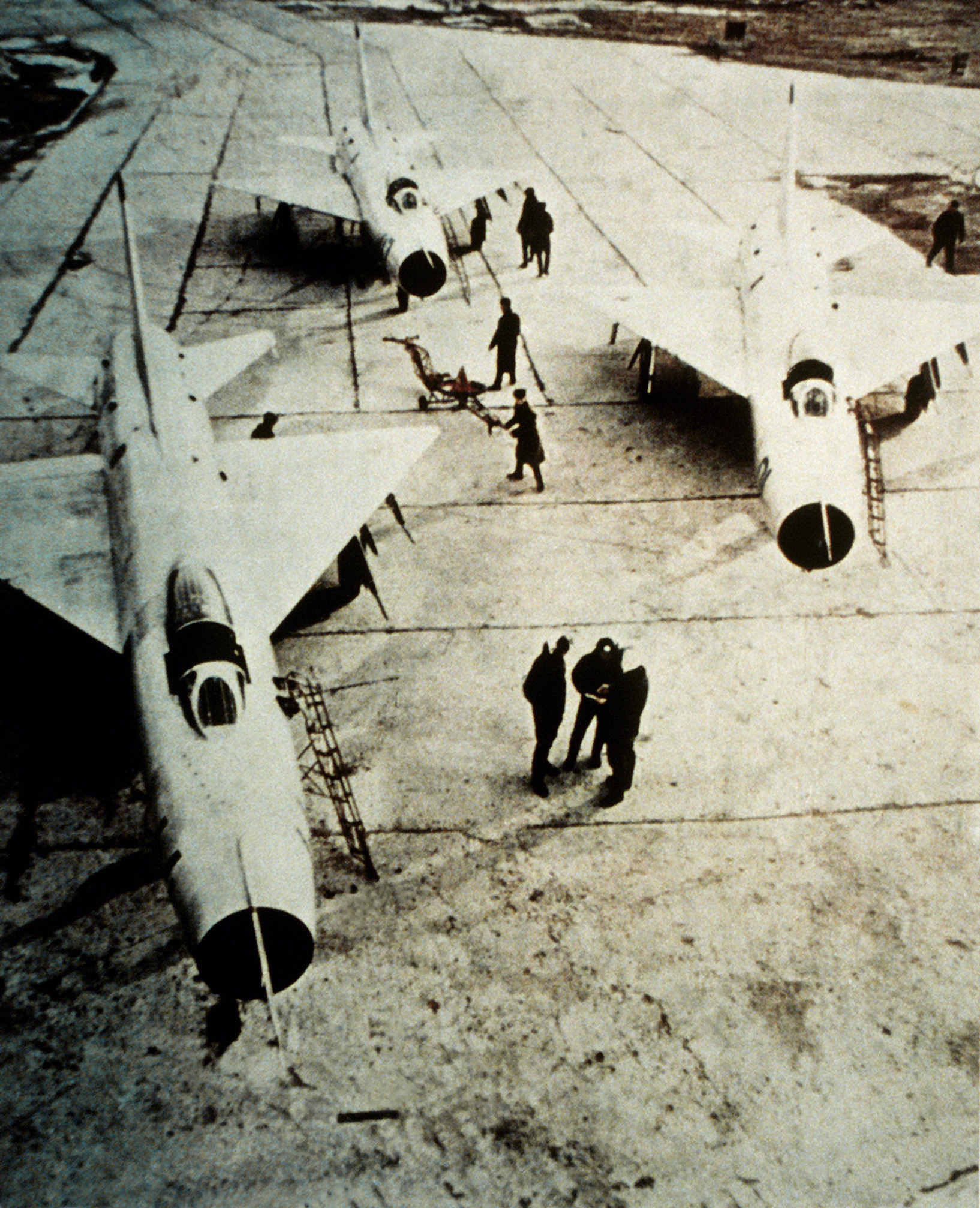
Three Su-9 aircraft in 1982

The Su-9 emerged from aerodynamic studies by TsAGI, the Soviet aerodynamic center, during and after the Korean War, which devised several optimum aerodynamic configurations for jet fighters. The design first flew in 1956 as the T-405 prototype. The Su-9 was developed at the same time as the Su-7 "Fitter", and the West first saw both at the Tushino Aviation Day on June 24, 1956, where the Su-9 was dubbed Fitter-B.

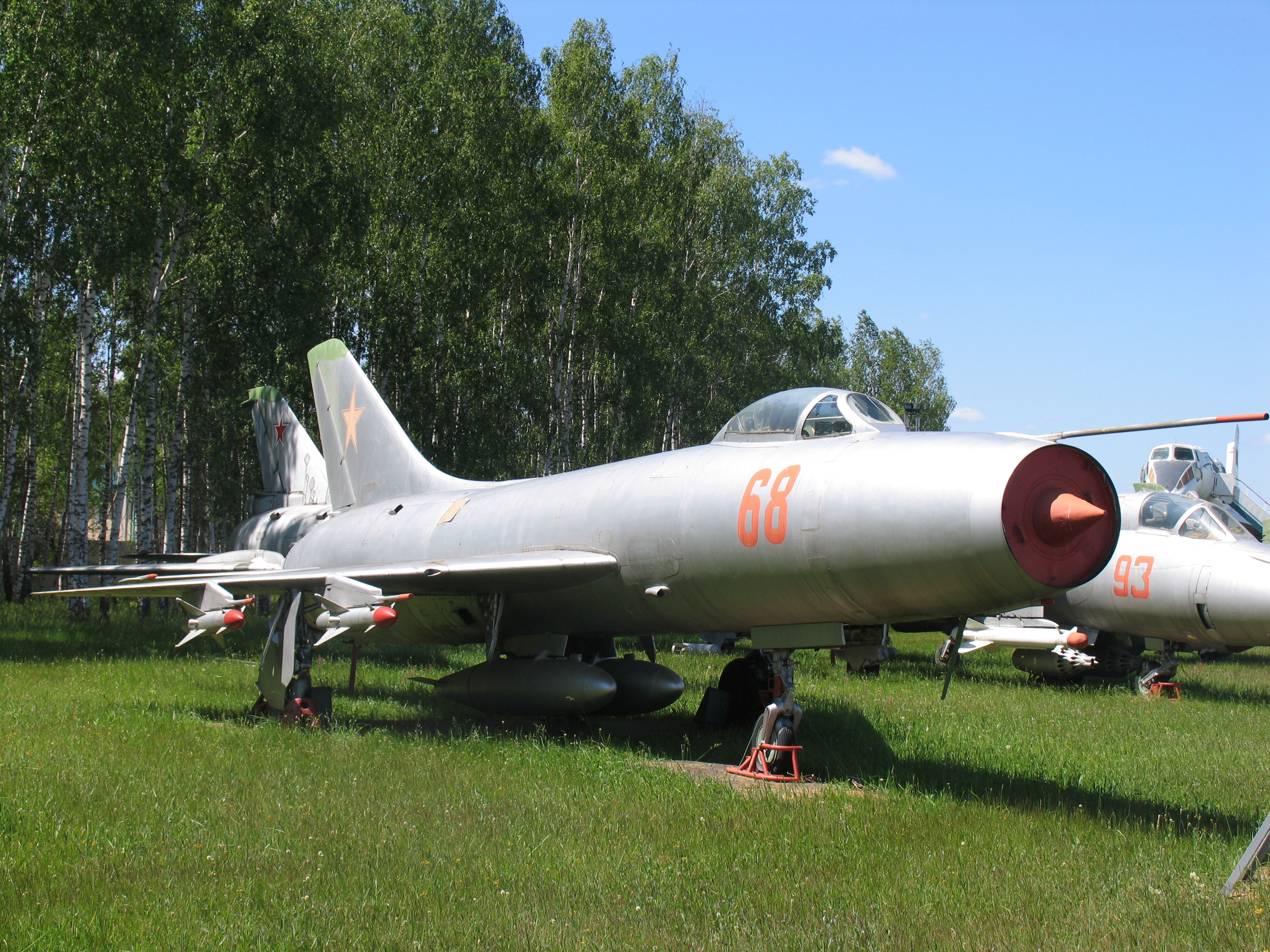
Sukhoi Su-9 in Monino museum

The total production of the Su-9 was about 1,100 aircraft. It is believed that at least some Su-9s were upgraded to Su-11 "Fishpot-C" form. The Su-9's fuselage and tail surfaces resembled those of the Su-7, but unlike the swept wing of that aircraft, the "Fishpot" used a 53° delta wing with conventional slab tailplanes. It shared Sukhoi features like the rear-fuselage air brakes as well as the Su-7's Lyulka AL-7 turbojet engine and nose intake. The translating shock cone contains the radar set.

The Su-9 was developed from earlier work on a developmental aircraft designated T-3, to which the Su-9 was nearly identical. Internally at Sukhoi, the Su-9 was known as the T-43. The delta wing of the Su-9 was adopted because of its lower drag in the supersonic flight regime. Its greater volume also allowed a modest fuel capacity increase compared to the Su-7. The Su-9 was capable of Mach 1.8 at altitude or about Mach 1.14 with missiles. However, its fuel fraction remained minimal, and its operational radius was limited. Furthermore, rotation speeds were even higher than the Su-7, which was already high at 360 km/h (225 mph). Unlike the Su-7, which had cumbersome controls but docile handling characteristics, the "Fishpot" had light and responsive controls but was unforgiving of pilot error.

The Su-9 had a TsD-30 radar in the shock cone and was armed with four K-5 (AA-1 "Alkali") beam-riding air-to-air missiles. Like all beam-riders, the K-5 was so limited as to be nearly useless for air-to-air combat. With the K-5 later on being replaced with K-55/R-55 IR homing short range missiles. Unlike the Su-7 and later Su-15, Su-9 carried no cannon armament, although two fuselage pylons were reserved for the carriage of drop tanks.

The PVO attached special non-jettisonable large-capacity ferry tanks for their initial ferry flights, and a conformal ventral tank was proposed in November 1959 (fitted to two external hardpoints in a similar way to the BF-110) but this idea was not implemented as the air force demanded an emergency jettison option. Early production airframes were very limited in their interception range, with a range of around 320-450 Km (200-280 Miles) for a target at 20,000 Meters (65,000 feet) with later production airframes having an increase in internal fuel capacity, resulting in a range of about 430 - 600 Kms (270-370 Miles).

A two-seat trainer version designated Su-9U was also produced in limited numbers (about 50 aircraft). It received the NATO reporting name "Maiden." It had a full armament and radar system with displays in both cockpits, allowing trainees to practice all aspects of the interception mission. Still, because the second seat further reduced the already meager fuel fraction, it was not generally combat-capable.

The Su-9 has been frequently mistaken for the MiG-21 due to the many similarities in design. The primary distinguishing features are the Su-9's larger size and its bubble canopy.

== Operational History ==
On September 4, 1959 a modified Su-9 (designated T-431 by the bureau) piloted by Vladimir Sergeievitch Ilyushin set a new world record for absolute height, at 28,852 m (94,658 ft). In November of the same year, Ilyushin set several new sustained speed/altitude records in the same aircraft. This record was later broken on December 6, 1959, by Commander Lawrence E. Flint Jr., who performed a zoom climb to a world record of 98,557 feet (30,040 meters) while piloting an F4H-1 Phantom.

The Su-9 achieved initial operational capability in 1959 with the PVO, serving as a replacement for the subsonic MiG-17PF (primarily a cannon equipped interceptor) and the MiG-19PM missile interceptor. The first unit equipped with the aircraft were based out of Novosibirsk-Tolmachovo Airfield near aircraft factory No.153, near the town of Novosibirsk-Yel'tsvoka in Jun 1959, allowing close support for the aircraft type as it entered service with the supersonic aircraft being very new and challenging for flight and ground crews alike to adapt to with its new technology and complexity, which was common practice in the Soviet Union, and useful considering the new aircraft's speed and delta wing design.

The first combat action of the Su-9 came on April 9, 1960 when a U-2 piloted by Francis Gary Powers overflew the Soviet Union after taking off from Peshawar, Pakistan. Several aircraft from a unit based out of Turkmenistan were scrambled, but being new to their aircraft and given faulty instructions from Ground Control, they were unable to intercept the U-2. It was believed by the Central Intelligence Agency that the Soviets were unable to intercept any targets flying at that altitude (20,000 Meters or 65,000 feet).

On May 1, 1960 an unarmed Su-9 was directed to ram a U-2 flown by Powers. One ramming attempt was made, but the Su-9 missed the U-2 due to the significant difference in the speed of the two planes. Due to the Su-9's lack of fuel, the pilot elected to break away from the U-2 and continue with the original flight plan. Its pilot, Captain Igor Mentyukov, later claimed that his slipstream caused the U-2 to break apart. He discounts the official version that the U-2 was shot down by an SA-2 missile, explaining that Powers could not have survived such a hit.

None were exported to any of the Soviet Union's client states nor to the Warsaw Pact nations. The remaining Su-9s and later Su-11s were retired during the 1970s. Some were retained as test vehicles or converted to remote-piloted vehicles for use as unmanned aerial vehicles. It, and it's derivative the Su-11, were replaced by the much-superior Su-15 "Flagon" and MiG-25 "Foxbat".

Bobrovka became the Soviet Union's primary storage facility for the Su-9 as it was phased out, and by 1981 at least 243 Su-9 aircraft were observed parked at Bobrovka.

== Variants ==
Development of the Su-9.
T-405
Prototype model of the Su-9.
Su-9
Production variant, about 1,100 built.
Su-9U
Training variant, mounting the standard avionics suite without weapon systems or hardpoints. About 50 units were manufactured.
T-431
A specially modified Su-9 for setting the world record for absolute height in 1962.
Sukhoi Su-11
A upgraded design based on the Su-9. It was slightly lengthened compared to the Su-9. However, it was outmoded by the Sukhoi Su-15, which offered vastly increased range and aerodynamic performance.

== Operators ==
Soviet Union

- Soviet Anti-Air Defense

894th Fighter Aviation Regiment, Ozernoye, Ukraine, 1959-1979.

== Specifications (Su-9) ==
Sukhoi Su-9

Data from OKB Sukhoi : a history of the design bureau and its aircraft

General characteristics

- Crew: 1 (Su-9U 2)
- Length: 16.772 m (55 ft 0 in)
- Wingspan: 8.536 m (28 ft 0 in)
- Height: 4.82 m (15 ft 10 in)
- Wing area: 34 m^{2} (370 sq ft)
- Empty weight: 7,675 kg (16,920 lb)
- Landing weight: 8,658 kg (19,088 lb)
- Gross weight: 10,755 kg (23,711 lb)
- Max takeoff weight: 12,512 kg (27,584 lb)
- Fuel capacity: 3,100 kg (6,834 lb) internal + 2,160 kg (4,762 lb) in external tanks
- Powerplant: 1 × Lyulka AL-7F-1-100 afterburning turbojet engine, 66.67 kN (14,987 lbf) thrust dry, 94.12 kN (21,158 lbf) with afterburner

Performance

- Maximum speed: 2,120 km/h (1,320 mph, 1,140 kn) / Mach 2.0 at 13,000 m (43,000 ft)

2,230 km/h (1,390 mph; 1,200 kn) over 13,000 m (43,000 ft)

- Landing speed: 305–310 km/h (190–193 mph; 165–167 kn)
- Range: 1,350 km (840 mi, 730 nmi) internals
- Ferry range: 1,800 km (1,100 mi, 970 nmi) with external tanks
- Endurance: 1 hour 18 minutes on internal fuel

2 hours with external tanks

- Service ceiling: 20,000 m (66,000 ft)
- g limits: +7
- Wing loading: 316 kg/m^{2} (65 lb/sq ft)
- Thrust/weight: 0.89
- Landing run: 1,150–1,250 m (3,770–4,100 ft) without brake parachute

Armament

- Hardpoints: 2 × under-fuselage hardpoints for drop tanks and 4 × under-wing hardpoints for 500 kg (1,100 lb) of disposable stores , with provisions to carry combinations of:
  - Missiles: 4 × K-5 air-to-air missiles

== See also ==
Related development

- Sukhoi Su-7
- Sukhoi Su-11

Aircraft of comparable role, configuration, and era

- CAC CA-23 – (Australia)
- Convair F-106 Delta Dart – (United States)
- Dassault Mirage III – (France)
- English Electric Lightning – (United Kingdom)
- Lockheed F-104 Starfighter – (United States)
- Mikoyan-Gurevich MiG-21 – (Soviet Union)
- Saab 35 Draken – (Sweden)

Related lists

- List of military aircraft of the Soviet Union and the CIS

== Bibliography ==
- Gordon, Yefim (2004). Sukhoi Interceptors: The Su-9, Su-11 and Su-15 and Other Types. Famous Russian aircraft, Volume 16.Dimitriy Komissarov, transl. Midland Publishing. ISBN 978-1-85780-180-4
