= List of aircraft at the Central Air Force Museum =

This is a list of aircraft at the Central Air Force Museum in Moscow, Russia.

== List of aircraft ==
- Aero L-29 390418.
- Antonov An-8 9340504
- Antonov An-10A CCCP-11213.
- Antonov An-12 8900203
- Antonov An-14.
- Antonov An-22 00340209.
- Antonov An-24 47300903.
- Bartini Beriev VVA-14.
- Bell P-63 Kingcobra.
- Bereznyak-Isayev BI-1 – replica.
- Beriev Be-12 5600302
- Beriev Be-32 CCCP-67209.
- Douglas A-20G Havoc 43-10052.
- Ilyushin DB-3 891311.
- Ilyushin Il-2 301060.
- Ilyushin Il-10M
- Ilyushin Il-12 30218.
- Ilyushin Il-18 181002702.
- Ilyushin Il-28 53005771
- Ilyushin Il-62 CCCP-86670.
- Ilyushin Il-76M CCCP-86047.
- Kamov Ka-25 5910203.
- Lavochkin La-7.
- Lavochkin La-15.
- Lavochkin La-250 1250004
- Lisunov Li-2 18418809
- Lisunov Li-2 CCCP-93914.
- Mikoyan-Gurevich MiG-9
- Mikoyan-Gurevich MiG-17F.
- Mikoyan-Gurevich MiG-19P 62210104.
- Mikoyan-Gurevich MiG-21bis N75021148.
- Mikoyan-Gurevich MiG-21I N010103.
- Mikoyan-Gurevich MiG-21PFS N95210102.
- Mikoyan-Gurevich MiG-23
- Mikoyan-Gurevich MiG-25PD.
- Mikoyan-Gurevich MiG-25R
- Mikoyan-Gurevich MiG-29 0390502020.
- Mikoyan-Gurevich MiG-29 2960710039.
- Mikoyan-Gurevich MiG-29 2960718121.
- Mikoyan-Gurevich MiG-31 N69700102176.
- Mikoyan-Gurevich MiG-31 N69700106125.
- Mikoyan-Gurevich MiG-105
- Mikoyan-Gurevich Ye-152M
- Mil Mi-1.
- Mil Mi-2 528230063.
- Mil Mi-4 1104.
- Mil Mi-6VKP.
- Mil Mi-6 966839018.
- Mil Mi-6.
- Mil Mi-8 00604
- Mil Mi-8T 9743470.
- Mil Mi-10 8680604K.
- Mil Mi-12
- Mil Mi-24A 2201201
- Mil Mi-24V 3532424015897.
- Mil Mi-26 34001212102.
- Myasishchev 3M
- Myasishchev M-17.
- Myasishchev M-50
- North American B-25 Mitchell.
- Piasecki Model 44
- Polikarpov Po-2
- Polikarpov R-5
- PZL M-15 Belphegor.
- Sukhoi Su-2 – replica.
- Sukhoi Su-7B
- Sukhoi Su-9
- Sukhoi Su-11
- Sukhoi Su-15
- Sukhoi Su-17 9024.
- Sukhoi Su-17M3 22301.
- Sukhoi Su-17M4.
- Sukhoi Su-17UM3 63002.
- Sukhoi Su-24 0515304
- Sukhoi Su-25
- Sukhoi Su-27
- Sukhoi T-4
- Tupolev ANT-25 – replica.
- Tupolev Tu-2
- Tupolev Tu-4 280503
- Tupolev Tu-16K 4201004
- Tupolev Tu-16R 1880302.
- Tupolev Tu-22
- Tupolev Tu-22M
- Tupolev Tu-95
- Tupolev Tu-104
- Tupolev Tu-128
- Tupolev Tu-144 CCCP-77106
- Yakovlev Yak-9U 0257
- Yakovlev Yak-11.
- Yakovlev Yak-12R.
- Yakovlev Yak-17
- Yakovlev Yak-18.
- Yakovlev Yak-18.
- Yakovlev Yak-18PM.
- Yakovlev Yak-18T.
- Yakovlev Yak-23
- Yakovlev Yak-24 27203310.
- Yakovlev Yak-25
- Yakovlev Yak-25RV
- Yakovlev Yak-27R 0703
- Yakovlev Yak-28L
- Yakovlev Yak-36
- Yakovlev Yak-38
- Yakovlev Yak-40 CCCP-87490.
- Yakovlev Yak-42 CCCP-42302.
- Yakovlev Yak-50.
- Yakovlev Yak-52 780102.
- Yakovlev Yak-141.
