= List of NATO reporting names for fighter aircraft =

The Five Eyes Air Force Interoperability Council (AFIC) assigns codenames for fighters and other military aircraft originating in, or operated by, the air forces of the former Warsaw Pact, including Russia, and the People's Republic of China.

When the system began the names were assigned by the Air Standardization Coordinating Committee (ASCC), made up of the English-speaking allies of the Second World War, the United States, United Kingdom, Canada and two non-NATO countries, Australia and New Zealand. The ASCC names were adopted by the U.S. Department of Defense and then NATO. They have also become known as "NATO reporting names". The ASCC became the Five Eyes Air Force Interoperability Council and no longer has responsibility for generating reporting names.

| NATO reporting name | Common name |
|---|---|
| Faceplate | Mikoyan-Gurevich Ye-2 |
| Fagin | Chengdu J-20 |
| Fagot | Mikoyan-Gurevich MiG-15 |
| Fang | Lavochkin La-11 |
| Fantail | Lavochkin La-15 |
| Fantan | Nanchang Q-5/A-5 |
| Fargo | Mikoyan-Gurevich MiG-9 |
| Farmer | Shenyang J-6 and Mikoyan-Gurevich MiG-19 |
| Feather | Yakovlev Yak-15/Yak-17 |
| Felon | Sukhoi Su-57 |
| Fencer | Sukhoi Su-24 |
| Fiddler | Tupolev Tu-28/Tu-128 |
| Fin | Lavochkin La-7 |
| Finback | Shenyang J-8 |
| Firebar | Yakovlev Yak-28P |
| Firebird | Chengdu J-10 |
| Firkin | Sukhoi Su-47 |
| Fishbed | Mikoyan-Gurevich MiG-21 |
| Fishcan | Chengdu J-7 |
| Fishpot | Sukhoi Su-9 and Su-11 |
| Fitter | Sukhoi Su-7 and Su-17/Su-20/Su-22 |
| Flagon | Sukhoi Su-15 |
| Flanker | Sukhoi Su-27/Shenyang J-11 family |
| Flashlight | Yakovlev Yak-25 and Yakovlev Yak-27 |
| Flatpack/Foxglove | MiG MFI project 1.44/1.42 |
| Flipper | Mikoyan-Gurevich Ye-150 |
| Flogger | Mikoyan-Gurevich MiG-23 and MiG-27 |
| Flora | Yakovlev Yak-23 |
| Flounder | Xian JH-7 |
| Forger | Yakovlev Yak-38 |
| Foxbat | Mikoyan-Gurevich MiG-25 |
| Foxhound | Mikoyan MiG-31 |
| Frank | Yakovlev Yak-9 |
| Fred | Bell P-63 Kingcobra |
| Freehand | Yakovlev Yak-36 |
| Freestyle | Yakovlev Yak-41/Yak-141 |
| Fresco | Mikoyan-Gurevich MiG-17 and Shenyang J-5 |
| Fritz | Lavochkin La-9 |
| Frogfoot | Sukhoi Su-25 |
| Fulcrum | Mikoyan MiG-29 family |
| Fullback | Sukhoi Su-32/Su-34 |

== See also ==
- NATO reporting name
