= Yakovlev Yak-26 =

Soviet Air Force jet aircraft prototype

Yak-26
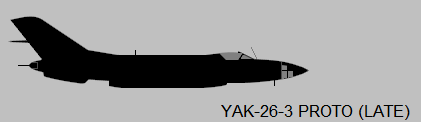

General information
- Type: Bomber
- Manufacturer: Yakovlev
- Primary user: Soviet Air Forces
- Number built: 10

History
- Developed from: Yakovlev Yak-25

The Yakovlev Yak-26 (NATO reporting name "Flashlight-B"), OKB designation Yak-123, was a Soviet tactical supersonic bomber aircraft flown at the Tushino air show on 24 June 1956. The model did not enter service.

== Design and development ==
The Yak-123-1 prototype was developed from the subsonic Yak-25, and in parallel with the Yak-27 aircraft family, with the main goal of operating at supersonic speed. Although the Yak-123 kept the Yak-25's layout, it had a more streamlined and longer fuselage with a glazed nose for a navigator-bombardier, replacing the Yak-25's radome. The engines were upgraded to the much more powerful RD-9AK afterburning turbojets and the wings modified. The Nudelman N-37 cannon was replaced with two NR-23 23 mm guns. The next prototype, designated Yak-26-3, had a tail barbette with two more such guns, but it was removed altogether after testing. An internal weapons bay was added for 1,000 kg (2,200 lb) of bombs, including the nuclear RDS-4 Tatyana. Additional bombs could be carried on underwing pylons. Engines were upgraded to RD-9F.

Although these designs showed potential for a supersonic bomber, they did not feature a radar, limiting their usefulness, and suffered from insufficient stability at high velocities, being prone to aileron reversals. This led to a refinement of the design, resulting in the preproduction-series Yak-26.

Although flown at the Tushino air show on 24 June 1956, only ten were produced, and the type did not enter service.

== Operators ==
Soviet Union

- Soviet Air Force

== Specifications (Yak-26) ==
Data from

General characteristics

- Crew: 2
- Length: 17.16 m (56 ft 4 in)
- Wingspan: 10.96 m (35 ft 11 in)
- Wing area: 29 m^{2} (310 sq ft)
- Gross weight: 11,200 kg (24,692 lb)
- Powerplant: 2 × Tumansky RD-9F turbojet engines, 19.6 kN (4,400 lbf) thrust each

Performance

- Maximum speed: 1,200 km/h (750 mph, 650 kn)
- Range: 2,200 km (1,400 mi, 1,200 nmi)
- Service ceiling: 16,000 m (52,000 ft)
- Wing loading: 386 kg/m^{2} (79 lb/sq ft)
- Thrust/weight: 0.36

Armament

- 4 x 23 mm Nudelman NR-23 cannon with 1,200 rounds
- Bombs in internal bay
- Underwing hardpoints
- Tail barbette (limited to Yak-26-3 prototype)

== See also ==
Related development

- Yakovlev Yak-25
- Yakovlev Yak-27
- Yakovlev Yak-28
