= Tumansky RD-9 =

Turbojet aircraft engine

RD-9
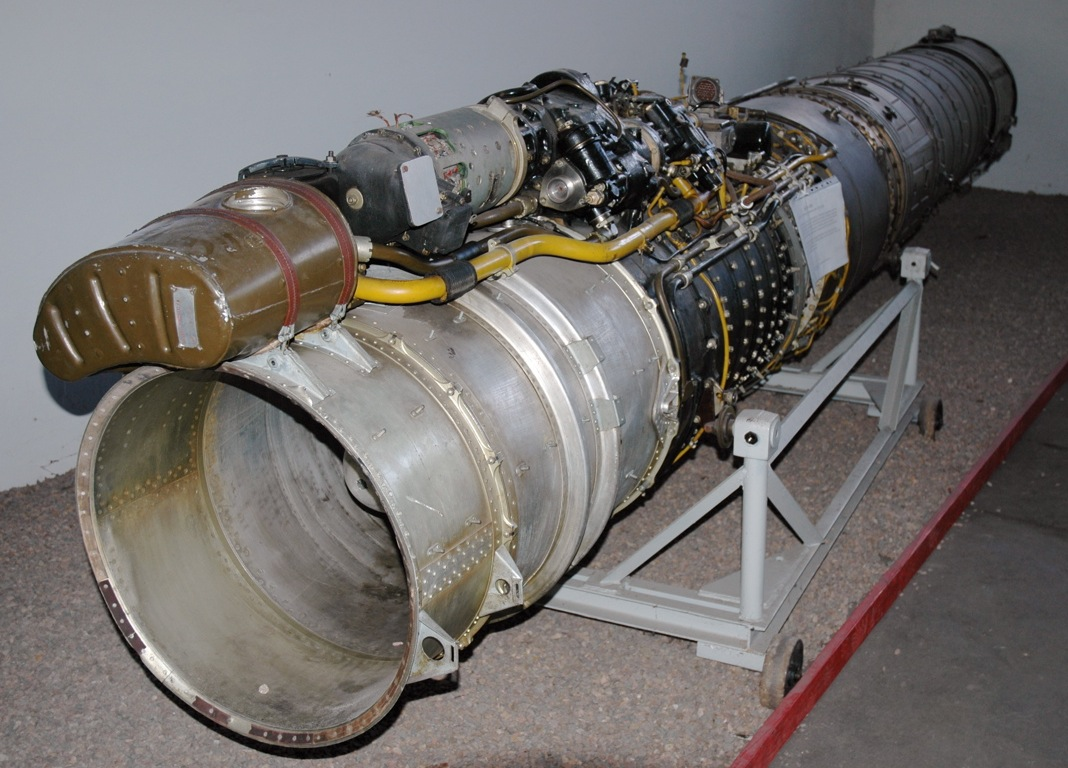
- Preserved Tumansky RD-9B turbojet engine
- Type: Turbojet
- Manufacturer: Tumansky
- First run: 1953
- Major applications: Yak-25; MiG-19

The Tumansky RD-9 (initially designated Mikulin AM-5) was an early Soviet turbojet engine, one of the first not based on pre-existing German or British designs. The AM-5, developed by scaling down the AM-3, was available in 1952 and completed testing in 1953; it produced 25.5 kN (5,700 lb_{f}) thrust without afterburner. The AM-5 engine is notable for making possible the first mass-produced supersonic interceptors such as the MiG-19, and the first Soviet all-weather area interceptor, the Yak-25. When Sergei Tumansky replaced Alexander Mikulin as the OKB-24's chief designer in 1956, the engine was renamed RD-9. The engine was later built under license in China as the WP-6.

== Variants and applications ==
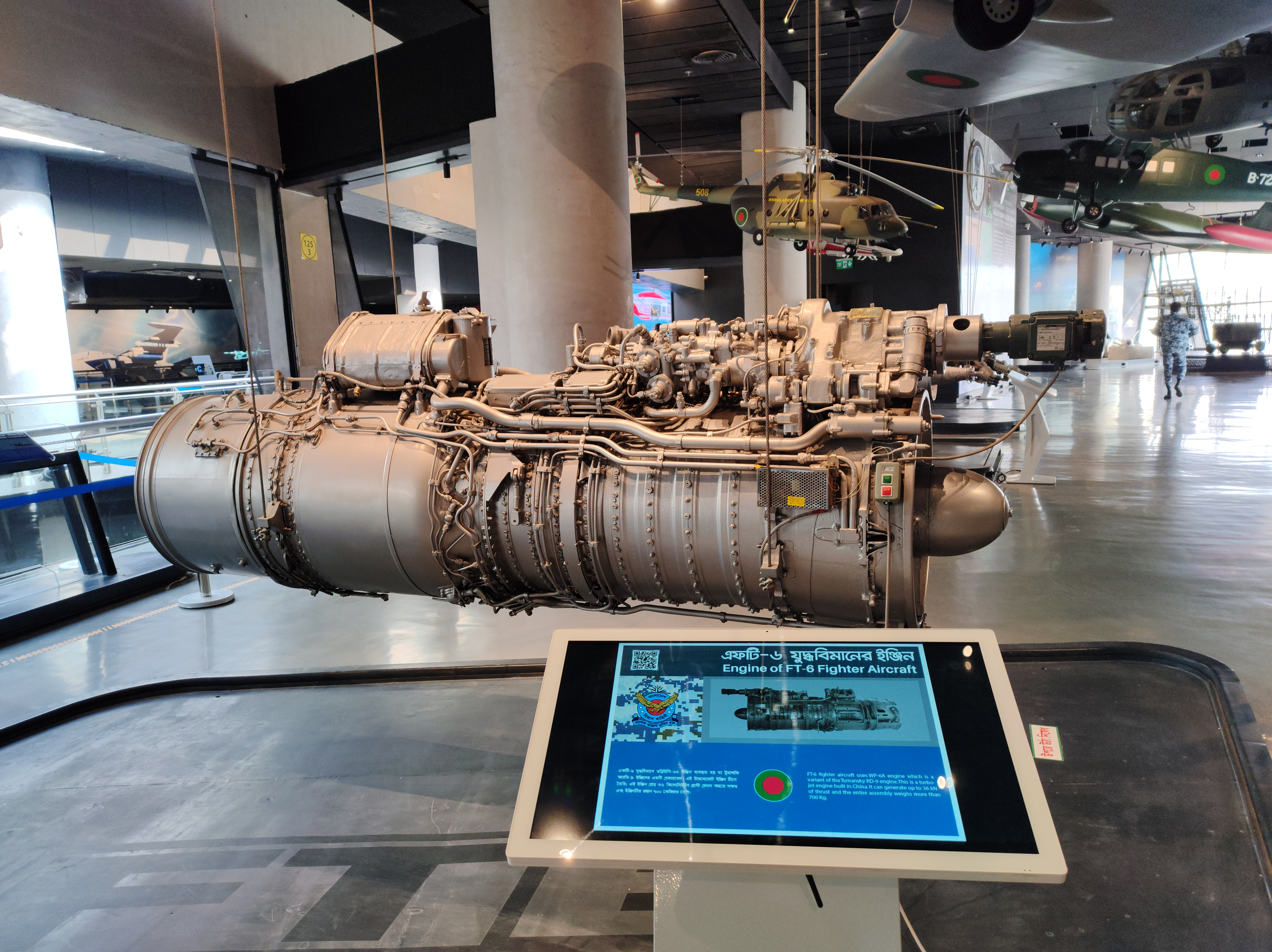
A BAF FT-6's Wopen WP-6A turbojet engines on display at Bangabandhu Military Museum, Bangladesh

RD-9A
RD-9B
Used in the East German civilian jetliner project Baade 152 in 1958 and 1959, replaced when Pirna 014 engines became available.
RD-9AK
Non-afterburning versions for the Yak-25 and Yak-26.
RD-9AF-300
Afterburning version for the Yak-27 and Yak-28.
RD-9AF2-300
Afterburning version for the Yak-27 and Yak-28.
RD-9B
Afterburning version for the early variants of MiG-19.
RD-9BK
Version for Lavochkin La-17M.
RD-9BF-811
Afterburning version for the later variants of MiG-19.
RD-9V
Afterburning version used in the Ilyushin Il-40P.
WP-6
Chinese built version for the Shenyang J-6.
WP-6A
a Chinese upgraded version for the Nanchang Q-5 and J-6C.
WP-6Z
further developed for the cancelled Nanchang J-12
NK-TJ
(Note: designation is just a placeholder) North Korean version built for MiG-19 and Shenyang J-6

== Specifications (RD-9BF-811) ==
Data from

==== General characteristics ====
- Type: Afterburning turbojet
- Length: 5,560 mm (219 in)
- Diameter: 668 mm (26 in)
- Dry weight: 725 kg (1,600 lb)

==== Components ====
- Compressor: Single-spool 9-stage Axial compressor
- Turbine: axial flow

==== Performance ====
- Maximum thrust: 3,000 kgf (6,600 lbf, 29 kN) military power, 3,750 kgf (8,300 lbf, 37 kN) with afterburner
- Overall pressure ratio: 7.14
- Turbine inlet temperature: 860 °C
- Specific fuel consumption: 0.96 lb/(lbf⋅h) or 27 g/(kN⋅s) military power / 1.6 lb/(lbf⋅h) or 45 g/(kN⋅s) afterburner
- Thrust-to-weight ratio: 5.2

== See also ==
Comparable engines

- Allison J35
- General Electric J47

Related lists

- List of aircraft engines

== See also ==
- Soyuz Scientific Production Association
