= Yakovlev Yak-25 =

Soviet Air Force jet aircraft

Yak-25
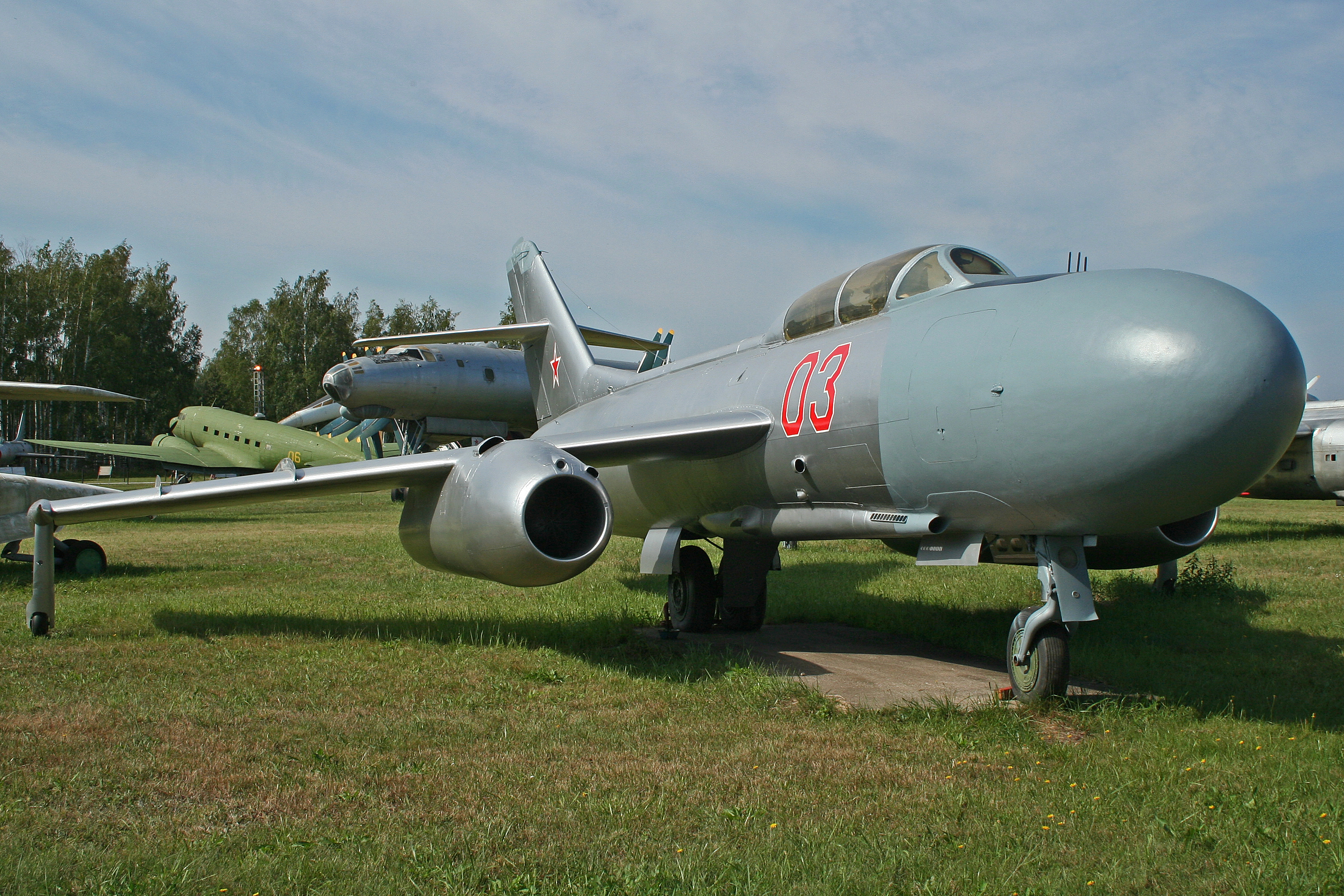
- Yak-25 at Monino Aviation Museum

General information
- Type: Interceptor fighter and reconnaissance aircraft
- Manufacturer: Yakovlev
- Primary users: Soviet Air Force Soviet Air Defence Forces
- Number built: 483 + 155

History
- Introduction date: 1955
- First flight: 19 June 1952
- Retired: 1967 (Yak-25M), 1974 (Yak-25RV)

The Yakovlev Yak-25 (NATO designation Flashlight-A/Mandrake) is a swept wing, turbojet-powered interceptor and reconnaissance aircraft built by Yakovlev and used by the Soviet Union.

== Design and development ==
The Yak-25 originated from a need for long-range interceptor aircraft to protect the USSR's northern and eastern territory. The specification for a two-seat, twin-engine jet fighter and a related reconnaissance aircraft was issued by Joseph Stalin on 6 August 1951.

=== Yak-120 ===
Yakovlev began developing a two-seat, twin-engine patrol interceptor, designated the Yak-120 by the design bureau, in 1951. It received official authorization by a directive of the Council of Ministers on 10 August of that year. In a break from previous Yakovlev designs, the Yak-120's thin, mid-set wings were swept back at a 45 degree angle with large two-section flaps. To provide more directional stability, a ventral fin was attached below the swept cruciform tail. The aircraft was powered by two Mikulin AM-5 turbojets, mounted in nacelles that were attached directly to the undersurface of the wing.

The design maximized fuel capacity to provide greater endurance, resulting in the usage of a bicycle undercarriage with a single-wheel nose unit and a two-wheel main unit, augmented by outrigger struts mounted under the wingtips. The Yak-120 was configured to carry a conformal drop tank on the centerline of the fuselage to provide additional endurance.

The aircraft included an RP-6 Sokol radar in its nose, with the radar antenna dish enclosed by a bullet-shaped glass fiber radome. The Sokol could detect four engine bombers at 25 km and fighters at 16 km distance. It carried two crewmen, a pilot and a radar intercept operator, seated in tandem below a shared aft-sliding canopy. The radar intercept operator handled target searching and assisted the pilot in guiding the aircraft towards the target in unfavorable weather, and was able to fly the aircraft when required due to the aircraft's dual controls, decreasing pilot fatigue on lengthy missions. The aircraft's fixed windshield included a 105-millimeter (4.1 in)-thick bulletproof glass panel, while the rest of the aircraft was protected by 10-millimeter (0.39 in) all-round armor plates.

The aircraft was armed with two 37 mm NL-37L cannon, mounted low on the sides of the center fuselage. A supply of 50 rounds per gun was typically carried, although the ammunition boxes could contain twice as much. Under the wings was provision for two 212-millimeter (8.3 in) ARS-212 unguided rockets. The aircraft's avionics allowed it to navigate and intercept its targets in all weather conditions at altitudes up to its service ceiling. As well as the radar, the aircraft was equipped with an SRO-1 IFF transponder, an RSIU-3 Klyon VHF radio, and an AP-28 autopilot. To set up an automatic landing approach in bad weather, the Yak included a Materik (Russian for continent) Instrument landing system. The Pozitron-1 system completed the aircraft's avionics systems, and was likely a command link system.

The aircraft's wings, tail unit, and air intakes were equipped with hot air de-icing, while the foreign object damage protection screens and intake center-bodies of the engines were de-iced electrically, enabling the Yak to remain at colder high altitudes for longer times and to operate in regions with a cold climate. Despite its complex and heavy avionics, the aircraft had a lightweight airframe for a twin-engined fighter, due to a design that reduced structural weight to the minimum. Two prototypes and a static test mockup were built by Yakovlev. The first prototype flew on 19 June 1952, piloted by Yakovlev test pilot Valentin Volkov. Manufacturer testing continued until November.

The Yak-120 exceeded the Air Force specific operational requirements in all aspects except for speed and range. Its 3-hour and 45 minute endurance without a drop tank (4 hours and 15 minutes with tank) and 2,800 km range on internal fuel at 12,000 m altitude allowed it to fly long-range patrols. Being smaller and lighter, it surpassed the performance of the competing Lavochkin La-200B. However, the aircraft could not be submitted for state acceptance trials due to delays in the development of the RP-6 radar. As a result, the RP-1 Izumrood radar was fitted as a temporary substitute in early December. The Yak-120 was tested at the Scientific Research Institute of the Air Force (NII VVS) with the RP-1 between May and June 1953. With mostly positive results, the aircraft was authorized for production with the service designation Yak-25. The test results from the NII VVS were approved as specifications for the Yak-25 by a Council of Ministers directive on 8 September.

=== Production and Yak-25M ===
The Yak-25s were built at Factory No. 292 in Saratov, with the first aircraft completed in September 1954. Due to slight modifications, the radar of these aircraft was known as the RP-1D. However, very few aircraft were built to the original standards, due to the fact that the RP-6 had been fully developed by the end of 1953. In April 1954, a Yak-120 prototype with the RP-6 passed its state acceptance trials, and on 13 May the Council of Ministers approved the production of the modified version with the designation Yak-25M. In addition to the radar, this version also incorporated several changes – the AM-5A Srs 1 turbojets were replaced with RD-5A (AM-5A) Srs 2 engines with the same rating, the wheelbase was increased by moving the nose gear unit 33 cm forward to improve directional stability during takeoff and landing, and the cannons were fitted with muzzle brakes. 406 Yak-25Ms were built at the Saratov factory, with deliveries beginning in January 1955. RAF RPF ELINT flights from October 1956 indicated that the Yak-25M had entered service, but that height-finding by ground-based radars was poor and so interception was ineffective above 35,000 feet.

=== Further Yak-120 development ===
In September 1953, after the first stage of the Yak-120's state acceptance trials concluded, the second Yak-120 prototype was re-engined with the new Mikulin AM-9A turbojet, an improved version of the AM-5. Rocket pods for 57-millimeter (2.2 in) ARS-57 Skvorets folding-fin aircraft rockets were added, intended for use against enemy bomber formations. A modified RP-6 known as the Sokol-M was also to be added, and what was designated the Yak-120M was to begin its state acceptance trials in September 1954. Due to delays occasioned by the late delivery of the engines and lack of radar, the aircraft was not completed until the end of 1954, and was instead equipped with a standard RP-6. In November, the first stage of the state acceptance trials (with the standard RP-6 and no FFARs) was postponed until January 1955, but by March of that year the aircraft was planned to be ready for the second stage, with the Sokol-M and FFARs. The same directive that changed the schedule also specified that the 190-millimeter (7.5 in) TRS-190 rocket be used as alternate armament. To allow for the increased weight of the rockets, lighter 23-millimeter (0.91 in) Nudelman-Rikhter NR-23 cannons replaced the N-37Ls.

The first stage of the state acceptance trials of the Yak-120M were completed on schedule in January 1955; the second stage began in March and concluded in late April. However, the aircraft's performance was slightly short of the operational requirements, and the failure to complete the Sokol-M, coupled with a need for supersonic interceptors, forced abandonment of the Yak-120M. The prototype was used as a testbed for RD-9F engines under the designation Yak-120MF.

In 1955 and 1956 several Yak-25Ms were refitted as testbeds for air-to-air missile armament.

=== Yak-125, Yak-25R, and Yak-25MR ===
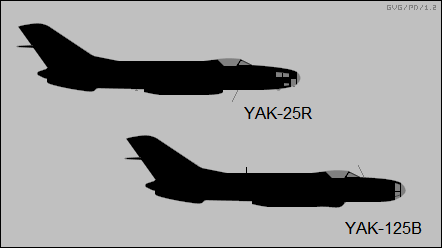
Yakovlev Yak-25R and Yak-125B

A two-seat tactical reconnaissance aircraft prototype, the Yak-125, was developed in tandem with the Yak-120. In order to make room for two AKAFU automatic tilting camera mounts installed next to each other, the radar was removed and the nose extended slightly. The mounts carried AFA-33/100M, AFA-33/75M, or AFA-33/50M vertical photographic cameras. A flexible oblique camera mount with an AFA-33/75M or AFA-22/50M camera was positioned forward in order to cover the port and starboard areas. The ports were protected by hinged doors during take-off and landing; ports and cameras were controlled by the reconnaissance systems operator in the rear cockpit. The twin cannon of the Yak-120 were replaced by a single NR-23 with 80 rounds, positioned on the starboard side of the fuselage. The Yak-125's internal fuel capacity was increased to 3,925 litres (863 imp gal).

The prototype was finished in August 1952, making its first flight on 26 August, with Volkov at its controls. It completed manufacturer flight tests in October 1953, and conducted state acceptance trials between December 1953 and February 1954. The Yak-125 outperformed the production Ilyushin Il-28R and Mikoyan-Gurevich MiG-15bisR, but the state commission recommended modifications and directed the construction of a small pre-production batch for service trials due to pilot and reconnaissance systems operator visibility limitations caused by the longer nose in the case of the former and the small ventral window for the latter.

As a result of the state commission's comments, the Yak-125's forward fuselage was redesigned. The reconnaissance systems operator was moved to a compartment in the nose, in which oblique and vertical cameras were installed in front of the seat. Cameras were also located in the center fuselage, although the remainder of the aircraft was unchanged from the Yak-125. The modified aircraft was designated the Yak-25R. By a Council of Ministers directive of 10 March 1955, which was followed on the next day by an order of the Ministry of Aircraft Production, Yakovlev and Factory No. 292 in Saratov were tasked with building ten pre-production aircraft. The aircraft did not enter production, however, due to its obsolescence, Yakovlev's later supersonic reconnaissance aircraft, which was ready for testing, and the introduction of the Il-28R as the main reconnaissance aircraft of the Soviet Air Forces.

Yakovlev was tasked by a Council of Ministers Directive of 18 September 1954 and a Ministry of Aircraft Production order issued three days later with developing a fast maritime reconnaissance version of the Yak-25, designated the Yak-25MR. The aircraft was to fill a requirement for a maritime reconnaissance aircraft from Soviet Naval Aviation, and was required to match or exceed Yak-25 performance, commencing State acceptance trials in February 1955.

=== Yak-125B ===
Yakovlev was tasked with developing a high-speed nuclear bomber using the basic Yak-125 design, the Yak-125B, by a special joint directive of the Central Committee of the Communist Party and the Council of Ministers. The Yak-125B was intended to break through enemy air defenses and conduct a nuclear strike against strategic targets in the enemy rear. It had a crew of two; the navigator, who doubled as the bombardier, was seated in a compartment in the extreme nose. The nuclear bomb was housed in a bomb bay near the aircraft's center of gravity, which resulted in the nose unit of the undercarriage receiving twin wheels of similar size to the main unit, which was moved just aft of the bomb bay. This arrangement was later used on Yakovlev tactical bombers, including the Yak-28. Yak-125B was the first Yakovlev aircraft to include a 360-degree ground mapping and bomb-aiming radar, the RMM-2 Rubidiy, located in a radome directly below the cockpit. The aircraft entered flight testing in 1955, and the production version was planned to be designated the Yak-25B. However, it never entered production due to obsolescence and Yakovlev's testing of a superior supersonic nuclear bomber, the Yak-26.

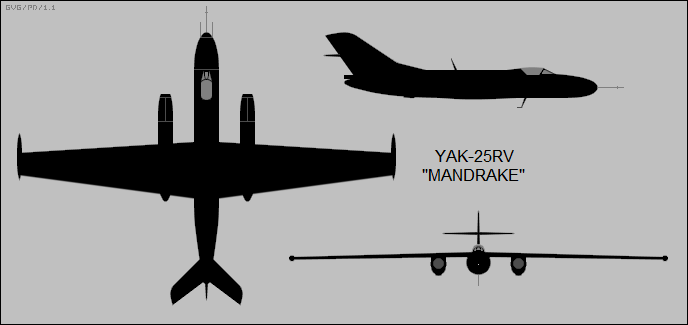
Yak-25RV

=== Yak-25RV ===
A reconnaissance derivative of the Yak-25, the Yak-25RV (Razvedchick Vysotnyj, "high-altitude reconnaissance"), was developed in 1959 (NATO codename 'Mandrake'). It had a completely new, long-span straight wing of 23.4 meters (more than twice that of the Yak-25M interceptor) with a total area of 55 square meters. Camera and sensor packs were added in the fuselage. Some versions may have retained one cannon.

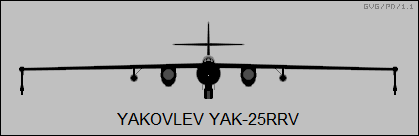
Yak-25RRV

Despite its low wing loading, the 'Mandrake's' altitude performance was marginal at best, with considerable engine problems at high altitudes, excessive vibration, and primitive equipment that imposed high workloads for the crews. The Soviet Air Force nevertheless kept the Yak-25RV in service until 1974. A few were used in the late 1970s for monitoring of radioactive contamination, with specialized sensors; these were designated Yak-25RRV. Efforts in 1971 to develop the 'Mandrake' as a high-altitude interceptor (Yak-25PA) proved unsuccessful.

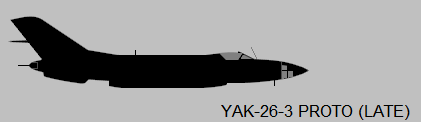
Yakovlev Yak-26

In 1961 a series of lightened 'Mandrakes' were produced as high-altitude target drones. The Yak-25RV-I was used as a manned target for unarmed (no live fire) interception practice, the Yak-25RV-II as a remote-piloted drone.

=== Yak-26 ===
The derivative Yak-26 was developed as a bomber, but only nine were built.

== Operational history ==
The Yak-25 was first displayed at Tushino Airfield in July 1955, and received the NATO reporting name Flashlight, which was subsequently changed to Flashlight-A when the Yak-26 and Yak-27 were reported. They started to equip air defence units from 1955. They were considered easy to fly and popular among the crews. Engine breakdowns were quite common, mostly due to the low engine position when on the ground, which demanded clean airfields, but thanks to twin-engine arrangement, few such failures were fatal.

Due to its twin engines and radar intercept operator, pilots gained more confidence on long missions in the remote northern and eastern areas of the Soviet Union.

In 1955, 108 pilots and 95 ground crewmen finished conversion training on the Yak-25M at the Savasleyka PVO Training and Methodical Center. As it was intended for low-altitude flying, the Yak-25's service ceiling was too low to intercept the American RB-47 Stratojet, which often flew reconnaissance missions over Soviet territory.

Their withdrawal started in 1963. The last Yak-25 interceptors were retired by 1967; the 'Mandrake' reconnaissance version soldiered on in various roles through the late 1970s. Like many other PVO interceptors of the Cold War era, the Yak-25M was not exported to the Warsaw Pact or other nations.

== Variants ==
Yak-25
First production version equipped with the RP-1D "Izumrud" radar. 67 aircraft built.

Yak-25B
Projected production version of Yak-125 tactical nuclear bomber prototype.

Yak-25M
Basic production version with some minor improvements, upgraded AM-5A engines and new RP-6 "Sokol" radar. 406 aircraft built.

Yak-25MG
Some Yak-25M aircraft refitted with the 'Gorizont-1' system to allow them to be flown (via autopilot) by ground stations for ground control interception missions. According to aviation historian Yefim Gordon, this designation was used for Yak-25Ms upgraded to the newer Granat radar later in their careers.

Yak-25RV NATO reporting name Mandrake
(Razvedchick Vysotnyj, "high-altitude reconnaissance")High-altitude reconnaissance version with new wing and camera and sensor packs in the fuselage. 155 aircraft built.

Yak-25RR
(Radiatsionyy Razvedchik - radiation reconnaissance aircraft) Yak-25RV equipped with specialized sensors for monitoring radioactive contamination.

Yak-25RRV
(Rahdiotekhnicheskiy Razvedchik Vysotnyy - high altitude electronic intelligence aircraft) Yak-25RV equipped with specialized SIGINT sensors.

Yak-25RV-I
Manned target version for unarmed (no live fire) interception practice.

Yak-25RV-II
Remote-piloted drone for armed (live fire) interception practice.

Yak-25PA
(perekhvahtchik aerostahtov - balloon interceptor) Balloon interceptor version of the Yak-25RV, probably armed with a single cannon; one built / converted.

=== Yak-25 family prototypes and projects ===
Yak-2AM-11
Reconnaissance and tactical reconnaissance projects powered by 2 x Mikulin AM-11(Tumansky R-11), cancelled as production of Tumansky R-11 allocated to MiG-21.

Yak-13
immediate predecessor of Yak-120, not built (re-use of designation from light tourer of 1946).

Yak-25K
Yak-25M with removed cannon, equipped Yak-25K-5 weapon system consisting of the "Izumrud" radar and four RS-1U (NATO AA-1 "Alkali") beam-riding missiles on the wings inboard of the engine pods. Small number built.

Yak-25K-7L
Yak-25K testbed for K-7L missiles. This version did not enter service and the aircraft version was abandoned.

Yak-25K-75
Yak-25M testbed for K-75 missiles. This weapon did not enter service and the aircraft version was abandoned.

Yak-25K-8 (Yak-25S K-8)
Two Yak-25K converted to Yak-25K-8 weapons system testbeds with two K-8 (NATO AA-3 'Anab') missiles. Two Yak-25M aircraft (Yak-25S K-8) were modified for carriage trials of the K-8 missile. Terminated in favor of the upcoming Yak-28P.

Yak-25L (letayuschchaya laboritoriya - flying laboratory)
Ejection seat testbed.

Yak-25MR (morskoy razvedchik - maritime reconnaissance aircraft)
Maritime reconnaissance aircraft prototype.

Yak-25MSh
Prototype of Radio controlled target drone, no production but many were converted to drones after service, but did not have MSh designation.

Yak-25R
Reconnaissance version with glazed nose for second crewman (navigator) and two cameras. Aircraft armed with 23mm cannon, 10 pre-production aircraft built.

Yak-26
Tactical nuclear bomber development, 9 aircraft built.

Yak-120M
Yak-120 re-engined with Mikulin AM-9A (AM-5 with 0stage added to compressor, can-annular combustion chamber and afterburning and improvements to armament and avionics.

Yak-120MF
Yak-120M converted to RD-9F engine testbed.

Yak-122
Tactical reconnaissance aircraft prototype evolved from the Yak-25 and the Yak2AM-11 project, powered by two RD-9F turbojets. This aircraft was converted into the Yak-27R tactical reconnaissance prototype.

Yak-123
prototype for Yak-26 tactical nuclear bomber.

Yak-125B
OKB designation for Yak-25B tactical nuclear strike aircraft prototype, carrying 1 x (spetspodveska - special slung load)

Yak-SM-6
Two production Yak-25s modified for testing K-6 AAMs, missile cancelled used for other test tasks.

== Operators ==
Soviet Union

- Soviet Air Force
- Soviet Anti-Air Defense

== Specifications (Yak-25) ==
Yakovlev Yak-25 3-view drawing

Data from Soviet Air Defence Aviation 1945–1991.

General characteristics

- Crew: 2, pilot and radar intercept operator
- Length: 15.665 m (51 ft 4.87 in)
- Wingspan: 10.964 m (35 ft 11.65625 in)
- Wing area: 28.95 m^{2} (311.62 sq ft)
- Empty weight: 6,210 kg (13,690 lb)
- Gross weight: 9,220 kg (20,326 lb)
- Powerplant: 2 × Mikulin AM-5 (RD-5A) turbojets , 19.6 kN (4,410 lbf) thrust each

Performance

- Maximum speed: 1,090 km/h (677 mph, 588 kn)
- Range: 2,700 km (1,677 mi, 1,457 nmi)
- Service ceiling: 12,000 m (39,370 ft)
- Rate of climb: 44 m/s (8,660 ft/min)

Armament

- Guns: 2× 37 mm Nudelman NL-37 cannon (50 rounds per gun, 100 rounds total)

== See also ==
Related development

- Yakovlev Yak-26
- Yakovlev Yak-27
- Yakovlev Yak-28

Aircraft of comparable role, configuration, and era

- Avro Canada CF-100 Canuck
- de Havilland Sea Venom
- de Havilland Sea Vixen
- Douglas F3D Skyknight
- Gloster Javelin
- Lavochkin La-200
- Lockheed F-94 Starfire
- Northrop F-89 Scorpion
- Sud Aviation Vautour

Related lists

- List of fighter aircraft
- List of military aircraft of the Soviet Union and the CIS
