= Yakovlev Yak-27 =

Soviet Air Force jet aircraft

Yak-27
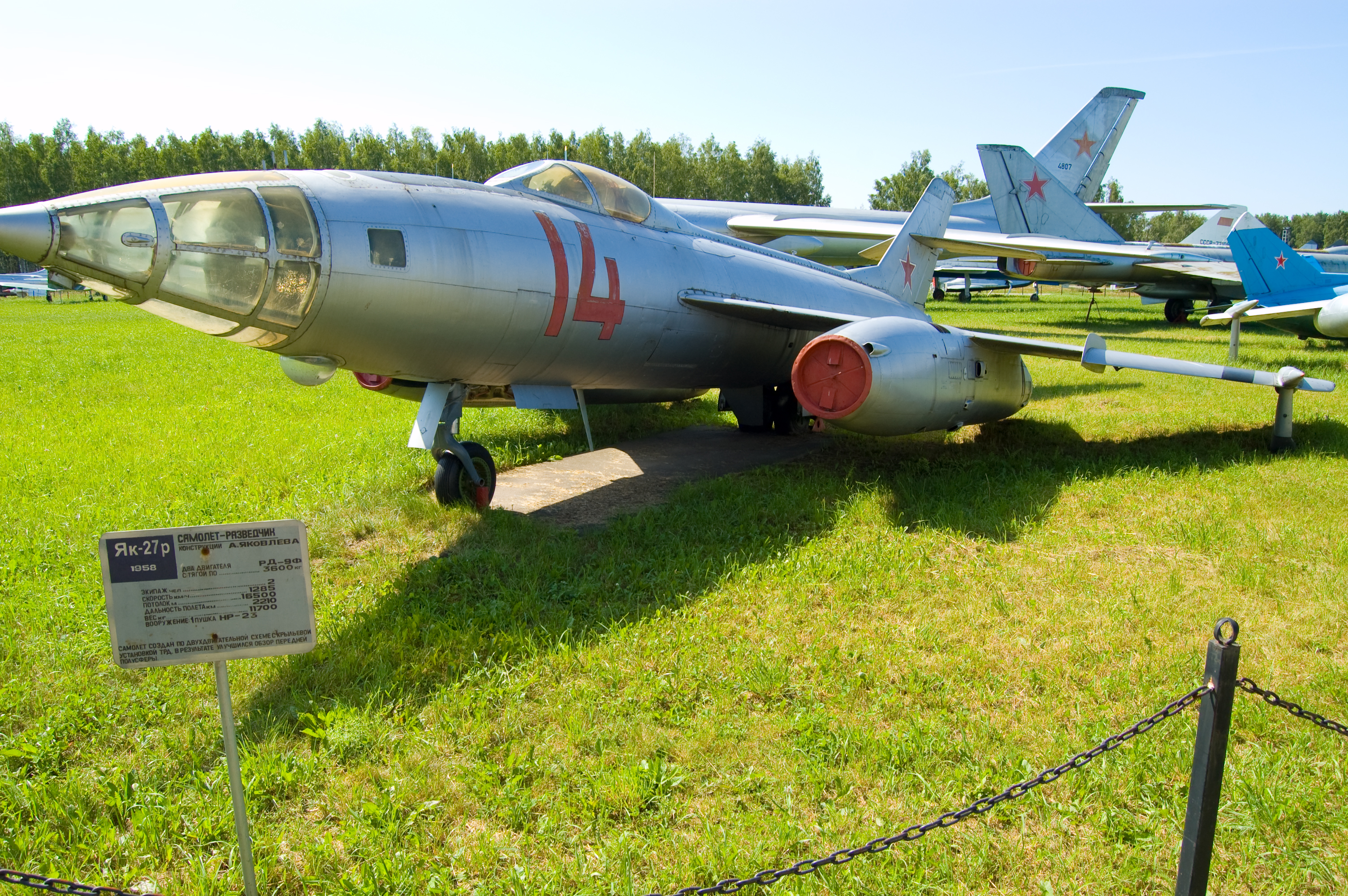
- Yak-27R at the Central Air Force Museum, Monino

General information
- Type: Reconnaissance aircraft
- Manufacturer: Yakovlev
- Primary user: Soviet Air Force
- Number built: Prototypes + 165 serial built

History
- Manufactured: 1958–1962
- Introduction date: 1960
- Retired: Late 1970s (Soviet Union)
- Developed from: Yakovlev Yak-25

The Yakovlev Yak-27 (NATO reporting name "Flashlight-C") is a family of Soviet supersonic aircraft developed in 1958 from the Yak-121 prototype. The most built variant was the tactical reconnaissance Yak-27R (NATO reporting name originally "Flashlight-D" then "Mangrove").

== Design and development ==
The Yak-121 prototype was developed as a successor to the Yak-25 family and it became the base for the Yak-27 family of supersonic interceptor and tactical reconnaissance aircraft. The Yak-27 and Yak-27K interceptors, armed with guns and K-8 missiles respectively, reached or exceeded their requirements, but were overtaken in performance by the Sukhoi Su-9, and so production was not authorized. A high-altitude interceptor version, the Yak-27V, was converted from the Yak-121 prototype by fitting a 1,300 kg•f (2,866 lb•f) Dushkin S-155 rocket booster in the rear fuselage, and Tumansky RD-9AKYe afterburning turbojets. Although performance was very good, reaching the height of 23,000 m (75,400 ft) during trials, development was halted due to maintenance problems of the Dushkin S-155 rocket engine.

The dedicated high-altitude photo-reconnaissance variant of the Yak-27 interceptor was named Yak-27R (NATO designation "Mangrove"). The radome and radar were replaced with a glazed nose for an observer/navigator, two cameras were added, and the Nudelman-Rikhter NR-23 cannon was deleted from the port-board. It had a longer wing with a span of 11.82 m (38 ft 9 in), with two Tumansky RD-9AF turbojet engines and a top speed of about 1,285 km/h (798 mph) at high altitude. It had a service ceiling of 16,500 m (54,000 ft) and a range of 2,380 km (1,480 mi) with two wing tanks. About 180 aircraft were produced in Plant No.292 in Saratov.

== Operational history ==
The Yak-27R entered service with the Soviet Air Force in 1960 and was intended to replace the subsonic Ilyushin Il-28 reconnaissance aircraft. However, despite the greater speed and altitude ceiling, it had less range. The Yak-27R also had some operational limitations and was flown at supersonic speed only by the most experienced pilots. The low position of the engines made them prone to foreign object ingestion at unimproved forward-base runways. With the increasing coverage of anti-aircraft missiles over Europe, the high-altitude Yak-27R was often more limited than the Il-28. The Yak-27R was withdrawn from operational service in the early 1970s, and was replaced by the Yak-28R and the MiG-25R.

== Variants ==
Yak-121
Prototype of Yak-27 family.

Yak-27
Supersonic interceptor derived from Yak-121, armed with two 30 mm cannons, did not enter service.

Yak-27F
Conversion of one Yak-27R with downward pointing TV cameras in the rear fuselage.

Yak-27K (Yak-27K-8)
Interceptor version of Yak-27, armed with two K-8 missiles, did not enter service.

Yak-27R
Tactical reconnaissance version of Yak-27, the most built variant with about 180 built.

Yak-27LSh, (lyzhnoye shasee - ski undercarriage)
Conversion of a Yak-27R, with a single retractable ski under the centre fuselage and enlarged nosewheels.

Yak-27RN
Reconnaissance version of Yak-27 underwent flight testing, nothing further known.

Yak-27V
High-altitude interceptor, one prototype only, converted from the Yak-121. Had auxiliary rocket engine.

== Operators ==
Soviet Union

- Soviet Air Force
  - 11th Independent Vitebskiy Reconnaissance Regiment (1966–70, Neu-Welzow, East Germany)
  - 47th Independent Guards Reconnaissance Regiment (received first Yak-27R in May 1959. Last aircraft were retired in mid-1970s and replaced by MiG-25RBs; based at Shatalovo, Moscow Military District)
  - 48th Independent Guards Nizhegorodsky Reconnaissance Regiment (1958–72, Kolomiya, western Ukraine)
  - 98th Independent Guards Vislenskiy Reconnaissance Regiment (? 1961-73, Monchegorsk, Kola Peninsula)
  - 164th Independent Guards Kerchensky Independent Reconnaissance Regiment (1961–73, Brzeg, Poland)
  - 511th Independent Yasskiy Reconnaissance Regiment (1960–65, Buyalyk, near Odessa)
  - 886th Independent Stalingradskiy Reconnaissance Regiment (1966–70, Jēkabpils, Latvia)

== Surviving aircraft ==
A Yak-27R is preserved at the Central Air Force Museum at Monino, outside of Moscow, Russia.

There are also another two airframes preserved in Germany, one at Hugo Junkers Museum Dessau and the other at Speyer Technic Museum, however the latter is in poor condition.

== Specifications (Yak-27R) ==
General characteristics

- Crew: 2
- Length: 18.55 m (60 ft 10 in)
- Wingspan: 11.82 m (38 ft 9 in)
- Height: 4.05 m (13 ft 3 in)
- Wing area: 28.94 m^{2} (311.5 sq ft)
- Empty weight: 6,983 kg (15,395 lb)
- Gross weight: 10,700 kg (23,589 lb)
- Max takeoff weight: 13,600 kg (29,983 lb)
- Powerplant: 2 × Tumansky RD-9F turbojet engines, 37.2 kN (8,400 lbf) thrust each

Performance

- Maximum speed: 1,285 km/h (798 mph, 694 kn)
- Range: 2,380 km (1,480 mi, 1,290 nmi)
- Service ceiling: 16,550 m (54,300 ft)
- Rate of climb: 95 m/s (18,700 ft/min)

Armament

- 1x 23 mm Nudelman-Rikhter NR-23 cannon

== See also ==
Related development

- Yakovlev Yak-25
- Yakovlev Yak-26
- Yakovlev Yak-28
