= Mikoyan-Gurevich MiG-19 =

Air superiority fighter aircraft family

MiG-19
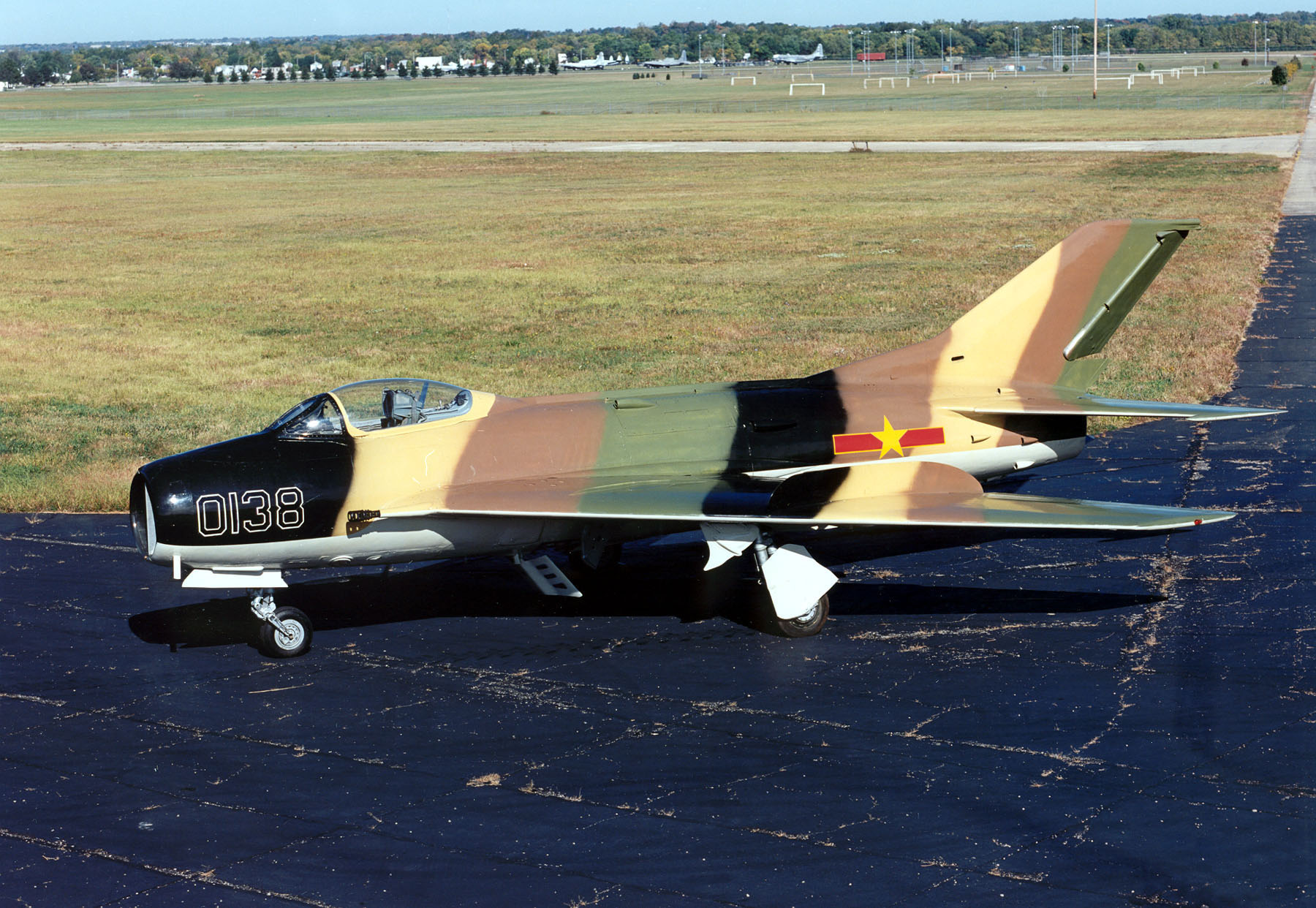
- MiG-19S in the National Museum of the United States Air Force

General information
- Type: Fighter aircraft
- National origin: Soviet Union
- Manufacturer: Mikoyan-Gurevich
- Status: Retired; Chinese license-build J-6 in limited use by some foreign countries
- Primary users: Soviet Air Forces (historical) People's Liberation Army Air Force (historical)
- Number built: 2,172 (excluding production in Czechoslovakia and China)

History
- Manufactured: 1954–1968
- Introduction date: March 1955
- First flight: 24 May 1952 (SM-2/I-360)
- Developed from: Mikoyan-Gurevich MiG-17
- Variant: Shenyang J-6

The Mikoyan-Gurevich MiG-19 (Russian: Микоян и Гуревич МиГ-19; NATO reporting name: Farmer) is a Soviet second generation, single-seat, twinjet fighter aircraft. It was the first Soviet production aircraft capable of supersonic speeds in level flight. A comparable U.S. "Century Series" fighter was the North American F-100 Super Sabre, although the MiG-19 primarily fought against the more modern McDonnell Douglas F-4 Phantom II and Republic F-105 Thunderchief over North Vietnam. This aircraft was originally used by the Soviet Union but it was later used by the People's Liberation Army Air Force of China.

== Design and development ==
In 1950 the Mikoyan-Gurevich (MiG) design bureau (also known as OKB-155) began work on a new fighter aircraft, intended to have a greater range than the existing MiG-15 and MiG-17 aircraft, and capable of reaching supersonic speeds in level flight. MiG chose to use two of the new Mikulin AM-5 axial jet engines (a smaller version of the Mikulin AM-3 that powered the Tupolev Tu-16 bomber) for its new fighter. As a test bed for the new engine, OKB-155 was authorised on 20 April 1951 to convert one of the prototype MiG-17s, replacing the single Klimov VK-1 engine with two 19.60 kN (4,410 lbf) AM-5s (later replaced by 21.08 kN (4,740 lbf) AM-5As), with the testbed, called SM-1 (or I-340), flying late in 1951. While the SM-1 was a useful testbed, its performance was less than expected, and an afterburner was designed for the AM-5, the AM-5F (reaching 26.45 kN (5,950 lbf) with afterburner).

While the SM-1 was a test bed, the SM-2 (or I-360) was intended as the required supersonic escort fighter, with work authorised on 10 August 1951. The SM-2 was a twin-engined, mid-winged aircraft. Its thin wings, which had been designed at TsAGI, the Soviet Central Aerohydrodynamic Institute, for supersonic flight, were swept back at an angle of 55 degrees and had a wing fence on each side. Unusually, a T-tail was fitted. Armament was two Nudelman N-37 37-mm cannon in the leading edges of the wings, near the wing roots – the guns had been moved compared to those in the MiG-15 and -17 to avoid ingestion of gun blast gases causing surging of the aircraft's engines. The first SM-2, the SM-2/1 was sent to the Letno-Issledovatel'skiy Institut (en:flight research institute) (LII) in April 1952 for testing, and was flown for the first time on 24 May 1952, with test pilot G. A. Sedov flying. With the AM-5A engines without an afterburner the SM-2 could not exceed the speed of sound in level flight. To solve this, AM-5F engines with afterburners were substituted. While the new engines improved performance, the aircraft was found to have handling problems, particularly at high angles of attack, where the aircraft was prone to spinning. To solve these problems the horizontal tail was lowered, with other changes including moving the aircraft's air brakes and deepening the wing fences, with the modifications causing the aircraft to be renamed SM-2A and then SM-2B.

The AM-5F still generated inadequate thrust and so the Mikulin engine design bureau developed a new engine to replace it, the AM-9B (later the Tumansky RD-9), rated at 25.5 kN (5,700 lbf) dry and 31.87 kN (7,160 lbf) with afterburner. When fitted with the new engines, the SM-2B became the SM-9, first flying in this form on 5 January 1954. The SM-9s performance impressed the Soviet authorities, and it was ordered into production as the MiG-19 on 17 February 1954, despite the fact that factory testing had only just started.

The rush to get the MiG-19 into service resulted in initial production aircraft having some serious problems. The type suffered a number of airborne explosions, eventually traced to poor insulation between the aircraft's engines and fuel tanks in the rear fuselage - overheating of these tanks could cause fuel explosions. This was eventually partly solved by fitting a metal heat shield between the engines and the tanks. The aircraft's elevators proved ineffective at supersonic speeds, and an all-moving slab tail was tested by the second and third SM-9 prototypes, and later included in the main production type, the MiG-19S, which also featured an improved armament.

At the same time that the daylight escort fighter was developed from the SM-2 and SM-9 into the MiG-19 and MiG-19S, work went on in parallel to design and build a radar-equipped all-weather fighter, with the first prototype SM-7/1 flying for the first time on 28 August 1954. This prototype had a similar airframe to the first SM-9, including the conventional fixed horizontal tail, with the second and third SM-7s introducing similar changes to those tested on the SM-9 prototypes, including the slab tail. The all weather fighter entered production as the MiG-19P in 1955. Differences from the MiG-19S included RP-1 Izumrud radar in the aircraft's nose, with small radomes in the centre and on the top lip of the air intake and an armament of two cannon in the wing roots. From 1957, production of all weather fighters switched to the missile equipped MiG-19PM, with an armament of four K-5M air-to-air missiles, with the cannon removed.

In 1955, following American introduction of high-altitude reconnaissance balloons and overflights by British Canberra aircraft, that could not be intercepted by existing aircraft, together with intelligence reports of the development of the Lockheed U-2 with an even greater ceiling, development began on a specialist high-altitude version of the MiG-19, the MiG-19SV, which entered limited production. This had more powerful engines and was lightened, with seat back armour and one of the guns removed, while flap settings were adjusted to give greater lift at higher altitudes and a new pressure suit was introduced. These changes increased the aircraft's ceiling from 17,500 m (57,400 ft) to 18,500 m (60,700 ft). The prototype MiG-19SV was further modified (as the MiG-19SVK) with increased wingspan, giving a ceiling of 19,100 m (62,700 ft), but this was still inadequate to deal with the U-2, and effort was switched to adding rocket boosters.

== Operational history ==
=== Soviet Union ===
Deliveries of the new fighter to the Soviet Air Forces (VVS) began in June 1955, with the type being publicly unveiled on 3 July that year, when 48 MiG-19s took part in a flypast during an airshow at Tushino Airfield, Moscow.

During their service with Soviet Anti-Air Defense and in East Germany, MiG-19s were involved in multiple interceptions of illegal overflights of Western reconnaissance aircraft. The first documented encounter with a Lockheed U-2 took place in the autumn of 1957. The MiG-19 pilot reported seeing the aircraft, but could not make up the 3,000 m (9,800 ft) difference in altitude. When Francis Gary Powers's U-2 was shot down in the 1960 incident, one pursuing MiG-19P was also hit by the salvo of S-75 Dvina (NATO: SA-2 "Guideline") missiles, killing the pilot Sergei Safronov. In a highly controversial incident, on 1 July 1960, a MiG-19 shot down an RB-47H (S/N 53-4281) reconnaissance aircraft which the Americans claimed was in international airspace over the Arctic Circle with four of the crew killed and two captured by the Soviets (they were released in 1961). In another incident, on 28 January 1964, a MiG-19 shot down a T-39 Sabreliner which had intruded into East German airspace while on a training mission; all three crewmembers were killed.

=== East Asia ===
==== China ====
The first use and loss of a U.S. fighter to a MiG-19 (J-6) was in 1965 when a USAF Lockheed F-104 Starfighter piloted by Captain Philip E. Smith was intercepted by a PLAAF aircraft after illegally flying into Chinese airspace over Hainan Island. His Starfighter took cannon fire which damaged a portion of his wing and missile mount. Smith attempted to attack the defending aircraft and stated he received missile tone on the MiG but, shortly after pressing his missile firing button, his Starfighter lost all power. He ejected and was captured. Smith was held prisoner until he was released on 15 March 1973, due to improving US-China relations following U.S. President Richard Nixon's visit to China in 1972.

==== Vietnam ====
The supersonic speed advantage provided by the MiG-21's more modern turbojet engine was found to be not as useful in combat as originally thought, because aerial dogfights at the time were conducted almost entirely at subsonic speeds. The J-6 (and hence the MiG-19 too) was found to be more maneuverable than the MiG-21 and, although slower, its acceleration during dogfights was considered adequate. The North Vietnamese Air Force fielded at least one unit of J-6s during the war, the 925th Fighter Regiment, beginning in 1969.

The MiG-19 was tested by U.S. pilots in the United States in 1969 after receiving an F-6 (J-6 export model) from Pakistan. (Note: This MiG-19 is currently on display at the National Museum of the USAF in Dayton, Ohio. Courtesy of the USAF 457th Technical Evaluation Squadron, Nellis AFB, Area 51.) In addition to finding the aircraft to have a good canopy allowing good visibility for the pilot, along with three hard-hitting 30mm cannons, U.S. pilots found the MiG-19 (J-6/F-6) to be an excellent fighter, "like the MiG-17, it could easily out-turn the Phantom...and could out-accelerate the F-4 out to Mach 1.2, but was slower than the MiG-21.". However, the MiG-19's greatest fault was its extremely short range, as one U.S. test pilot remarked, "after going in full after-burner at low altitude for five minutes, the MiG driver will be looking for a place to land!" This, combined with the aircraft's twin engines, which were difficult to maintain, made the MiG-19 unpopular with North Vietnamese pilots.

==== North Korea ====
North Korea received an unknown number of MiG-19S from the Soviet Union following the signing of a mutual assistance treaty in 1961. Thirty of these aircraft may have been sold to Iraq in 1983. At least 100 F-6s were acquired from China in 1988–89. As of April 2002, the Korean People's Army Air and Anti-Air Force was reportedly operating about 100 Shenyang J-6 and/or MiG 19s.

As of 2014, North Korea was still operating MiG-19s as well as MiG-17s and MiG-21s.

=== Middle East ===
==== Egypt ====
One of the first Egyptian MiG-19 units was the 15th Air Brigade, consisting of Nos 20 and 21 Squadrons, which became operational at Fayid with a forward location at Milayz in the early 1960s.

In 1962, Egyptian MiG-19s saw some action in the ground-attack role during the North Yemen Civil War. The first reported air combat in the Middle East with the MiG-19 happened on 29 November 1966 when an Israeli Air Force (IAF) Dassault Mirage III shot down two Egyptian MiG-19s which were trying to intercept an Israeli reconnaissance Piper J-3 Cub in Israeli airspace. The first MiG was destroyed with a R.530 radar-guided missile at a range of less than 1.6 km (one mile), marking the first aerial kill for the French-made missile. The second MiG-19 was dispatched with cannon fire.

Around 80 MiG-19s were in service with Egypt during the Six-Day War in June 1967, but more than half of them were destroyed on the ground during the opening Israeli airstrikes of Operation Focus. Israeli pilots, however, did find the MiG-19 a potentially dangerous adversary because of its performance, maneuverability, and heavy armament.

Following the war, the Egyptians reorganized their surviving MiG-19 fleet, and assigned them to the air defense of Egypt's interior. The Soviet Union did not supply Egypt with any additional MiG-19s as replacements for those destroyed in the Six-Day War, but Egypt might have received some from Syria and Iraq, so that by the end of 1968 there were more than 80 MiG-19s in service with the Egyptian Air Force. The aircraft also saw combat during the War of Attrition; in one engagement on 19 May 1969, a MiG-19 engaged two Israeli Mirages, shooting down one with cannon fire while the other escaped.

==== Iran ====
Iran received 18 J-6s from North Korea in the late 1980s, and used them in the later stages of the Iran-Iraq War, thought there is no record of them seeing any air-to-air combat and they are now retired.

==== Iraq ====
Iraq obtained some MiG-19S fighters in the early 1960s, but later sold most of them (a couple remaining in local museums), though a few remaining airframes did see some action against the Kurds in the 1960s.

==== Syria ====
The Syrian Air Force used MiG-19s in the Yemen War.

=== Failed bids ===
==== India ====
India was reported to have been interested in the MiG-19, but later procured the MiG-21. Nevertheless, India imported the engines and subcomponents from the MiG-19 to aid the development of the HAL HF-24 Marut.

== Variants ==
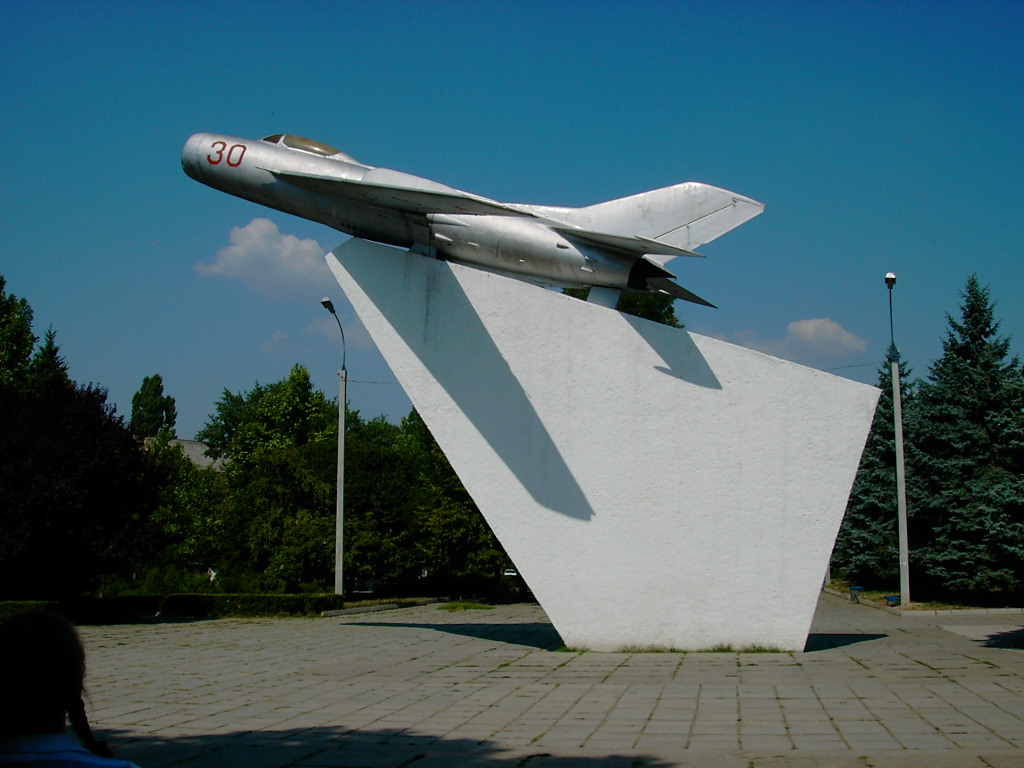
MiG-19 in Tiraspol

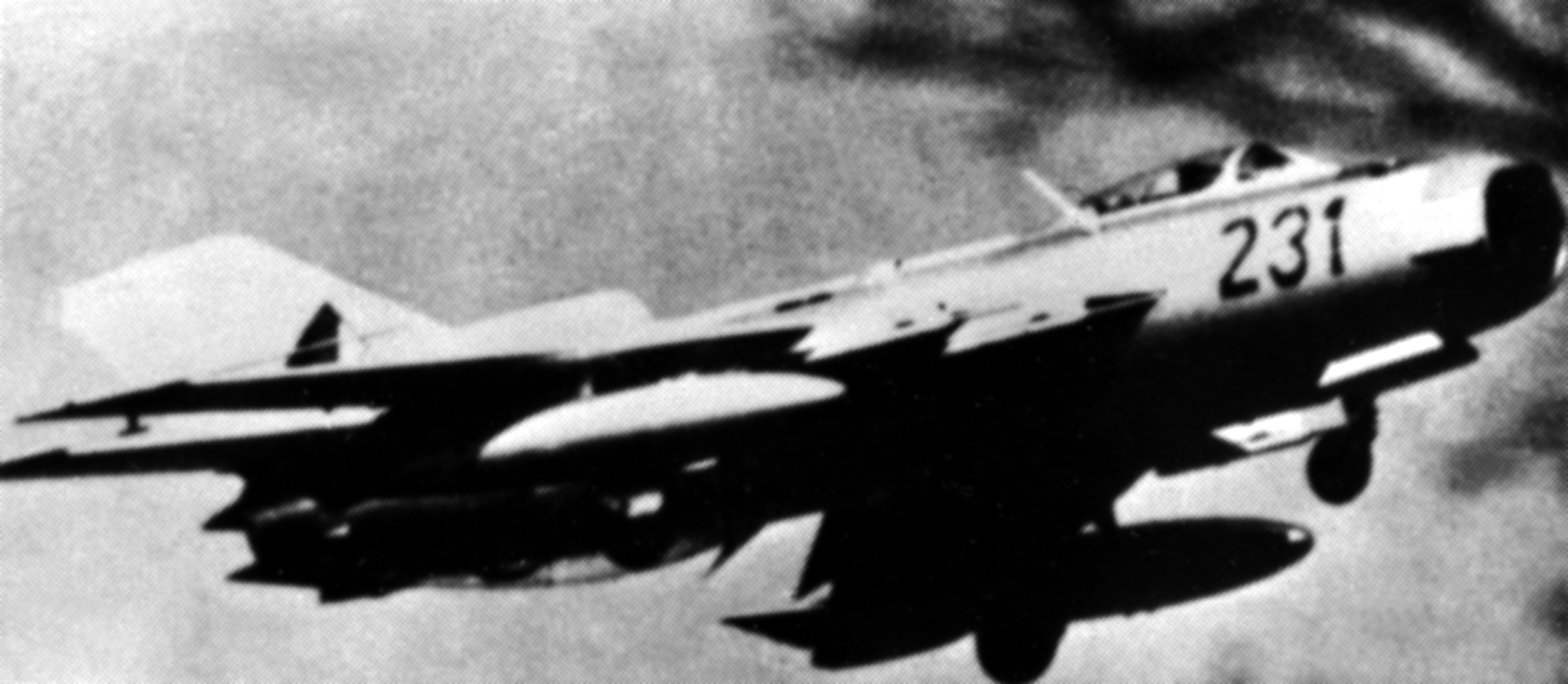
MiG-19PM with drop tanks.

=== Prototype designations ===
I-360
(Russian: И-360) Designation of the SM-2 prototypes.

=== Military designations ===
MiG-19
(Russian: МиГ-19) First production version based on the SM-9/1 prototype. Conventional tail assembly with elevators attached to fixed horizontal stabiliser and armed with three 23 mm NR-23 cannons.
MiG-19S
(Russian: МиГ-19С) Production derivative of the SM-9/3 prototype with all-moving stabilators. Other changes from the MiG-19 include an armament of three 30 mm NR-30 cannons (60 rounds in the fuselage gun and 70 rounds in each wing gun), a D-16 duralumin construction, strengthened wing spars, and a modified canopy with an electric jettison system. Avionics included the RSIU-4 Doob VHF radio, an OSP-48 instrument landing system, an ARK-4 Amur or ARK-5 radio compass, an MRK-48P marker receiver, an SRO-1 Bariy-M IFF system, a Sirena-2 radar warning receiver, and an ASP-5N-V3 gunsight. Most aircraft were fitted with an SRD-3M radar ranger, though the first production batch was fitted with the SRD-1M and the final batches from GAZ-153 (Novosibirsk) were fitted with the SRD-5. Had provisions for an ORO-32K rocket unguided rocket pack or a FAB-250 bomb under each wing, and from 1957 modified to allow four rocket pods to be carried. Entered production in 1956.
MiG-19SF
(Russian: МиГ-19СФ) Late production MiG-19S powered by the same uprated RD-9BF-1 engines as the MiG-19R.
MiG-19SV
(Russian: МиГ-19СВ) High-altitude variant for intercepting reconnaissance balloons and aircraft, reached 20,740 m (68,040 ft) on 6 December 1956. Although 100 aircraft were requested by the Soviet Air Force, far less had actually been built.
MiG-19SVK
(Russian: МиГ-19СВК) MiG-19SV with a new wing, small increase in altitude above MiG-19SV; did not warrant production.
MiG-19SU
(Russian: МиГ-19СУ) Testbeds for a RU-013 rocket mounted in a jettisonable U-19 booster pack, which was mounted under the fuselage. The MiG-19SU was powered by RD-9BM engines with variable afterburning thrust. The fuselage gun was removed to make room for a nose-mounted telemetry antenna. Five MiG-19S aircraft were modified.
MiG-19P
(Russian: МиГ-19П) All-weather fighter variant based on the SM-7/3 prototype with RP-5 Izumrud radar in the nose (mounted in a more pointed radome than the prototype) and armed with two NR-23 cannons in the wings (despite reports to the contrary, no aircraft of this variant were armed with the NR-30 cannon). The aircraft also had an elongated tailfin fillet faired into a fuselage spine, an all-moving tailplane, and a third air brake added behind the ventral fin. After the first production batch, a rudder trimmer was added and the port wingtip air data boom was removed. Production began at GAZ-21 (Gor'kiy) in November 1955, with roughly 200 being built for the Soviet Air Force, 27 for Czechoslovakia, 12 for Poland, and 15 for Bulgaria. In 1960, surviving MiG-19Ps were upgraded with the capability of launching two R-13A (R-3S, NATO: AA-2A 'Atoll') air-to-air missiles. All aircraft were built to one of two standards:
- MiG-19PG, (Russian: МиГ-19ПГ) MiG-19P equipped with a Gorizont-1 ground-controlled interception (GCI) receiver.
- MiG-19PL, (Russian: МиГ-19ПЛ) MiG-19P equipped with a Lazur GCI receiver.

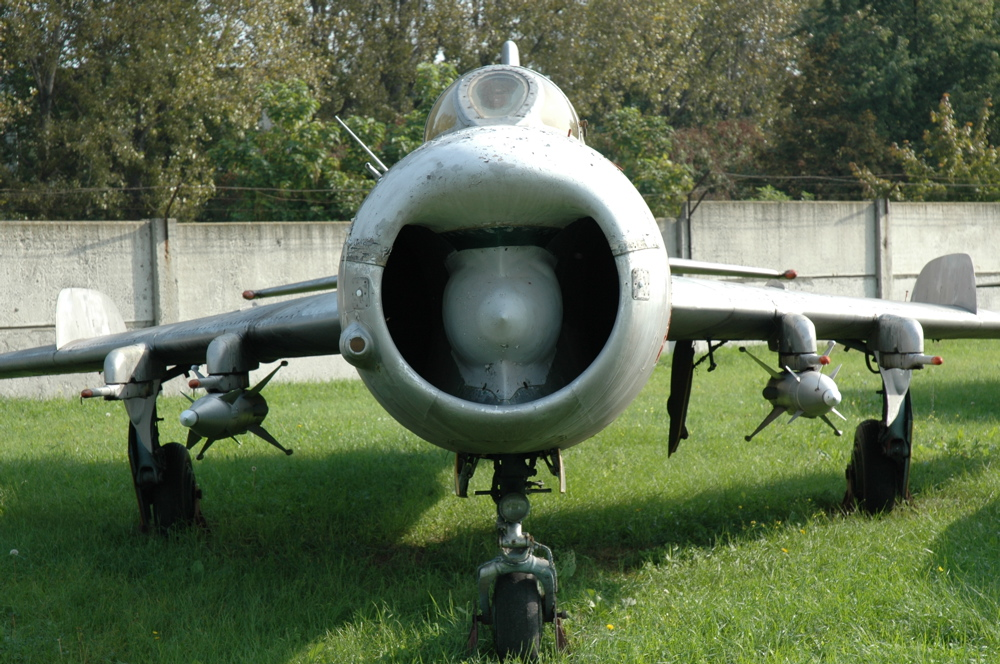
MiG-19PM shows the nose inlet housing the radar.

MiG-19PM
(Russian: МиГ-19ПМ) Missile-armed variant based on the SM-7/2M prototype with four K-5M (NATO: AA-1 "Alkali") beam-riding missiles. Entered production in 1957, with a total of about 260 MiG-19PM and MiG-19PML aircraft being built exclusively by GAZ-21 (Gor'kiy).
MiG-19PML
(Russian: МиГ-19ПМЛ) MiG-19PM with a Lazur GCI receiver.
MiG-19PU
(Russian: МиГ-19ПУ) MiG-19P modified as a testbed for a similar rocket configuration to the MiG-19SU. The MiG-19PU was fitted with an improved U-19D rocket pack, which allowed the rocket motor to be started and stopped up to five times per flight. Power was provided by two Sorokin R3M-26 turbojets, each delivering 3,800 kg (8,400 lb) of afterburning thrust.
MiG-19R
(Russian: МиГ-19Р) Reconnaissance variant with either an AFA-39 camera or a BA-40 camera with a MAG-9 voice recorder. Only a small number were built.
MiG-19M
(Russian: МиГ-19М) Older MiG-19S aircraft converted into unmanned target drones.
SL-19
(Russian: СЛ-19) A production MiG-19 modified as a testbed for variable track / skid-base skid undercarriage.

While some Western media circulated a photo of an aircraft purported to be a two-seat "MiG-19UTI", this was a hoax. No two-seat MiG-19 was ever built in the Soviet Union, though some were built in China as the Shenyang JJ-6.

=== OKB designations ===
Samolyot SM-2
(Russian: Самолёт СМ-2) Two prototypes for a twin-engined fighter derivative of the MiG-17 inspired by the SM-1 testbed. The SM-2 had a longer fuselage than the MiG-17 and a tailpipe similar to the SM-1, while the wing was entirely redesigned with a reduced span, a greater sweepback, and a single fence on each wing. Like previous MiG jet fighters, the SM-2's vertical stabilizer had a straight leading edge. OKB drawings showed the airbrakes as being located behind the wing, though on the actual aircraft they were located near the tail. Armament consisted of two 37 mm Nudelman N-37D autocannons; one in each wing root with 100 rounds each. Both prototypes were initially fitted with a T-tail. Avionics included an RSIU-3 VHF radio, an ARK-5 radio compass, an S-13 gun camera, and an RV-2 radar altimeter.
- Samolyot SM-2/1, first prototype initially powered by two non-afterburning Mikulin AM-5A engines; each delivering 2,000 kg (4,400 lb) of thrust. The engines were eventually replaced with afterburning AM-5F engines; each delivering a maximum of 2,700 kg (6,000 lb) of thrust. Due to ineffectiveness at transonic speeds and buffeting at high angles of attack, the tailplane was relocated to the base of the vertical stabilizer in autumn 1952. Other changes made around this time included the addition of muzzle breaks to the guns, collector boxes to prevent spent casings from damaging the tail, a Radal-M radar ranger linked to the ASP-4N gunsight, an SRZO Uzel IFF system, and enlarged airbrakes.
- Samolyot SM-2/2, second prototype similar to the first but with a different flight control system. As with the SM-2/1, the tailplane was eventually lowered, though this time to a lower position on the fuselage to remedy control issues encountered during testing. These issues also led to the wing fences being enlarged.
Samolyot SM-2A
(Russian: Самолёт СМ-2А) MiG-19 modified as a testbed for the ARS-70 rocket launcher, being fitted with two or four of such.
Samolyot SM-2B
(Russian: Самолёт СМ-2Б) This designation was assigned to two different variants:
- A small production batch based on the SM-2 and powered by AM-5F engines. These were built at the GAZ-21 (Gor'kiy) factory in 1953.
- A MiG-19 modified as a testbed for two TRS-190 rockets.
Samolyot SM-2D
(Russian: Самолёт СМ-2Д) MiG-19S modified as a testbed for various systems.
Samolyot SM-2/G
(Russian: Самолёт СМ-2/Г) a weapons test-bed for ARS-160 HVARs, discontinued when the SM-2/G was almost complete.
Samolyot SM-2I
(Russian: Самолёт СМ-2И) Early-production MiG-19 modified as a testbed for the K-6 missile.
Samolyot SM-2V
(Russian: Самолёт СМ-2В) MiG-19 modified as a testbed for two ARS-212 rockets.
Samolyot SM-9/1
(Russian: Самолёт СМ-9/1) SM-2/2 modified as first SM-9 prototype with two Mikulan AM-9 (later redesignated Tumansky RD-9) engines; each delivering 2,600 kg (5,700 lb) dry thrust or 3,250 kg (7,170 lb) afterburning thrust. Flight testing of this prototype revealed multiple handling issues.
Samolyot SM-9
(Russian: Самолёт СМ-9) OKB designation for the production MiG-19.
Samolyot SM-9/2
(Russian: Самолёт СМ-9/2) prototype fitted with stabilators in an attempt to remedy the handling problems encountered during test flights of the SM-1. The vertical stabilizer was enlarged and the nose was lengthened. The ailerons and air brakes were modified, with a third air brake being added under the fuselage. Following issues with production MiG-19s having difficulty jettisoning their canopies, the SM-2 was fitted with an improved jettison system. New avionics included the RSIU-4 Doob VHF radio, an ASP-5M gunsight, and an OSP-48 ILS.
Samolyot SM-9/3
(Russian: Самолёт СМ-9/3) prototype similar to the SM-9/2 but reverting to the short nose. The NR-23 guns were replaced by new 30 mm NR-30 cannons; one in the fuselage with 55 rounds and one in each wing with 75 rounds per gun. Flight testing revealed tailplane flutter issues, which were corrected by adding heavy rods to the tip of each tailplane. The aircraft was later fitted with an SRD-3 Grad radar ranger.
Samolyot SM-9R
(Russian: Самолёт СМ-9Р) OKB designation for the MiG-19R tactical reconnaissance aircraft.
Samolyot SM-9V
(Russian: Самолёт СМ-9В) OKB designation for the MiG-19SV high-altitude interceptor.
Samolyot SM-9/3T
(Russian: Самолёт СМ-9/3Т) MiG-19S modified as a testbed for the K-13 missile with guns removed.
Samolyot SM-6
(Russian: Самолёт СМ-6) Early-production MiG-19 modified as a testbed for the K-6 missile similar to the SM-2I.
Samolyot SM-7/1
(Russian: Самолёт СМ-7/1) First prototype of an all-weather fighter variant with a redesigned nose housing an RP-5 Izumrud radar, which replaced the SRD-1M ranging unit. The fuselage NR-23 cannon was removed to make room for the radar equipment, and the radio was rearranged and changed to an RSIU-4 unit. An S-13 camera was added to the nose, and two extra oxygen bottles were added to the KP-30 oxygen system; bringing the total to five. Despite some contemporary documents claiming that the SM-7/1 was modified from the SM-9/1 to save time, both prototypes are known to have coexisted and were developed in parallel. As such, the SM-7/1 suffered from many of the same handling issues as the SM-9/1.
Samolyot SM-7/2
(Russian: Самолёт СМ-7/2) Prototype similar to the SM-7/1 but with many of the improvements of the SM-9/3, including stabilators, an enlarged vertical stabilizer, and three air brakes.
Samolyot SM-7/3
(Russian: Самолёт СМ-7/3) Prototype similar to the SM-7/2 but with the dorsal fin faired into a new fuselage spine.
Samolyot SM-7
(Russian: Самолёт СМ-7) OKB designation for the production MiG-19P.
Samolyot SM-7/M
(Russian: Самолёт СМ-7/М) SM-7/1 prototype modified to launch the K-5M missile. The inboard wing hardpoints were replaced with two APU-4 launch rails under each wing, and the RP-5 radar was replaced by an RP-2U Izumrud-2 unit mounted in a modified nose with a deeper inlet. The gunsight was changed to an ASP-5N-VU, and a GIK-1 Earth inductor compass replaced the DGMK gyrocompass. In addition to the K-5M missile, the four launch rails were compatible with the unguided ARS-160 and ARS-212M rockets.
Samolyot SM-7/2M
(Russian: Самолёт СМ-7/2М) Prototype based on the SM-7/M but with stabilators, an added dorsal spine, and the port wingtip data probe removed.
Samolyot SM-10
(Russian: Самолёт СМ-10) A single production MiG-19 modified in 1955 as an aerial refueling testbed for use in conjunction with a Tupolev Tu-4 tanker. A refueling probe was installed on the port wingtip, requiring significant modifications. The oxygen system was increased in capacity to 18 L (4.8 US gal) to supply the pilot for up to ten hours. Although tests were successful, this system was never put into production due to a lack of funding. Another MiG-19 was modified with a refueling system in 1956 for trials with an Ilyushin Il-28 tanker. This aircraft was fitted with four probes in different locations.
Samolyot SM-11
(Russian: Самолёт СМ-11) A production MiG-19P modified in 1956 with a Yastreb forward-looking infrared sensor.
Samolyot SM-12
(Russian: Самолёт СМ-12) Four prototypes based on the MiG-19S but with new supersonic inlets with shock cones to increase speed. The fuselage gun was removed, and hardpoints were added for ORO-57 rocket launchers.
- SM-12/1, (Russian: Самолёт СМ-12/1) first prototype powered by RD-9BF-2 engines. An air data boom was installed on each wingtip, and the airbrakes were moved to the extreme end of the fuselage.
- SM-12/2, (Russian: Самолёт СМ-12/2) Second prototype powered by R3-26 engines. The aircraft had three air data booms; one ahead of the nosewheel bay and one on each wingtip.
- SM-12/3, (Russian: Самолёт СМ-12/3) Third prototype similar to the SM-12/2 but with wingtip air data booms removed and an enlarged steel panel near the guns. This aircraft was later modified as a testbed for the K-13A missile under the designation SM-12/3T.
- SM-12/4, (Russian: Самолёт СМ-12/4) Fourth prototype similar to the SM-12/2 but with wingtip air data booms removed. This aircraft was later modified as a testbed for the K-13A missile under the designation SM-12/4T.
Samolyot SM-12PM
(Russian: Самолёт СМ-12ПМ) Prototype similar to the SM-12/2 and SM-12/3 with R3-26 engines but with an RP-30 radar mounted in an enlarged shock cone, which in turn was surrounded by a larger inlet. The aircraft lacked guns, but was armed with up to four K-5M missiles on APU-4 launch rails (two in carrying fuel tanks).
Samolyot SM-12PMU
(Russian: Самолёт СМ-12ПМУ) Prototype similar to the SM-12PM but with R3M-26 engines and a U-19D rocket pod. This aircraft later became an avionics testbed.
Samolyot SM-20
(Russian: Самолёт СМ-20) MiG-19S modified as an unmanned testbed for the Kh-20 (NATO: AS-3 "Kangaroo") cruise missile guidance system. The SM-20 was carried under a Tupolev Tu-95K mother ship.
Samolyot SM-20P
(Russian: Самолёт СМ-20П) SM-20 with an improved fuel system to alleviate problems during engine startup at high altitudes. Also known as the SM-20/P.
Samolyot SM-21
(Russian: Самолёт СМ-21) A production MiG-19S modified in 1955 as a testbed for the S-21 unguided rocket.
Samolyot SM-24
(Russian: Самолёт СМ-24) MiG-19S modified as a testbed for various systems.
Samolyot SM-30
(Russian: Самолёт СМ-30) Production MiG-19 and MiG-19S aircraft modified as zero-length launch (ZELL) testbeds with PRD-22 solid-fuel booster rocket.
Samolyot SM-30/3
(Russian: Самолёт СМ-30/3) Parallel development of the SM-30 for short take-off rather than ZELL operations. The SM-30/3 was to use two PRD-23 JATO boosters. No aircraft was built.
Samolyot SM-50
(Russian: Самолёт СМ-50) OKB designation for the MiG-19SU testbed.
Samolyot SM-51
(Russian: Самолёт СМ-51) OKB designation for the MiG-19PU.
Samolyot SM-52
(Russian: Самолёт СМ-52) Rocket engine testbed similar to the MiG-19PU but with an Almaz radar.
Samolyot SM-52P
(Russian: Самолёт СМ-52П) SM-52 modified with a Gorizont GCI receiver and a Baza-6 radar ranger from the MiG-19PG.
Samolyot SM-K
(Russian: Самолёт СМ-К) Two MiG-19S aircraft modified as testbeds for the K-22 cruise missile guidance system. The first and second prototypes were respectively designated SM-K/1 and SM-K/2.

=== Factory designations ===
Izdeliye 59
(Russian: Изделие 59) internal GAZ-21 (Gor'kiy) designation of the MiG-19 initial production series.
Izdeliye 61
(Russian: Изделие 61) internal GAZ-21 (Gor'kiy) designation of the MiG-19S production series.
Izdeliye 62
(Russian: Изделие 62) internal GAZ-21 (Gor'kiy) designation of the MiG-19P production all-weather interceptor.
Izdeliye 65
(Russian: Изделие 65) internal GAZ-21 (Gor'kiy) designation of the MiG-19PM production series.

=== Czechoslovak variants ===
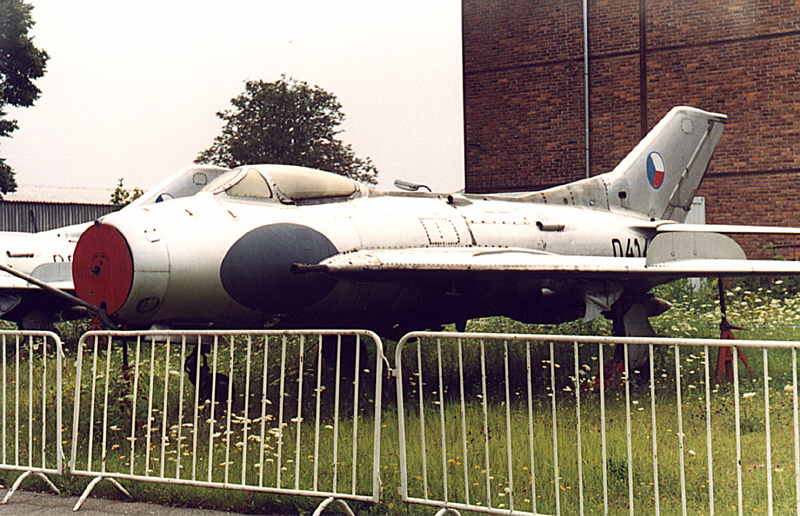
Czech S-105 at Prague Aviation Museum.

S-105
Czechoslovak licensed built MiG-19S by Aero Vodochody with imported engines. 103 were built between 1958 and 1962.

=== Foreign reporting names ===
Farmer-A
NATO reporting name for the original MiG-19.
Farmer-B
NATO reporting name for the MiG-19P.
Farmer-C
NATO reporting name for the MiG-19S, MiG-19SV, and MiG-19R.
Farmer-D
NATO reporting name for the MiG-19PM.

== Operators ==
This only includes Soviet-built MiG-19s. For information on operators of Chinese-built aircraft refer to Shenyang J-6.

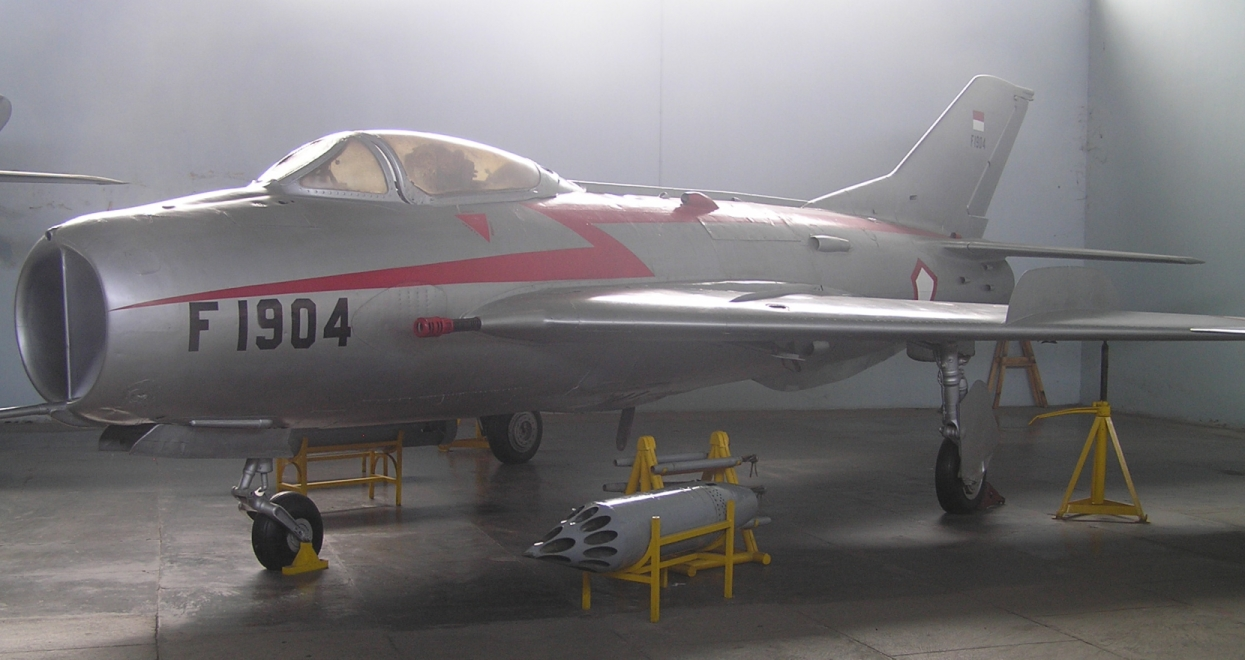
Indonesian Air Force MiG-19 at the Dirgantara Mandala Museum

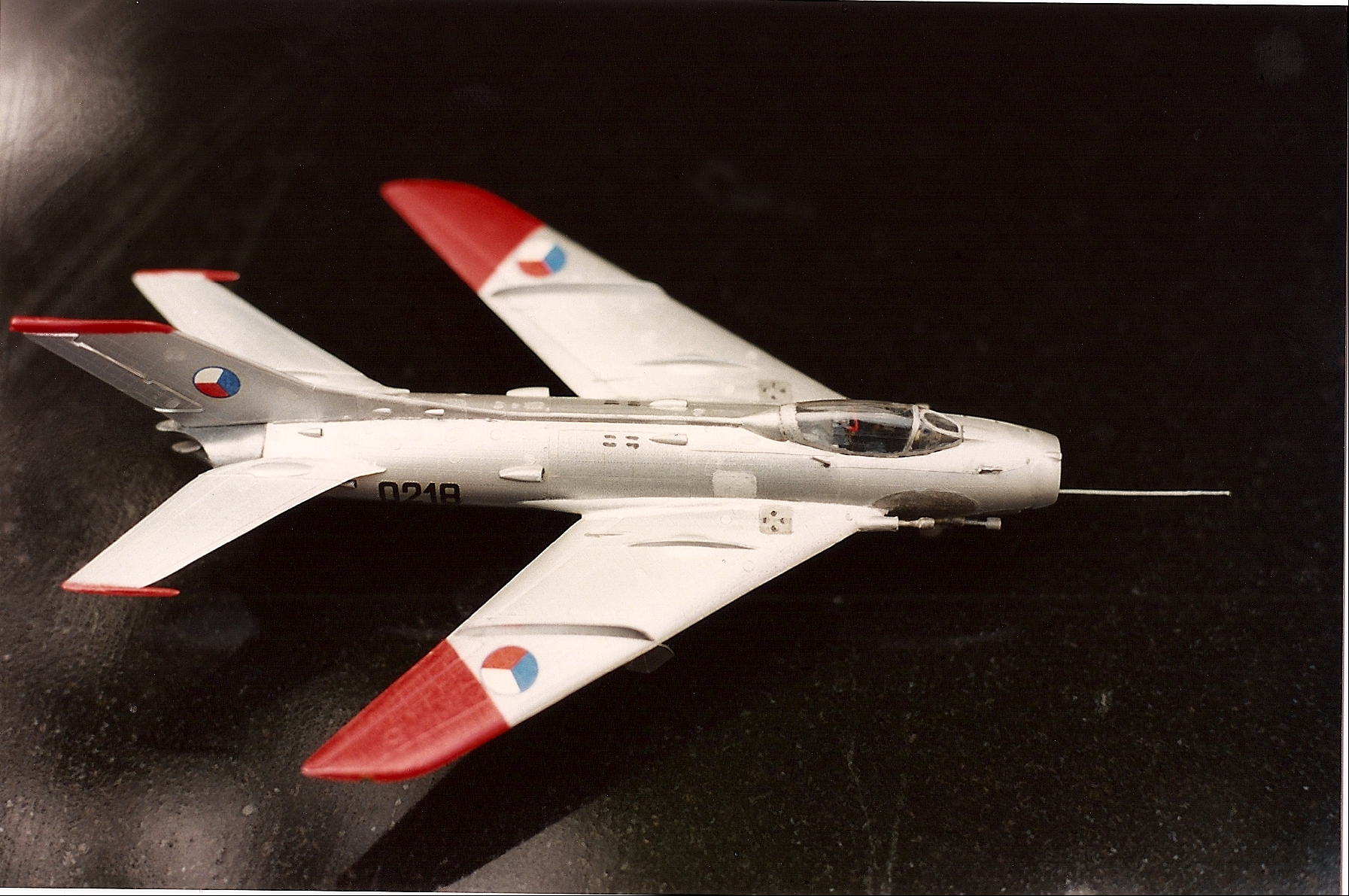
Scale model of a Czech MiG-19S

=== Former operators ===
Afghanistan

- Afghan Air Force - 18 acquired by the Royal Afghan Air Force in 1964. 20 MiG-19s were used as trainer aircraft by the Afghan Air Force during the DRA era.

Albania

- Albanian Air Force – Twelve Czechoslovak-built MiG-19PMs and three second-hand MiG-19Ss were provided. All were used by 7594IAP (7594th Aviation Regiment) at Rinas Air Base. Later, as Albania became closer to China, the F-6Cs were provided and the 12 MiG-19PMs were replaced.

Bulgaria

- Bulgarian Air Force – The MiG-19 served in the Bulgarian Air Force from 1957/58 into the 1970s. Both MiG-19S day fighters and MiG-19P and PM all-weather fighters were operated.

China

- People's Liberation Army Air Force

Cuba

- Cuban Air Force – From 1961, 12 MiG-19Ps were imported and put into operation. It was later replaced by aircraft such as the MiG-21 and MiG-23.

Czechoslovakia

- Czechoslovak Air Force – operated 183 MiG-19S, MiG-19P, MiG-19PM and license-built S-105

East Germany

- East German Air Force - 12 x MiG-19S and 12 x MiG-19PM served until 1969

Egypt

- Egyptian Air Force – One of the first Egyptian MiG-19 units was the 15th Air Brigade, consisting of Nos 20 and 21 Squadrons, which became operational at Fayid with a forward location at Milayz in the early 1960s.

Hungary

- Hungarian Air Force – Operated 12 MiG-19PM from 1959 to 1973.

Indonesia

- Indonesian Air Force – Acquired 10 MiG-19S in 1961 as a precondition for purchasing MiG-21F-13. At least one crashed in 1963. Several aircraft were later sold to Pakistan.

Iraq

- Iraqi Air Force – 30 MiG-19S, 10 MiG-19P, and 10 MiG-19PM were delivered in 1959 and 1960. However, only 16 MiG-19S were taken up by the Iraqi Air Force; the other aircraft were not accepted due to their poor technical condition, and remained stored in Basra. The surviving MiG-19S were donated to Egypt around 1964.

Pakistan

- Pakistan Air Force – Received 5 ex-Indonesian Air Force MiG-19S in December 1965.

Poland

- Polish Air Force – A total of 24 MiG-19P and 12 MiG-19PM interceptors served between 1957 and 1974.

Romania

- Romanian Air Force – A total of 16 MiG-19P and 10 MiG-19PM aircraft were in service between 1958 (1959 for the PM) and 1972.

Soviet Union

- Soviet Air Force
- Soviet Anti-Air Defence
- Soviet Naval Aviation

== Aircraft on display ==
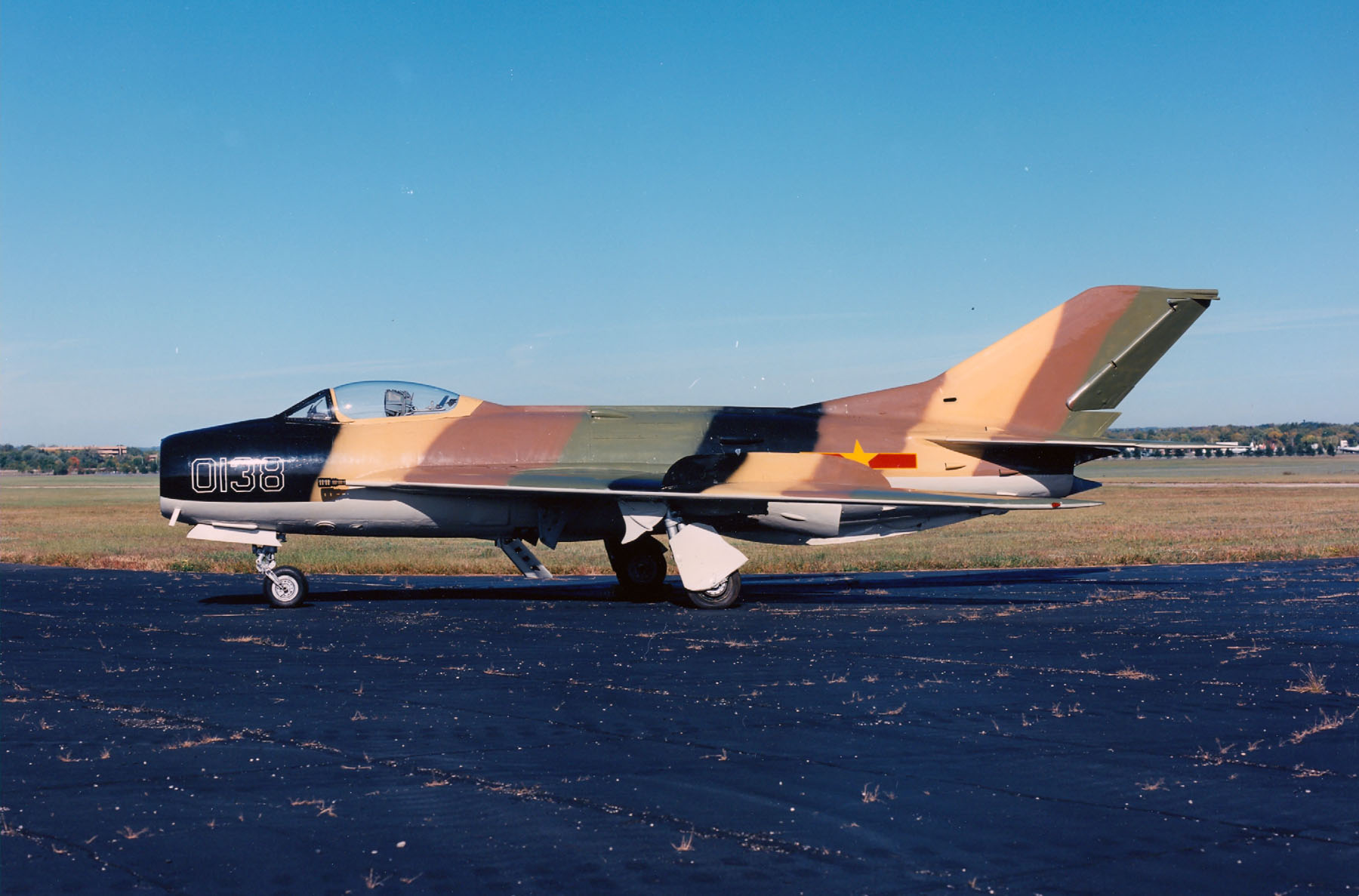
MiG-19S at the National Museum of the United States Air Force

- MIG-19S at the National Museum of the United States Air Force in Dayton, Ohio.
- Unknown model at the March Field Air Museum in Riverside County, California.

== Specifications (MiG-19S) ==
3-View drawing of MiG-19

Data from MiG:Fifty Years of Secret Aircraft Design

General characteristics

- Crew: 1
- Length: 12.54 m (41 ft 2 in) with pitot probe retracted; 14.64 m (48.0 ft) with pitot probe extended
- Wingspan: 9 m (29 ft 6 in)
- Height: 3.88 m (12 ft 9 in)
- Wing area: 25 m^{2} (270 sq ft)
- Airfoil: root: TsAGI SR-12S (8.74%); tip: TsAGI SR-7S (8%)
- Empty weight: 5,172 kg (11,402 lb)
- Gross weight: 7,560 kg (16,667 lb)
- Max takeoff weight: 8,832 kg (19,471 lb) with 2 × 760 L (170 imp gal; 200 US gal) drop tanks and two rocket pods
- Fuel capacity: 1,800 L (480 US gal; 400 imp gal) internal
- Powerplant: 2 × Tumansky RD-9B afterburning turbojet engines, 25.5 kN (5,700 lbf) thrust each dry, 31.8 kN (7,100 lbf) with afterburner

Performance

- Maximum speed: 1,452 km/h (902 mph, 784 kn) at 10,000 m (33,000 ft)
- Maximum speed: Mach 1.35
- Range: 1,390 km (860 mi, 750 nmi)
- Ferry range: 2,200 km (1,400 mi, 1,200 nmi) with 2 × 760 L (200 US gal; 170 imp gal) drop tanks at 14,000 m (46,000 ft)
- Service ceiling: 17,500 m (57,400 ft)
- Rate of climb: 177.8 m/s (35,000 ft/min)
- Wing loading: 301.4 kg/m^{2} (61.7 lb/sq ft)
- Thrust/weight: 0.85

Armament

- Guns: 3 × 30 mm Nudelman-Rikhter NR-30 autocannon (75 rounds for wing-root guns, 55 rounds for the fuselage gun)
- Hardpoints: 4 pylons in total, 2 for drop fuel tanks only, 2 for weapons, with a capacity of up to 500 kg (1,100 lb) of stores , with provisions to carry combinations of:
  - Rockets: 2 × 32-round ORO-57K rocket pods (4 from 1957)
  - Bombs: 2 × FAB-250

== See also ==
Related development

- Mikoyan-Gurevich MiG-17
- Nanchang Q-5
- Shenyang J-6

Aircraft of comparable role, configuration, and era

- Dassault Super Mystère
- North American F-100 Super Sabre

Related lists

- List of military aircraft of the Soviet Union and the CIS
- List of fighter aircraft
