= Yakovlev Yak-28 =

Family of Soviet jet combat aircraft

Yak-28
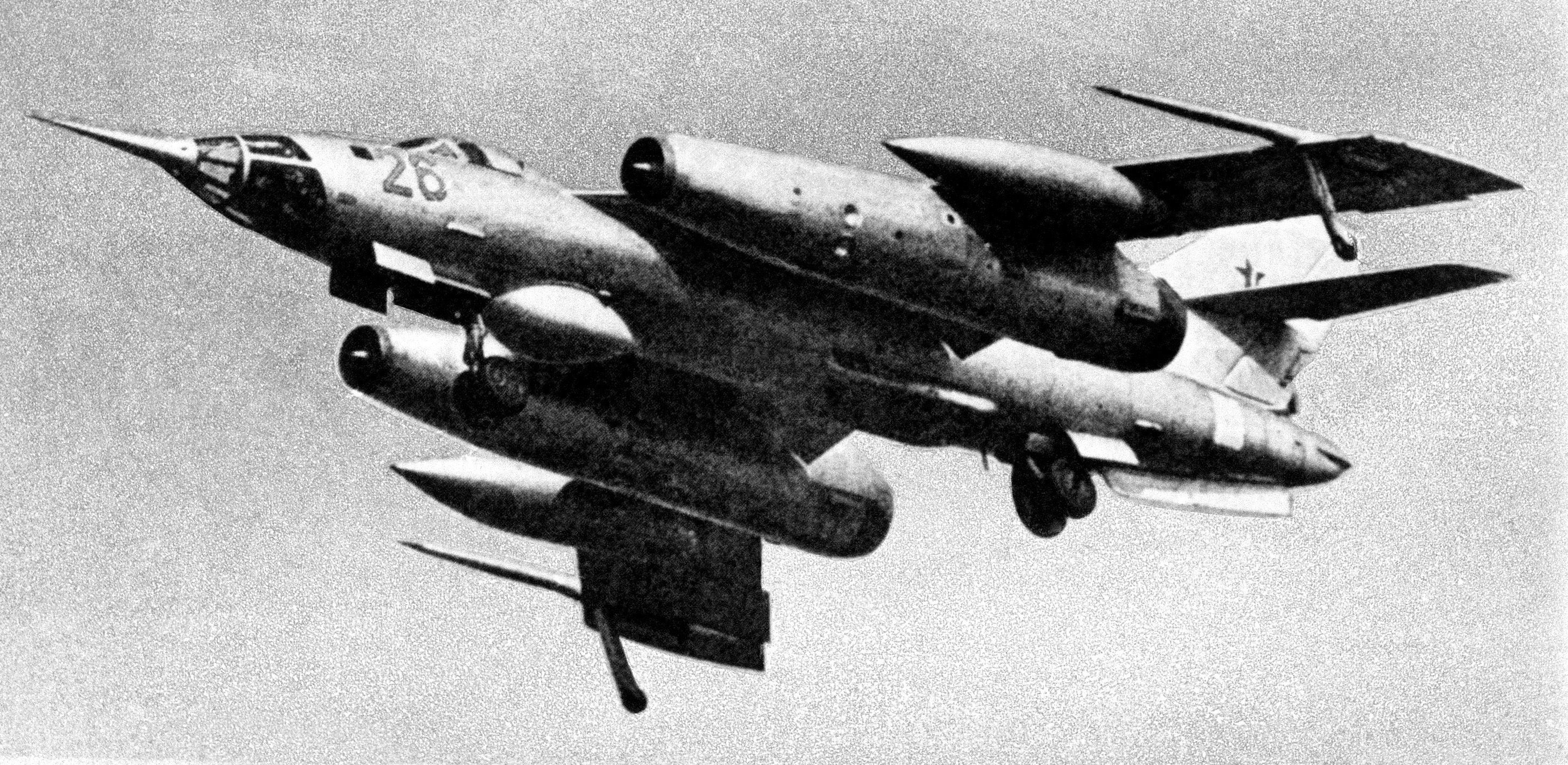
- Yak-28 in flight

General information
- Type: Medium bomber Reconnaissance; Electronic warfare Interceptor
- National origin: Soviet Union
- Manufacturer: Yakovlev
- Primary users: Soviet Air Forces Soviet Air Defence Forces; Russian Air Force; Ukrainian Air Force
- Number built: 1,180

History
- Introduction date: 1964
- First flight: 5 March 1958
- Retired: 1992 (Belarus)

The Yakovlev Yak-28 (Russian: Яковлев Як-28) is a swept wing, turbojet-powered combat aircraft used by the Soviet Union. Produced initially as a tactical medium bomber, it was also manufactured in reconnaissance, electronic warfare, interceptor, and trainer versions, known by the NATO reporting names Brewer, Brewer-E, Firebar, and Maestro respectively. Based on the Yak-129 prototype first flown on 5 March 1958, it began to enter service in 1964.

== Design and development ==
The Yak-28 was first seen by the West at the Tushino air show in 1961. Western analysts initially believed it to be a fighter rather than an attack aircraft (and a continuation of the Yak-25M—); after its actual role was realized, the Yak-28 bomber series was given the NATO reporting name "Brewer".

The Yak-28 had a large mid-mounted wing, swept at 45 degrees. The tailplane is set halfway up the vertical fin (with cutouts to allow rudder movement). Slats were fitted on the leading edges and slotted flaps were mounted on the trailing edges of the wings. The two Tumansky R-11 turbojet engines, initially with 57 kN (12,795 lbf) thrust each, were mounted in pods, similarly to the previous Yak-25. The wing-mounted engines and bicycle-type main landing gear (supplemented by outrigger wheels in fairings near the wingtips) were widely spaced, allowing most of the fuselage to be used for fuel and equipment. It was primarily subsonic, although Mach 1 could be exceeded at high altitude.

Total production of all Yak-28s was 1,180.

== Operational history ==
The aircraft is perhaps best known for the actions of Captain Boris Kapustin and Lieutenant Yuri Yanov after their Yak-28 suffered a catastrophic engine malfunction on 6 April 1966. They were ordered to divert to attempt a landing in Soviet zone of Germany, but lost control of the aircraft and strayed into West Berlin airspace. The crew managed to avoid a housing estate but crashed into Lake Stößensee without ejecting. Their bodies, along with the wreckage, were raised from the lake by Royal Navy divers (flown in from Portsmouth) and salvage specialists, who also retrieved important top secret material from the plane. This included the engines, which were taken to RAF Gatow to be inspected by RAF and NATO engineers. The bodies of the two pilots were returned to the USSR with full military honours from both Soviet and British armed service members, and they were both posthumously awarded the Order of the Red Banner. The first engine was recovered on 18 April 1966 and the second a week later; both engines were returned to the Soviets on 2 May 1966.

The Yak-28P was withdrawn in the early 1980s, but trainer and other versions remained in service until after the fall of the Soviet Union, flying until at least 1992. The reconnaissance and ECM aircraft were eventually replaced by variants of the Sukhoi Su-24.

== Variants ==
=== Prototype ===
Yak-129

Prototype of Yak-28.

Yak-28UVP prototype (ukorochennyy vzlyot i posahdka – short takeoff and landing)

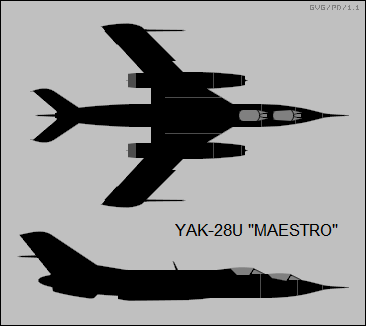
Yakovlev Yak-28U

A single Yak-28 converted for testing short takeoff and landing techniques with JATO bottles and braking parachutes.

Yak-28SR prototype (samolyot raspylitel – spraying/dusting aircraft) first use of SR.

Chemical warfare aircraft for dispensing dust or liquid agents from underwing tank/applicators. Though recommended for production none were delivered to the VVS.

Yak-28PM prototype

3-view drawing of Yak-28-64, a prototype that never entered service

Upgraded Yak-28P with R11AF3-300 engines, flight testing started in 1963 but development abandoned when the R11AF3-300 did not enter production.The re-engined "PM" modification has established a speed record of 2,400 km/h in 1963.

Yak-28URP prototype

High altitude interceptor prototype using a rocket engine to boost performance during the interception phase.

Yak-28-64 prototype

Extensively redesigned Yak-28P with Tumansky R-11F2-300 engines moved to the rear fuselage with intakes extending to the cockpit, intended to compete with the Sukhoi Su-15. Performance was very disappointing, being slower than the Yak-28P, and serious aileron reversal issues caused the abandonment of the Yak-28-64.

Yak-28VV proposition (vertikahl'nyy vzlyot – vertical take-off)

A vertical takeoff and landing project, with two R-27AF-300 lift/cruise engines and four R39P-300 lift engines in the forward fuselage.

Yak-28LSh proposition

Light attack aircraft project competing with the Ilyushin Il-102 and Sukhoi T-8, eliminated at an early stage.

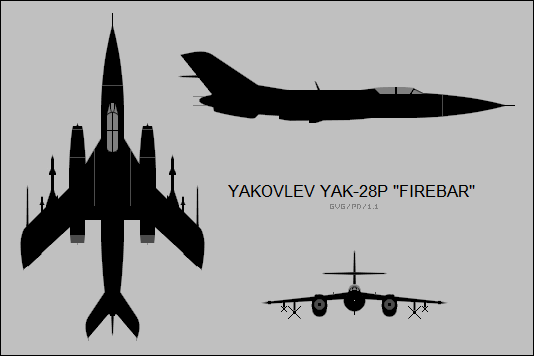
Yakovlev Yak-28P

Yak-28A (Izdeliye B)

The first tactical bombing mission training aircraft type produced. The radar and avionics on board are not yet complete, so it is assumed that it will be operated during the day. Basically, it was deployed as training for changing aircraft types for crew members and as a teaching material on the ground. After that, some parts and wiring positions were reflected in later mass-produced models.

=== Mass production type ===
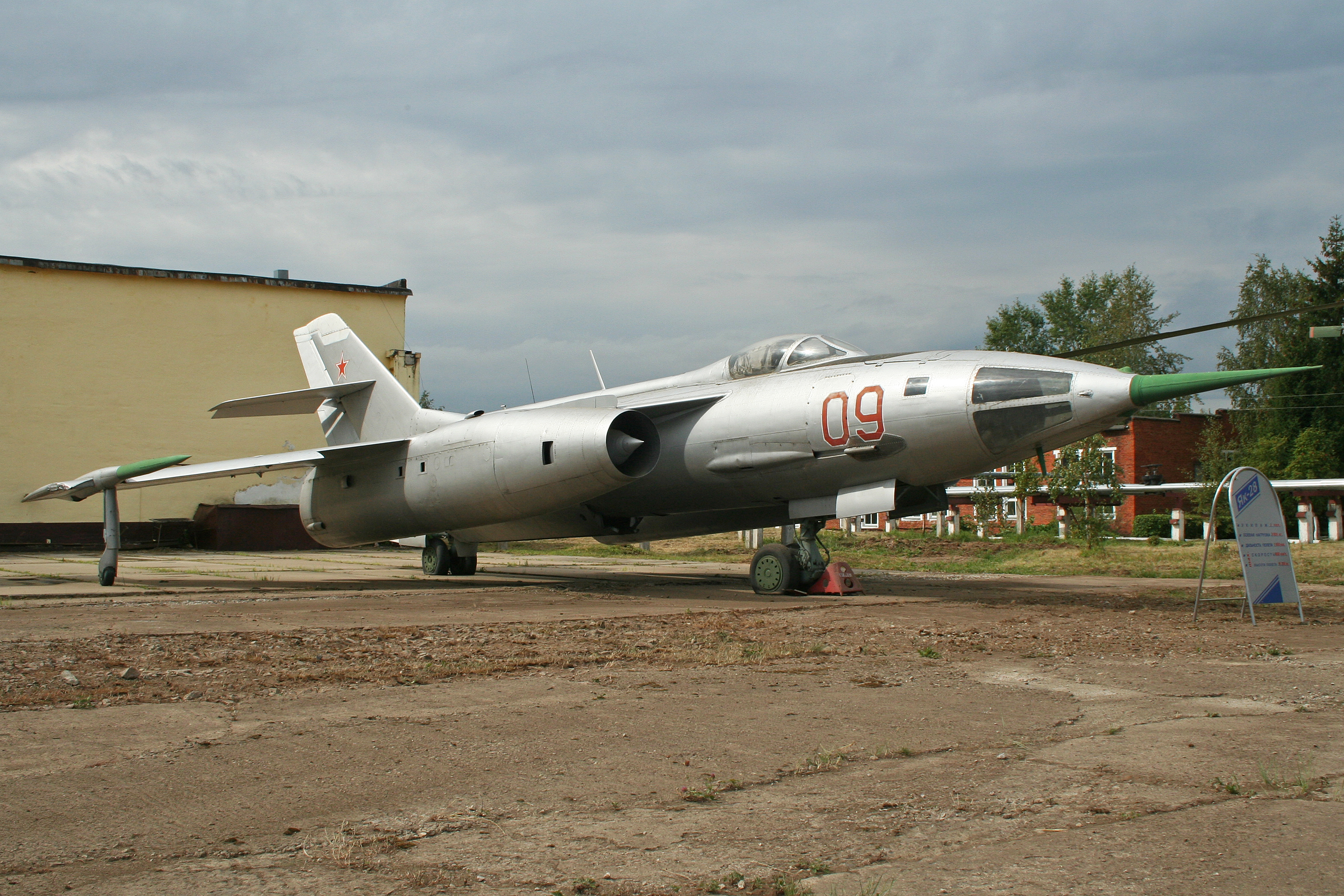
Yak-28L tactical bomber, featuring a glazed nose.

Yak-28B (Izdeliye 28B; NATO reporting name: "Brewer-A")

Production of Yak-28 with weapon-aiming radar fitted, and various improvements such as fittings for JATO bottles. Production number unknown.

Yak-28L (Izdeliye 28L; NATO reporting name: "Brewer-B")

Tactical bomber with ground-controlled targeting system using triangulation from ground-based transmitter sites. A total of 111 built.

Yak-28I (Izdeliye 28I; NATO reporting name: "Brewer-C")

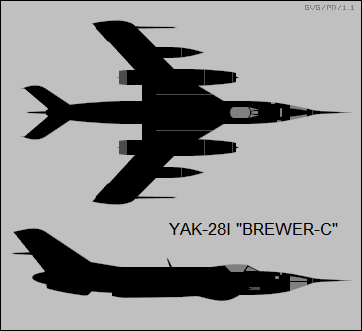
Yakovlev Yak-28I

Tactical bomber with the internal targeting system "Initsiativa-2" 360-degree ground-mapping radar. A total of 223 built.

Yak-28U (Izdeliye 28U) (uchebnyy – training) (NATO reporting name – "Maestro")

It was a dual control trainer with a second cockpit in the nose for student pilots; made as a prototype in 1962. A total of 183 were built.

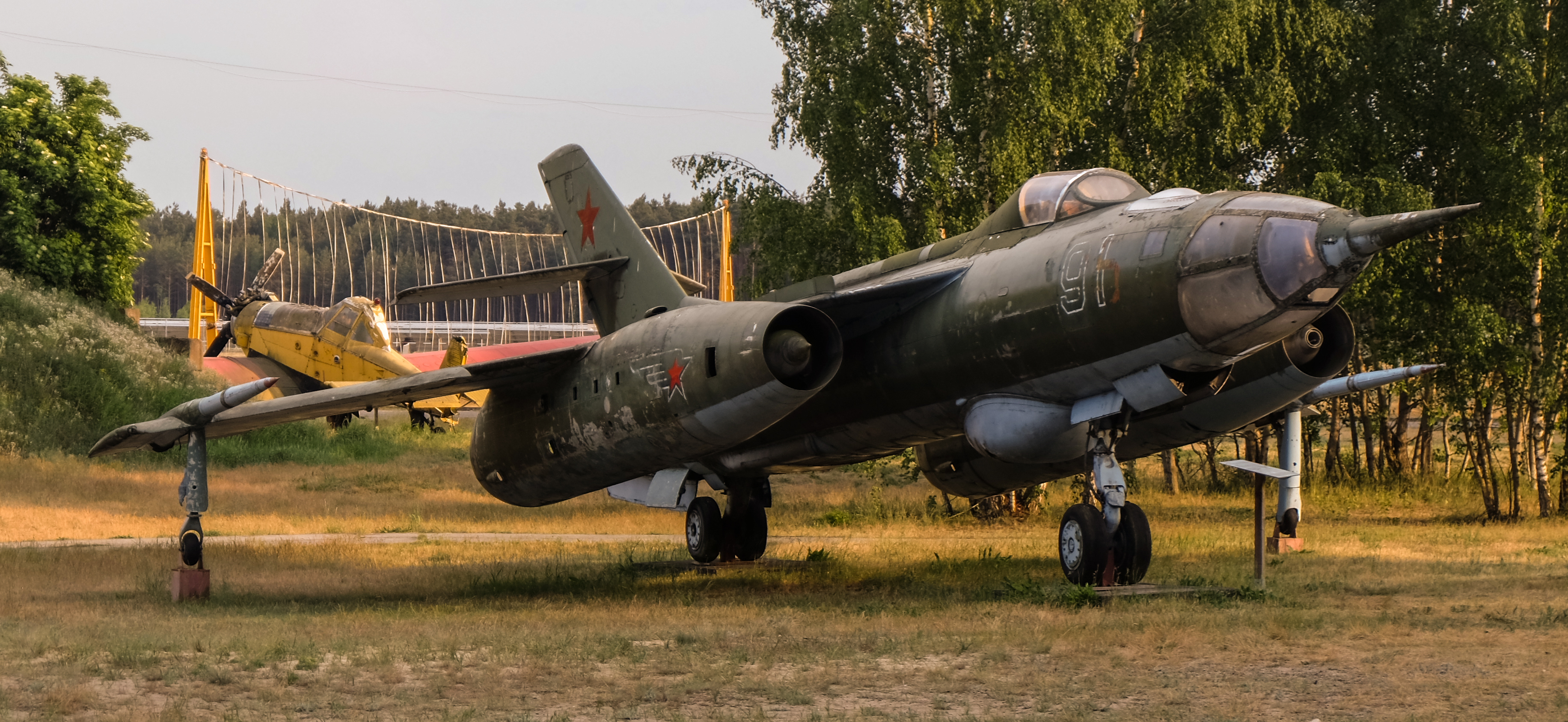
Yak-28R

Yak-28R (Izdeliye 28R; NATO reporting name: "Brewer-D")

A dedicated tactical reconnaissance version of the Yak-28I, with increased headroom under the pilot´s canopy, increased nose glazing with a sloping rear bulkhead, Initsiativa-2 radar, and five interchangeable pallets containing various mission equipment fittings. Prototype in 1963. A total of 183 built.

Yak-28SR (Izdeliye 28SR) second use of SR.

Tactical reconnaissance aircraft fitted with an active radio/radar jammer (either SPS-141 or SPS-143). Production was on a very small scale.

Yak-28TARK (televiszionnyy aviatsionnyy razveddyvatel'nyy kompleks)

Television reconnaissance system to send real-time images to a ground base. Backup provided by a 190 mm focal length still camera.

Yak-28RR (Izdeliye 28RR)

Radiation intelligence aircraft with RR8311-100 air sampling pods, for gathering samples of nuclear tests. The pods were specially designed for the Yak-28RR but became standard fit for all subsequent radiation intelligence gathering aircraft. Modification of a number of existing Yak-28R aircraft.

Yak-28RL

Radiation Intelligence aircraft conceived by fitting RR8311-100 air sampling pods, with no other specialist equipment. Modification of a number of existing Yak-28L aircraft.

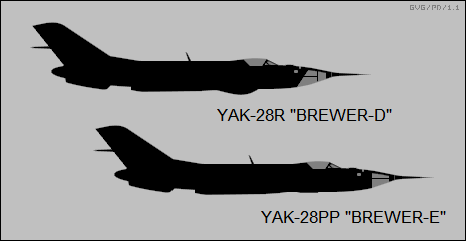
Yakovlev Yak-28R and Yak-28PP

Yak-28PP (Izeliye 28PP) (NATO reporting name – "Brewer-E")

Deployed in 1970, it is notable as the first Soviet electronic countermeasures (ECM) aircraft. It was unarmed, with an extensive electronic warfare (EW) suite in the bomb bay and various aerials and dielectric panels for transmitting the jamming signals. Excess heat generated by the jamming equipment was dissipated by heat exchangers under the centre fuselage; it did not include a radome. Produced in the 1970s in unknown numbers.

Yak-28P (Izdeliye 40) (NATO reporting name – "Firebar")

A dedicated long-range interceptor version, the Yak-28P was developed from 1960 and deployed operationally from 1964. It omitted the internal weapons bay in favor of additional fuselage tanks (its fuel capacity was considerable, limited by weight rather than volume), and added a new 'Oriol-D' interception radar compatible with the R-98 (AA-3 'Anab') air-to-air missile. Late production "upgraded" Yak-28Ps had a longer radome of pure conical shape and enhanced armament. Produced until 1967, with 435 built.

== Operators ==
Russia

- Russian Air Force

Soviet Union

- Soviet Air Force
- Soviet Air Defence Forces

Turkmenistan

- Military of Turkmenistan

Ukraine

- Ukrainian Air Force operated 35 aircraft.
  - 118th Independent Aviation Regt EW Chortkiv (Yak-28 Brewer E (30), Su-24MP (12)) listed in early 1994 (Air Forces Monthly March 1994)

== Specifications (Yak-28P) ==
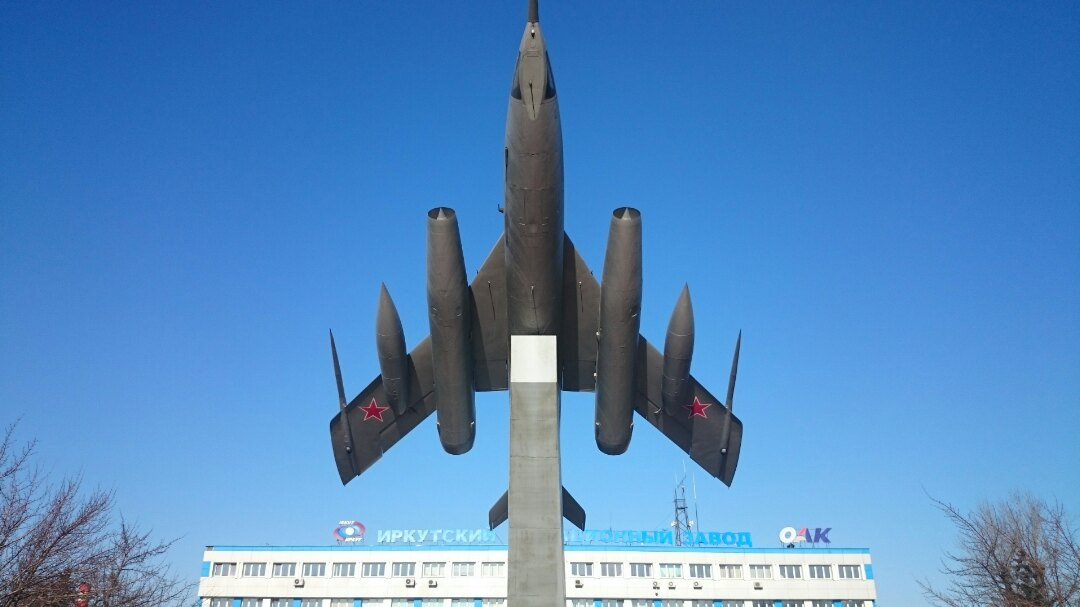
Yakovlev Yak-28P gate guardian at Irkutsk.

Data from

General characteristics

- Crew: 2
- Length: 21.6 m (70 ft 10 in)
- Wingspan: 12.5 m (41 ft 0 in)
- Height: 3.95 m (13 ft 0 in)
- Wing area: 37.6 m^{2} (405 sq ft)
- Empty weight: 9,970 kg (21,980 lb)
- Gross weight: 15,000 kg (33,069 lb)
- Max takeoff weight: 20,000 kg (44,092 lb)
- Powerplant: 2 × Tumansky R-11 afterburning turbojet engines, 46 kN (10,000 lbf) thrust each dry, 62 kN (14,000 lbf) with afterburner

Performance

- Maximum speed: 1,840 km/h (1,140 mph, 990 kn)
- Range: 2,500 km (1,600 mi, 1,300 nmi)
- Service ceiling: 16,750 m (54,950 ft)
- Wing loading: 531 kg/m^{2} (109 lb/sq ft)
- Thrust/weight: 0.62

Armament

- Air-to-air Missiles:
  - 2 × R-98M (AA-3 'Anab'), usually one R-98TM infrared and one R-98RM semi-active radar homing
  - 2 × K-13A (AA-2 'Atoll') short-range missiles (occasionally fitted)

== See also ==
Related development

- Yakovlev Yak-25
- Yakovlev Yak-27

Aircraft of comparable role, configuration, and era

- Blackburn Buccaneer
- Douglas A3D Skywarrior
- Douglas B-66 Destroyer
- McDonnell F-101 Voodoo
- Sud Aviation Vautour

== Bibliography ==
- Durie, William (2012). The British Garrison Berlin 1945 - 1994: nowhere to go ... a pictorial historiography of the British Military occupation / presence in Berlin. Berlin: Vergangenheitsverlag (de). ISBN 978-3-86408-068-5. OCLC 978161722.
- Taghvaee, Babak (2018). "The Soviet SAM-Jammer: The Yakolev Yak-28PP Brewer-E in Soviet Union and Ukrainian Service, 1970–2004". The Aviation Historian (25): 34–42. ISSN 2051-1930.
- Taylor, John W. R., ed. Jane's All The World's Aircraft 1976–77. London: Macdonald and Jane's, 1976. ISBN 978-0-53103-260-2.
