= Supersonic aircraft =

Aircraft that travels faster than the speed of sound

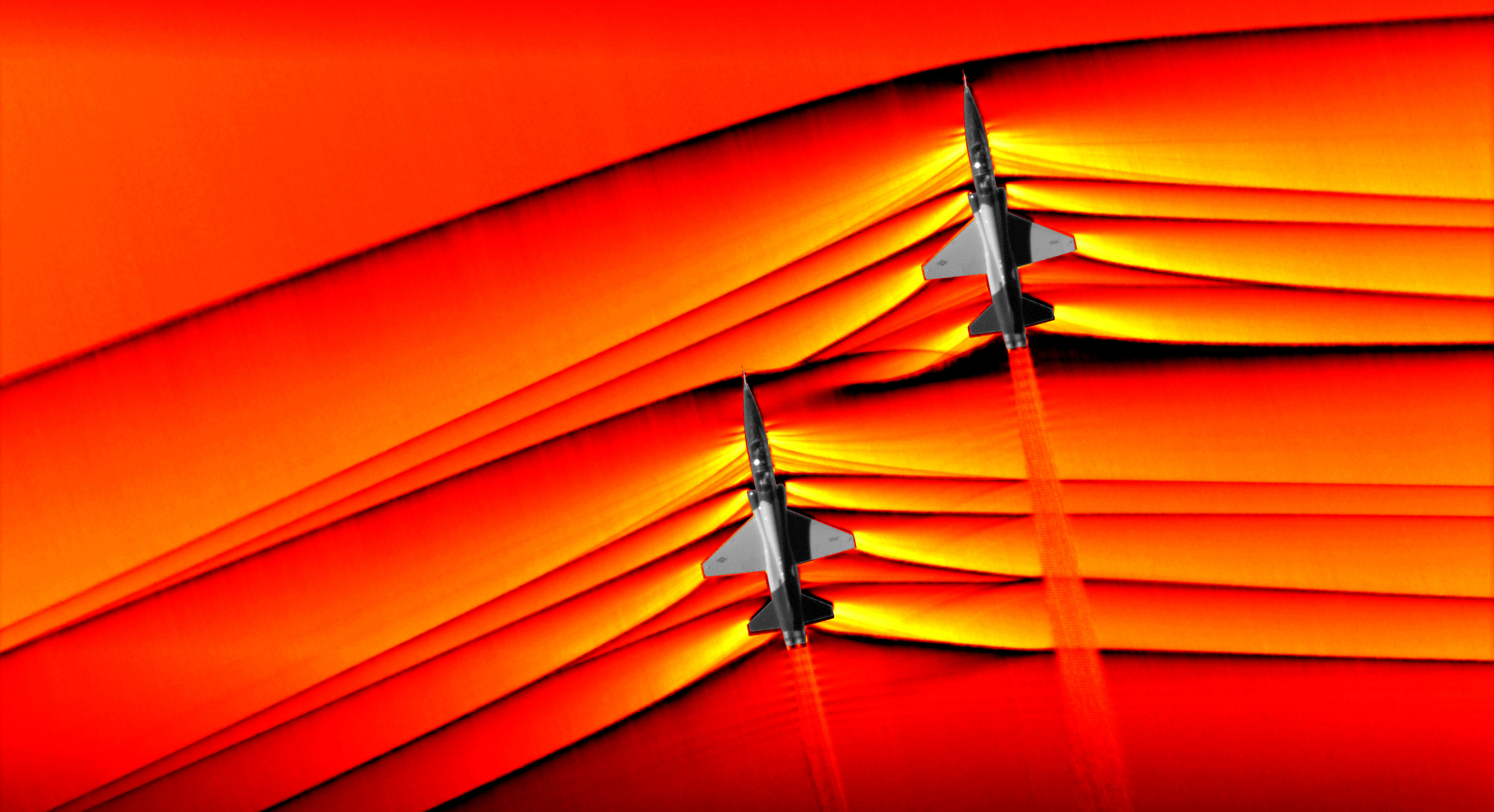
The interaction of shock waves from two supersonic aircraft, photographed for the first time by NASA using the Schlieren method in 2019.

A supersonic aircraft is an aircraft capable of supersonic flight, that is, flying faster than the speed of sound (Mach 1). Supersonic aircraft were developed in the second half of the twentieth century. Supersonic aircraft have been used for research and military purposes; however, to date, only two supersonic aircraft, the Tupolev Tu-144 (first flown on December 31, 1968) and the Concorde (first flown on March 2, 1969), have ever entered civilian service, both commercially used as supersonic passenger airliners. Fighter jets are the most common example of supersonic aircraft.

The aerodynamics of supersonic flight is called compressible flow because of the compression associated with the shock waves or "sonic boom" created by any object traveling faster than the speed of sound.

Aircraft flying at speeds above Mach 5 are called hypersonic aircraft. Supersonic speed is defined relative to air speed; higher speeds can be achieved in terms of ground speed when flying in the same direction as fast-moving winds such as the jet stream.

== History ==
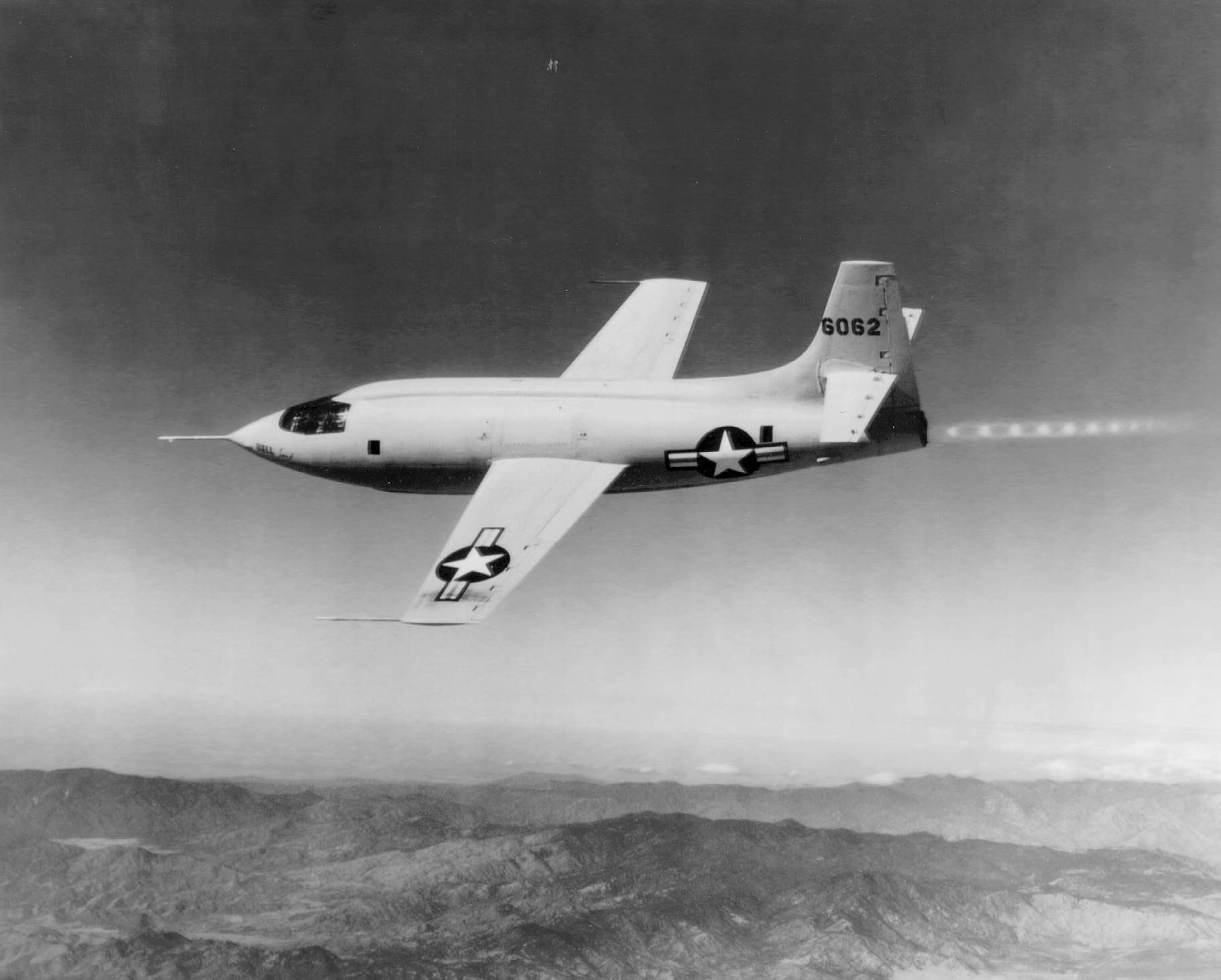
Bell X-1

The first aircraft to achieve supersonic speed during its flight was the American Bell X-1 experimental plane, which was powered by a 6,000-pound (2,700 kg) thrust rocket powered by liquid oxygen and ethyl alcohol. Most supersonic aircraft have been military or experimental aircraft.

Aviation research during World War II led to the creation of the first rocket- and jet-powered aircraft. Several claims of breaking the sound barrier during the war subsequently emerged. However, the first recognized flight exceeding the speed of sound by a crewed aircraft in controlled level flight was performed on October 14, 1947 by the experimental Bell X-1 research rocket plane piloted by Chuck Yeager. Moreover, the first aircraft to break the sound barrier with a female pilot was an F-86 Canadair Sabre with Jacqueline Cochran at the controls. According to David Masters, the DFS 346 prototype captured in Germany by the Soviets, after being released from a Boeing B-29 Superfortress heavy bomber at 32800 ft (10000 m), reached 683 mph (1100 km/h) late in 1951, which would have exceeded Mach 1 at that height. The pilot in these flights was the German Wolfgang Ziese.

On August 21, 1961, a Douglas DC-8-43 (registration N9604Z) exceeded Mach 1 in a controlled dive during a test flight at Edwards Air Force Base. The crew was composed of the following members: William Magruder (pilot), Paul Patten (copilot), Joseph Tomich (flight engineer), and Richard H. Edwards (flight test engineer). This was the first intentional supersonic flight by a civilian airliner, and the only one ever performed by a civilian airliner other than the Concorde or Tu-144.

In the 1960s and 1970s, multiple design studies for supersonic airliners were conducted and eventually two types entered service, the Soviet Tupolev Tu-144 (1968) and Anglo-French Concorde (1969). However, political, environmental, and economic obstacles, alongside one fatal Concorde crash, eventually prevented them from being utilized to their full commercial potential.

== Design principles ==
Supersonic flight has always presented substantial technical challenges to engineers, as the aerodynamics of supersonic flight are dramatically different from those of subsonic flight (i.e., flight at speeds slower than that of sound). In particular, aerodynamic drag rises sharply as the aircraft passes the transonic regime, requiring much greater engine power and more streamlined airframes.

=== Wings ===
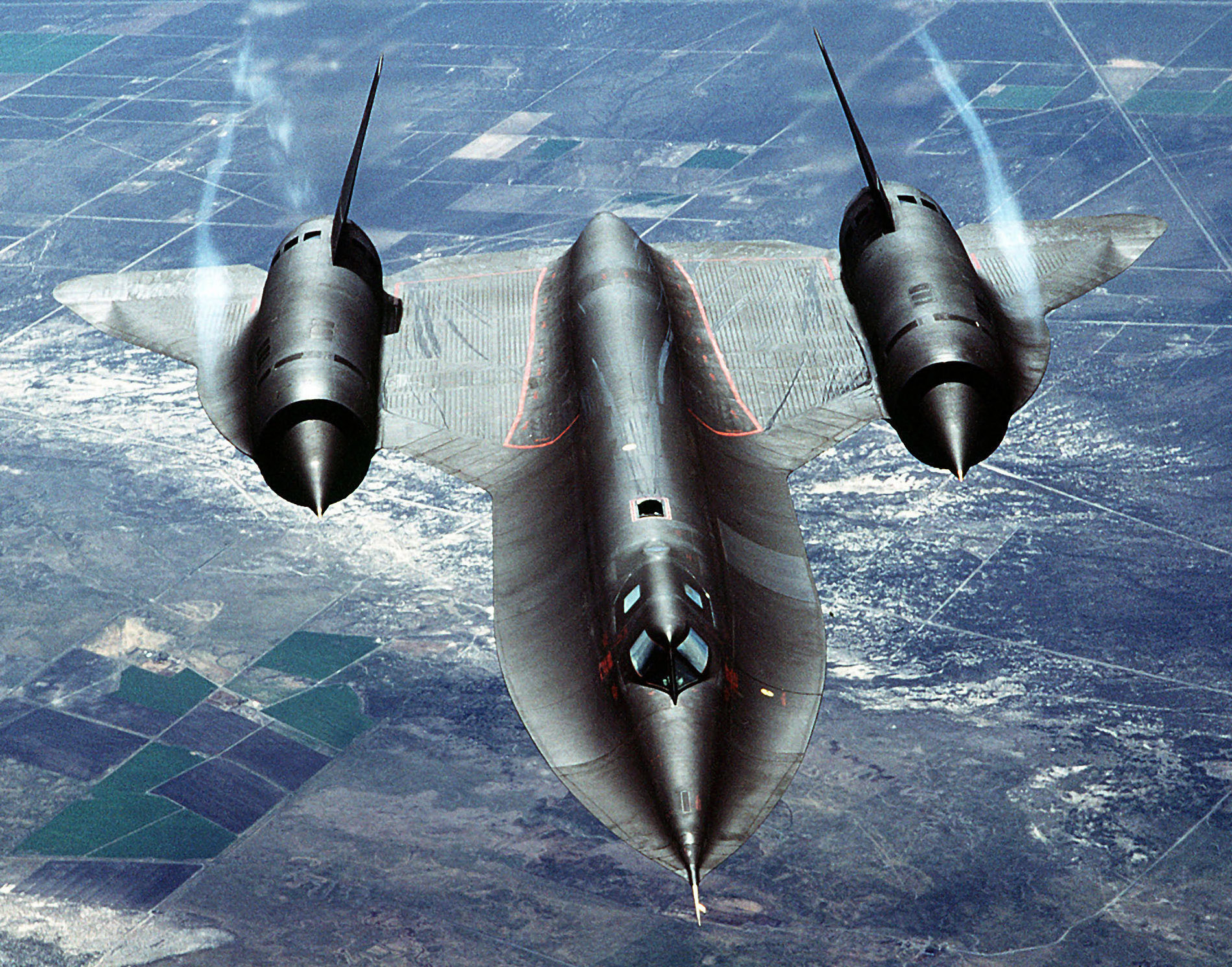
A Lockheed SR-71 Blackbird supersonic reconnaissance aircraft

To optimize drag, wingspan must be limited, which also reduces aerodynamic efficiency during subsonic flight, including takeoff and landing. Minimizing wave drag is a crucial aspect of wing design. Since a supersonic aircraft must also take off and land at a relatively slow speed, its aerodynamic design must be a compromise between the requirements for both ends of the speed range.

One approach to resolving this compromise is the use of a variable-geometry wing, commonly known as the "swing-wing," which spreads wide for low-speed flight and then sweeps sharply, usually backwards, for supersonic flight. However, swinging affects the longitudinal trim of the aircraft, and the swinging mechanism adds weight and cost. Use of a delta wing, such as those used on the Concorde, generates a vortex which energises the flow on the upper surface of the wing at high speeds and attack angles, delaying flow separation, and giving the aircraft a very high stall angle. It also solves the issue of fluid compressibility at transonic and supersonic speeds. However, it is, of course, inefficient at lower speeds due to the requirement of a high angle of attack, and therefore requires the use of flaps.

=== Heating ===
Another problem is the heat generated due to air compression as well as friction as the air flows over the aircraft. Most subsonic designs use aluminium alloys such as Duralumin, which are cheap and easy to work with but lose their strength quickly at high temperatures. This limits the maximum speed to approximately Mach 2.2.

Most supersonic aircraft, including many military fighter aircraft, are designed to spend most of their flight at subsonic speeds, and only to exceed the speed of sound for short periods such as when intercepting an enemy aircraft. A smaller number, such as the Lockheed SR-71 Blackbird reconnaissance aircraft and the Concorde supersonic airliner, have been designed to cruise continuously at speeds above the speed of sound, and with these designs the problems of supersonic flight are more severe.

=== Engines ===
Some early supersonic aircraft, including the first, relied on rocket power to provide the necessary thrust, although rockets burn a lot of fuel and so flight times were short. Early turbojets were more fuel-efficient but did not have enough thrust and some experimental aircraft were fitted with both a turbojet for low-speed flight and a rocket engine for supersonic flight. The invention of the afterburner, in which extra fuel is burned in the jet exhaust, made these mixed powerplant types obsolete. The turbofan engine passes additional cold air around the engine core, further increasing its fuel efficiency, and supersonic aircraft today are powered by turbofans fitted with afterburners.

Supersonic aircraft usually use low-bypass turbofans as they have acceptable efficiency below the speed of sound as well as above; or if supercruise is needed turbojet engines may be desirable as they give less nacelle drag at supersonic speeds. The Pratt & Whitney J58 engines of the Lockheed SR-71 Blackbird operated in 2 ways, taking off and landing as turbojets with no bypass, but bypassing some of the compressor air to the afterburner at higher speeds. This allowed the Blackbird to fly at over Mach 3, faster than any other production aircraft. The heating effect of air friction at these speeds meant that a special fuel had to be developed which did not break down in the heat and clog the fuel pipes on its way to the burner.

Another high-speed powerplant is the ramjet. This needs to be flying fairly fast before it will work at all.

=== Supersonic flight ===
Subsonic aerodynamics is simpler than Supersonic aerodynamics because the airsheets at different points along the plane often cannot affect each other in subsonic flight. Supersonic jets and rocket vehicles require several times greater thrust to push through the extra aerodynamic drag experienced within the transonic region (around Mach 0.85–1.2). At these speeds aerospace engineers can gently guide air around the fuselage of the aircraft without producing new shock waves, but any change in cross area farther down the vehicle leads to shock waves along the body. Designers use the Whitcomb area rule to minimize sudden changes in size.

The sound source has now broken through the sound speed barrier, and is traveling at 1.4 times the speed of sound, c (Mach 1.4). Because the source is moving faster than the sound waves it creates, it actually leads the advancing wavefront. The sound source will pass by a stationary observer before the observer actually hears the sound it creates.

Conical shockwave with its hyperbola-shaped ground contact zone in yellow

However, in practical applications, a supersonic aircraft must operate stably in both subsonic and supersonic profiles, hence aerodynamic design is more complex.

One problem with sustained supersonic flight is the generation of heat in flight. At high speeds aerodynamic heating can occur, so an aircraft must be designed to operate and function under very high temperatures. Duralumin, a material traditionally used in aircraft manufacturing, starts to lose strength and deform at relatively low temperatures, and is unsuitable for continuous use at speeds above Mach 2.2 to 2.4. Materials such as titanium and stainless steel allow operations at much higher temperatures. For example, the Lockheed SR-71 Blackbird jet could fly continuously at Mach 3.1 which could lead to temperatures on some parts of the aircraft reaching above 315 °C (600 °F).

Another area of concern for sustained high-speed flight is engine operation. Jet engines create thrust by increasing the temperature of the air they ingest, and as the aircraft speeds up, the compression process in the intake causes a temperature rise before it reaches the engines. The maximum allowable temperature of the exhaust is determined by the materials in the turbine at the rear of the engine, so as the aircraft speeds up, the difference in intake and exhaust temperature that the engine can create, by burning fuel, decreases, as does the thrust. The higher thrust needed for supersonic speeds had to be regained by burning extra fuel in the exhaust.

Intake design was also a major issue. As much of the available energy in the incoming air has to be recovered, known as intake recovery, using shock waves in the supersonic compression process in the intake. At supersonic speeds the intake has to make sure that the air slows down without excessive pressure loss. It has to use the correct type of shock waves, oblique/plane, for the aircraft design speed to compress and slow the air to subsonic speed before it reaches the engine. The shock waves are positioned using a ramp or cone which may need to be adjustable depending on trade-offs between complexity and the required aircraft performance.

An aircraft able to operate for extended periods at supersonic speeds has a potential range advantage over a similar design operating subsonically. Additionally, most of the drag an aircraft sees while speeding up to supersonic speeds occurs just below the speed of sound, due to an aerodynamic effect known as wave drag. An aircraft that can accelerate past this speed sees a significant drag decrease, and can fly supersonically with improved fuel economy. However, due to the way lift is generated supersonically, the lift-to-drag ratio of the aircraft as a whole drops, leading to lower range, offsetting or overturning this advantage.

The key to having low supersonic drag is to properly shape the overall aircraft to be long and thin, and close to a "perfect" shape, the von Karman ogive or Sears-Haack body. This has led to almost every supersonic cruising aircraft looking very similar to every other, with a very long and slender fuselage and large delta wings, cf. SR-71, Concorde, etc. Although not ideal for passenger aircraft, this shaping is quite adaptable for bomber use.

=== Transonic flight ===
Transonic flow patterns on an airfoil showing flow patterns at and above critical Mach number

Airflow can speed up or slow down locally at different points over an aircraft. In the region around Mach 1, some areas may experience supersonic flow while others are subsonic. This regime is called transonic flight. As the aircraft speed changes, pressure waves will form or move around. This can affect the trim, stability and controllability of the aircraft, and the aircraft will experience higher drag than subsonic or fully supersonic speeds. The designer needs to ensure that these effects are taken into account at all speeds.

=== Hypersonic flight ===
Flight at speeds above about Mach 5 is often referred to as hypersonic. In this region the problems of drag and heating are even more acute. It is difficult to make materials which can stand the forces and temperatures generated by air resistance at these speeds.

=== Sonic boom ===
The sound source is travelling at 1.4 times the speed of sound (Mach 1.4). Since the source is moving faster than the sound waves it creates, it leads the advancing wavefront.

A sonic boom produced by an aircraft moving at M=2.92, calculated from the cone angle of 20 degrees. An observer hears nothing until the shock wave, on the edges of the cone, crosses their location.

Mach cone angle

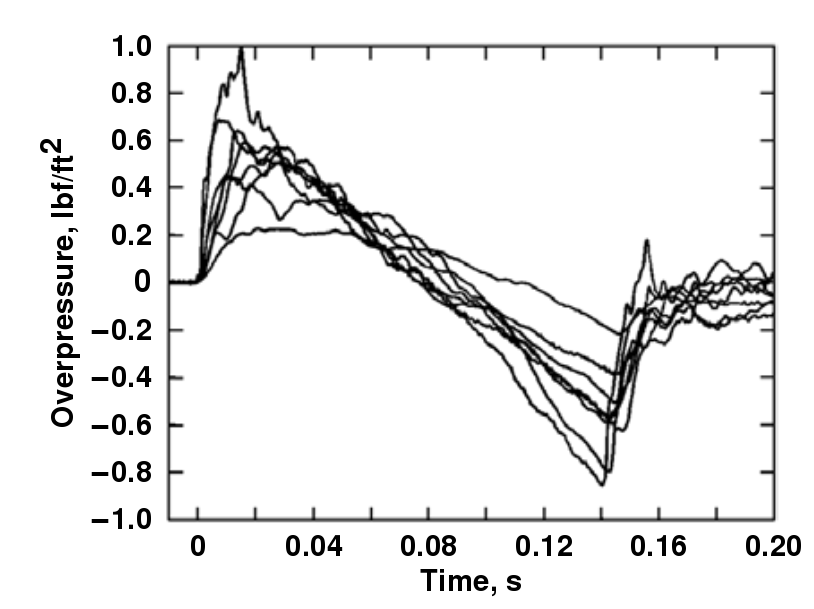
NASA data showing N-wave signature.

A sonic boom is the sound associated with the shock waves created whenever an object traveling through the air travels faster than the speed of sound. Sonic booms generate significant amounts of sound energy, sounding similar to an explosion or a thunderclap to the human ear. The crack of a supersonic bullet passing overhead or the crack of a bullwhip are examples of a sonic boom in miniature.

Sonic booms due to large supersonic aircraft can be particularly loud and startling, tend to awaken people, and may cause minor damage to some structures. Eventually, they led to prohibition of routine supersonic flight over land. Although they cannot be completely prevented, research suggests that with careful shaping of the vehicle the nuisance due to them may be reduced to the point that overland supersonic flight may become a practical option.

=== Supercruise ===
Supercruise is sustained supersonic flight of a supersonic aircraft with a useful cargo, passenger, or weapons load performed efficiently, which typically precludes the use of highly inefficient afterburners or "reheat". Many well known supersonic military aircraft not capable of supercruise can only maintain Mach 1+ flight in short bursts, typically with afterburners. Aircraft such as the SR-71 Blackbird are designed to cruise at supersonic speed with afterburners enabled.

One of the best known examples of an aircraft capable of supercruise was Concorde. Due to its long service as a commercial airliner, Concorde holds the record for the most time spent in supercruise; more than all other aircraft combined.

== Supersonic transport ==
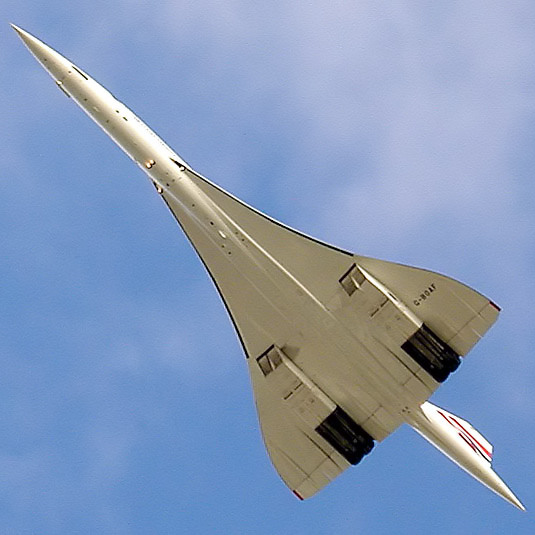
The fuselage of Concorde had an extremely high fineness ratio.

A supersonic transport (SST) is a civil aircraft designed to transport passengers at speeds greater than the speed of sound. The only supersonic civilian aircraft to see service were the Soviet produced Tupolev Tu-144 which first flew in 1968 and last transported passengers in 1978, with NASA retiring it from any use in 1997; and the Franco-British produced Concorde, which first flew in 1969 and remained in service until 2003. Since 2003, there have been no supersonic civilian aircraft in service.

A key feature of these designs is the ability to maintain supersonic cruise for long periods, so low drag is essential to limit fuel consumption to a practical and economic level. As a consequence, these airframes are highly streamlined and the wings have a very short span. The requirement for low speeds when taking off and landing is met by using vortex lift: as the aircraft slows, lift must be restored by raising the nose to increase the angle of attack of the wing. The sharply swept leading edge causes the air to twist as it flows over the wing, speeding up the airflow locally and maintaining lift.

Other SST projects have included:

- France – Sud Aviation Super-Caravelle
- Russia-United States – Sukhoi-Gulfstream S-21
- Soviet Union – Tupolev Tu-244, Tupolev Tu-444
- United Kingdom – Bristol Type 223
- United States – Convair Model 58-9, Boeing 2707, Lockheed L-2000, Douglas 2229, SAI Quiet Supersonic Transport, High Speed Civil Transport

=== Supersonic business jet ===
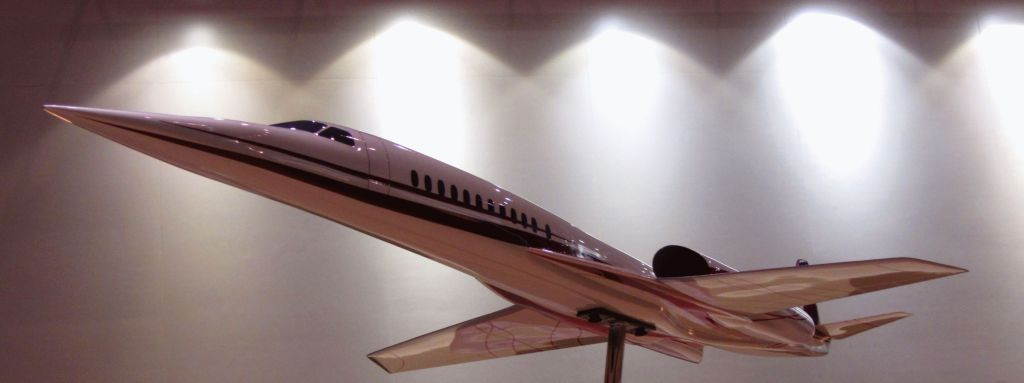
Aerion SBJ model

Supersonic business jets (SSBJ) are a proposed class of small supersonic aircraft. None have yet flown.

Typically intended to transport about ten passengers, SSBJs are about the same size as traditional subsonic business jets.

Projects for both large-scale and business jet (see lower) passenger supersonic and hypersonic airliners (Aerion SBJ, Spike S-512, HyperMach SonicStar, Next Generation Supersonic Transport, Tupolev Tu-444, Gulfstream X-54, LAPCAT, Reaction Engines LAPCAT A2, Zero Emission Hyper Sonic Transport, SpaceLiner, etc.) were proposed and now are under development.

== Supersonic strategic bombers ==
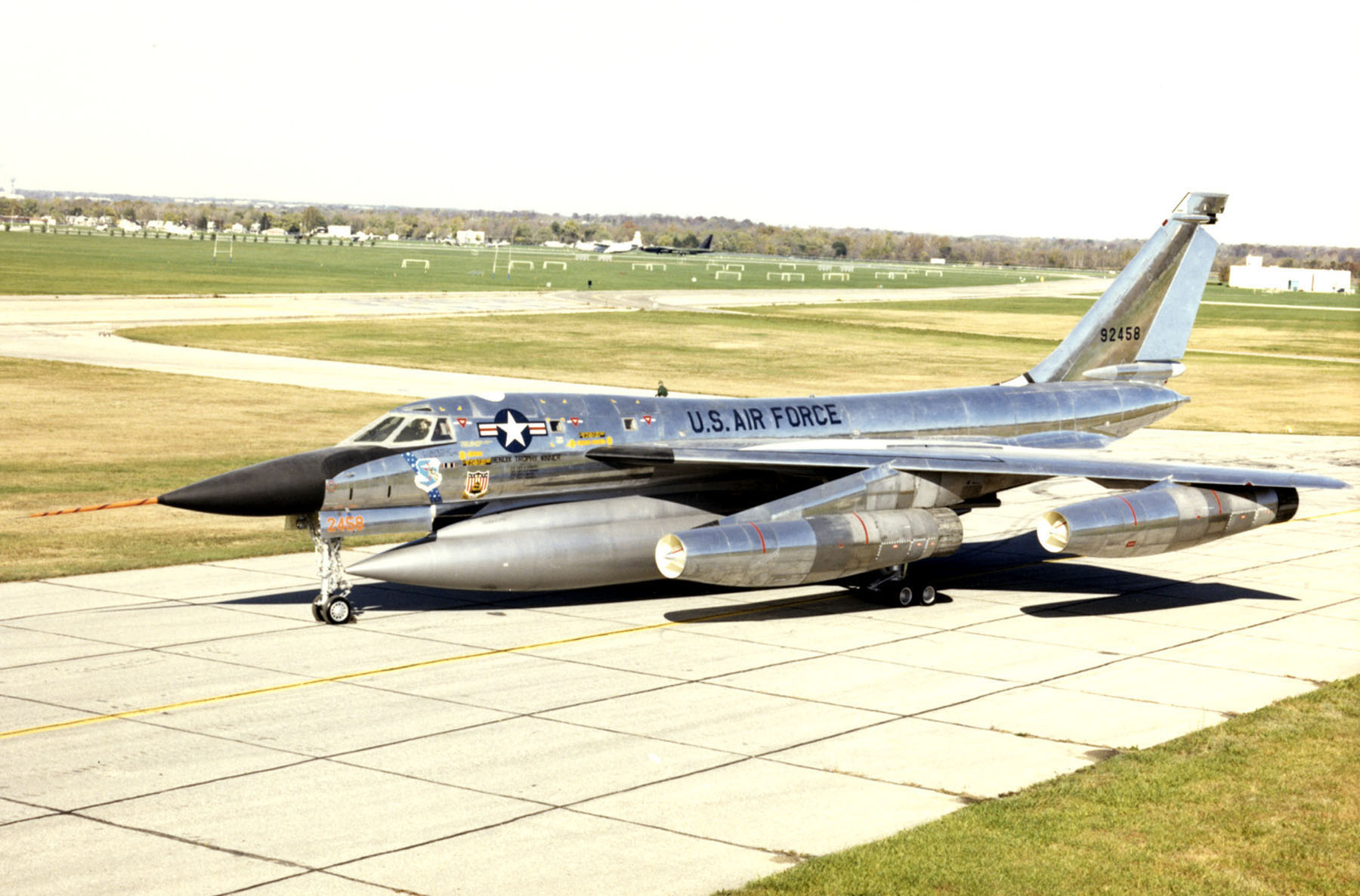
Convair B-58A Hustler

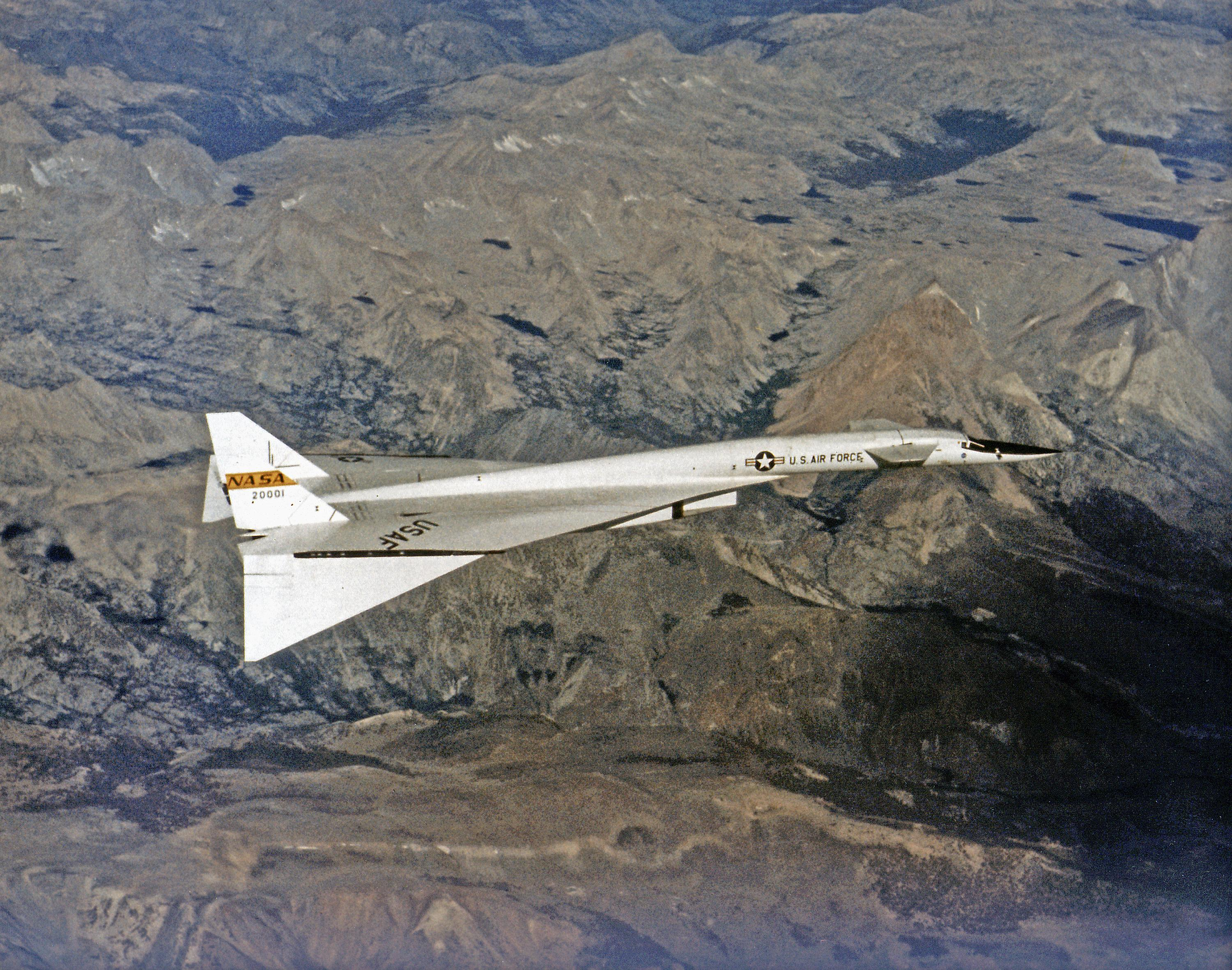
XB-70 Valkyrie

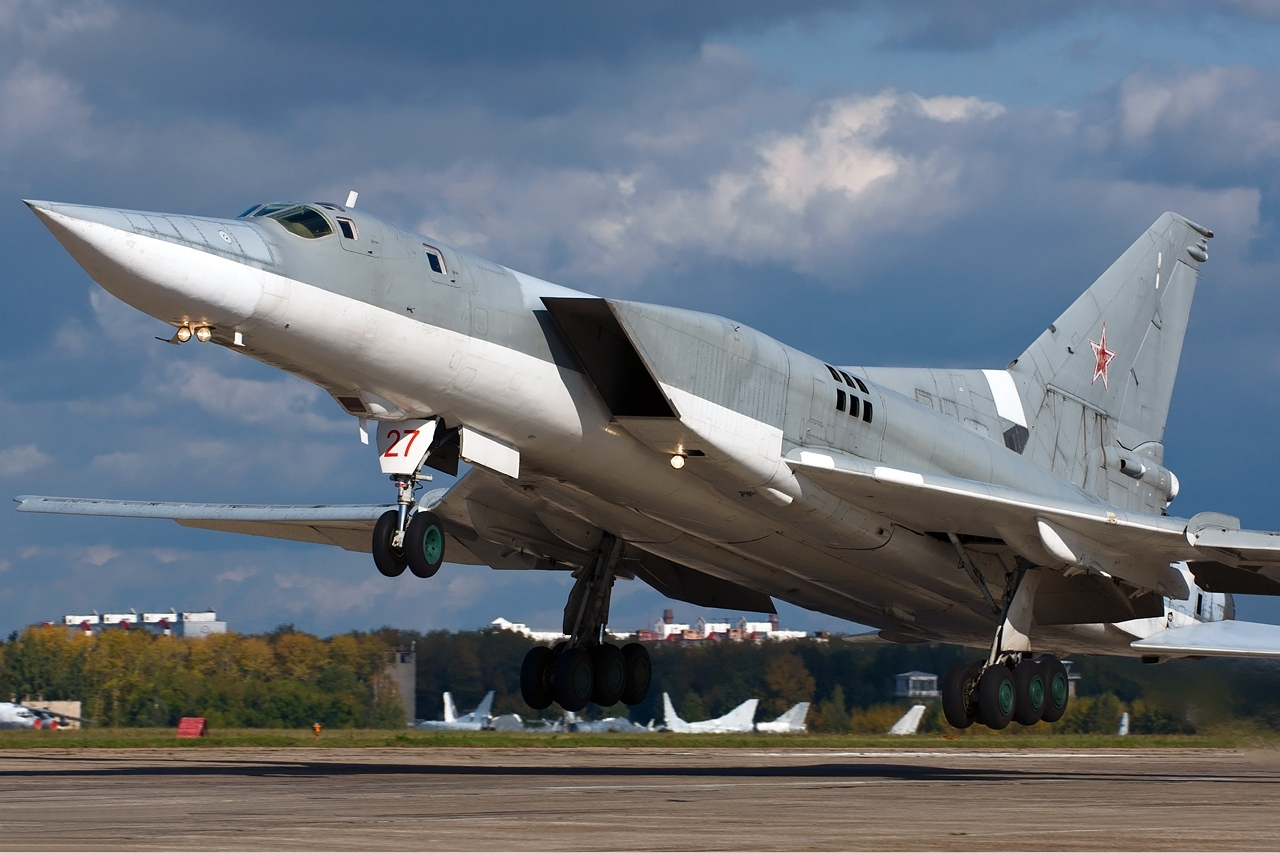
Tupolev Tu-22M3

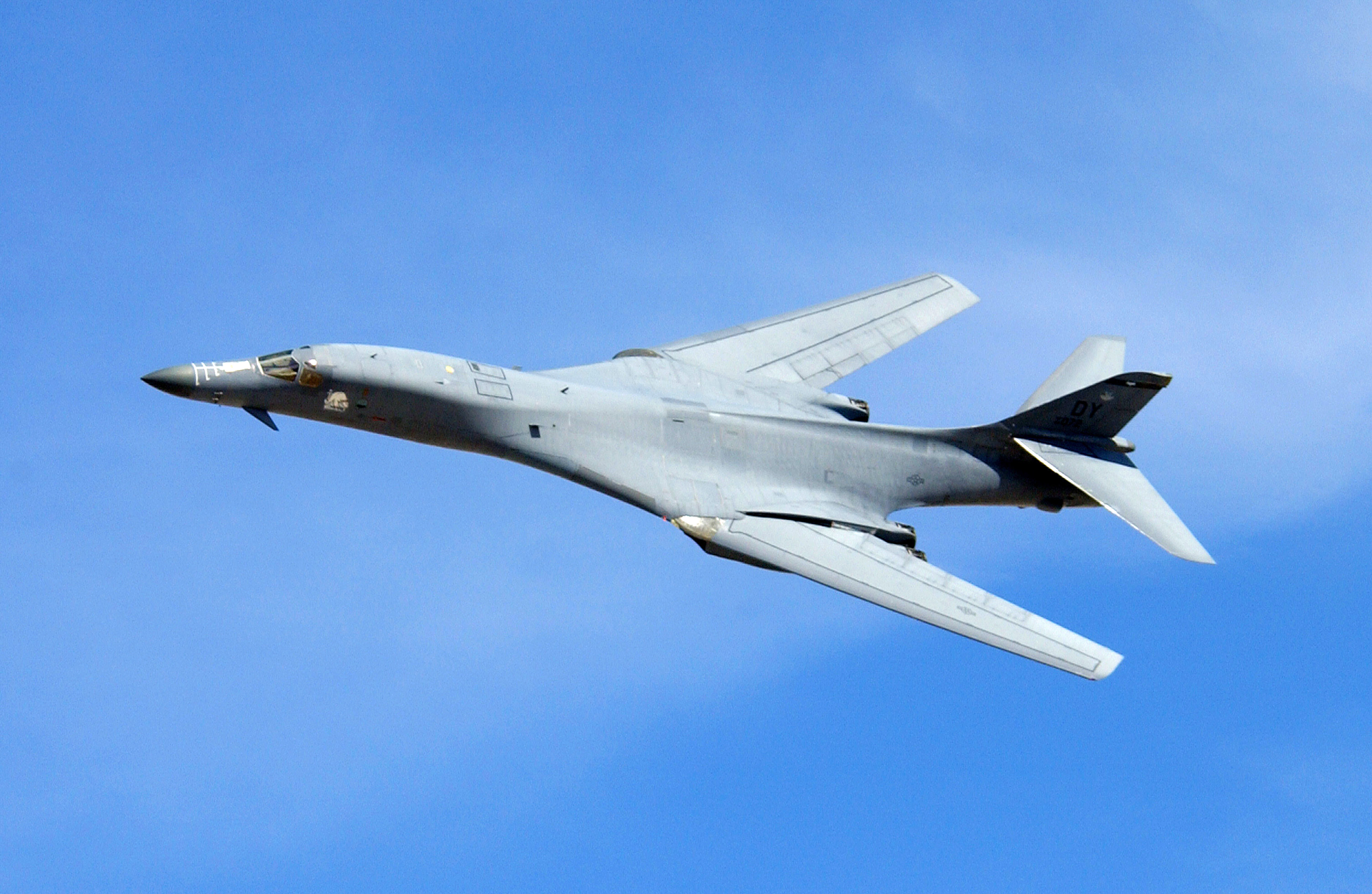
B-1B Lancer

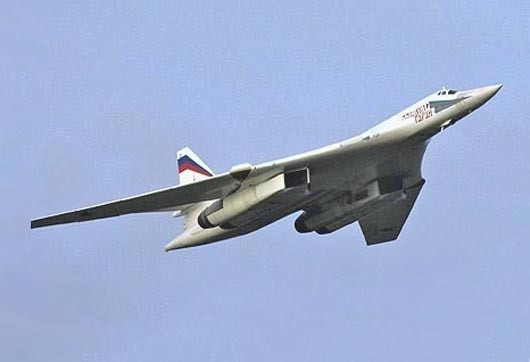
Tupolev Tu-160

A strategic bomber must carry a large bomb load over long distances. Consequently, it is a large aircraft typically with an empty weight exceeding 25,000 kg. Some have also been designed for related roles such as strategic reconnaissance and anti-shipping strike.

Typically the aircraft will cruise subsonically for most of its flight to conserve fuel, before accelerating to supersonic speed for its bombing run.

Few supersonic strategic bombers have entered service. The earliest type, the Convair B-58 Hustler, first flew in 1956 and the most recent, the Rockwell B-1B Lancer, in 1983. Although this and a few other types are still in service today, none remains in production.

Types to have flown include:

- Convair B-58 Hustler (1956) (USA)
- Dassault Mirage IV (1959) (France)
- Tupolev Tu-22 (1959) (USSR)
- General Dynamics F-111 Aardvark (1964) (USA)
- Tupolev Tu-22M (1969) (USSR)
- Rockwell B-1 Lancer (1974) (USA)
- Tupolev Tu-160 (1981) (USSR)

== Supersonic strategic reconnaissance ==
Some supersonic strategic bombers, such as the Sukhoi T-4 are also capable of the reconnaissance role (although the Sukhoi remained a prototype).

The Lockheed SR-71 Blackbird was specifically designed for the role, and was a larger development of the Lockheed A-12 reconnaissance aircraft which first flew in 1962.

== Supersonic fighter/attack jets ==
Supersonic fighters and related aircraft are sometimes called fast jets. They make up the overwhelming majority of supersonic aircraft and some, such as the Mikoyan-Gurevich MiG-21, Lockheed F-104 Starfighter and Dassault Mirage III, have been produced in large numbers.

Many military supersonic fighters and similar aircraft of fourth- and fifth- generations are under development in several countries, including Russia, China, Japan, South Korea, India, Iran and the United States.

=== United States ===
- Douglas F4D Skyray (1951)
- North American F-100 Super Sabre (1953)
- Convair F-102 Delta Dagger (1953)
- Grumman F-11 Tiger (1954)
- McDonnell F-101 Voodoo (1954)
- Lockheed F-104 Starfighter (1954)
- Republic F-105 Thunderchief (1955)
- Vought F-8 Crusader (1955)
- Convair F-106 Delta Dart (1956)
- North American A-5 Vigilante (1958)
- McDonnell Douglas F-4 Phantom II (1958)
- Northrop F-5A/B Freedom Fighter (1959)
- Northrop T-38 Talon (1959)
- General Dynamics–Grumman F-111B (1965)
- Grumman F-14 Tomcat (1970)
- McDonnell Douglas F-15 Eagle (1972)
- General Dynamics F-16 Fighting Falcon (1974)
- McDonnell Douglas F/A-18 Hornet (1978)
- McDonnell Douglas F-15E Strike Eagle (1986)
- Boeing F/A-18E/F Super Hornet (1995)
- Lockheed Martin F-22 Raptor (1997)
- Lockheed Martin F-35 Lightning II (2006)

=== Soviet Union/Russia ===
- Mikoyan-Gurevich MiG-19 (1953)
- Mikoyan-Gurevich MiG-21 (1955)
- Sukhoi Su-7 (1955)
- Sukhoi Su-9 (1956)
- Sukhoi Su-11 (1958)
- Yakovlev Yak-28 (1958)
- Yakovlev Yak-27 (1960)
- Tupolev Tu-28 (1961)
- Sukhoi Su-15 (1962)
- Mikoyan-Gurevich MiG-25 (1964)
- Sukhoi Su-17 (1966)
- Sukhoi Su-24 (1967)
- Mikoyan-Gurevich MiG-23 (1967)
- Mikoyan MiG-27(1970)
- Yakovlev Yak-38 (1971)
- Mikoyan MiG-31 (1975)
- Sukhoi Su-27 (1977)
- Mikoyan MiG-29 (1977)
- Sukhoi Su-33 (1987)
- Sukhoi Su-30 (1989)
- Sukhoi Su-34 (1990)
- Mikoyan MiG-35 (2007)
- Sukhoi Su-35 (2008)
- Sukhoi Su-57 (2010)

=== China ===
- Shenyang J-6 Farmer (1958)
- Nanchang Q-5 Fantan (1965)
- Chengdu J-7 Fishbed (1966)
- Shenyang J-8 (1969)
- Xian JH-7 Flounder (1988)
- Chengdu J-10 Vigorous Dragon (1998)
- Shenyang J-11 (1998)
- Nanchang/Hongdu L-15 (2005)
- Shenyang J-15 Flying Shark (2009)
- Chengdu J-20 stealth (2011)
- Shenyang J-16 (2012)

=== France ===
- Dassault Super Mystère B1 (1955)
- Dassault Mirage III (1956)
- Dassault Mirage F1 (1966)
- Dassault Mirage 5 (1967)
- Dassault-Breguet Super Étendard (1974)
- Dassault Mirage 2000 (1978)
- Dassault Rafale (1986)

=== Sweden ===
- Saab 32 Lansen (1952)
- Saab 35 Draken (1955)
- Saab 37 Viggen (1967)
- Saab JAS 39 Gripen (1988)

=== Iran ===
- HESA Azarakhsh (1997)
- HESA Saeqeh (2004)
- IAIO Qaher-313 (2013)

=== Japan ===
- Mitsubishi T-2 (1971)
- Mitsubishi F-1 (1975)
- Mitsubishi F-2 (1995)

=== India ===
- HAL HF-24 Marut (1961)
- HAL Tejas (2001)

=== Israel ===
- IAI Nesher (1971)
- IAI Kfir (1973)

=== South Korea ===
- KAI T-50 Golden Eagle (2002)
- KAI KF-21 Boramae (2022)

=== United Kingdom ===
- English Electric Lightning (1954)

=== Egypt ===
- Helwan HA-300 (1964)

=== France/United Kingdom ===
- SEPECAT Jaguar (1968)

=== Germany/Italy/United Kingdom ===
- Panavia Tornado (1974)

=== Germany/Italy/Spain/United Kingdom ===
- Eurofighter Typhoon (1994)

=== Pakistan ===
- PAC JF-17 Thunder (2003)

=== South Africa ===
- Atlas Cheetah (1986)

=== Taiwan ===
- AIDC F-CK-1 Ching-kuo (1989)

== Supersonic research aircraft ==
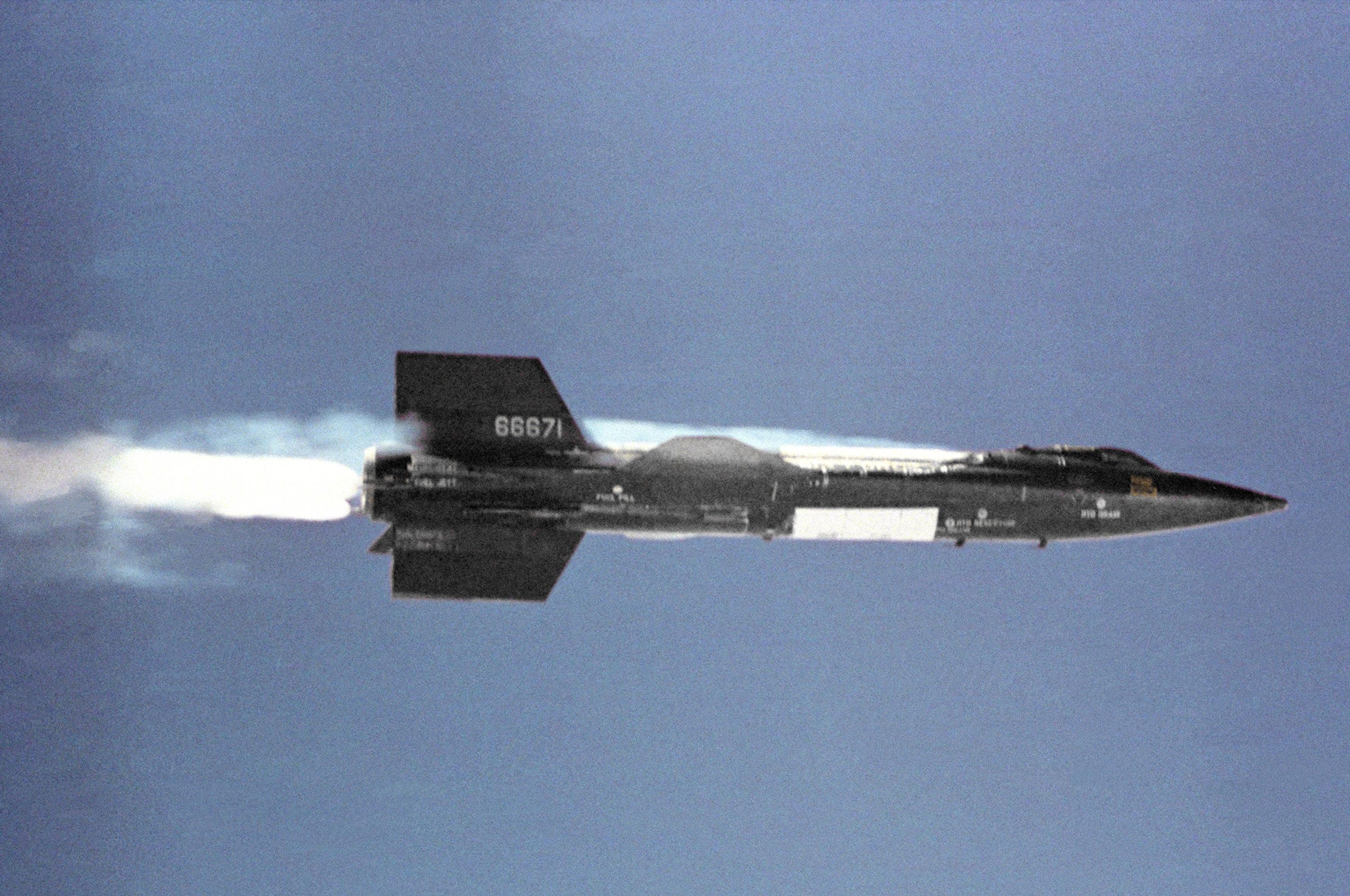
North American X-15

- Bell X-1 (1946) (USA), first to break the sound barrier in level flight. Rocket powered.
- Douglas D-558-2 Skyrocket (1948) (USA), Rocket powered.
- Convair XF-92 (1948) (USA), First delta-wing supersonic jet.
- Republic XF-91 Thunderceptor (1949) (USA), mixed power
- Mikoyan-Gurevich I-350 (1951) (USSR), It was the first Soviet aircraft able to maintain supersonic speed.
- Bell X-2 (1952) (USA), Rocket powered.
- Convair F2Y Sea Dart (1953) (USA), only seaplane to exceed speed of sound
- SNCASO Trident (1953) (France), French supersonic twin engine research aircraft.
- Fairey Delta 2 (1954) (UK), first to exceed 1,000 miles per hour.
- Nord Gerfaut (1954) (France), French built delta wing supersonic research aircraft.
- Nord 1500 Griffon (1955, 1957) (France), Griffon 1 flew in 1955, Griffon 2 flew in 1957, experimental mixed turbojet-ramjet fighter.
- SNCASE SE.212 Durandal (1956) (France), experimental French built delta wing supersonic fighter.
- Douglas F5D Skylancer (1956) (USA).
- Grumman F11F-1F Super Tiger (1956) (USA).
- North American F-107 (1956) (USA).
- Mikoyan-Gurevich I-3 (1956) (USSR), Jet fighter prototype.
- Sukhoi T-3 (1956) (USSR).
- Leduc 022 (1957) (France).
- Sukhoi P-1 (1957) (USSR).
- Mikoyan-Gurevich I-7 (1957) (USSR), Jet fighter prototype.
- Mikoyan-Gurevich I-75 (1957) (USSR), Jet fighter prototype.
- Saunders-Roe SR.53 (1957) (UK), experimental mixed power jet fighter.
- Avro Canada CF-105 Arrow (1958) (Canada).
- Vought XF8U-3 Crusader III (1958) (USA).
- North American X-15 (1959) (USA), first hypersonic aircraft and spaceplane. Rocket powered.
- Mikoyan-Gurevich Ye-150 family (1959, 1960, 1961) (USSR).
- Myasishchev M-50 (1959) (USSR).
- Sukhoi T-49 (1960) (USSR).
- Dassault Mirage III V (1961) (France).
- Bristol 188 (1962) (UK), British supersonic research aircraft.
- Mikoyan-Gurevich Ye-8 (1962) (USSR), Jet fighter prototype.
- Lockheed NF-104A (1963) (USA), Modified F-104 Starfighter used for training astronauts for North American X-15 and Boeing X-20 Dyna-Soar programs.
- Lockheed YF-12 (1963) (USA).
- EWR VJ 101 (1963) (Germany).
- BAC TSR-2 (1964) (UK).
- North American XB-70 Valkyrie (1964) (USA).
- Helwan HA-300 (1964) (Egypt).
- General Dynamics–Grumman F-111B (1965) (USA).
- Northrop HL-10 (1966) (USA), rocket powered.
- Martin Marietta X-24A (1969) (USA), rocket powered.
- Northrop M2-F3 (1970) (USA), rocket powered.
- Nanchang J-12 (1970) (China).
- Dassault Mirage G (1971) (France).
- Sukhoi T-4 (1972) (USSR).
- Northrop YF-17 (1974) (USA).
- Dassault Mirage 4000 (1979) (France).
- General Dynamics F-16XL (1982) (USA), modified F-16, delta wing test demonstrator
- Northrop F-20 Tigershark (1982) (USA).
- Grumman X-29 (1984) (USA).
- British Aerospace EAP (1986) (UK).
- IAI Lavi (1986) (Israel).
- Yakovlev Yak-141 (1987) (USSR).
- McDonnell Douglas F-15 STOL/MTD (1988) (USA), heavily modified F-15 used in several NASA test programs including, STOL/MTD, ACTIVE, IFCS, Quiet Spike, SBRDC/ECANS, and HISTEC.
- Vought YA-7F (1989) (USA).
- Lockheed YF-22 (1990) (USA).
- Northrop YF-23 (1990) (USA).
- Rockwell-MBB X-31 (1990) (USA).
- IAI Nammer (1991) (Israel).
- General Dynamics F-16 VISTA (1992) (USA), modified F-16, thrust vector control demonstrator.
- Sukhoi Su-37 (1996) (Russia).
- Sukhoi Su-47 (1997) (Russia).
- Mikoyan Project 1.44 (2000) (Russia).
- Lockheed Martin X-35 (2000) (USA).
- Boeing X-32 (2000) (USA).
- Shaped Sonic Boom Demonstration (2003) (USA).
- SpaceShipOne (2003) (USA), first privately designed space plane
- NASA X-43 (2004) (USA), scramjet powered demonstrator
- Boeing X-53 Active Aeroelastic Wing (2006) (USA), modified F-18, wing warping demonstrator. Was also used as the High Alpha Research Vehicle and more recent sonic boom research.
- Boeing X-51 Waverider (2010) (USA), scramjet powered demonstrator
- Shenyang J-21/J-31 Gyrfalcon (2012) (China).
- Lockheed Martin X-59 QueSST (2018) (USA), commissioned by NASA

== See also ==
- Sound barrier
