= Uragan Soviet automatic air defense interception system =

The Uragan-1 was the first generation of a Soviet automatic air defense interception system, and was a component of the Soviet Air Defence Forces protivovozdushnaya oborona strany (PVO Strany). The concept began with a Soviet Council of Ministers resolution dated February 26, 1955 and the Ministry of Aviation Industry order dated March 8, 1955. The resolutions were in response to the threat from long-range supersonic bombers such as the United States' Convair B-58 "Hustler" and the equally threatening British Vickers Valiant, among others. The current generation is the Uragan-5B.

== Background ==
During World War II, the Soviet Union relied primarily on visual and sound methods to detect intruding aircraft. Radar equipment and technology was available, but was available only in limited supply. As the war progressed, the Soviets received significant information on nearly all of the radars which were then in operation by the United States and Britain. Among the systems were the United States' SCR-584 fire control radar and the British Experimental Searchlight Control—SLC "Elsie" radar. Knowledge of these radars gave the Soviets a basis to produce their own radar systems.

In 1945 the Soviets recognized the urgency of developing a defense against a probable threat from Europe. American and British aircraft were the most likely and most immediate threat. An air defense system became a high priority for the U.S.S.R. when viewed in the context of Soviet military heritage. The Soviets knew that they would need an integrated early warning system to defend themselves from nuclear bombers then under development in the West, and wanted a system that integrated search, tracking and interception functions.

Before 1950, the Soviets produced the Pegmantit 3 (also known as the P-3), an acquisition radar based on foreign technology. The P-3 was referred to by the NATO reporting name "Dumbo" in the west). Dumbo was soon joined in 1949 by the Перископ НИИ-244 (Periscope RI-244), a purely Soviet-designed First Soviet microwave EW radar called Token and later Bar Lock by NATO. These radar sets were quickly produced and installed across the country. A number of other early warning radar systems were under development by 1950, and there was a significant increase in improving existing radar system designs between 1952 and 1955. Over time, Soviet research assimilated foreign technology, integrating these new concepts to their own designs.

By 1955, the early warning and detection system had nearly continuous coverage around the periphery of their entire country and Eastern Europe except for a few of the least vulnerable portions.

A contemporary U.S. Air Force evaluation Background Intelligence Data for Posture Statement on Strategic Initiatives which was released for public publication in AF/INAF 3 January 1975, revealed that:

By Western standards, the system performance was unimpressive
A greater number of radars were needed to give continuous coverage
The Soviet Union’s great size was an advantage, as it permitted radar detection far from the defended area
The system was relatively maintenance-free as it was built for simplicity
Mobility and easy concealability were highly prized features

The continued development of nuclear weapons drove the Soviets to develop a more effective air defense system, one that reduced the delay between detection and interception, and integrated anti-aircraft artillery, including missiles, into the existing interceptor plan, giving a layered network of increasing firepower as threats closed on their targets. This required a new radar system, high speed computers, and a communications system to move the data. The new system was nicknamed Uragan (Hurricane).

== Purpose ==
Overall, the Uragan series of air defense systems were intended to intercept enemy supersonic bombers flying at 40,000 – 60,000 feet within 40–60 miles of the strategic target.

The intercept system was intended to:

- perform automatic interceptor guidance
- allow an on-board pilot to perform the interception manually
- attack the threat at the greatest distance possible
- withdrawal from the attack
- return the aircraft to its base

== Components ==
The overall defense system consisted of:

- a number of ground radar stations (each with a detection range of 345 km)
- a digital control computer to plot targets and calculate an intercept course
- a "SAZO" IFF system to identify the interceptor's radar return
- a "SPK" command data link to connect the ground and air portions of the system
- a number of ground-based automatic guidance transmitters located around strategic targets
- a number of interceptor type-fighters equipped with "SRP" Almaz airborne radar with a detection range of 25 km, an autopilot and a computer for final intercept and weapon delivery.

The Soviet military sent a number of interceptor aircraft specifications to the design bureaus for proposals. These proposals produced families of similar designs from each bureau, including prototypes, armed and reconnaissance variants. Only a few of these projects were known in the west, and many were never discovered at all, as only a few of each were produced, and they were often recycled into later variants.

Examples of this process is a series of aircraft intended for the Uragan project developed by the Mikoyan-Gurevich Design Bureau. The Mikoyan-Gurevich I-3U became the I-7U when the proposed engine was canceled. An armament change resulted in the I-7K, and after a landing incident, the I-7K became the Mikoyan-Gurevich I-75 after it was rebuilt. The I-3/7/75 design progressed as the Ye-6, later becoming the Ye-50P and ultimately the Mikoyan-Gurevich MiG-21F. The Sukhoi design bureau also produced a series of experimental aircraft for the Uragan program. Among them are the Sukhoi P-1, T-3, T-405, Su-9, Su-9U, T-431 and finally Su-11. Similar designs were proposed by Yakovlev and Lavochkin.

The Uragan system enabled the intercept and downing of a number of intruding aircraft including:

- a US reconnaissance Lockheed C-130 Hercules over Armenia, with 17 casualties in 1958.
- May 1, 1960, when a S-75 Dvina missile downed Gary Powers's U-2, causing the short U-2 crisis of 1960. (See Strategic Air Command#Strategic Reconnaissance)
- On 1 September 1983 the PVO shot down Korean Air Flight 007 after they correctly believed that the civilian airliner had illegally crossed into restricted Soviet airspace but mistook it for a spy plane.

== Clarification of system name ==
Uragan (Hurricane) is a commonly used nickname for a number of Soviet military systems. Among those systems are:

- BM-27 Uragan / 9P140 Self-Propelled Multiple Rocket Launcher
- BM-21 Uragan / P140 122mm Grad multi-barrel rocket launching systems
- MAZ-543 Uragan eight-by-eight chassis
- M-22 Uragan Medium-range surface to air missile (NATO SA-N-7 Gadfly)
- GLONASS K1 Uragan satellite array, a Soviet GPS-type system

The nickname Uragan is also used in a series of powder fire extinguishing modules such as the "WFP Uragan-1M".
