= Uragan-1 =

Uragan-1 may refer to:

In military:

- Uragan-1, first generation Soviet automatic air defense interception system
- Uragan-1M, a variant of the BM-27 Uragan self-propelled multiple rocket launcher system designed in the Soviet Union

In science:

- Uragan-1, Ukrainian stellarator fusion experiment

== See also ==
- Uragan (disambiguation)
