= AA4 =

AA4 or AA-4 may refer to:

- AA-4 Awl, NATO reporting name for the Raduga K-9
- A hieroglyph (Gardiner's designated symbol "AA4")
- Aa4, a credit rating given by Moody's Investors Service
- Apollo Justice: Ace Attorney, also referred to as Ace Attorney 4
- AA4, a stem cell antigen
