= Mikoyan-Gurevich Ye-8 =

Soviet fighter prototype

Ye-8
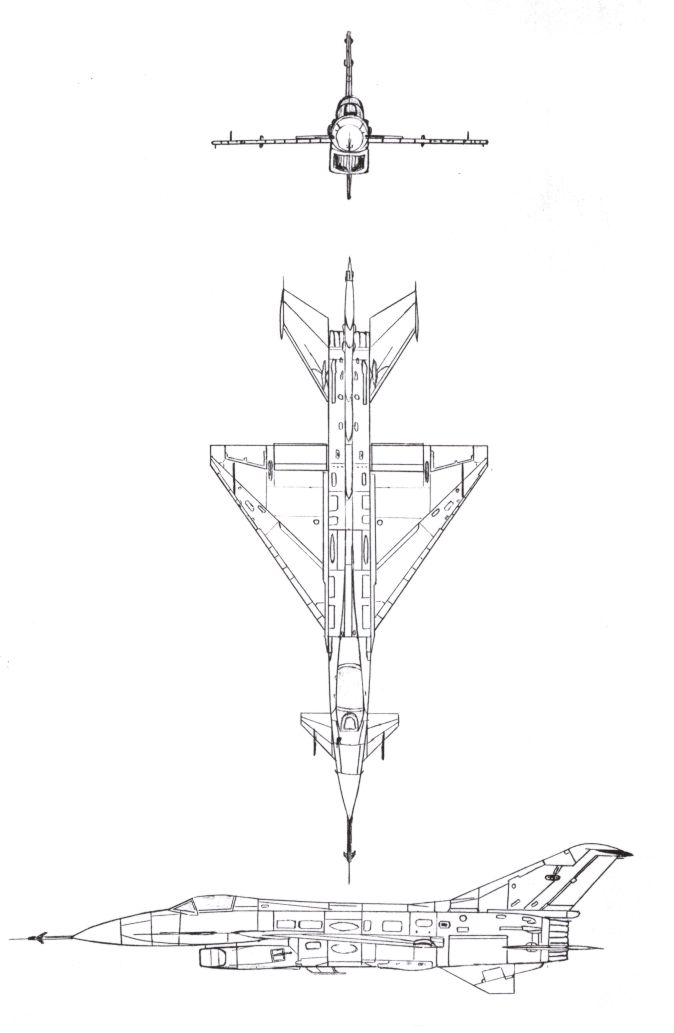

General information
- Type: Fighter aircraft
- National origin: Soviet Union
- Designer: OKB-155
- Status: Prototypes
- Number built: 2

History
- First flight: 1962
- Developed from: Mikoyan-Gurevich MiG-21

The Mikoyan-Gurevich Ye-8 (Russian: Микоян и Гуревич Е-8) (originally named MiG-23) was a supersonic jet fighter developed in the Soviet Union, intended to replace the MiG-21. Only two prototypes were built in 1960–61. The original MiG-21's air intakes were moved under the fuselage, freeing up the nose where a larger and more powerful radar, able to deliver longer range air-to-air missiles, could be built in.

Canards were installed on both sides of the nose, in front of the cockpit. They were installed to counteract the Mach Tuck Effect, which shifts the center of lift further back the faster the aircraft flies. And to increase the maneuverability, by increasing the pitch and roll rate through manipulation of the airflow over the wings, by changing the orientation of the canards. The horizontal stabilizers of MiG-21 were left at their original position. The Tumansky R-21F-300 engine, also under development, has been fitted.

The two prototypes flew in 1962. On 11 September 1962, the Tumansky R-21F-300 engine, exploded in midair at a speed of Mach 2.15. Test pilot Georgy Konstantinovich Mosolov, then one of the leading Soviet test pilots, was severely injured by debris from the compressor and had to eject at Mach 1.78.

Due to unsolved technical problems, the aircraft's development was abandoned; some parts were used on the MiG-23, including R-23 missiles and their associated Sapfir-23 radar.

Notable features:

- Ventral Air Intake, which only made their wide appearance later on Jets like the F-16 and Eurofighter Typhoon.
- Retractable Nose Canards, that were capable of mechanically independent movement below Mach 1 and locked rigid past it, that also had the capability to be retracted into the fuselage. Mechanically independently moving canards also only later appeared on the Saab JAS 39 Gripen, Dassault Rafale, Su-47 Berkut and variants of the Su-30
- Folding Ventral Fin, a massive stabilizing fin that added under the rear fuselage to prevent the jet from rolling uncontrollably at speeds above Mach 1. To keep it from scraping the runway during takeoff and landing, this large fin hydraulically folded by 90°s

== Specifications ==
Data from MiG: Fifty Years of Secret Aircraft Design

General characteristics

- Crew: 1
- Length: 16.9 m (55 ft 5 in)
- Wingspan: 7.15 m (23 ft 5 in)
- Height: 4.5 m (14 ft 9 in)
- Wing area: 23 m^{2} (250 sq ft)
- Empty weight: 5,670 kg (12,500 lb)
- Gross weight: 6,800 kg (14,991 lb)
- Max takeoff weight: 8,200 kg (18,078 lb)
- Powerplant: 1 × Tumansky R-21F-300

Performance

- Maximum speed: 2,230 km/h (1,390 mph, 1,200 kn)
- Maximum speed: Mach 2.15
- Range: 1,400 km (870 mi, 760 nmi)
- Service ceiling: 20,000 m (66,000 ft)
- g limits: 8.5 G
- Rate of climb: 235 m/s (46,300 ft/min)
- Thrust/weight: 1.05

Armament

- Missiles: 2 × K-13 air-to-air missiles (planned)

== See also ==
Related development

- Chengdu J-7
- Mikoyan-Gurevich I-75
- Shenyang J-8
- Guizhou JL-9

Aircraft of comparable role, configuration, and era

- Convair F-106X
- Dassault Milan
- Dassault Mirage IIIF/F1
- Douglas F5D
- English Electric Lightning F3/F6
- Grumman F11F-1F
- McDonnell Douglas F-4C
- Northrop F-5
- Saab Draken J 35F
- Sukhoi P-1
- Sukhoi Su-11
- Sukhoi T-49
- Vought XF8U-3 Crusader III

Related lists

- List of military aircraft of the Soviet Union and the CIS
- List of fighter aircraft
