= Mikoyan-Gurevich I-7 =

1957 Soviet interceptor aircraft prototype

I-7

General information
- Type: Interceptor aircraft
- National origin: Soviet Union
- Manufacturer: Mikoyan-Gurevich
- Status: Prototype
- Number built: 1

History
- First flight: 22 April 1957
- Developed from: Mikoyan-Gurevich I-3
- Developed into: Mikoyan-Gurevich I-75

The Mikoyan-Gurevich I-7 was a development of the Mikoyan-Gurevich I-3 experimental fighter. Planned as a Mach 2-class aircraft, the I-7 was the second of a series of three experimental fighter aircraft from the Mikoyan-Gurevich design Bureau. Like the Mikoyan-Gurevich I-3, the I-7 was to be one of the components of the automated Uragan-1 then under development by protivovozdushnaya oborona strany (PVO Strany) (English transition: Anti-Air Defence of the Nation), the Soviet defense system.

The Uragan (Hurricane) defense system was similar to the American Semi-Automatic Ground Environment (SAGE) system. Both systems used ground acquisition and tracking radar data that was fed into a computer control center that remotely guided the interceptor aircraft (or missiles) up to and including weapon final aim and/or weapon release, and then in the case of an aircraft, return the aircraft back to base and landing. A pilot was on board the remotely controlled interceptor, but was there only as a backup in case of failure in the remote control system.

In the mid/late 1950s the PVO sent requirements to many of the aircraft design bureaus for an aircraft suitable for the Uragan systems. Several of the bureaus, including Mikoyan-Gurevich, developed a series of aircraft proposals to meet those requirements. MiG’s proposal was the I-3, which evolved into the I-7 and finally the I-75 experimental aircraft.

The I-3 was to use the Klimov VK-3 afterburning bypass turbojet, the first soviet-designed afterburning bypass engine. The technically advanced VK-3 engine was not found reliable and did not meet the required power, and its troublesome development ended with cancellation of the project.

The sole I-3 aircraft was rebuilt with the more reliable Lyulka AL-7E/F afterburning turbojet engine, a project that required considerable modifications to the fuselage, as the new engine was larger. The reworked airframe was quite different from the I-3, and was designated as the I-7.

The I-7 was later involved in a landing accident and became the Mikoyan-Gurevich I-75 when the airframe was modified to accept the more powerful Lyulka AL-7F-1 engine.

== Development ==
In the summer of 1956 it was evident to the Mikoyan-and-Gurevich Design Bureau OKB-155 that the Klimov VK-3 engine would never be available, due to developmental problems that led to its eventual cancellation. The existing I-3 airframe was used to create the I-7 series of aircraft. Work began on the redesign of the aircraft to take a Lyulka AL-7E/F turbojet engine as used on the contemporary Sukhoi Su-7. The Lyulka AL-7 engine was a less complex and more dependable engine, as it did not have a bypass system. The AL7 engine was larger than the VK-3, and airframe modifications were made to accommodate it. The airframe was significantly lengthened in the process, marking the transition from the MiG-19 family of aircraft to the MiG-21.

== Design ==
The I-7U was a supersonic interceptor aircraft of all-metal construction with a mid-mounted swept wing and swept tail.

=== Fuselage ===
The long slender fuselage had a circular cross-section through the full length, except in the wing joint area where space was added for landing gear storage. The air inlet at the front the fuselage contained a very long center-body cone with a change in angle partway along its length making it a very sophisticated 3-shock mixed-compression inlet design that is optimized for speeds of more than Mach 2.0. The adjustable dielectric spike contains the search radar antenna. The air inlet duct splits into two elliptical cross-section ducts aft of the spike, routing intake air around the sides of the pressurized cockpit.

A semicircular duct along the top of the dorsal spine of the fuselage, extending from the rear of the cockpit enclosure to the vertical fin, carries electrical and fluid lines around the engine compartment. Four fuel tanks are located ahead of the engine. A fifth fuel tank is located aft of the engine, surrounding the exhaust outlet pipe. Two additional fuel tanks were placed inside the central bay of the wing, and two drop tanks could be mounted on pylons located under the central part of the fuselage.

The entire fuselage aft of the wing, along with the complete tail, was removable as a single unit for access to the engine. Once the aft fuselage was removed, it was easy to replace or adjust the engine. The aft fuselage ended with a circular adjustable exhaust nozzle.

=== Cockpit ===
The single-seat pressurized cockpit also contained the avionics equipment. The cockpit was enclosed with a two-part transparent blue-tinted canopy consisting of a front-hinged tilting front part and a fixed rear part. The front part of the canopy served as a blast shield that protected the pilot from high velocity air when ejecting at supersonic speeds. Cockpit armor protection weighed 59.8 kg and consisted of bulletproof glass in the front hinged front part of the canopy, an armor plate at the front and armored backrest and headrest at the rear.

=== Wing ===
The 55° swept wing had a slight negative camber, and was fitted with a pair of aerodynamic fences to prevent the spanwise flow of air away from the wing roots. The leading edge of the wing incorporated a pair of PVD leading edge slats. Flaps and ailerons were mounted on the trailing edge of the wing. The outer flaps were aligned with the trailing edge forward sweep and the inner flaps were perpendicular to the longitudinal axis of the body.

=== Tail ===
The tail surfaces consisted of one swept vertical surface and a pair of swept horizontal surfaces, which had zero camber. The adjustable horizontal stabilizer was attached to the sides of fuselage, at about the same height as the wing. The rudder top was made of a dielectric material, and served as a cover for the radio antenna. The airplane had a wide lower elongated fin with a rounded profile, and contained one pair of air brakes. Additional air brakes were on the lower middle part of the fuselage, at the roots of the wing leading edge.

=== Landing gear ===
The landing gear was a retractable nosegear type. The nose landing gear retracted into the forward part of the fuselage in a bay ahead of the air duct divider. The main landing gear wheels remained somewhat vertical as they retracted toward the fuselage. This allowed the wheels to retract into the side of the fuselage, alongside the engine, as the landing gear strut retracted into a horizontal opening in the bottom of the wing.

=== Weapons ===
All weapons were mounted in the wing root. There were two 30 mm Nudelman-Rikhter NR-30 cannon with 80 rounds each, and four ZP-4 retractable rotary launchers each with four type ARS-57 57 mm rockets.

=== I-7U comparison to the I-3U ===
The I-7U was very similar in appearance to the I-3U, but with many significant differences.

- The I-7U was a larger and more powerful aircraft.
- The I-7U inlet lip was sharper with a larger center-body.
- The I-7U used a more modern single-antenna radar in place of the dual-antenna radar.
- The I-7U main landing gear wheels stowed vertically in the fuselage adjacent to the engine rather than horizontally in the wing.
- The I-7U quarter-chord wing sweep was reduced from 60 degrees to 57 degrees, retaining the wing fences, but at the new sweep angle.

The wing-mounted cannon and missile armament of the I-3U was retained.

Early reports of the I-7U which recorded a top speed of Mach 1.2 was surprisingly poor, as the design speed was expected to be close to the very similar Sukhoi S-1. In fact the aircraft was considerably faster than recorded, but instrument problems in its very short test career prevented the maximum speed from being properly measured.

The I-7U's Lyulka AL-7E engine was changed to the AL-7F resulting in the I-7K. The I-7K first flew in January 1959 and was capable of flight at Mach 2.35.

The I-7 prototype, I-7P and I-7K designs were followed by the I-7SF all-weather interceptor, but this version, like the others, was not ordered into production.

== Operational history ==
On 21 June 1957, the sole prototype I-7U suffered damage when the starboard landing gear strut failed as the aircraft landed on its 13th flight. After repair, the test program was resumed but came to an end after only six more flights. After 19 flights, the last in February 1958, the I-7U was rebuilt into the I-75 prototype interceptor.

== Variants ==
I-7P
I-7 unarmed prototype
I-7U
Modification of the I-7 prototype into one of the automated PVO type Uragan-1 system components. Almaz pulse doppler radar and armament was 2 x NR-30 cannon with 80 rpg, and four type ZP-4 telescoping rotary rocket launchers in the wing roots, each with four x ARS-57 57 mm rockets.
I-7K
Modification of I-7U weapon system. The major change was the type Almaz-3 radar with two short-range command-guided K-6 missiles. The cannon armament was unchanged. The single aircraft was not completed.
I-7SF
All-weather interceptor. Design study only, none built.

== Specifications (I-7U) ==
Data from MiG: Fifty Years of Aircraft Design

General characteristics

- Crew: 1
- Length: 16.93 m (55 ft 7 in)
- Wingspan: 9.98 m (32 ft 9 in)
- Wing area: 31.9 m^{2} (343 sq ft)
- Empty weight: 7,952 kg (17,531 lb)
- Max takeoff weight: 11,540 kg (25,441 lb)
- Powerplant: 1 × Lyulka AL-7F afterburning turbojet, 61.55 kN (13,840 lbf) thrust dry, 90.35 kN (20,310 lbf) with afterburner

Performance

- Maximum speed: 2,300 km/h (1,400 mph, 1,200 kn) at 11,000 m (36,100 ft) (estimated)
- Maximum speed: Mach 1.18
- Range: 1,505 km (935 mi, 813 nmi)
- Service ceiling: 19,100 m (62,700 ft)
- Time to altitude: 1.18 minutes to 10,000 m (32,800 ft)

Armament

- Guns: 2 × 30 mm Nudelman-Rikhter NR-30 autocannon with 80 rpg
- Rockets: 4 × wing-root ZP-4 telescoping rotary rocket launchers in the wing roots rocket pods, each with 4x 57 mm S-5 rockets
