= Mikoyan-Gurevich Ye-150 family =

Prototype interceptor series designed by Mikoyan-Gurevich

Ye-150 family
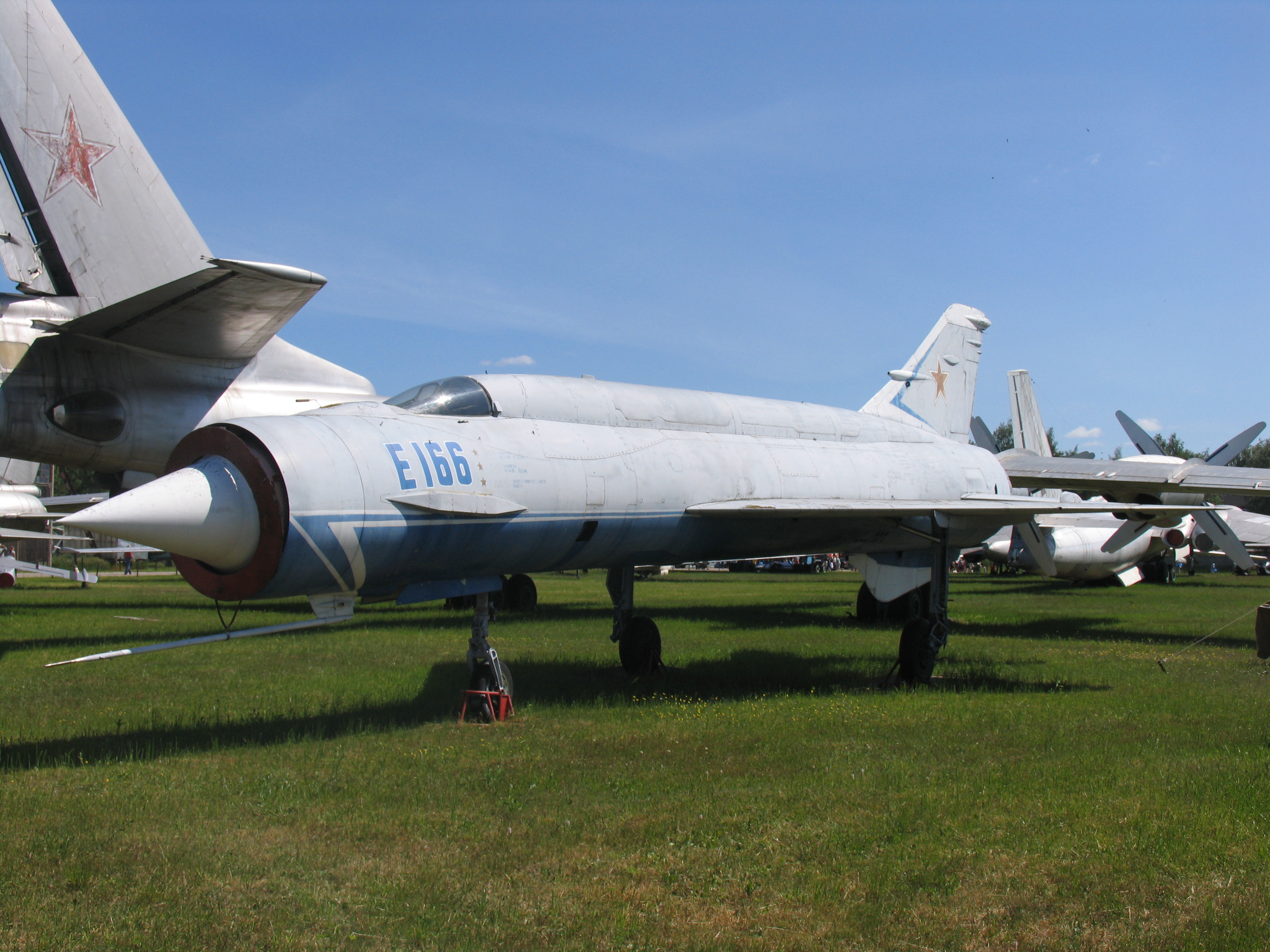
- Ye-152M/1 (Ye-166)

General information
- Type: Interceptor aircraft
- National origin: Soviet Union
- Manufacturer: Mikoyan-Gurevich
- Status: Prototypes
- Number built: 1 x Ye-150, 2 x Ye-152, 1 x Ye-152A

History
- First flight: Ye-152A – 10 July 1959; Ye-150 - 8 July 1960; Ye-152 – 21 April 1961
- Developed from: Mikoyan-Gurevich I-75

The Mikoyan-Gurevich Ye-150 family was a series of prototype interceptor aircraft designed and built by the Mikoyan-Gurevich design bureau in the Soviet Union from 1955.

== Design and development ==
To fulfil the needs of the Protivo-Vozdushnaya Oborona (Air Defence Forces, PVO) for a heavy interceptor to carry out automatic interceptions, the MiG bureau had developed a range of large fighter aircraft starting with the swept-wing I-3 series (i.e., I-380, I-410 and I-420), followed by the I-7 and the I-75. The requirement for supersonic interception speed and the ability to carry heavy avionic systems dictated the size: the contemporary MiG-21F (similar in layout), weighed 4,819 kg (10,624 lb) and was 15.76m (51 ft 8-1/2in) long, compared with 12,345 kg (27,215 lb) and 18.14m (59 ft 6in) respectively, for the Ye-150.

The MAP (Ministerstvo Aviatsionnoy Promyshlennosti - Ministry of Aviation Industry) ordered the Mikoyan OKB to build prototypes of the new interceptor, to be armed with either K-6, K-7, K-8, K-9 missiles; unguided rockets; or an aimable twin-cannon installation. Automatic guidance to the interception point was to be provided by Uragan-5 (Hurricane-5) integrated weapons systems.

== Variants ==
=== Ye-150 ===
The initial missile-armed version, designated Ye-150, flew for the first time on 8 July 1960, after extensive ground checks of systems and a delay in delivery of a flight-worthy engine. Flight testing progressed slowly, hampered by the very short life of the R-15 engine (barely sufficient for pre-flight ground checks and a single flight), as well as problems with aileron buffeting, brake parachute failure, and the engine accessory gearbox disintegrating. Manufacturer's flight tests, over 42 flights, revealed very high rates of climb, impressive maximum speed (Mach 2.65 at 19,100 m (62,700 ft) using less than full throttle), and a phenomenal service ceiling of at least 21,000 m (69,000 ft).

Installation of weapons systems was not carried out on the Ye-150 and it was not authorised for production, but development continued with the Ye-151 and Ye-152.

=== Ye-151 ===
The Ye-151 cannon-armed version was designed in parallel with the Ye-150 but did not proceed to the hardware stage. The weapon system was to have consisted of twin TKB-495 or Makarov TKB-539 cannon, with a rate of fire of 2,000 rds/min, mounted on a rotating ring in tilting mounts. The mounts could tilt ±30° and the mounting ring could rotate 360°, which gave the installation a 60° cone of fire around the centreline of the mounting ring. To accommodate the ring turret, the inlet duct was lengthened with the rotating ring forming the inlet lip, wind tunnel testing confirming that the extended inlet duct would actually improve aerodynamic and inlet performance; the lengthened inlet was retained for all later Ye-150 series aircraft (without cannon installation). Further tunnel testing with an inlet mounting fitted with cannon revealed destabilising forces when the cannon were deflected, making accurate weapon aiming impossible and precluding further development. Studies were carried out with the cannon mount aft of the cockpit to reduce the destabilising moment, as the Ye-151-2, but no hardware resulted.

=== Ye-152 ===
The two single-engined Ye-152's were completed with improved R-15-300 engines, as the Ye-152-1 and Ye-152-2, but reliability remained an issue, with only limited development flying, weapons system testing and world record flights carried out. The poor reliability of the engine and the cancellation of the intended K-9 / Uragan-5B weapon system brought the Ye-152 program to a close. Cropped delta wings with greater area allowed the large K-80 or K-9 missiles to be carried on wingtip launchers.

World record flights were carried out by the first prototype Ye-152-1 in 1961 and 1962, registered with the FAI as the Ye-166.

The second aircraft, Ye-152-2, was returned to Mikoyan for conversion to the Ye-152M, featuring an axisymmetric convergent-divergent nozzle and canards on either side of the forward fuselage, which were soon removed. The Ye-152M was retired to the Central Air Force Museum at Monino, misleadingly marked as the Ye-166 which was, in fact, the unmodified Ye-152-1.

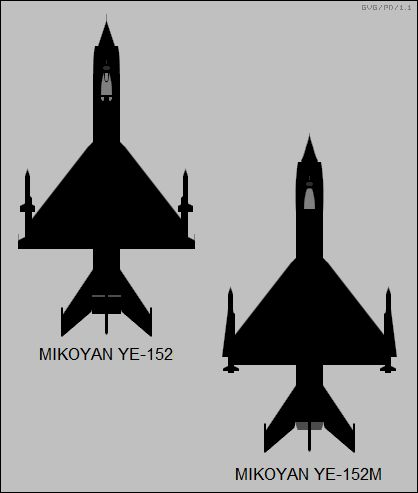
Plan view silhouettes of the Ye-152 and Ye-152M

=== Ye-152A ===
The Mikoyan-Gurevich Ye-152A was a twin-engined version of the Ye-152, sharing its general layout but utilising two Tumansky R-11 afterburning turbojets mounted side by side in a revised rear fuselage. The change in engine type, necessitated by the extremely poor reliability of the R-15, led to a widened rear fuselage with large ventral fins. The majority of the airframe was identical to the Ye-152, incorporating the extended inlet and fuselage found to be advantageous during testing for the proposed Ye-151 cannon-armed variant of the Ye-150. Due to the use of fully developed and reliable R-11 engines, the Ye-152A was ready for flight in July 1959 and continued to fly on test duties at the Mikoyan-Gurevich test centre until it crashed in 1965.

Armament was to have been two K-9 air-to-air missiles, as part of the Ye-152-9-V weapon system, featuring the TsKB Almaz TsP-1 fire control radar.

The Ye-152A was assigned the NATO reporting name Flipper after a flypast during the 1961 Aviation Day display at Tushino and also erroneously identified as a MiG-23.

=== Ye-152P ===
A proposed development, powered by the more reliable R-15-300 engine and using the Uragan-5B weapon control system and carrying the large K-80 long-range AAM.

=== Ye-152M ===
The Ye-152-2 was returned to the Mikoyan factory for conversion to the Ye-152M, fitted with small canard surfaces on either side of the forward fuselage and an R-15-300 engine fitted with an axisymmetric convergent-divergent nozzle, allowing the ejector ring around the rear fuselage to be dispensed with. After initial flight testing the canards were removed leaving the mounting structures behind. Used for further testing of the R-15 engine and Uragan weapon systems, the Ye-152M was retired to the Central Air Force Museum at Monino bearing the erroneous identity Ye-166 and three red stars to signify the world records set by its sister ship, the Ye-152-1.

=== Ye-166 ===
Fictitious designation of the Ye-152-1, used when registering the world records with the Fédération Aéronautique Internationale (FAI). Also applied to the Ye-152M displayed at Monino as an intelligence ruse.

=== MiG-23 ===
An erroneous designation applied by western intelligence observers to the Ye-152A after the display at Tushino in 1961.

== Uragan-5 ==
Development of the Uragan-5 automatic weapons system was initiated by the Council of Ministers in 1955 to intercept supersonic bombers flying at 10–25,000 m (33–82,021 ft) altitude at 1,600–2,000 km/h (990–1,240 mph; 860–1,080 kn) up to 100–120 km (62–75 mi) from the interceptor base (with sufficient warning). The system relied on ground-based radar to guide the interceptor to an intercept with the target and aircraft based radar and weapon aiming systems to complete the mission using the following components: A high resolution ground-based radar system, to provide accurate position and height data at a range of 345 km (214 mi; 186 nmi)

- Active interrogation system (SAZO)

Automatic guidance facility

- Digital control computer
- Command data link (SPK)

Interceptor-fighter with airborne radar (minimum detection range 25 km (16 mi; 13 nmi)), autopilot, and weapon-aiming computer (SRP)

- Mikoyan-Gurevich Ye-150
- Mikoyan-Gurevich Ye-151
- Mikoyan-Gurevich Ye-152
- Mikoyan-Gurevich Ye-152A
- Mikoyan-Gurevich Ye-150P
- Mikoyan-Gurevich Ye-150M

Armament options included:

- 2 x 30 mm autocannons in a tilting rotatable mount
- unguided rockets
- 2 x K-6 air-to-air missiles
- 2 x K-7 AAMs
- 2 x K-8 AAMs
- 2 x K-9 AAMs

A combination of delays in development of the electronic components, missiles and poor reliability of the Tumansky R-15 engines for the aircraft component led to the Uragan-5 system, fitted to Ye-150 derivatives being cancelled in 1962.

== Specifications (Ye-152-1) ==
Data from Gordon

General characteristics

- Crew: 1
- Length: 19.656 m (64 ft 6 in)
- Wingspan: 8.793 m (28 ft 10 in)
- Wing area: 40.02 m^{2} (430.8 sq ft)
- Empty weight: 10,900 kg (24,030 lb)
- Max takeoff weight: 14,350 kg (31,636 lb)
- Powerplant: 1 × Tumansky R-15-300 afterburning turbojet engine, 66.7 kN (15,000 lbf) thrust dry, 99.6 kN (22,400 lbf) with afterburner

Performance

- Maximum speed: 3,030 km/h (1,880 mph, 1,640 kn) at 15,400 m (50,500 ft)
- Maximum speed: Mach 2.85
- Range: 1,470 km (910 mi, 790 nmi)
- Service ceiling: 22,680 m (74,400 ft)
- Rate of climb: 62.5 m/s (12,300 ft/min)

Armament

- Guns: 2 × 23 mm Afanasev Makarov AM-23 autocannons in an aimable mount (Ye-151)
- Missiles: ** 2 × K-6 air-to-air missiles
  - 2 × K-7 AAMs
  - 2 × K-8 AAMs
  - 2 × K-9 AAMs

Avionics

- Uragan-5 weapons control system

== See also ==
Aircraft of comparable role, configuration, and era

- Avro Canada CF-105 Arrow
- Mikoyan-Gurevich I-75F
- Shenyang J-8
