= AA3 =

AA3 or AA-3 may refer to:

- Phoenix Wright: Ace Attorney − Trials and Tribulations, the third video game of the series
- America's Army 3, one of several version of the video game
- ATRAC files use the file extension .aa3
- AA-3 Anab, Kaliningrad K-8 (R-8)'s, a medium-range air-to-air missile, NATO reporting name
- Hieroglyph that represents a pustule with liquid issuing from it (Gardiner's designated symbol "AA3")
- Aa3, a credit rating given by Moody's Investors Service
