= Uragan =

Uragan is the Slavic word for hurricane, and can refer to

- BM-27 Uragan, a Russian rocket launcher
- Energia-2 or Uragan, a planned Soviet super heavy-lift rocket
- GLONASS (satellite), Uragan, the first satellites of the GLONASS constellation
- MAZ-7310 Uragan, a Soviet/Russian army vehicle
- M-22 Uragan/Shtil (SA-N-7, Gadfly), a Soviet naval multirole SAM system
- Uragan-class guard ship, Soviet patrol and escort ships
- Uragan-class monitor, Imperial Russian ironclad warships
- Uragan D2, the trade name of a cyanide-based pesticide, formerly Zyklon B
- Uragan-1 (stellarator), Uragan-2, Uragan-2M, Uragan-3, Uragan-3M, a series of Ukrainian stellarator fusion experiments

== See also ==
- Uragan-1 (disambiguation)
