= K-9 (missile) =

- K-9 prototype missile
- Type: short-range air-to-air missile
- Place of origin: Soviet Union

Production history
- Manufacturer: Raduga

Specifications
- Mass: 245 kg (540 lb)
- Length: 4.5 m (14 ft 9 in)
- Diameter: 250 mm (9.8 in)
- Wingspan: 1.6 m (5 ft 3 in)
- Warhead: 27 kg (60 lb)
- Engine: two-stage solid-fuel rocket engine
- Operational range: 9 km (5.6 mi)
- Maximum speed: 5,040 km/h (3,130 mph)
- Guidance system: SARH
- Launch platform: Mikoyan-Gurevich Ye-152A

The K-9 (NATO reporting name AA-4 'Awl') was a short-range air-to-air missile developed by the Soviet Union in the late 1950s. It was designed by MKB Raduga, a division of aircraft maker Mikoyan-Gurevich. The K-9 was also known as the K-155, and would apparently have had the service designation R-38. It was intended to arm the Mikoyan-Gurevich Ye-152A (NATO reporting name 'Flipper'), an experimental high speed twin-engine aircraft, predecessor to the Mikoyan-Gurevich MiG-25 'Foxbat'. When the Ye-152A was shown at Tushino in 1961, a prototype of the K-9 missile was displayed with it.

Neither the 'Flipper' nor the 'Awl' ever entered production.
