= Klimov VK-3 =

1950s Soviet turbojet aircraft engine

The Klimov VK-3 was the first Soviet afterburning bypass turbojet engine. Designed by S V Lyunevich at Klimov, at OKB-117 in 1949, this engine first ran in 1952, and was qualified at 5,730 kg (12,632 lb) thrust (dry) and 8,440 kg (18,607 lb) thrust (with afterburner) in 1954. The VK-3 was developed for the Mikoyan-Gurevich I-3 (I-380) and I-3U/I-5 (I-410) fighters. First flown in the I-3U in July 1956, the engine's performances was good but its reliability was poor. Even after modifications in December 1956 when newly designed compressor blades were installed, developmental problems continued, the program was ultimately canceled in January 1958. The engine was superseded by the Lyulka AL-7F, a less modern but more efficient engine.

== Design ==
The VK-3 is a single-shaft turbofan engine with a 10-stage axial compressor, an annular combustion chamber, a three-stage turbine, an afterburner and a variable supersonic nozzle. Bypass air is drawn from the second stage of the compressor to 12 external pipes and is directed into the turbine through an adjustable mixing valve, bypassing the combustion chamber. The 8th stage compressor has two position adjustable guide vanes.

== Applications ==
- Mikoyan-Gurevich I-3
- Mikoyan-Gurevich I-5

== Specifications ==
Data from

==== General characteristics ====
- Type: afterburning turbofan
- Length:
- Diameter:
- Dry weight: 1,850 kg (4,079 lb)

==== Components ====
- Compressor: 10 stage axial
- Combustors: annular combustion chamber
- Turbine: three-stage

==== Performance ====
- Maximum thrust: 5,730 kg (12,632 lb) thrust (dry) and 8,440 kg (18,607 lb) thrust (with afterburner)
- Thrust-to-weight ratio: 4.56

== See also ==
Comparable engines

- Pratt & Whitney TF30
- Pratt & Whitney F100
- Pratt & Whitney PW1120
- General Electric F110
- Saturn AL-31
- Shenyang WS-10

Related lists

- List of aircraft engines
