= Nudelman-Rikhter NR-30 =

NR-30
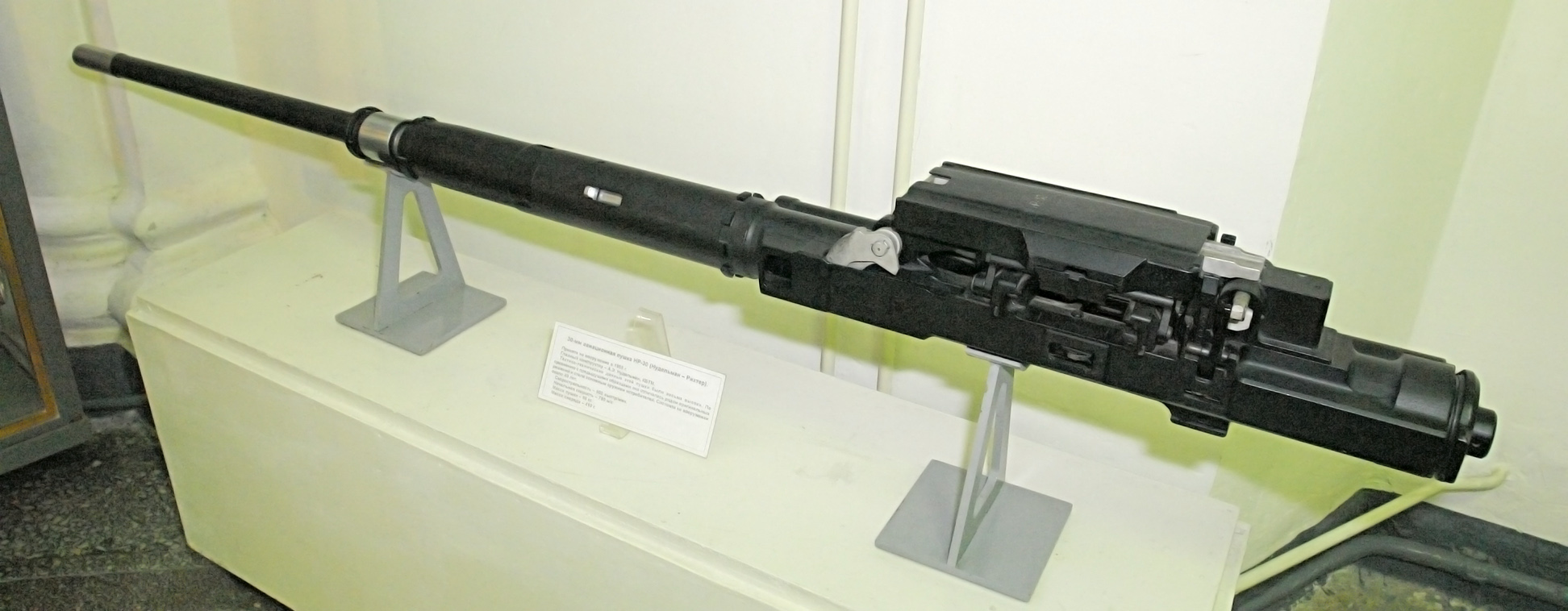
- The Nudelman-Richter NR-30.
- Type: Single-barrel Autocannon
- Place of origin: Soviet Union

Service history
- Used by: Soviet Union, Russia, China

Production history
- Variants: Norinco Type 30

Specifications
- Mass: 66 kg (146 lb)
- Length: 2,153 mm (7 ft 1 in)
- Barrel length: 1,600 mm (5 ft 3 in)
- Width: 181 mm (7 in)
- Height: 186 mm (7.3 in)
- Cartridge: 30x155mm
- Caliber: 30 mm (1.2 in)
- Barrels: 1
- Action: Short recoil
- Rate of fire: 850–1,000 rpm
- Muzzle velocity: 780 m/s (2,560 ft/s)

The Nudelman-Rikhter NR-30 was a Soviet autocannon widely used in military aircraft of the Soviet Union and Warsaw Pact. It was designed by A.E. Nudelman and A. A. Rikhter, entering service in 1954.

== Description ==
Prior to the introduction of the NR-30, most Soviet autocannon were of 23 or 37 mm calibre and often used in combination. For instance, the Mikoyan-Gurevich MiG-15 was equipped with two NR-23's and a single N-37. The two were mismatched; the NR-23 was a rapid-fire weapon with relatively low explosive power, while the N-37 was extremely powerful, typically able to destroy a bomber with a single hit, but with a very low firing rate which made it unsuited to firing at manoeuvring targets like fighters. Moreover, the two had very different ballistics which meant that long-range fire would result in only one or the other set of guns being properly aimed.

The NR-30 was an attempt to solve this problem by introducing a single weapon that could serve in both roles. It was essentially an enlarged version of the NR-23 using the same short recoil mechanism firing a new 400 gram 30 mm round that was roughly twice the mass of the earlier NR-23 and slightly less than half that of the N-37. While not capable of destroying a bomber in a single hit, it made up for this by improving the firing rate to 900 cycles per minute, beyond that of the NR-23. Muzzle velocity increased to 800 m/s, besting both the NR-23 and N-37.

Its total firepower, the product of per-round energy and firing rate, was better than either of the earlier weapons. This demanded the use of a muzzle brake with an integrated flame damper to prevent airframe damage from its firing. In fighters, wing mountings were more common than the nose mounts of the earlier designs. This often required small sections of stainless steel to be fitted to the wing skinning to protect it.

Aircraft typically carried a load of 70 shells for each gun. There were 20 different types of ammunition available; the most used were AP and HEI, the latter of 40–48 g HE internal charge, several times larger than 20 mm ammunition. An unusual munition was the Chaff dispenser PRL, with 48,000 chaff particles internally; it is not known how it was used.

The NR-30 was also remarkably light, about one-third lighter than the N-37 while offering higher firepower. The GSh-301 is the only lighter 30 mm gun.

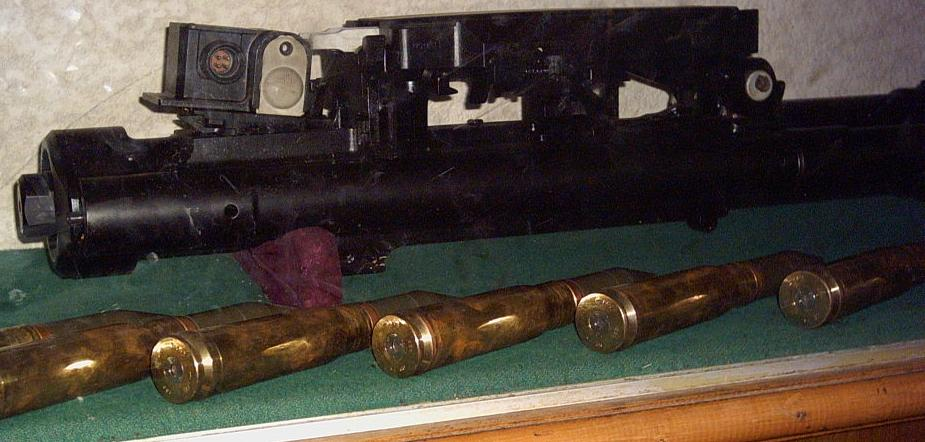
A close up at the NR-30 cannon and its cartridges displayed at the Egyptian Military museum.

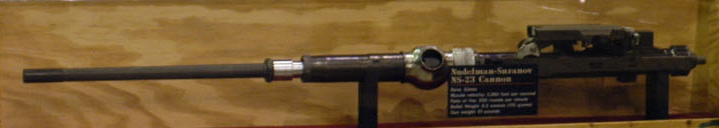
A NR-30 on display at the National Museum of the US Air Force (incorrectly labelled as a NS-23)

The NR-30 was used mainly in the MiG-19, early MiG-21 models, the Sukhoi Su-7, and the Sukhoi Su-17. It was also used on the Shenyang J-6, the Chinese copy of the MiG-19, with a third gun in the nose. The Chinese manufactured their own version, the Type-30, basically similar though with slightly different characteristics.

== Ammunition specifications ==
- Caliber: 30×155mm (belted) with a brass case
- Projectile weight: 410 grams (14½ oz), 840 g (1 lb 13½ oz) complete
- Launch charge: 95 g to 99 g of 6/7fl VBP smokeless powder
- Types of ammunition: HEI, AP, TP, Chaff dispensers

== Users ==
- Soviet Union
- Russian Federation
- China
- Albania - Used in the J-6C aircraft from 1962 until 2005.
- Pakistan - Used in the Shenyang F-6C from 1965 until 2002. Used on F-7.
- Syria - Used in MiG-21F13, Su-7, Su-20, Su-22.

== Gallery ==
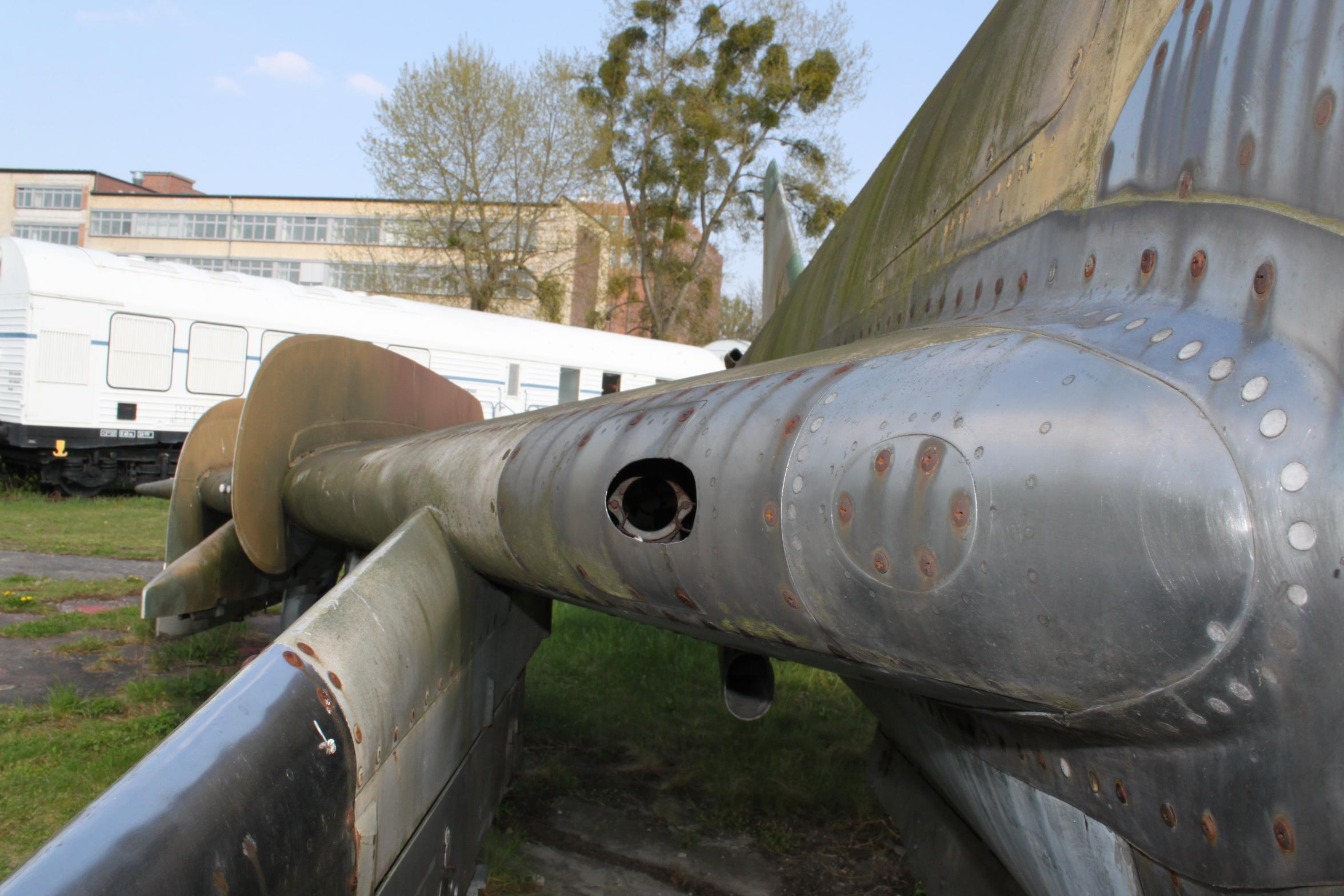
stainless steel cladding at the muzzle of NR30

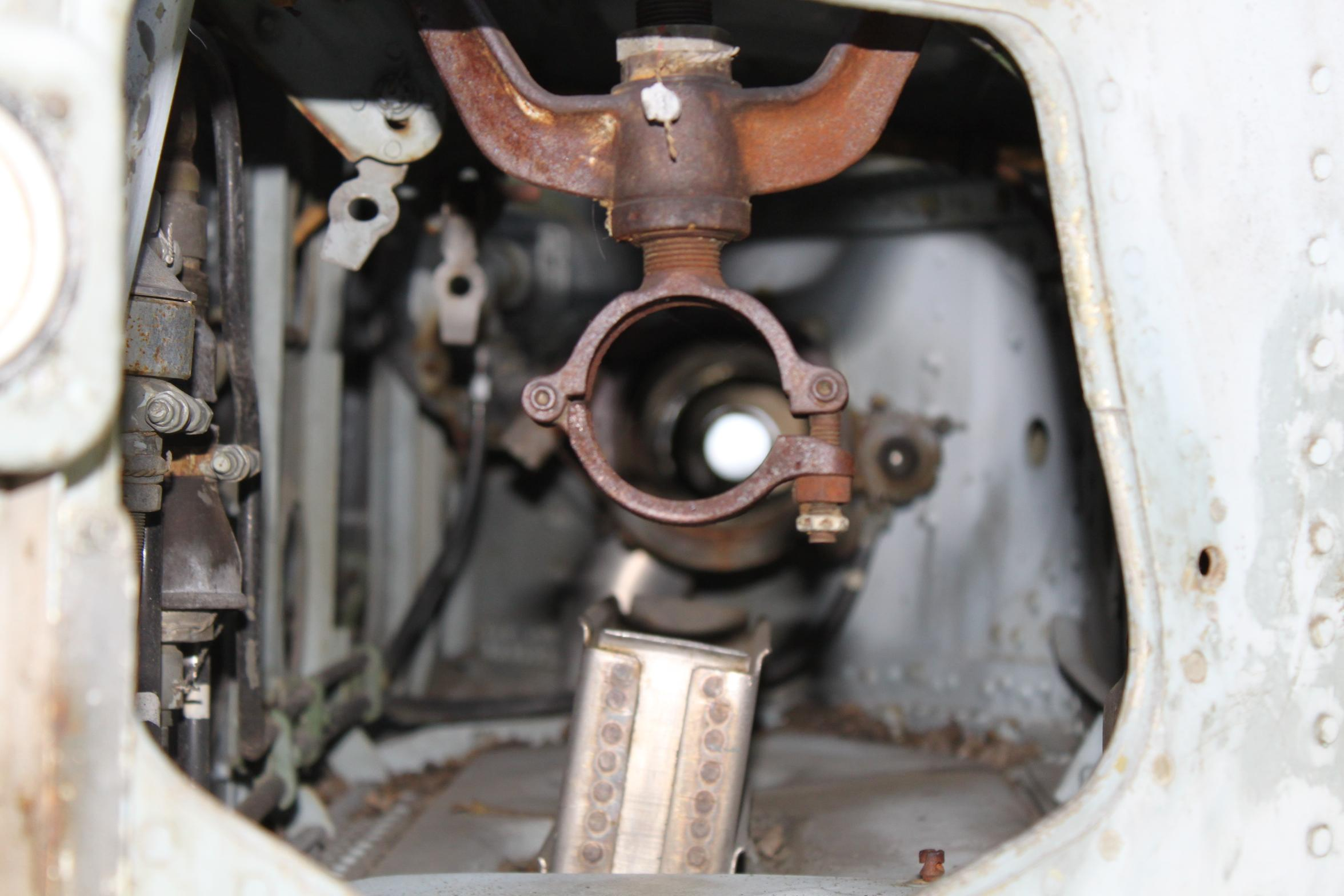
mounting of a NR-30 inside Su-22

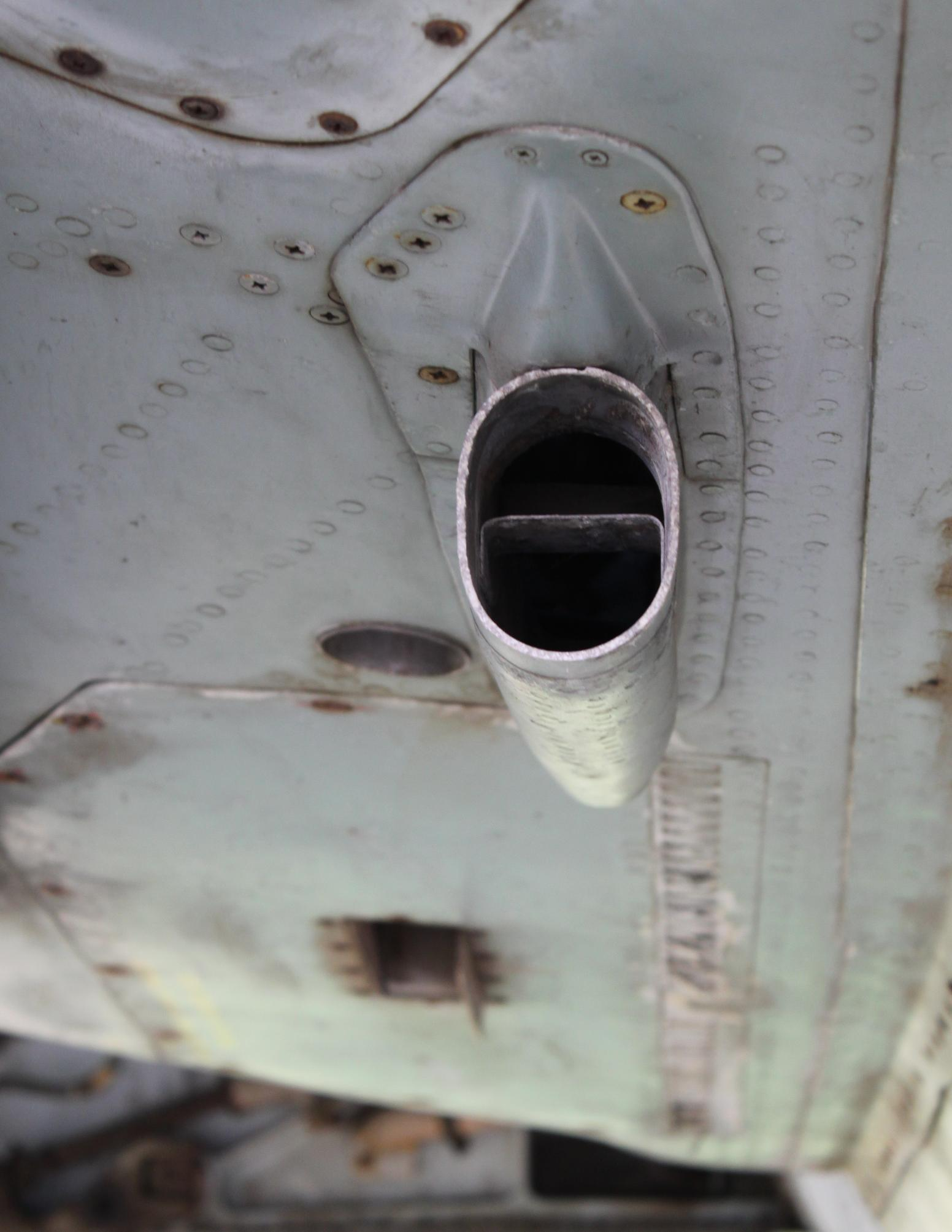
Cooling air inlet and cartridge outlet of NR30 on an Su-22
