= Mikoyan-Gurevich I-3 =

Heavy interceptor prototype fighter

I-3

General information
- Type: Fighter aircraft
- National origin: Soviet Union
- Manufacturer: Mikoyan-Gurevich
- Number built: 1 x I-3, 1 x I-3P, 1 x I-3U (rebuild from I-3)

History
- First flight: 1956 (I-3U)
- Developed into: Mikoyan-Gurevich I-7

The Mikoyan-Gurevich I-3 was the first of three interrelated fighter prototype programs developed by the Mikoyan-Gurevich design bureau in the Soviet Union in the mid/late 1950s – starting with the I-3, continuing with the I-7 and finally evolving into the I-75. On several occasions airframes were rebuilt and/or reused, both within a program or in a succeeding program. All the aircraft in the I-3 program were affected by delays in the development of the Klimov VK-3 afterburning bypass turbojet engine, and its cancellation and replacement by the Lyulka AL-7F turbojet engine.

== Design and development ==
Both the I-3 and I-3P were ordered by the Council of Ministers on June 3, 1953 – the I-3 as a frontline fighter and the I-3P as an all-weather interceptor. They were developed in parallel with the I-1/2 program but had nothing in common with it except a similar wing. On the other hand, the I-3's visual appearance was so similar to the Sukhoi S-1 (the Su-7 prototype) that a common design specification and fundamental research source seems likely. Compared to the Mikoyan-Gurevich MiG-19 the I-3U was slightly larger and heavier, but aerodynamically very similar.

== Variants ==
=== I-3 (I-380) ===
The I-3 had a longer forward fuselage compared to the I-1 and the cockpit was positioned further ahead of the 60 degree swept wing. Armament consisted of three 30 mm Nudelman-Richter NR-30 cannon, each with 65 rounds – one in the left wing root and two on the right side. The Klimov VK-3 turbojet was never provisioned or fitted to the airframe. In 1956 the I-3 was converted into the I-3U.

=== I-3P ===
Developed in parallel with the I-3, but equipped with the same Almaz search radar as the I-1. Armament consisted of two 30 mm Nudelman-Richter NR-30 cannon. In addition, two ORO-57K rocket launchers, each with 16 55 mm ARS-57 (S-5) unguided rockets or two 190 mm TRS-190 unguided rockets or two 212 mm ARS-212 unguided rockets or two 250 kg bombs could be carried on pylons under the wing. Development was halted in late 1954.

=== I-3U (I-5) ===
The I-3U was modified from the unfinished I-3; the fuselage was stretched 93 cm (from 12.27 m to 13.20 m), the nose redesigned to accommodate the Uragan-1 fire control system (hence the U in the designation) above the inlet and an Almaz search radar with a search/track range of 17 km was fitted in the cone centered in the inlet. Armament consisted of two 30 mm Nudelman-Richter NR-30 cannon with symmetrical auto ranging connected to the radar. In addition to the fire control system, Mikoyan-Gurevich also used, for the first time, titanium alloys in the rear fuselage where high temperatures were expected. The conversion from I-3 to I-3U was completed in 1956.

Flight testing took place on an irregular basis in 1956–1958 due to engine flaws and frequent modifications. A total of 34 test flights were carried out, with design bureau test pilot Georgiy Mossolov reaching a speed of 1960 km/h at attitude on one flight. The program was cancelled on June 17, 1958.

== Specifications (I-3U) ==
Data from

General characteristics

- Crew: 1
- Length: 15.78 m (51 ft 9 in)
- Wingspan: 8.98 m (29 ft 6 in)
- Wing area: 30 m^{2} (320 sq ft)
- Empty weight: 6,447 kg (14,213 lb)
- Gross weight: 8,600 kg (18,960 lb)
- Max takeoff weight: 10,028 kg (22,108 lb)
- Powerplant: 1 × Klimov VK-3 afterburning turbojet engine, 82.4 kN (18,500 lbf) thrust

Performance

- Maximum speed: 1,960 km/h (1,220 mph, 1,060 kn)
- Maximum speed: Mach 1.59
- Range: 1,290 km (800 mi, 700 nmi)
- Service ceiling: 18,800 m (61,700 ft)

Armament

  - 2 × 30 mm Nudelman-Rikhter NR-30 autocannon

== See also ==
Aircraft of comparable role, configuration, and era

- Sukhoi S-1
