= Mikoyan-Gurevich I-75 =

Experimental interceptor designed by Mikoyan-Gurevich

I-75

General information
- Type: Experimental interceptor aircraft
- National origin: Soviet Union
- Manufacturer: Mikoyan-Gurevich
- Status: Terminated after losing competition to T-43 (Su-9)

History
- First flight: 1958
- Developed from: Mikoyan-Gurevich I-7
- Developed into: Mikoyan-Gurevich Ye-150 family

The Mikoyan-Gurevich I-75 was the final design of a series of three experimental swept-wing interceptors developed in the Soviet Union in the mid-late 1950s by the Mikoyan-Gurevich design bureau from their Mikoyan-Gurevich I-3 airframe. All the aircraft in the I-3 program were affected by delays in the development of the Klimov VK-3 turbojet engine, its cancellation and ultimate replacement by the Lyulka AL-7F turbojet engine.

== Design and development ==
The I-75 was a re-engined and radar-equipped version of the experimental I-7 Mach 2 class aircraft. Work on the I-7U started in early 1956, as a development of the proposed Klimov VK-3 (82.37 kN (18,518.83 lbf) thrust) turbojet powered I-3 prototype fighter. The airframe of the I-3 was modified for the larger and more powerful Lyulka AL-7F after-burning turbojet engine. A short test flight programme ended on 24 January 1958, after which the prototype was rebuilt into the I-75 by fitting an AL-7F-1 that delivered "dry" thrust of 6240 kg and 9215 kg with afterburner and modifying the nose to accept the Uragan-5 radar intercept system.

The maiden flight of I-75 took part on 28 April 1958. The Uragan-5B radar was fitted on 15 May 1958 and the tests continued from 25 December 1958.

Despite its excellent performance the I-75 constantly suffered from development delays and the I-75 programme was terminated on 11 May 1959.

Production contracts were placed for the contemporary Sukhoi T-43 (the Su-9 prototype), as Sukhoi were able to develop this interceptor faster due to its high commonality with the Su-7 tactical fighter.

The armament of the I-75 consisted of two beam-riding long-range Kaliningrad K-8 missiles. So equipped, I-75 became a part of the Uragan automated interception system for which it served as a testbed for some time (more research being conducted on the much faster Ye-150 series delta-winged Mach 2.5+ class planes).

The Uragan-5 was the first Soviet radar system with head-on attack capability; maximum detection range was 30 km (19 mi) and acquisition range was up to 20 km (12 mi).

The Uragan complex was designed to automatically guide the interceptor to its target, perform the attack, and withdrawal from action. Apart from the radar and the aircraft, the system consisted of a 345 km (214 mi) range ground radar, digital control computer, data acquisition and processing equipment, and an autopilot. The system was expected to be able to intercept bombers flying at 10 to 25 km (16 mi) altitude at 1600–2000 km/h; the interception was to take place within a 120 km (75 mi) radius from the aircraft base.

== Specifications (I-75F with AL-7F-1 engine) ==
Data from MiG: Fifty Years of Secret Aircraft Design, OKB MiG : a history of the Design Bureau and its aircraft

General characteristics

- Crew: 1
- Length: 16.96 m (55 ft 8 in)
- Wingspan: 9.97 m (32 ft 9 in)
- Wing area: 31.2 m^{2} (336 sq ft)
- Gross weight: 11,380 kg (25,089 lb)
- Max takeoff weight: 11,470 kg (25,287 lb)
- Powerplant: × Lyulka AL-7F-1 afterburning turbojet engine, 61 kN (13,800 lbf) thrust dry, 82.38 kN (18,519 lbf) with afterburner

Performance

- Maximum speed: 2,300 km/h (1,400 mph, 1,200 kn) at 11,400 m (37,400 ft)
- Maximum speed: Mach 1.66
- Range: 1,470 km (910 mi, 790 nmi) at 12,000 m (39,000 ft)
- Service ceiling: 21,000 m (69,000 ft)
- Time to altitude: 6,000 m (20,000 ft) in 56 seconds

10,000 m (33,000 ft) in 2 minutes
11,000 m (36,000 ft) 3 minutes 3 seconds

Armament

- Missiles: 2 × K-8 air-to-air missiles

== Notes and references ==
- Gunston, Bill, The Osprey Encyclopedia of Russian Aircraft 1875–1995. London: Osprey, 1995. ISBN 1-85532-405-9.
- Belyakov, R.A and J. Marmain. MiG:Fifty Years of Secret Aircraft Design. Shrewsbury, UK: Airlife, 1994. ISBN 1-85310-488-4.
- Gordon, Yefim. Sukhoi Interceptor. Hinkley, Midland. 2004. ISBN 1-85780-180-6
