= Sukhoi P-1 =

1957 Soviet prototype fighter aircraft

P-1
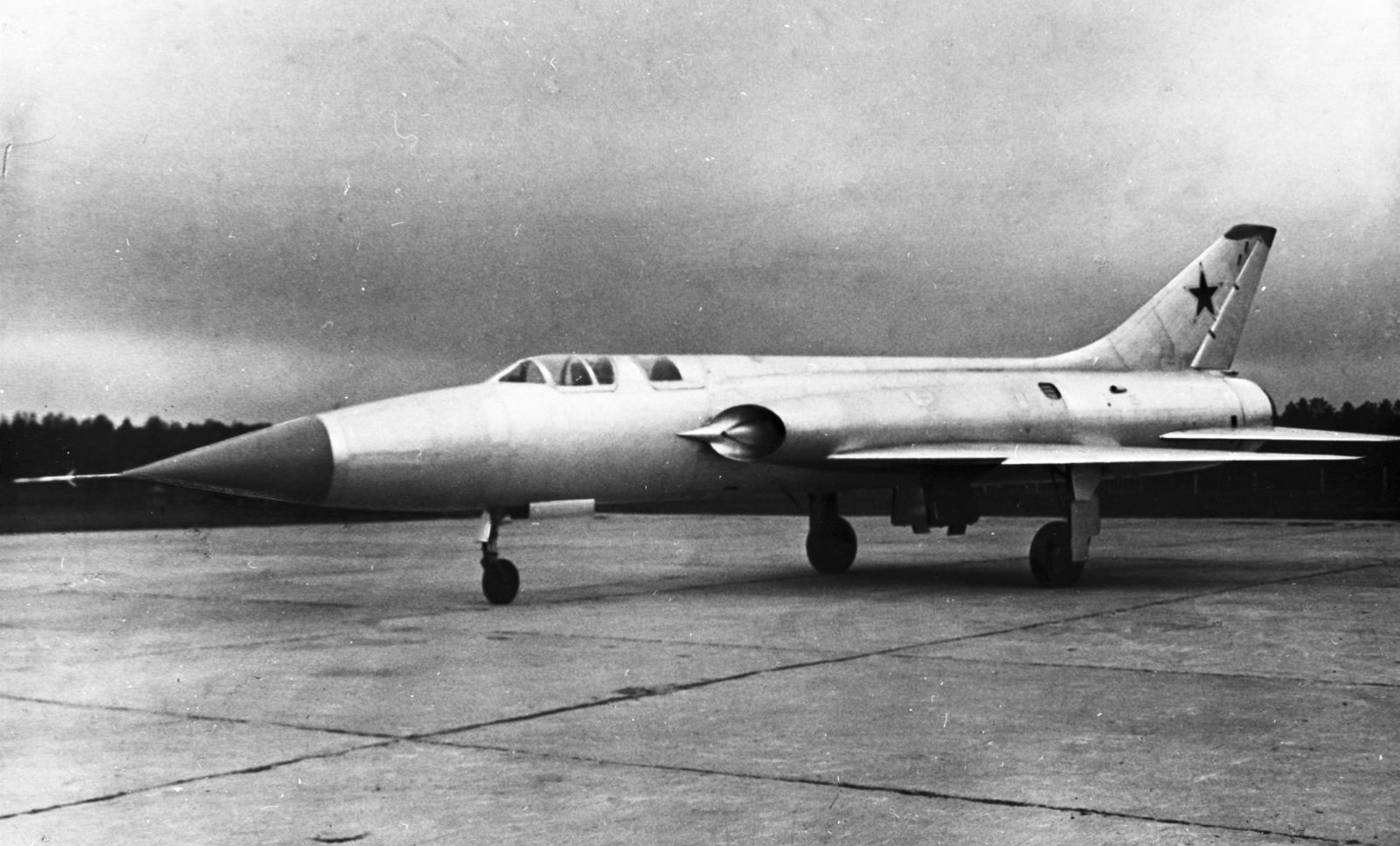

General information
- Type: Interceptor
- Manufacturer: Sukhoi OKB
- Status: Prototype only
- Number built: 1

History
- First flight: 12 July 1957

The Sukhoi P-1 was a prototype Soviet interceptor.

== Development ==
Sukhoi began design studies for what was to become Izdeliye P in 1954 to meet an urgent request from the Ministry of Aviation Industry (MAP – Ministerstvo Aviatsionnoy Promyshlennosti – ministry of aviation industry). The early studies considered crew size, armament (missiles, cannon or both), and powerplant (with a choice of Lyulka AL-9 or AL-11, Klimov VK-9F, Kuznetsov P-2 or Kuznetsov P-4 engines).

The P-1 was designed for the Uragan-1 (Hurricane-1) collision-course intercept radar, which was quite complex and bulky, requiring a crew of two and air intakes on either side of the fuselage rather than at the nose, retaining the delta wing of the Sukhoi T-3 with 57-degree leading edge sweep. Although the production aircraft was intended to use the Lyulka AL-9 engine, then in development, the prototype was fitted with a Lyulka AL-7F of lower power.

The P-1 first flew in July 1957, but underwent only limited flight testing due to unavailability of the intended powerplant and ongoing problems with the radar and missile systems as well as a lack of enthusiasm from the VVS (Voyenno-Vozdooshnyye Seely – Soviet air forces). OKB-51 persisted for some time trying to raise enthusiasm for the P-1 by proposing a larger engine, the Tumansky R-15-300 afterburning turbojet, with a similar lack of success. The sole P-1 prototype was relegated to experimental work and later scrapped.

A second prototype, the P-2 was studied, powered by twin Klimov VK-11 engines in the rear fuselage, but this version was cancelled at the mock-up review stage.

== Specifications (P-1 as designed) ==
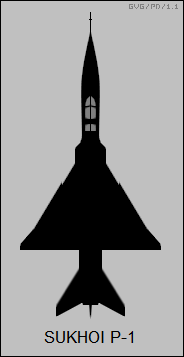
Sukhoi P-1 silhouette

Data from Green, Sukhoi Interceptors

General characteristics

- Crew: 2
- Length: 21.3 m (69 ft 11 in)
- Wingspan: 9.8 m (32 ft 2 in)
- Wing area: 44 m^{2} (470 sq ft)
- Gross weight: 10,750 kg (23,700 lb)
- Powerplant: 1 × Lyulka AL-7F afterburning turbojet engine, 67 kN (15,100 lbf) thrust dry, 87.8 kN (19,730 lbf) with afterburner

Performance

- Maximum speed: 2,050 km/h (1,270 mph, 1,110 kn)
- Maximum speed: Mach 1.93
- Range: 2,000 km (1,200 mi, 1,100 nmi)
- Service ceiling: 19,500 m (64,000 ft)

Armament

- Rockets: 50x ARS-57 57 mm (2.2 in) unguided folding-fin rockets in pop-up launchers around the fuselage nose
- Missiles: 2 × K-7 radar-guided missiles

Avionics

- AP-38Zh-1B autopilot
- pantera fire-control radar
- AEK-54 ADF
- MRP-56P marker beacon Rx
- RV-U long-range radar altimeter
- SOD-57M DME
- GIK-1 gyro-flux gate compass
- AGI-1 artificial horizon
- RSIU-4V VHF
- SPU-2 intercom
- Gorizont-1 (Horizon-1) GCI
- SRZO-2M Kremniy-2M IFF
- Sirena-2 RWR
