= List of Soviet and Russian aircraft =

This is an incomplete list of Soviet and Russian military aircraft, from the Soviet Union's foundation in 1917 until its present state as Russia.

== Beriev ==
=== Production ===
Military aircraft

- MBR-2 - 1931 maritime patrol flying boat
- MBR-7 - 1937 reconnaissance flying boat and light bomber
- Be-2 - 1936 reconnaissance floatplane
- Be-10 - 1956 maritime patrol flying boat
- Be-12 - 1960 anti-submarine and maritime patrol flying boat
- S-13 - high-altitude reconnaissan
- A-40 - 1986 anti-submarine warfare amphibious flying boat
- A-50 - 1978 airborne early warning and control aircraft
- A-60 - 1981 airborne laser laboratory
- A-100 - 2016 airborne early warning and control aircraft

Civilian aircraft

- Be-103 - 1997 passenger and utility transport flying boat
- Be-200 - 1998 multirole flying boat

=== Experimental ===
Military aircraft

- MDR-5 - 1938 reconnaissance aircraft
- R-1 - 1952 flying boat
- Be-1 - 1964 experimental ground effect aircraft
- Be-4 - 1940 reconnaissance flying boat
- Be-6 - 1949 maritime patrol flying boat
- VVA-14 - 1972 ground effect aircraft

Civilian aircraft

- Be-8 - 1947 passenger and liaison floatplane
- Be-30 - 1967 regional airliner and utility transport aircraft

=== Planned ===
- Be-112 - passenger flying boat

== Ilyushin ==
=== Production ===
Military aircraft

- DB-3 - 1935 bomber
- DB-4 - 1940 bomber
- Il-2 - 1939 ground-attack aircraft
- Il-4 - 1936 bomber
- Il-10 - 1944 ground-attack aircraft
- Il-14 - 1950 military transport aircraft
- Il-28 - 1948 tactical bomber
- Il-38 - 1971 maritime patrol and anti-submarine aircraft
- Il-78 - 1983 tanker
- Il-80 - 1987 airborne command and control aircraft
- Il-103 - 1994 trainer

Civilian aircraft

- Il-12 - 1945 transport aircraft
- Il-18 - 1957 airliner
- Il-62 - 1963 airliner
- Il-76 - 1971 transport aircraft
- Il-86 - 1976 airliner
- Il-96 - 1988 airliner
- Il-114 - 1990 regional airliner

=== Experimental ===
Military aircraft

- I-21 - 1936 fighter
- Il-1 - 1944 fighter
- Il-6 - 1943 bomber
- Il-8 - 1943 ground-attack aircraft
- Il-16 - 1945 ground-attack aircraft
- Il-20 - 1948 ground-attack aircraft
- Il-22 - 1947 bomber
- Il-30 - tactical bomber
- Il-40 - 1953 ground-attack aircraft
- Il-46 - 1952 bomber
- Il-54 - 1955 bomber
- Il-102 - 1982 ground-attack aircraft
- Il-106 - proposed military transport aircraft

Civilian aircraft

- Il-18 (1946) - 1946 airliner
- Il-108 - proposed business jet

=== Planned ===
- Il-112 - planned military transport aircraft
- Il-214 - planned military transport aircraft

=== Gliders ===
- Il-32 - 1948 transport glider

== Lavochkin ==
=== Production ===
- LaGG-3 - 1940 fighter
- La-5 - 1942 fighter
- La-7 - 1944 fighter
- La-9 - 1946 fighter
- La-11 - 1947 fighter
- La-15 - 1948 fighter

=== Experimental ===
- LaGG-1 - 1940 fighter
- La-126 - 1946 fighter
- La-150 - 1946 fighter
- La-152 - 1946 fighter
- La-160 - 1947 fighter
- La-168 - 1948 fighter
- La-190 - 1951 fighter
- La-200 - 1949 fighter
- La-250 - 1956 interceptor

=== Unmanned aerial vehicles ===
- La-17 - 1953 unmanned aerial vehicle

== Mikoyan ==
Mikoyan, also known as Mikoyan-Gurevich, is a renowned Soviet aircraft manufacturer founded in 1939 by Artem Mikoyan and Mikhail Gurevich. They produced some of the most iconic fighter jets in aviation history. The MiG-15, which gained fame during the Korean War, and later models like the MiG-21 and MiG-29, were celebrated for their speed, agility, and advanced technology. Besides their well-known production planes, Mikoyan also developed experimental aircraft to explore new aviation technologies. They had several innovative designs that were planned but never fully realized. Additionally, Mikoyan worked on unmanned aerial vehicles, contributing to the development of military drones. This diverse range of projects underscores Mikoyan's significant impact on military aviation history.Some information about Soviet-era fighter jets.

=== Production ===
- MiG-1 - 1940 fighter
- MiG-3 - 1940 fighter and interceptor
- MiG-9 - 1946 fighter
- MiG-15 - 1947 fighter
- MiG-17 - 1950 fighter
- MiG-19 - 1952 fighter
- MiG-21 - 1956 fighter and interceptor
- MiG-23 - 1967 fighter and fighter-bomber
- MiG-25 - 1964 interceptor and reconnaissance aircraft
- MiG-27 - 1970 ground-attack aircraft
- MiG-29 - 1977 air superiority fighter and multirole fighter
  - MiG-29M - improved multirole fighter variant of the MiG-29
    - MiG-29K - 1988 all-weather carrier-based multirole fighter
- MiG-31 - 1975 interceptor
- MiG-35 - 2009 multirole fighter

=== Experimental ===
Military aircraft

- DIS - 1941 escort fighter
- MiG-6 - ground-attack aircraft
- MiG-8 - 1945 liaison aircraft
- I-211 - 1943 fighter
- I-250 - 1945 fighter
- I-270 - 1946 interceptor
- I-320 - 1949 all-weather interceptor
- I-350 - 1951 fighter
- I-3 - 1956 fighter
- I-7 - 1957 interceptor
- I-75 - 1958 interceptor
- Ye-8 - 1962 fighter
- Ye-150 family - 1959 interceptor
- MiG-105 - 1976 test vehicle
- MiG-33 - proposed light strike fighter
- MiG-AT - 1996 advanced trainer and light attack aircraft
- Project 1.44 - 2000 technology demonstrator

Civilian aircraft

- MiG-110 - 1995 passenger and cargo aircraft

=== Planned ===
- LMFS - projected stealth light multirole fighter
- MiG-41 - projected interceptor

=== Unmanned aerial vehicles ===
- Skat - proposed unmanned combat aerial vehicle

== Myasishchev ==
=== Production ===
Military aircraft

- M-4 - 1953 strategic bomber
- M-55 - 1978 high-altitude reconnaissance aircraft
- VM-T - 1981 military transport aircraft

Civilian aircraft

- M-101T - 1995 passenger aircraft

=== Experimental ===
- M-18 - proposed bomber
- M-50 - 1959 strategic bomber
- M-60 - proposed bomber

== Sukhoi ==
=== Production ===
Military aircraft

- Su-2 - 1937 reconnaissance aircraft and light bomber
- Su-7 - 1955 fighter and fighter-bomber/ground-attack aircraft
- Su-9 - 1956 interceptor
- Su-11 - 1958 interceptor
- Su-15 - 1962 interceptor
- Su-17 - 1966 fighter-bomber
- Su-24 - 1967 all-weather attack aircraft
- Su-25 - 1975 close air support aircraft
- Su-27 - 1977 multirole fighter and air superiority fighter
- Su-30 - 1989 multirole fighter
  - Su-30MKI - 1997 multirole air superiority fighter
  - Su-30MKK - 2000 all-weather strike fighter
  - Su-30MKM - 2007 air superiority fighter and multirole fighter
- Su-33 - 1987 carrier-based air superiority fighter and multirole fighter
- Su-34 - 1990 fighter-bomber and strike fighter
- Su-35 - 1988 multirole air superiority fighter
- Su-57 - 2010 stealth air superiority fighter

Civilian aircraft

- Su-26 - 1984 aerobatic aircraft
- Su-29 - aerobatic aircraft
- Su-31 - 1992 aerobatic aircraft
- Su-80 - 2001 transport aircraft
- Superjet 100 - 2008 regional jet

=== Experimental ===
Military aircraft

- Su-1 - 1940 fighter
- Su-6 - 1941 ground-attack aircraft
- Su-8 - 1944 ground-attack aircraft
- Su-9 (1946) - 1946 fighter
- Su-10 - 1946 bomber
- Su-12 - 1947 reconnaissance aircraft
- Su-15 (1949) - 1949 all-weather interceptor
- Su-17 (1949) - 1949 fighter
- Su-28 - trainer
- Su-37 - 1996 multirole fighter
- Su-47 - 1997 technology demonstrator
- T-3 - 1956 interceptor
- T-4 - 1972 reconnaissance aircraft and strategic bomber
- P-1 - 1957 interceptor
- T-60S - 1984 bomber
- S-54 - trainer, light fighter and carrier-capable light fighter

Civilian aircraft

- Su-38 - 2001 agricultural aircraft
- S-21 - business jet
- KR-860 - 2000 airliner

=== Planned ===
- FGFA - stealth air superiority fighter
- Superjet 130 - airliner

== Tupolev ==
=== Production ===
Military aircraft

- ANT-3 - 1925 reconnaissance aircraft
- ANT-7 - 1929 reconnaissance aircraft
- TB-1 - 1925 heavy bomber
- I-4 - 1927 fighter
- TB-3 - 1930 heavy bomber
- MTB-1 - 1934 maritime patrol flying boat
- DB-1 - 1934 bomber
- SB - 1934 fast bomber
- Tu-2 - 1941 medium bomber
- Tu-4 - 1947 strategic bomber
- Tu-14 - 1949 torpedo bomber
- Tu-16 - 1952 strategic bomber
- Tu-22 - 1959 medium bomber
  - Tu-22M - 1969 strategic bomber
- Tu-28 - 1964 interceptor
- Tu-95 - 1952 strategic bomber
- Tu-126 - 1962 airborne early warning and control aircraft
- Tu-142 - 1968 maritime patrol and anti-submarine warfare aircraft
- Tu-160 - 1981 strategic bomber

Civilian aircraft

- ANT-9 - 1929 airliner
- ANT-35 - 1936 airliner
- Tu-104 - 1955 airliner
- Tu-114 - 1957 airliner
- Tu-124 - 1960 airliner
- Tu-134 - 1963 airliner
- Tu-144 - 1967 airliner
- Tu-154 - 1968 airliner
- Tu-204 - 1989 airliner

=== Experimental ===
Military aircraft

- ANT-1 - 1923 experimental aircraft
- ANT-8 - 1931 maritime patrol flying boat
- ANT-10 - 1930 reconnaissance aircraft and light bomber
- ANT-16 - 1933 heavy bomber
- ANT-21 - 1933 fighter
- ANT-22 - 1934 reconnaissance flying boat
- ANT-25 - 1933 experimental aircraft
- ANT-29 - 1935 fighter
- ANT-37 - 1935 bomber
- ANT-41 - 1936 torpedo bomber
- TB-6 - heavy bomber
- I-8 - 1930 fighter
- I-12 - 1931 fighter
- I-14 - 1933 fighter
- MTB-2 - 1937 bomber flying boat
- Tu-1 - 1947 night fighter
- Tu-8 - 1947 bomber
- Tu-12 - 1947 medium bomber
- Tu-72 - medium bomber
- Tu-73 - 1947 medium bomber
- Tu-75 - 1950 transport aircraft
- Tu-80 - 1949 strategic bomber
- Tu-82 - 1949 light bomber
- Tu-85 - 1951 strategic bomber
- Tu-91 - 1955 attack aircraft
- Tu-95LAL - 1961 experimental nuclear-powered strategic bomber
- Tu-98 - 1956 bomber
- Tu-107 - 1958 transport aircraft
- Tu-125 - bomber
- Tu-155 - 1988 experimental alternative fuel testbed
- Tu-2000 - strategic bomber

Civilian aircraft

- ANT-2 - 1924 passenger transportation aircraft
- ANT-14 - 1931 airliner
- ANT-20 - 1934 airliner
- Tu-70 - 1946 airliner
- Tu-102 - airliner
- Tu-110 - 1957 airliner
- Tu-116 - 1957 airliner
- Tu-244 - transport
- Tu-334 - 1999 airliner

=== Planned ===
- Frigate Ecojet - airliner
- PAK DA - strategic bomber
- Tu-324 - regional jet
- Tu-330 - transport aircraft
- Tu-444 - business jet

=== Unmanned aerial vehicles ===
Production

- Tu-123 - 1960 reconnaissance unmanned aerial vehicle
- Tu-141 - 1974 reconnaissance unmanned aerial vehicle
- Tu-143 - 1970 reconnaissance unmanned aerial vehicle

Experimental

- Tu-121 - 1959 unmanned aerial vehicle
- Voron - reconnaissance unmanned aerial vehicle

== Yakovlev ==
=== Production ===
Military aircraft

- AIR-6 - 1932 light utility aircraft
- UT-1 - 1936 trainer
- UT-2 - 1937 trainer
- Yak-1 - 1940 fighter
- Yak-2 - 1939 light bomber
- Yak-3 - 1941 fighter
- Yak-4 - 1940 light bomber
- Yak-6 - 1942 utility transport aircraft
- Yak-7 - 1940 trainer and fighter
- Yak-9 - 1942 fighter
- Yak-10 - 1944 light liaison aircraft
- Yak-11 - 1945 trainer
- Yak-12 - 1946 liaison and utility aircraft
- Yak-15 - 1946 fighter
- Yak-17 - 1947 fighter
- Yak-18 - 1946 trainer
- Yak-18T - 1967 trainer and aerobatic aircraft
- Yak-23 - 1947 fighter
- Yak-25 - 1952 interceptor and reconnaissance aircraft
- Yak-27 - 1960 interceptor and reconnaissance aircraft
- Yak-28 - 1958 tactical bomber, reconnaissance aircraft, electronic warfare aircraft, interceptor, trainer
- Yak-38 - 1971 carrier-based fighter
- Yak-52 - 1976 trainer
- Yak-130 - 1996 advanced trainer and light attack aircraft
- Yak-152 - 2016 basic trainer

Civilian aircraft

- AIR-1 - 1927 biplane
- AIR-3 - monoplane
- AIR-5 - 1931 monoplane
- AIR-7 - aerobatic aircraft
- Yak-32 - 1960 aerobatic aircraft
- Yak-40 - 1966 regional jet
- Yak-42 - 1975 airliner
- Yak-50 (1975) - 1975 aerobatic aircraft
- Yak-54 - 1993 aerobatic aircraft
- Yak-55 - 1981 aerobatic aircraft
- Yak-58 - 1993 utility transport aircraft
- Yak-112 - 1992 utility aircraft

=== Experimental ===
Military aircraft

- UT-3 - 1938 trainer
- Yak-5 - 1944 trainer
- Yak-8 - 1944 utility aircraft
- Yak-16 - 1947 light transport aircraft
- Yak-19 - 1947 fighter
- Yak-20 - 1949 trainer
- Yak-25 (1947) - 1947 interceptor
- Yak-26 - 1956 tactical bomber
- Yak-30 (1948) - 1948 interceptor
- Yak-30 (1960) - 1960 trainer
- Yak-33 - fighter, bomber and reconnaissance aircraft
- Yak-36 - 1963 technology demonstrator
- Yak-43 - fighter
- Yak-44 - carrier-based airborne early warning and control aircraft
- Yak-45 - air superiority fighter
- Yak-46 - airliner
- Yak-50 (1949) - 1949 all-weather and night interceptor
- Yak-53 - 1982 trainer
- Yak-140 - fighter
- Yak-141 - 1987 fighter
- Yak-200 - 1953 multi-engine trainer
- Yak-1000 - technology demonstrator
- VVP-6 -

Civilian aircraft

- Yak-48 - business and regional jet
- Yak-77 - business and regional jet

=== Unmanned aerial vehicles ===
- Pchela - 1990 surveillance unmanned aerial vehicle

=== Gliders ===
- Yak-14 - 1948 military transport glider/ fighter

=== Helicopters ===
Production

- Yak-24 - 1952 transport helicopter

Experimental

- EG - 1947 experimental helicopter
- Yak-60 - transport helicopter
- Yak-100 - 1948 transport helicopter

== Mil ==
=== Helicopters ===
Production

- Mil Mi-24
- Mil Mi-28
- Mil Mi-8
- Mil Mi-17
- Mil Mi-6
- Mil Mi-26
- Mil Mi-2
- Mil Mi-4

== Bibliography ==
- Gordon, Yefim (2008). Soviet Air Power in World War 2. Hinckley, UK: Midland Publishing. ISBN 978-1-85780-304-4.
