= USAF/DoD reporting names =

Names assigned by U.S. military to Soviet aircraft

Before the NATO ASCC reporting names became widely used, the USAF and United States Department of Defense applied their own system of allocating code names on newly discovered Soviet aircraft. Each item was given a type number sequentially, but it soon became obvious that the system was impractical over a long period of time, being abandoned in 1955, in favour of the NATO ASCC reporting name system.

Some aircraft that were allocated USAF DoD type numbers were never allocated NATO reporting names. Inconsistencies in contemporary published lists have led to presumed re-allocations, predicated on research using contemporary Soviet documents by Helge Bergander.

The US DoD also assigned codes to newly discovered Soviet or Chinese aircraft and equipment, which had not yet been identified, consisting of code for the site it was first identified, and a sequential letter.

== USAF/DoD preliminary aircraft identification ==
Following are USAF/DoD aircraft type numbers and NATO reporting names. Where there are two entries for a type, the source is noted as either "Bergander" or "published" (details in citation).

| Type | NATO | Common name |
|---|---|---|
| 1 | Fargo | Mikoyan-Gurevich MiG-9 |
| 2 | Feather | Yakovlev Yak-15 |
| 3 | | Lavochkin La-150 |
| 4 | | Lavochkin La-152 |
| 5 | | Lavochkin La-156 |
| 6 | | Lavochkin La-160 Strelka |
| 7 | | Yakovlev Yak-19 |
| 8 | | Sukhoi Su-9 (1946) |
| 9 | | Tupolev Tu-12 |
| 10 | | Ilyushin Il-22 |
| 11 | | Mikoyan-Gurevich I-270 |
| 12 | | Tupolev Tu-73 |
| 13 | | Yakovlev Yak-25 (1947) (Bergander) |
| 13 | | (not allocated in contemporary published lists) (published) |
| 14 | Fagot | Mikoyan-Gurevich MiG-15 |
| 15 | | Lavochkin La-168 |
| 16 | Feather | Yakovlev Yak-17 |
| 17 | | Tupolev Tu-82 (Bergander) |
| 17 | | Sukhoi Su-11 (1947) (published) |
| 18 | | Sukhoi Su-15 (1949) (Bergander) |
| 18 | | Mikoyan-Gurevich I-320 (published) |
| 19 | Fagot | Mikoyan-Gurevich SP-1 (MiG-15bisP) (Bergander) |
| 19 | Kennel | KS-1 Kometa (air-to-surface missile, DOD code AS-1) (published) |
| 20 | | Yakovlev Yak-30 (1948) (Bergander) |
| 20 | Fresco | Mikoyan-Guryevich MiG-17 (published) |
| 21 | Fantail | Lavochkin La-15 |
| 22 | Colt | Antonov An-2 (Bergander) |
| 22 | Bat | Tupolev Tu-2R / (Tupolev Tu-6) (published) |
| 23 | | Sukhoi Su-12 |
| 24 | Mare | Yakovlev Yak-14 (Bergander) |
| 24 | | Yakovlev Yak-10 (published) |
| 25 | Mist | Tsybin Ts-25 |
| 26 | Magnet | Yakovlev Yak-17UTI |
| 27 | Beagle | Ilyushin Il-28 |
| 28 | Flora | Yakovlev Yak-23 |
| 29 | Midget | Mikoyan-Guryevich MiG-15UTI |
| 30 | Mascot | Ilyushin Il-28U |
| 31 | Barge | Tupolev Tu-85 |
| 32 | Hare | Mil Mi-1 |
| 33 | Mole | Beriev Be-8 |
| 34 | Madge | Beriev Be-6 |
| 35 | Bosun | Tupolev Tu-14 |
| 36 | Hound | Mil Mi-4 |
| 37 | Bison | Myasishchev M-4 |
| 38 | Horse | Yakovlev Yak-24 (published) |
| 38 | Fresco | Mikoyan-Gurevich MiG-17 (Bergander) |
| 39 | Badger | Tupolev Tu-16 |
| 40 | Bear | Tupolev Tu-95 |

== DoD preliminary codes ==
Soviet sites
| Code | Site |
| CASP | Caspian Sea |
| KAZ | Kazan |
| NOVO | GAZ-153 factory airfield (Novosibirsk) |
| RAM | Gromov Flight Research Institute, Ramenskoye, Moscow Oblast |
| SIB | Chaplygin Siberian Scientific Research Institute Of Aviation (Novosibirsk) |
| TAG | Taganrog (Black Sea) |

Chinese sites
| Code | Site |
|---|---|
| HARB | Harbin |
| NAN | Nanchang |
| XIAN | Xi'an |

Aircraft
| DoD code | Common name | NATO codename |
|---|---|---|
| CASP-A | Alexeyev KM | |
| CASP-B | Alexeyev A-90 Orlyonok | |
| KAZ-A | Tupolev Tu-22M0 | Backfire |
| NOVO-A | | |
| NOVO-B | | |
| NOVO-C | Sukhoi T-60S | |
| RAM-A | | (Note: The RAM-A through RAM-F block most likely includes Sukhoi T6-1, Sukhoi T6-IG and Sukhoi T-4.) |
| RAM-B | | |
| RAM-C | | |
| RAM-D | | |
| RAM-E | | |
| RAM-F | | |
| RAM-G | Yakovlev Yak-38 | Forger |
| RAM-H | Tupolev Tu-144 | Charger |
| RAM-J | Sukhoi T-8 (later Su-25) | Frogfoot |
| RAM-K | Sukhoi T-10 (later Su-27) | Flanker |
| RAM-L | Mikoyan MiG-29 | Fulcrum |
| RAM-M | Myasishchev M-17 Stratosfera | Mystic |
| RAM-N | Ilyushin Il-102 | |
| RAM-P | Tupolev Tu-160 | Blackjack |
| RAM-Q | | (possibly not assigned) |
| RAM-R | Buran | (Note: RAM-R1 applied to the Buran structural test article, RAM-R2 to the jet-powered Buran aerodynamic test vehicle.) |
| RAM-S | | |
| RAM-T | Yakovlev Yak-141 | Freestyle |
| SIB-A | Sukhoi FSW testbed (Sukhoi S-37) | |
| TAG-A | Beriev/Bartini VVA-14 | |
| TAG-B | | (Note: Candidates for TAG-B and TAG-C are the Alekseyev KM and Alekseyev A-90 Orlyonok Ekranoplans (WiG-Wing in Ground effect) vehicles, also allocated CASP-A and CASP-B.) |
| TAG-C | | |
| TAG-D | Beriev A-40 | Mermaid |
| HARB-A | Harbin SH-5 | |
| NAN-A | (small transport aircraft) | |
| NAN-B | (small fighter prototype) | |
| XIAN-A | Shenyang J-8-I | Finback |

== US DoD preliminary codes for research and prototype missiles ==
This designation system is similar to the system used for prototype aircraft, but instead of sequential letters, numerical sequences are used.

Soviet and Russian test ranges
| Code | Site |
|---|---|
| BL | Barnaul (Air Force) |
| EM | Embi-5 (Air Defence) |
| KY | Kapustin Yar |
| NE | Nenoska (Navy) |
| PL | Plesetsk |
| SH | Sary Shagan |
| TT | Tyuratam |
| VA | Vladimirovska |

Chinese test ranges
| Code | Site |
|---|---|
| SC | Shuang Cheng Tzu Missile and Space Test Facility |

Missiles
| Code | Common name | NATO codename |
|---|---|---|
| BL-01 | | |
| BL-02 | | |
| BL-03 | | |
| BL-04 | | |
| BL-05 | | |
| BL-06 | | |
| BL-07 | | |
| BL-08 | | |
| BL-09 | | |
| BL-10 | M25A Meteorit-A | AS-X-19 Koala |
| EM-01 | | |
| KY-01 | R-1/8K11 | SS-1A (unconfirmed) |
| KY-02 | R-11/8K14 | SS-1B (unconfirmed) |
| KY-02 | R-2/8Zh38 | SS-2 (unconfirmed) |
| KY-02 | R-5 Pobeda | SS-3 (unconfirmed) |
| KY-03 | R-17 Elbrus | SS-1C/D Scud-B/C |
| KY-04 | R-12/8K63 | SS-4 (unconfirmed) |
| KY-05 | R-14/8K65 | SS-5 (unconfirmed) |
| KY-06 | 9M76 | SS-12 (unconfirmed) |
| KY-07 | RT-15/8K96 | SS-X-14 (unconfirmed) |
| KY-08 | | |
| KY-09 | | (erroneous identification of SS-NX-13) |
| KY-10 | | |
| KY-11 | 9M76 | SS-22 (unconfirmed) |
| KY-12 | 9M79 Tochka | SS-21 Scarab |
| NE-01 | | |
| NE-02 | | |
| NE-03 | | |
| NE-04 | R-39 Rif | SS-N-20 Sturgeon |
| PL-01 | RT-20 | SS-X-15 Scrooge |
| PL-02 | | |
| PL-03 | | |
| PL-04 | RT-23 | SS-24 Scalpel |
| PL-05 | RT-2PM Topol (15Zh58) | SS-25 Sickle |
| SH-01 | A-350Zh | ABM-1A Galosh |
| SH-02 | | |
| SH-03 | | |
| SH-04 (Note: The SH-04 code may be in error. It is possible that the A350R was also given the SH-01 code of the A350Zh.) | A-350R | ABM-1B Galosh |
| SH-05 | | |
| SH-06 | | |
| SH-07 | | |
| SH-08 | 53T6 | ABM-3 Gazelle |
| SH-09 | | |
| SH-10 | | |
| SH-11 | 51T6 | ABM-4 Gorgon |
| TT-01 | | |
| TT-02 | | |
| TT-03 | | |
| TT-04 | | |
| TT-05 | N-1 | SL-15 |
| TT-06 | | |
| TT-07 | | |
| TT-08 | | |
| TT-09 | 9K720 Iskander | SS-X-26 (Note: The SS-X-26 code for the RSS-40 was later cancelled and reassigned to the 9M72 missile.) |
| VA-01 | | |
| VA-02 | | |
| VA-03 | | |
| VA-04 | | |
| VA-05 | | |
| VA-06 | | |
| VA-07 | (SRAM-type missile, mid-1980s; probably Kh-15) | |
| VA-08 | (Air-launched antiship cruise missile, mid-1980s) | |
