= Yakovlev Yak-30 =

Yakovlev Yak-30 may refer to either:

- Yakovlev Yak-30 (1948), a Soviet interceptor aircraft
- Yakovlev Yak-30 (1960), a Soviet military trainer aircraft
