= Sukhoi Su-9 (1946) =

Experimental fighter aircraft

Su-9
- Sukhoi Su-9 (1946)

General information
- Type: Fighter aircraft
- National origin: Soviet Union
- Manufacturer: Sukhoi
- Status: Cancelled
- Primary user: Soviet Air Forces
- Number built: 2

History
- First flight: 13 November 1946

The Sukhoi Su-9 (Russian: Самолёт K, lit. 'Aircraft K'; USAF/DoD designation: Type 8) was an early jet fighter built in the Soviet Union shortly after World War II. The design began in 1944 and was intended to use Soviet-designed turbojet engines. The design was heavily influenced by captured German jet fighters and it was subsequently redesigned to use a Soviet copy of the German Jumo 004 turbojet. The Su-9 was slower than competing Soviet aircraft and it was cancelled as a result. A modified version with different engines and a revised wing became the Su-11 (Samolyot KL), but this did not enter production either. The Su-13 (Samolyot KT) was a proposal to re-engine the aircraft with Soviet copies of the Rolls-Royce Derwent turbojet as well as to modify it for night fighting, but neither proposal was accepted.

== Design and development ==
=== Su-9 ===
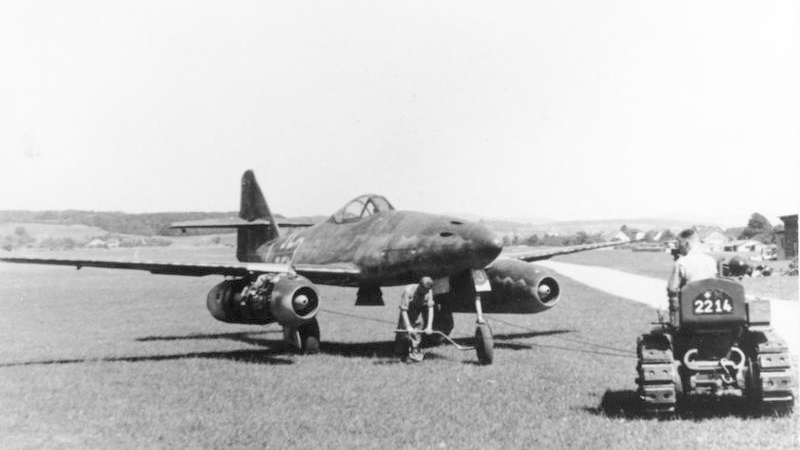
The Su-9 was likely influenced by the Messerschmitt Me 262

In 1944, the Sukhoi design bureau (OKB) began designing a twin-engined fighter powered by two Lyulka TR-1 turbojets, known internally as the Samolyet or Izdeliye (item or product) K. The ultimate design was very probably influenced by a captured Messerschmitt Me 262, but the Su-9 was not a copy of the German aircraft. The Su-9 had an oval cross-section, all-metal stressed skin monocoque fuselage that housed a single cockpit. The pilot was protected by armor plates to his front, an armored seat back and a bulletproof windscreen for the bubble canopy. He was provided with an ejection seat, copied from that used in the Heinkel He 162. The aircraft carried a total of 1,350 kilograms (2,980 lb) of fuel in two bladder tanks, one each ahead and behind the pilot. The low-mounted, straight wing had a single-spar and a slight dihedral of 4°20'. The outer flaps were split and could act as air brakes. The Su-9 was the first Soviet aircraft to use hydraulic-powered controls. A Soviet copy of the Junkers Jumo 004B turbojet, known as the RD-10, was hung under each wing in a streamlined nacelle. The aircraft had a tricycle undercarriage that retracted into the fuselage. The Su-9 was designed with a very high wing loading which increased the aircraft's speed and reduced its dimensions. This consequently increased the take-off and landing speeds so it was equipped with a provision for two JATO bottles (11.27 kN (530 lbf) thrust for 8 seconds) mounted on the sides of the fuselage. These reduced the take-off distance by nearly 50 percent and a braking parachute was fitted to reduce the landing distance.

The nose housed the armament of one 37-millimeter (1.5 in) Nudelman N-37 autocannon and two 23-millimeter (0.91 in) Nudelman-Suranov NS-23 autocannon. The N-37 could be replaced by a 45-millimeter (1.8 in) Nudelman-Suranov NS-45. The aircraft carried 100 rounds for each NS-23 and 40 rounds for the N-37. Two 250-kilogram (550 lb) FAB-250 high explosive bombs could be carried underneath the forward fuselage, but the N-37 had to be dismounted to do so.

As the TR-1 engines originally intended for the Su-9 were not yet ready for flight testing in late 1945, Pavel Sukhoi suggested substituting a pair of Jumo 004 engines and this was approved on 15 December. The full-scale mockup was found to be acceptable on 16 February 1946 and the Council of People's Commissars issued an order on 26 February that the manufacturer's flight testing was to begin on 1 November. This goal was not met because the OKB was heavily committed to other projects like the trainer version of the Tupolev Tu-2 bomber, inexperience with JATO units, and late delivery of RD-10 engines. The first prototype was completed in mid-October and made its first flight on 13 November. The test pilots found the aircraft easy to fly, but the control forces were very high at speed and it lacked enough directional stability. Enlarging the vertical stabilizer cured this last problem and hydraulic boosters were fitted for the control system.

The aircraft was revealed to the general public on 3 August 1947 at a flypast at Moscow's Tushino Airfield and the aircraft began its state acceptance trials three days later. Flight testing was completed by 25 May 1948 after 136 flights had been completed. It demonstrated a top speed of 885 kilometers per hour (550 mph) at an altitude of 8,000 meters (26,250 ft) and an endurance of one hour and 44 minutes. It had very docile handling qualities with one engine inoperative. The aircraft was recommended for production, but it was significantly slower than the Mikoyan-Gurevich MiG-9 and Yakovlev Yak-15. The government declined to do so and the program was terminated.

A two-seat trainer version, the Su-9UT, was planned during 1946, but it too was cancelled. The cockpit for the student would have been positioned ahead of the instructor's cockpit and each would have had a separate canopy. The armament would have been reduced to a pair of 20 millimeters (0.79 in) Berezin B-20 autocannon, each with a hundred rounds of ammunition. The armor would have been removed to save weight.

=== Su-11 ===
Another prototype was begun in 1946, but this aircraft was intended to use the Yakovlev-designed version of the afterburning RD-10F engine. However, wind tunnel testing of the Su-9 in September revealed that drag could be reduced if the engine nacelles were mounted in the wing rather than underneath it, and the wing tips were redesigned to use a different airfoil that significantly reduced Mach tuck. These changes required that the entire wing be redesigned; the wing spar was bent into an inverted U to accommodate the engines and slotted flaps replaced the simple flaps previously used. The tailplane was given a 5° dihedral to move it out of the engine exhaust.

Before the prototype was finished, Sukhoi was ordered to use the Lyulka TR-1 turbojets originally intended for the Su-9. This aircraft was designated the Su-11 and was called Samolyet KL by the OKB. Each TR-1 developed only 12.7 kN (2,865 lbf) thrust each, rather than the 15 kN (3300 lbf) required. The aircraft made its first flight on 28 May 1947 and also participated in the flypast at Tushino in August. It had a maximum speed of 940 km/h (580 mph) at sea level, but flight testing revealed that it lacked longitudinal stability at high speeds. Modifications of the wing/nacelle fillets and lengthening the engine nacelles failed to cure these problems. Coupled with the unavailability of mature TR-1 engines, these problems caused the program to be cancelled.

=== Su-13 ===
The Su-13, (Samolyet KT), was the final attempt to further increase performance of the basic Su-9 design, using wing sections reduced from 11% to 9% thickness/chord ratio and swept tailplanes. The aircraft was also fitted with a pair of Klimov RD-500 (unlicensed copies of the Rolls-Royce Derwent) engines with 15.6 kN (3,500 lbf) thrust each. The armament was changed to three 37 mm Nudelman N-37 cannon, while drop tanks could be fitted underneath the wingtips. A night fighter version with a Torii radar was also proposed, but this required major structural changes to accommodate the radar. Neither version made it off the drawing board.

== Operators ==
Soviet Union

- Soviet Air Force

== Variants ==
- Su-9UT – Planned two-seat trainer version, never built.
- Su-11 (Samolyet KL) – Modified Su-9 with new wings and Lyulka TR-1 engines. One prototype built.
- Su-13 (Samolyet KT) – Su-9 with Klimov RD-500 engines. Night fighter version also proposed. Neither version was built.

== Specifications (Su-9) ==
Su-9

Data from Early Soviet Jet Fighters

General characteristics

- Crew: 1
- Length: 10.546 m (34 ft 7 in)
- Wingspan: 11.2 m (36 ft 9 in)
- Height: 3.4 m (11 ft 2 in)
- Wing area: 20.2 m^{2} (217 sq ft)
- Airfoil: TsAGI S-10 (11%)
- Empty weight: 4,060 kg (8,951 lb)
- Gross weight: 5,890 kg (12,985 lb)
- Fuel capacity: 1,350 kg (2,980 lb)
- Powerplant: 2 × RD-10 turbojets, 9 kN (2,000 lbf) thrust each

Performance

- Maximum speed: 885 km/h (550 mph, 478 kn)
- Maximum speed: Mach 0.72
- Range: 1,200 km (750 mi, 650 nmi)
- Service ceiling: 12,800 m (42,000 ft)

Armament

- 1 × 37 mm (1.457 in) Nudelman N-37 autocannon with 40 rounds or 1 × 45 mm Nudelman-Suranov NS-45
- 2 × 23 mm (0.906 in) Nudelman-Suranov NS-23 autocannons (200 rounds per gun; 400 rounds total)
- Up to 500 kg (1,100 lb) of bombs

== See also ==
Aircraft of comparable role, configuration, and era

- Messerschmitt Me 262
- Gloster Meteor
