= Yakovlev Yak-19 =

Soviet prototype fighter aircraft

Yak-19
- A Yak-19 in flight

General information
- Type: Fighter aircraft
- Manufacturer: Yakovlev
- Designer: Alexander Yakovlev
- Status: Prototype
- Number built: 2

History
- First flight: 8 January 1947

The Yakovlev Yak-19 (Russian: Як-19, USAF/DOD designation Type 7) was a prototype Soviet fighter built in the late 1940s. It was the first Soviet aircraft to be equipped with an afterburning turbojet, the Klimov RD-10F that was derived from the German Jumo 004 engine. Only two examples were built as it was rejected for service by the Soviet Air Force.

== Development and description ==
In April 1946, the Council of People's Commissars ordered several design bureaux (OKB Russian: Опытное конструкторское бюро – Opytnoye Konstruktorskoye Buro), included that of Alexander Yakovlev, to develop a single-seat jet fighter to be equipped with a single Lyulka TR-1 turbojet engine. The aircraft should have a maximum speed of 850 kilometers per hour (528 mph) at sea level and a speed of 900 km/h (559 mph) at an altitude of 5,000 meters (16,400 ft). It should be able to climb to that altitude in 3.8 minutes or less and should have a maximum range of no less than 700 kilometers (430 mi). Yakovlev and his team were well aware that any derivative of their earlier Yak-15 and Yak-17 fighters, then under development, could not reach the required speed because of their thick wings and chose to begin a "clean-slate" design. Preliminary work used the same "pod-and-boom" layout as had been used in the earlier Yakovlev designs, although the cockpit was located in front of the engine. The TR-1 engine was plagued by delays and Yakovlev devoted most of his efforts to designs that used the RD-10.

By late June, Yakovlev had decided to use a more aerodynamically efficient "tubular" layout with the engine buried in the center of the fuselage. After it became clear that neither the TR-1, nor the imported British Rolls-Royce Nene or Rolls-Royce Derwent engines would be available to power the prototypes, Yakovlev settled on the newly available afterburning version of the RD-10. The first prototype was ordered to a very demanding schedule and was completed on 29 November 1946.

The Yak-19 had a flattened oval-shaped, metal semi-monocoque fuselage with the single-seat cockpit and its teardrop-shaped canopy positioned just forward of the 1,100 kgf (11 kN; 2,400 lbf) axial-flow RD-10F turbojet engine. Its air intake was in the nose and the afterburner was positioned at the rear of the fuselage, just below the tail structure. Fitted with tricycle landing gear, the main landing gear retracted inwards into the fuselage while the nose gear retracted forwards. The laminar-flow, two-spar, straight wing was mounted in the middle of the fuselage. It was equipped with modified Fowler flaps and Frise ailerons. The rudder was split into two sections by the horizontal stabilizers; the upper portion was fabric-covered while the lower half was metal-skinned. The pilot was protected by a bulletproof windscreen, a forward armor plate and an armored seat back. In addition, he was provided with an ejection seat. The Yak-19 was equipped with four fuel tanks in the fuselage that had a total capacity of 650 kilograms (1,430 lb) of fuel. It was armed with two 23-millimeter (0.9 in) Nudelman-Suranov NS-23 autocannon, each with 70 rounds.

== Testing ==
The day after the first prototype was completed, it was trucked to Khodynka Field to begin taxiing trials. On 12 December it caught fire when a defective fuel gasket blew out; the repairs took a fortnight. Immediately before its maiden flight, a pair of experimental 23 mm Shpitalny Sh-3 autocannon replaced the NS-23s. It first flew on 8 January 1947 with Lieutenant Colonel Mikhail Ivanov, at the controls, although he was not the primary test pilot. The Yak-19 was grounded from 2 March to 18 May as it awaited a new engine. On 21 May, the afterburner was tested in flight for the first time. While the fighter was the first Soviet aircraft to be equipped with an afterburner, it was not the first one to use one in flight as the Aircraft 156 had done so over a month earlier. The second prototype first flew on 6 June and was almost identical with the first prototype. Changes included five degrees of dihedral to the horizontal stabilizer, a slightly revised vertical stabilizer and plumbing for a pair of 195-liter (43 imp gal; 52 U.S. gal) drop tanks underneath the wingtips. This increased the fighter's total fuel load to 980 kilograms (2,160 lb).

During the manufacturer's flight tests, the Yak-19 became the first Soviet aircraft to exceed 900 km/h. Major Sergei Anokhin was the primary test pilot and reported that the aircraft had pleasant and predictable flying characteristics and presented no difficulties for the average pilot. Before the testing was completed, Anokhin led the jets participating in the flypast at Tushino Airfield on 3 August.

State acceptance tests began on 17 October, using the second prototype, and finished on 30 January 1948. The group of military test pilots concluded that the afterburner was unreliable and the aircraft was difficult to control in roll. Other complaints were focused on the cockpit; it was deemed was too small and lacked sufficient armor and heating or ventilation. They decided that the Yak-19 could not be recommended for service. Rather than modify the aircraft to address these problems, Yakovlev chose to cancel it entirely in favor of designs using the more-powerful (1,500 kgf (15 kN; 3,300 lbf)) Rolls-Royce Derwent-derived Klimov RD-500, like his Yak-23 and Yak-25 fighters then under development.

== Specifications (Yak-19) ==

Data from Early Soviet Jet Fighters

General characteristics

- Crew: 1
- Length: 8.36 m (27 ft 5 in)
- Wingspan: 8.72 m (28 ft 7 in)
- Wing area: 13.56 m^{2} (146.0 sq ft)
- Empty weight: 2,151 kg (4,742 lb)
- Gross weight: 3,400 kg (7,496 lb)
- Fuel capacity: 650 kg (1,430 lb) (internal), 973 kg (2,145 lb) (with drop tanks)
- Powerplant: 1 × Klimov RD-10F axial-flow turbojet, 10.79 kN (2,425 lbf) thrust with afterburner

Performance

- Maximum speed: 907 km/h (564 mph, 490 kn) at 5,250 m (17,220 ft)
- Range: 580 km (360 mi, 310 nmi)
- Ferry range: 970 km (600 mi, 520 nmi) with drop tanks at altitude of 8,000 m (26,000 ft)
- Service ceiling: 12,100 m (39,700 ft)
- Rate of climb: 23 m/s (4,500 ft/min) at sea level
- Time to altitude: 5,000 m (16,000 ft) in 4 minutes
- Wing loading: 226 kg/m^{2} (46 lb/sq ft)
- Thrust/weight: 0.36

Armament

- Guns: 2 × 23 mm (0.91 in) Shpitalny Sh-3 autocannon with 70 rounds per gun

== See also ==
Related development

- Yakovlev Yak-25

Aircraft of comparable role, configuration, and era

- Bell XP-83
- Chance-Vought F6U Pirate
- de Havilland Vampire
- Grumman F9F Panther
- Hawker Sea Hawk
- McDonnell F2H Banshee
- North American FJ-1 Fury
- Republic F-84
- Supermarine Attacker

Related lists

- List of fighter aircraft
- List of military aircraft of the Soviet Union and CIS

== Bibliography ==
- Gordon, Yefim & Kommissarov, Dmitry. Early Soviet Jet Fighters. Manchester, UK: Hikoki Publications, 2014. ISBN 978-1-902109-35-0.
