= Lavochkin La-15 =

Fighter aircraft in the Soviet Air Force

La-15
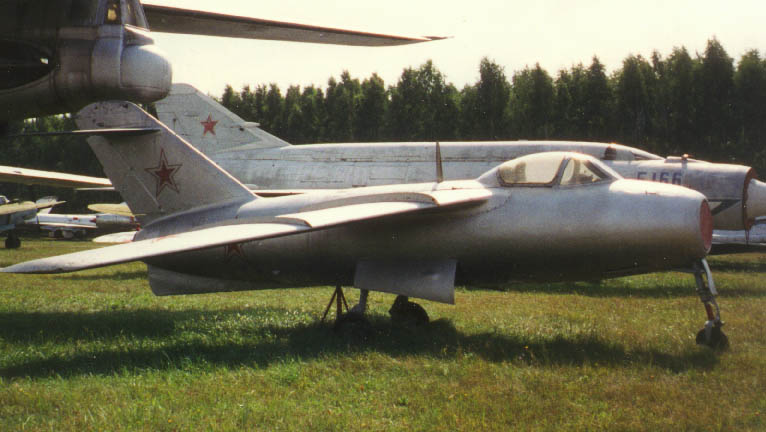
- La-15 at Central Air Force Museum, Monino

General information
- Type: Fighter
- Manufacturer: Lavochkin / Plant 21 "Sokol"
- Primary user: Soviet Air Force
- Number built: 235

History
- Introduction date: 1949
- First flight: January 8, 1948 (Aircraft 174)
- Retired: 1953
- Developed from: Lavochkin La-168

The Lavochkin La-15 (Plant 21 product code Izdeliye 52, USAF reporting name Type 21, NATO reporting name Fantail) is an early Soviet jet fighter and a contemporary of the Mikoyan-Gurevich MiG-15 which was in service with the Soviet Air Force from 1949 till 1953.

== Design and development ==
Lavochkin had produced a line of prop powered fighters in World War II. The Lavochkin La-150 was its first response to a 1945 order to build a single-seat jet fighter using a single German Junkers Jumo 004 turbojet from the Me 262. The Lavochkin La-152 which flew in December 1946 moved the engine to the front of the nose, which reduced thrust loss. The Lavochkin La-160 was the first Soviet fighter to apply swept wings, and flew in June 1947.

The Lavochkin La-168 first flew on April 22, 1948. It was designed to use the new turbojet based on the Rolls-Royce Nene in response to a 1946 request for an advanced swept-wing jet fighter capable of transonic performance. The engine was placed behind the pilot, but with a high-mounted wing and T-tail compared to the similar MiG-15.

The La-15 which reached mass production was the outcome of a series of development aircraft that began with the Aircraft 150 bomber in 1945 and culminated in Aircraft 176, later in 1948. These aircraft were designed for British engines, Rolls-Royce Derwent V and Rolls-Royce Nene, acquired by the Soviets in 1947 and then copied as the Klimov RD-500 and Klimov RD-45 respectively. The Derwent-powered Aircraft 174 was designed as a backup for the main program, the Nene-powered Aircraft 168, in case the British failed to deliver more powerful Nene engines with afterburners (which they did fail to deliver). The first prototype of Aircraft 174 was flown just 9 days after its counterpart the Mikoyan-Gurevich I-310, on January 8, 1948. The first prototype was however lost on May 11, 1948 due to vibrations. Trials were continued with an improved second prototype, designated Aircraft 174D, which underwent State Acceptance Tests from August to September 25, 1948. In comparison with the Nene-powered MiG-15 it had almost the same maximum speed and better maneuverability, with somewhat reduced rate of climb. The type was ordered into production in September 1948, even while Aircraft 174D was undergoing flight trials, and given the official designation La-15 in April 1949.

The La-15 had a barrel-like fuselage, shoulder-mounted swept wings with 6 degrees anhedral, and stabilizers mounted high on the fin, almost a T-tail. It was popular with pilots because of its easy handling and reliability, and its pressurized cockpit was an advantage at high altitude. Nevertheless, official enthusiasm for the La-15 was mild, largely because it was a complex design that required complicated and expensive production tooling. Only 235 La-15s were built, serving with the Soviet Air Force until 1953.

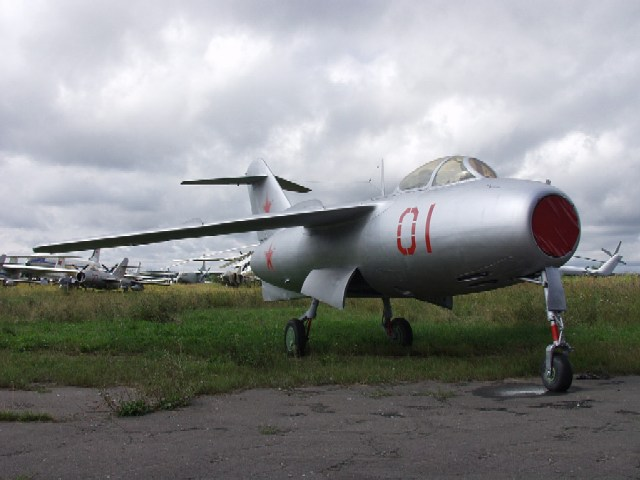
La-15 at Monino Airfield

== Operational history ==
The La-15 was tested operationally by the 192nd Fighter Wing, based at Kubinka from 19 March 1949, and began appearing in front-line combat units later the same year. One unit was seemingly the 196th Fighter Aviation Regiment. Introduction was accompanied by numerous accidents, but the competing MiG-15 design fared little better. However, although the La-15 had a number of technical advantages over the MiG-15, a combination of easier manufacture and lower costs led to the MiG-15 being favoured. The Soviet authorities decided to produce only one fighter, and they chose the MiG-15bis. The remaining La-15s in service were disarmed by 1953, and their engines reused on the KS-1 Komet air-to-surface missile. The aircraft were expended as targets at various nuclear bomb tests.

== Variants ==
Aircraft 174
Rolls-Royce Derwent powered first prototype of La-15. Crashed due to structural vibrations caused by sympathetic resonant frequencies of tailplane and rear fuselage.
Aircraft 174D
(Dooblyor-second)- Second prototype with modifications shown to be required from Aircraft 174's flight tests.
Aircraft 180
A two-seat trainer version was also developed as Aircraft 180 and was to be put into production as the UTI La-15 or La-15UTI, but as official interest in the La-15 waned, the trainer was cancelled before mass production began and only two were made.

== Operators ==
Soviet Union

- Soviet Air Force

== Surviving aircraft ==
An La-15 is on display at the Central Air Force Museum at Monino, outside of Moscow, Russia.

== Specifications (La-15) ==
Lavochkin LA-15 3-view drawing

Data from Lavochkins Last Jets

General characteristics

- Crew: 1
- Length: 9.56 m (31 ft 4 in)
- Wingspan: 8.83 m (29 ft 0 in)
- Height: 3.8 m (12 ft 5 in)
- Wing area: 16.167 m^{2} (174.02 sq ft)
- Empty weight: 2,575 kg (5,677 lb)
- Gross weight: 3,850 kg (8,488 lb)
- Fuel capacity: 1,060 L (230 imp gal)
- Powerplant: 1 × Klimov RD-500 centrifugal compressor turbojet, 16 kN (3,500 lbf) thrust

Performance

- Maximum speed: 1,007 km/h (626 mph, 544 kn) at 8,000 m (26,000 ft)
- Range: 1,145 km (711 mi, 618 nmi) at 10,000 m (33,000 ft)
- Service ceiling: 13,500 m (44,300 ft) at nominal power - prone to surge at military power above 8,000 m (26,000 ft)
- Rate of climb: 31.7 m/s (6,240 ft/min)
- Time to altitude:
  - 5,000 m (16,000 ft) in 3.1 min
  - 10,000 m (33,000 ft) in 9 min
- Wing loading: 238 kg/m^{2} (49 lb/sq ft)
- Thrust/weight: 0.42
- Takeoff distance: 650 m (2,130 ft)
- Landing distance: 800 m (2,600 ft)

Armament

- Guns: 3 × 23mm Nudelman-Suranov NS-23 autocannon with 100 rounds per gun

== See also ==
Related development

- Aircraft 168
- Aircraft 176

Aircraft of comparable role, configuration, and era

- MiG-15
- FMA IAe 33 Pulqui II
- Yakovlev Yak-25 (1947)
- Republic F-84F Thunderstreak
- North American F-86 Sabre

Related lists

- List of fighter aircraft
- List of military aircraft of the Soviet Union and the CIS
