= Yakovlev Yak-33 =

Yak-33

General information
- Type: VTOL fighter/bomber/reconnaissance aircraft
- Manufacturer: Yakovlev
- Status: Project only

The Yakovlev Yak-33 was a vertical takeoff and landing supersonic multi-purpose aircraft family, studied in the early 1960s, with variants of a basic design used to fulfill different roles, in a similar fashion to the Yak-25, Yak-27, Yak-28 family.

Several configurations were studied including canard and tailless deltas, however matching supersonic performance with VTOL ability seriously compromised the design's ability to carry out its primary missions.

== Specifications (Yak-33 estimated) ==
Data from OKB Yakovlev: A History of the Design Bureau and its Aircraft,

General characteristics

- Crew: 2
- Length: 27 m (88 ft 7 in)
- Wingspan: 11 m (36 ft 1 in)
- Gross weight: 32,000 kg (70,548 lb)
- Max takeoff weight: 40,000 kg (88,185 lb)
- Powerplant: 2 × Kolesov RD-36-41 vectored thrust afterburning turbojets, 68.67 kN (15,440 lbf) thrust each dry, 156.96 kN (35,290 lbf) with afterburner
- Powerplant: 6 or 8 × lift engines turbojets, 29.43 kN (6,620 lbf) thrust each

Performance

- Maximum speed: Mach 3
- Cruise speed: M2M2
- Range: 4,000 km (2,500 mi, 2,200 nmi)

Armament

- Bombs: Tactical nuclear weapons or conventional bombs
