= Yakovlev Yak-32 =

Soviet jet sporting aircraft prototype

Yak-32
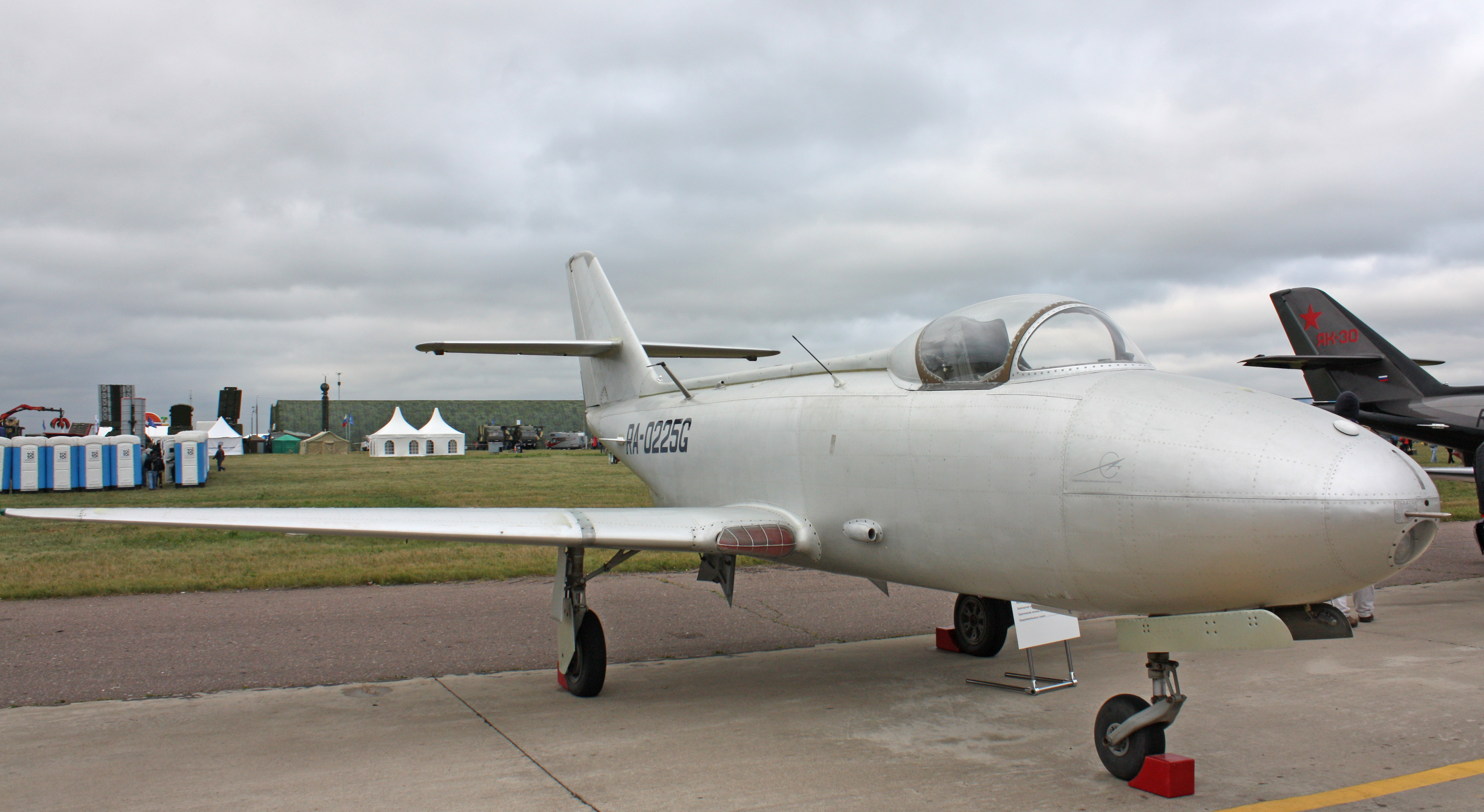
- Yak-32 on the MAKS airshow 2009

General information
- Type: Sport aircraft
- Manufacturer: Yakovlev
- Primary user: Soviet Air Forces
- Number built: 3

History
- First flight: 1960
- Variant: Yakovlev Yak-30 (1960)

The Yakovlev Yak-32 (NATO reporting name Mantis) is a single-seat version of the Yakovlev Yak-30 (1960), and was claimed by the OKB to be the world's first sporting aircraft with an ejection seat. This version was designated Yak-104PS. Neither the Yak-30 nor the Yak-32 entered production.

== Design and development ==
Developed concurrently with the Yak-30, the Yak-32 was a single-seat aircraft designed as both a sporting jet, and a light military ground attack aircraft. The airframe of the Yak-32 was that of the Yak-30, but modified to include only a single seat. Yakovlev had intended to market the aircraft as a sporting jet at a time when no other single-seat jet aircraft were being marketed for civilian use. In fact, it would not be until the introduction of the jet version of the Bede BD-5 in the 1970s that another sport aircraft like the Yak-32 was offered. Even in the 21st century, single-seat sporting jets are rarely offered by manufacturers.

The light attack version of the Yak-32 was designated Yak-32Sh, and was planned to include more sophisticated avionics than the Yak-32. It could also carry external fuel and weapons loads, including a ZB-500 or ZB-360 external fuel tank, bombs of up to 500 kg, up to four rocket launchers (the largest being the UB-32/S-5), up to four K-13/R-3S missiles, four ARS-240 rockets, or four AOI-9 or UKP-23 gun pods, each with 250 rounds.

On 5 August 1971, one of the Yak-32s was ordered to be equipped with RU19P-300 which has been modified to permit longer inverted flight. The aircraft received the designation Yak-32P. Flight evaluation of the aircraft was just as good as the original Yak-32.

== Operational history ==
Three Yak-32 prototypes were built in 1960—1961 at the same time as the four prototype Yak-30s trainers. They had callsigns 32, 60 and 70. The aircraft 30 and 70 gave aerobatic demonstrations at the 1961 Aviation Day at Tushino. They went on to set several world class records (their thrust being misreported to the FAI as 800 kg).

The ASCC allocated the name "Mantis" to the Yak-32/Yak-104.

== Surviving aircraft ==
- One Yak-32 was preserved by Yakovlev and is on display at Khodinka, displayed in the OKB's house colors of red and white.

== Specifications (Yak-32 No.1) ==
Data from

General characteristics

- Crew: 1
- Capacity: 991 kg (2,185 lb) payload
- Length: 10.14 m (33 ft 3 in)
- Wingspan: 9.38 m (30 ft 9 in)
- Height: 3.4 m (11 ft 2 in)
- Wing area: 14.3 m^{2} (154 sq ft)
- Airfoil: S-9s
- Empty weight: 1,555 kg (3,428 lb)
- Max takeoff weight: 2,250 kg (4,960 lb)
- Fuel capacity: 480 kg (1,060 lb) internal fuel, 20 kg (44 lb) oil
- Maximum fuel capacity: 805 kg (1,775 lb)
- Powerplant: 1 × Tumansky RU19-300 turbojet engine, 10.51 kN (2,363 lbf) thrust

Performance

- Maximum speed: 660 km/h (410 mph, 360 kn) 767 km/h (477 mph; 414 kn) at 11,500 m (37,700 ft)
- Landing speed: 95 km/h (59 mph; 51 kn)
- Range: 965 km (600 mi, 521 nmi)
- Endurance: 2.05 hours
- Service ceiling: 11,500 m (37,700 ft) (record set at 16,128 m (52,913 ft))
- g limits: +7 -5
- Rate of climb: 18 m/s (3,500 ft/min)
- Wing loading: 154 kg/m^{2} (32 lb/sq ft)
- Thrust/weight: 0.36
- Take-off run: 425 m (1,394 ft)
- Landing run: 450 m (1,480 ft)

== See also ==
Related development

- Yakovlev Yak-30 (1960)

Aircraft of comparable role, configuration, and era

- L-29A Akrobat
- F-80 Shooting Star
- Bede BD-5
