= Yakovlev Yak-45 =

Yak-45

General information
- Type: Fighter
- National origin: Soviet Union
- Manufacturer: Yakovlev
- Status: Project only
- Number built: 0

Yakovlev Yak-45 was the designation for a planned fighter that was replaced by the Mikoyan MiG-29.

== Design and development ==
Yakovlev's entry of designs were submitted under the designation Yak-45 during the early 1970s. The design was rejected in favor of the MiG-29. Construction of the Yak-45 was resumed during the late 1970s. This aircraft was not developed because of the VTOL operation.

== See also ==
- Mikoyan MiG-29
- Saab Viggen
