= Yakovlev Yak-23 =

Fighter aircraft in the USSR

Yak-23
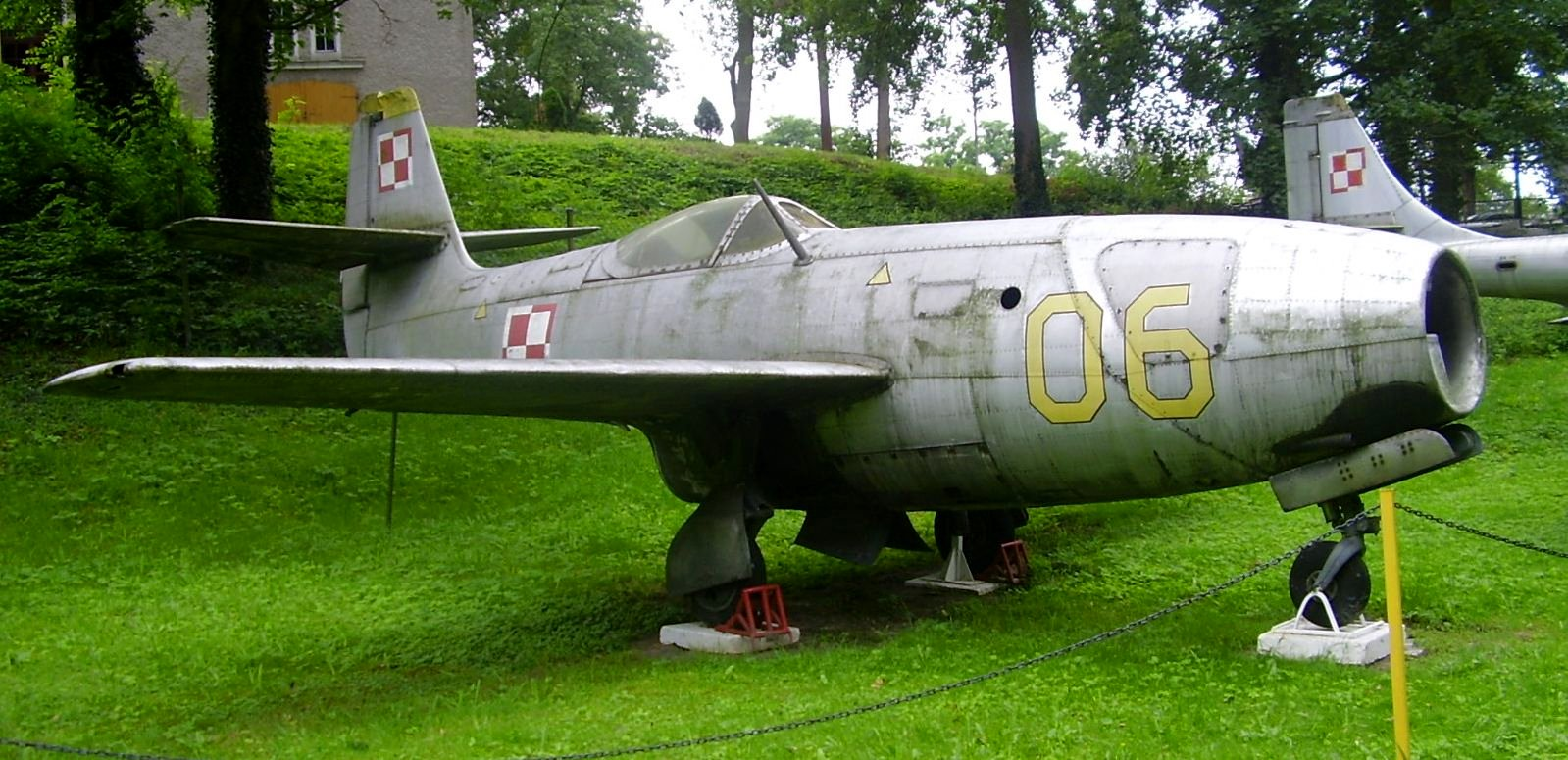
- Polish Yak-23 in the Lubuskie Muzeum Wojskowe, Drzonów

General information
- Type: Fighter aircraft
- Manufacturer: Yakovlev
- Primary users: Soviet Air Forces Polish Air Force; Romanian Air Force; Czechoslovak Air Force; Bulgarian Air Force
- Number built: 316 + 3 prototypes

History
- Manufactured: October 1949–January 1951
- Introduction date: 1949
- First flight: 8 July 1947
- Retired: Early 1960s
- Developed from: Yakovlev Yak-17

The Yakovlev Yak-23 (Russian: Яковлев Як-23; USAF/DoD reporting name Type 28, NATO reporting name Flora) is an early Soviet jet fighter with a straight wing. It was developed from the Yak-17 in the late 1940s and used a reverse-engineered copy of a British engine. It was not built in large numbers as it was inferior in performance to the swept-wing Mikoyan-Gurevich MiG-15. Many Yak-23s were exported to the Warsaw Pact nations and remained in service for most of the 1950s, although some were still in use a decade later.

== Development and description ==
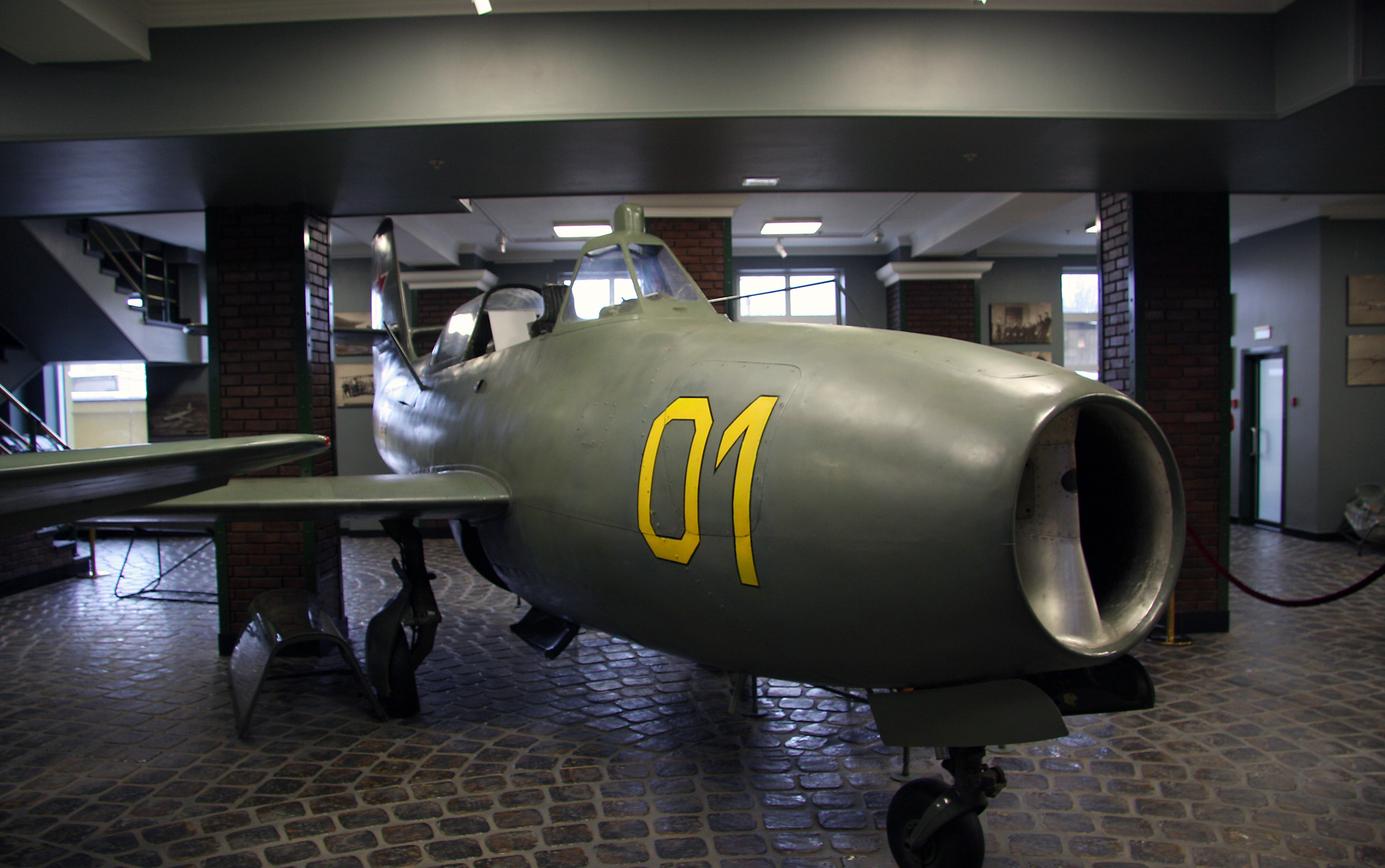
Yakovlev Yak-23UTI

On 11 March 1947, the Council of People's Commissars ordered several design bureaux (OKB), including that of Alexander Yakovlev, to develop a single-seat, straight-winged jet fighter to be equipped with a single British Rolls-Royce Nene or Rolls-Royce Derwent turbojet engine. The aircraft should have a maximum speed of 950 kilometers per hour (590 mph) at sea level and a speed of 1,000 km/h (621 mph) at an altitude of 5,000 meters (16,400 ft). It should be able to climb to that altitude in 3.5 minutes or less and should have a maximum range of no less than 1,200 kilometers (750 mi). Alexander Yakovlev decided to develop two designs, the Yakovlev Yak-25 in accordance with the Ministry's order and a lightweight, more agile aircraft (the Yak-23) in the hopes that one or the other would win an order from the Ministry. Yakovlev's decision was a risky one as it could be construed as unauthorized use of state funds if discovered, which could have landed Yakovlev in a lot of trouble.

To minimize risk, the new aircraft used the same "pod-and-boom" layout as the earlier Yak-17 fighter, but the metal fuselage was redesigned as a semi-monocoque structure with the single-seat, unpressurized cockpit and its teardrop-shaped canopy positioned just above the trailing edge of the wing. Not coincidentally, this was also above the exhaust of the 1,590-kilogram-force (15.6 kN; 3,500 lbf) centrifugal-flow Klimov RD-500 engine, an unlicensed copy of the Derwent V. Fitted with tricycle landing gear, the main landing gear retracted inwards into the fuselage while the nose gear retracted forwards. Unlike the installation in the Yak-17, the Yak-23's forward landing gear was flush with the fuselage when retracted. The laminar-flow, two-spar, wing was mounted in the middle of the fuselage. It was equipped with slotted flaps and ailerons and had a modest 3° 30' dihedral. The horizontal stabilizers had 5° of dihedral. The pilot was protected by a bulletproof windscreen and the armored back of the ejection seat. The Yak-23 was equipped with five non-self-sealing fuel tanks in the fuselage that had a total capacity of 910 liters (200 imp gal; 240 U.S. gal) of fuel. In addition it could carry a pair of 195-liter (43 imp gal; 52 U.S. gal) drop tanks under the wingtips. The fighter was armed with two 23-millimeter (0.9 in) Nudelman-Rikhter NR-23 autocannon, each with 90 rounds.

Two prototypes and a static-test airframe were ordered and the aircraft first flew on 8 July 1947 with the Hero of the Soviet Union, Lieutenant Colonel Mikhail Ivanov, at the controls. While still involved in its manufacturer's flight testing, the first prototype participated in the flypast at Tushino Airfield on 3 August. The Yakovlev OKB concluded its testing on 24 September and turned over the second prototype for state acceptance trials on 22 October. Although the Yak-23 was accepted for series production, it was criticized of heavy aileron and rudder forces, lack of cockpit pressurization and heating and ventilation, protection for the pilot and weak armament. The test pilots did praise it as highly maneuverable, with a good acceleration and takeoff and climb capabilities thanks to a high thrust-to-weight ratio. The second prototype was modified afterwards to address some of these issues and successfully tested again in 1948.

== Operational history ==
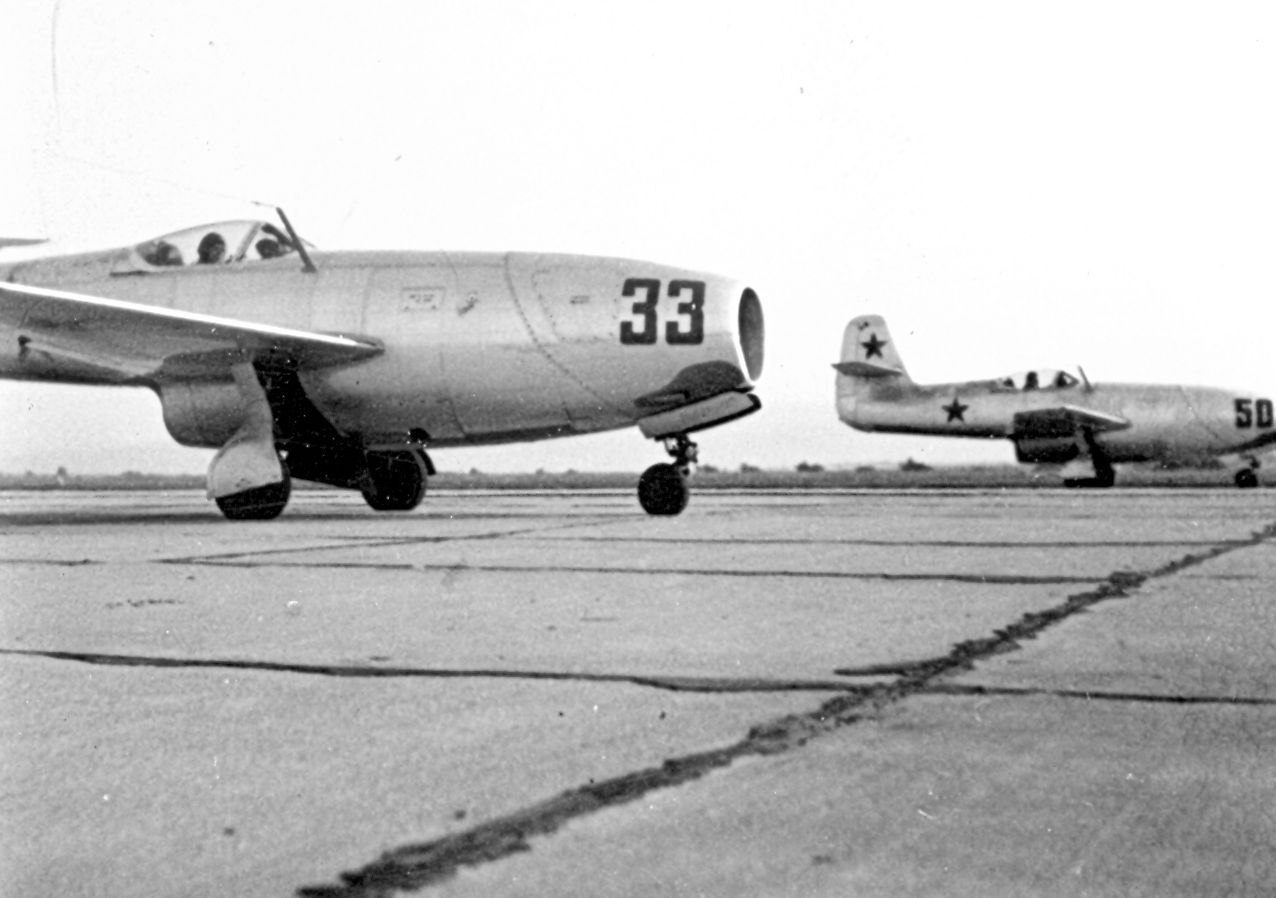
Romanian Yak-23s at Ianca

The first aircraft were produced in a factory in Tbilisi in October 1949. In late 1949 they entered Soviet air force service. The Yak-23 was quickly replaced in the Soviet service with the more complicated swept-wing MiG-15, which offered superior performance. In all, only 316 Yak-23 aircraft were built before production ended in 1951. Apart from the fighter there were two trainer versions of the Yak-23 which were built in small numbers. The Yak-23UTI two-seat trainer which appears to have had the unusual arrangement of having the instructor seated in front of the student, and the Yak-23DC trainer which was produced in Romania.

Small numbers of Yak-23s were exported to Czechoslovakia (20 from 1949, named S-101), Bulgaria (from 1949), Poland (about 100, from 1950), Romania (62, from 1951). Poland and Czechoslovakia acquired licenses for the aircraft, but built the superior MiG-15 instead. Yak-23s were withdrawn by the late 1950s, except in Romania which used them until 1960.

A Romanian Yak-23 flown by Major Dumitru Balaur successfully intercepted a Soviet Ilyushin Il-28 on the night of 28 October 1952. Being tracked from the ground on radar, the Il-28 was intercepted by the Yak-23 fighter scrambled from the Ianca airfield after it had passed into the Romanian airspace a second time. As the bomber refused to follow the Romanian pilot's instructions, the fighter moved into position to shoot it down but was recalled to base. This was the first interception mission carried out by the Romanian Air Force.

=== U.S. testing ===
A single Yak-23 was acquired by US intelligence via Yugoslavia in November 1953. The aircraft was a Romanian Yak-23 flown by Mihail Diaconu who had defected with it. The aircraft arrived disassembled and was shipped to the U.S. Air Force Test and Evaluation Center at Wright Field near Dayton, Ohio, in an operation known as Project Alpha. It was reassembled and made operational for several test flights, during which time it was disguised with U.S. markings. Efforts were made to keep the aircraft's identity secret and it was flown only in the early morning. On one occasion it was passed on the runway by a formation of F-86 Sabres whose pilots inquired as to the plane's identity. A story was conceived that the aircraft was a Bell X-5, which had a similar layout. At the completion of design and flight evaluations the aircraft was again disassembled and shipped quietly back to Yugoslavia in its original paint scheme.

=== Records ===
On September 21, 1957, the Polish pilot Andrzej Abłamowicz set two FAI world records in the Yak-23 with civilian markings SP-GLK, in its weight class, climbing to 3,000 m (9,843 ft) in 119 seconds (4,962.6 ft/min, 25,21 m/s) and to 6,000 m (19,685 ft) in 197 seconds (5,995.4 ft/min, 30,45 m/s). This plane was withdrawn in 1961.

== Variants ==
- Yak-23: Fighter version, serial built.
- Yak-23UTI: Two-seat training version with longer fuselage and lighter armament, three built.
- Yak-23DC: Romanian-built two-seat training version. Four Yak-23 single-seaters were converted in 1956 by ASAM Pipera, two of them belonging to the Bulgarian AF.
- S-101: Czechoslovak designation.

== Operators ==
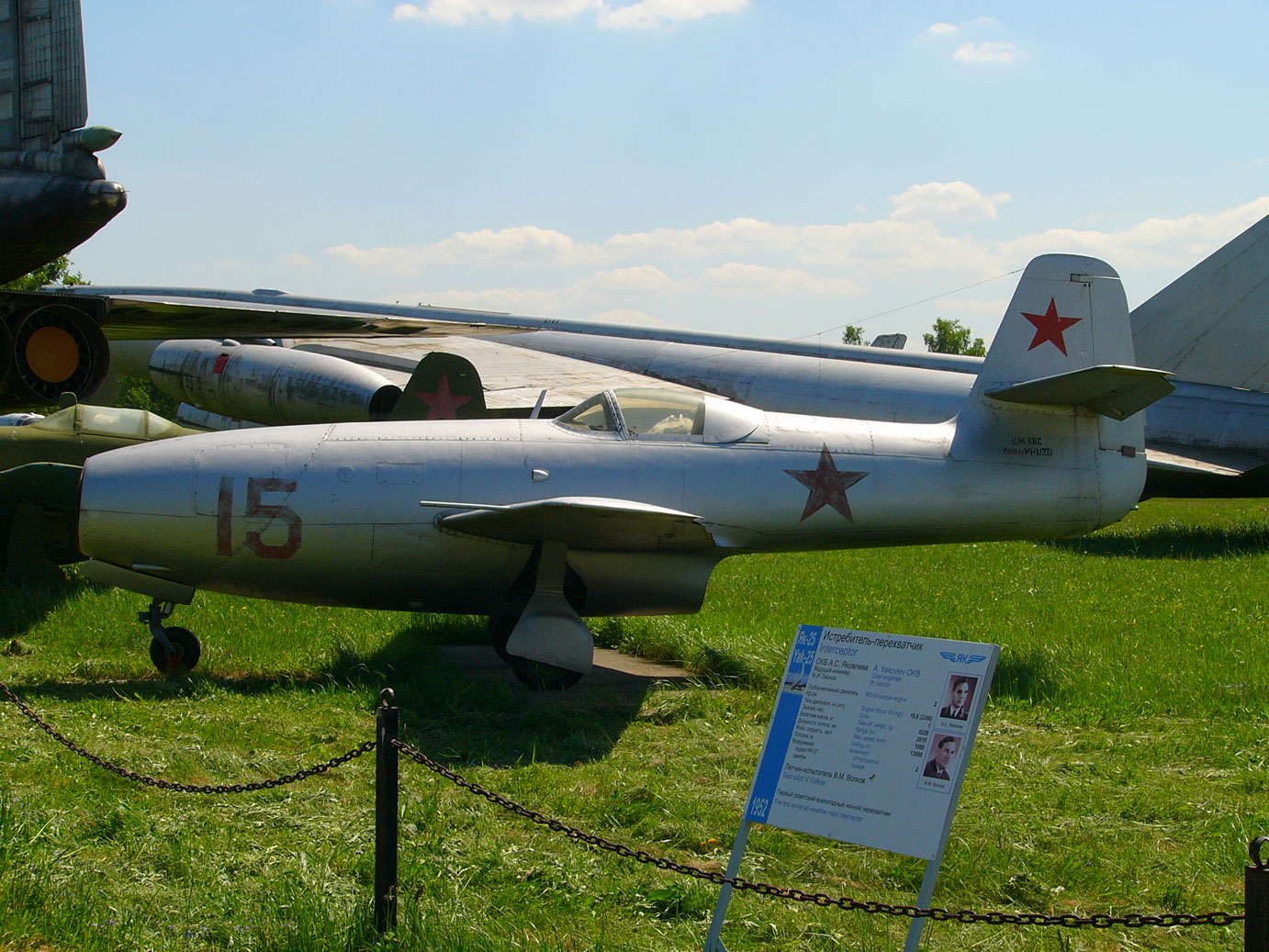
Yak-23 in the Russian Central Air Force Museum, Monino Airfield

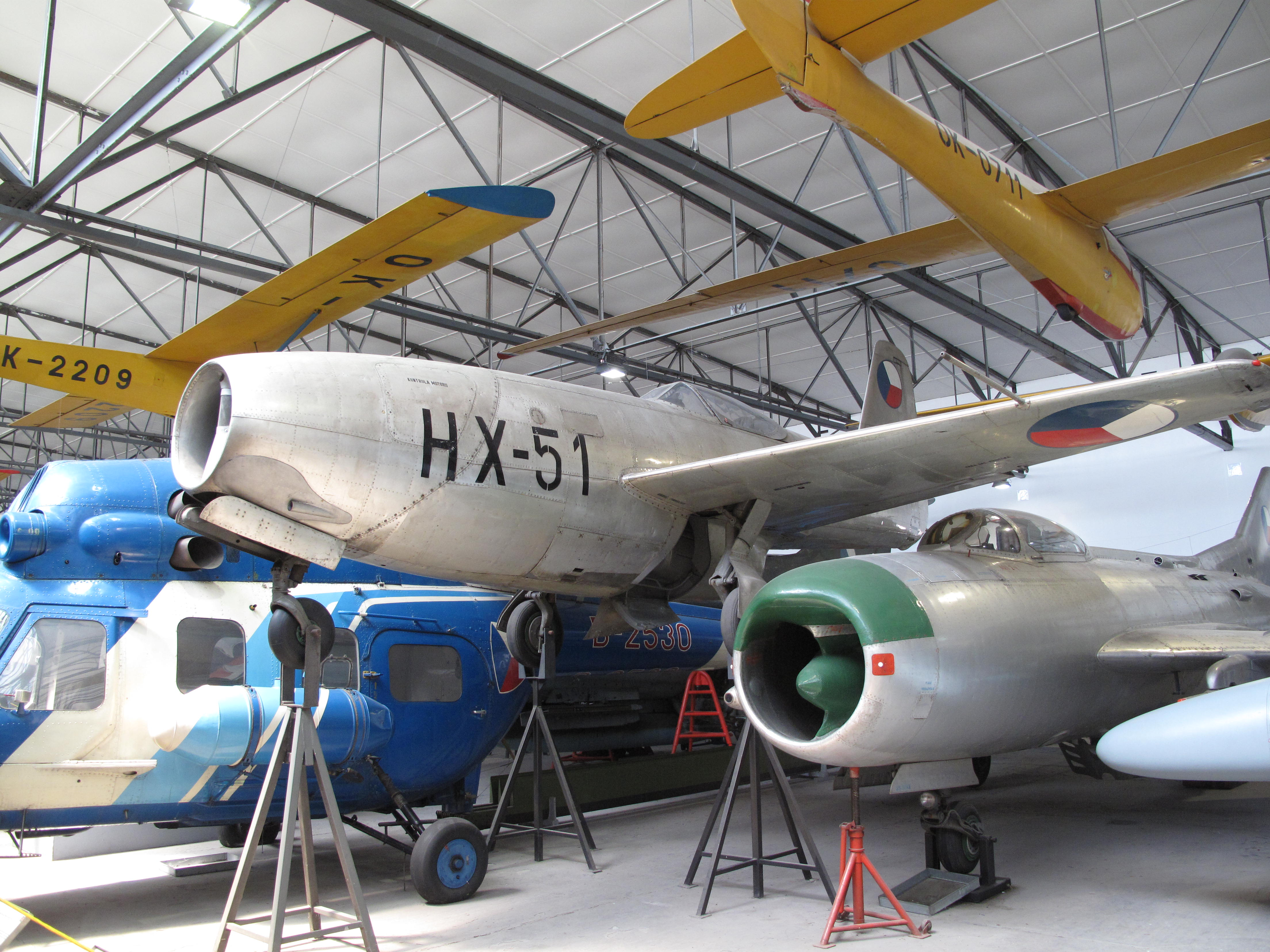
Czechoslovak Yak-23 at the Prague Aviation Museum, Kbely (marked HX-51)

Albania

- Albanian Air Force - The first aircraft was received in 1951.

Bulgaria

- Bulgarian Air Force - Received over 100 aircraft, used them until 1958.

Czechoslovakia

- Czechoslovak Air Force - Received 20 aircraft in 1949.

North Korea

- Korean People's Army Air Force - A small number were used in the Korean War.

Poland

- Polish Air Force - Received about 100 aircraft operated between 1950 and 1956.

Romania

- Romanian Air Force - Received 62 aircraft in 1951 and used them until 1960.

Soviet Union

- Soviet Air Force - Operated aircraft between 1949 and 1951.

== Specifications (Yak-23) ==
Yak-23 3-view drawing

Data from The Complete Book of Fighters

General characteristics

- Crew: 1
- Length: 8.13 m (26 ft 8 in)
- Wingspan: 8.73 m (28 ft 8 in)
- Height: 3.31 m (10 ft 10 in)
- Wing area: 13.5 m^{2} (145 sq ft)
- Empty weight: 1,980 kg (4,365 lb)
- Gross weight: 3,384 kg (7,460 lb)
- Powerplant: 1 × Klimov RD-500 centrifugal-flow turbojet engine, 15.6 kN (3,500 lbf) thrust

Performance

- Maximum speed: 925 km/h (575 mph, 499 kn) at sea level
- Range: 1,200 km (750 mi, 650 nmi)
- Service ceiling: 14,800 m (48,600 ft)
- Rate of climb: 47 m/s (9,300 ft/min)
- Thrust/weight: 0.46

Armament

- Guns: 2 × 23 mm Nudelman-Rikhter NR-23 with 90 rpg

== See also ==
Aircraft of comparable role, configuration, and era

- Mikoyan-Gurevich MiG-9

Related lists

- List of fighter aircraft
- List of military aircraft of the Soviet Union and CIS

== Bibliography ==
- Gordon, Yefim & Kommissarov, Dmitry. Early Soviet Jet Fighters. Manchester, UK: Hikoki Publications, 2014. ISBN 978-1-90210935-0.
- Green, William & Swanborough, Gordon.The Complete Book of Fighters. London: Salamander Books. 1994. ISBN 1-85833-777-1.
- Gunston, Bill. The Osprey Encyclopedia of Russian Aircraft 1875–1995. London: Osprey, 1995. ISBN 1-85532-405-9.
- Mikolajczuk, Marian. Yakovlev Yak-23: The First Yakovlev Jet Fighters. Sandomirez, Poland: Stratus, 2008. ISBN 978-83-89450-54-8.
