= Lavochkin La-168 =

Type of aircraft

La-168

General information
- Type: Fighter
- National origin: Soviet Union
- Manufacturer: Lavochkin
- Number built: 1

History
- First flight: 22 April 1948
- Developed from: Lavochkin La-160
- Variant: La-15

The Lavochkin La-168 was a jet fighter developed for the USSR. Like the better known Mikoyan MiG-15 which was ultimately selected and went on to become one of the most successful jet fighters of its era, the Lavochkin La-168 was designed in response to a 1946 request for an advanced swept-wing jet fighter capable of transonic performance. It was to use new turbojet based on the Rolls-Royce Nene in competition with the design bureaus of Artem Mikoyan and Mikhail Gurevich, and Aleksandr Yakovlev. A scaled down version of this aircraft would lead to the production of the La-15, which performed well but would be dropped in favor of the MiG-15.

== Design and development ==
Aircraft 168 was preceded by the Lavochkin La-160 jet fighter which was the first to utilize swept wing surfaces first researched by the Germans, but it moved the engine from the nose to behind the pilot. It resembled the Mikoyan MiG-15 and used the same cannon-armament and the Rolls-Royce Nene II engine. Unlike the MiG-15, the La-168 had shoulder mounted wings and a t-tail layout. Due to Lavochkin's decision to wait with La-168 development for the Nene II engine, the MiG-15, first flown with the less powerful Nene I, was available four months earlier, giving it a crucial advantage.

Aircraft 168's first flight was on April 22, 1948, with I. E. Fedorov at the controls. Trials continued until February 19, 1949, when testing of the cannons at high altitude caused the canopy to collapse, resulting in a nearly fatal crash. In the end, the Lavochkin fighter lost out to the competing MiG-15. Another 168 derivative was the La-176, the first Soviet plane to achieve supersonic flight (in a shallow dive) on December 26, 1948.

A scaled down version of this aircraft powered by a Rolls-Royce Derwent, was produced as Aircraft 174, prototype of the production La-15, which although well liked and having superior performance, was more expensive and harder to mass-produce than the MiG-15.

== Variants ==
- Aircraft 176 - One Aircraft 168 produced with 45° swept wings and tailplane. Believed to be first Soviet aircraft to exceed Mach 1.0 albeit in a dive. Crashed whilst supersonic when canopy collapsed.
- Aircraft 174 - A 0.9 scale version of aircraft 168 which was productionised as the La-15.

== Specifications (Aircraft 168) ==
Data from Lavochkins Last jets

General characteristics

- Crew: 1
- Length: 10.56 m (34 ft 8 in)
- Wingspan: 9.5 m (31 ft 2 in)
- Wing area: 18.08 m^{2} (194.6 sq ft)
- Aspect ratio: 5
- Empty weight: 3,111 kg (6,859 lb)
- Gross weight: 4,580 kg (10,097 lb)
- Powerplant: 1 × Klimov RD-45 Centrifugal compressor turbojet, 22.26 kN (5,000 lbf) thrust

Performance

- Maximum speed: 1,080 km/h (670 mph, 580 kn) at 5,000m (16,400ft)
- Maximum speed: Mach 0.95
- Range: 1,500 km (930 mi, 810 nmi) at 10,000m (32,810ft)
- Endurance: 2hr 12min
- Service ceiling: 13,000 m (42,650 ft)
- Rate of climb: 37.8 m/s (7,440 ft/min)
- Time to altitude: 5,000m in 2.2min
- Thrust/weight: 0.49

Armament

- 2 × 23 mm Nudelman-Suranov NS-23 autocannon
- 1 × 37 mm Nudelman N-37 cannon

== See also ==
Aircraft of comparable role, configuration, and era

- Mikoyan MiG-15

Related lists

- List of fighter aircraft
- List of military aircraft of the Soviet Union and the CIS

== Bibliography ==
- Gordon, Yefim. Lavochkin's Last Jets. Midland Publishing. Hinkley. 2007. ISBN 1-85780-253-5
