= Klimov RD-500 =

1947 Soviet turbojet engine

RD-500
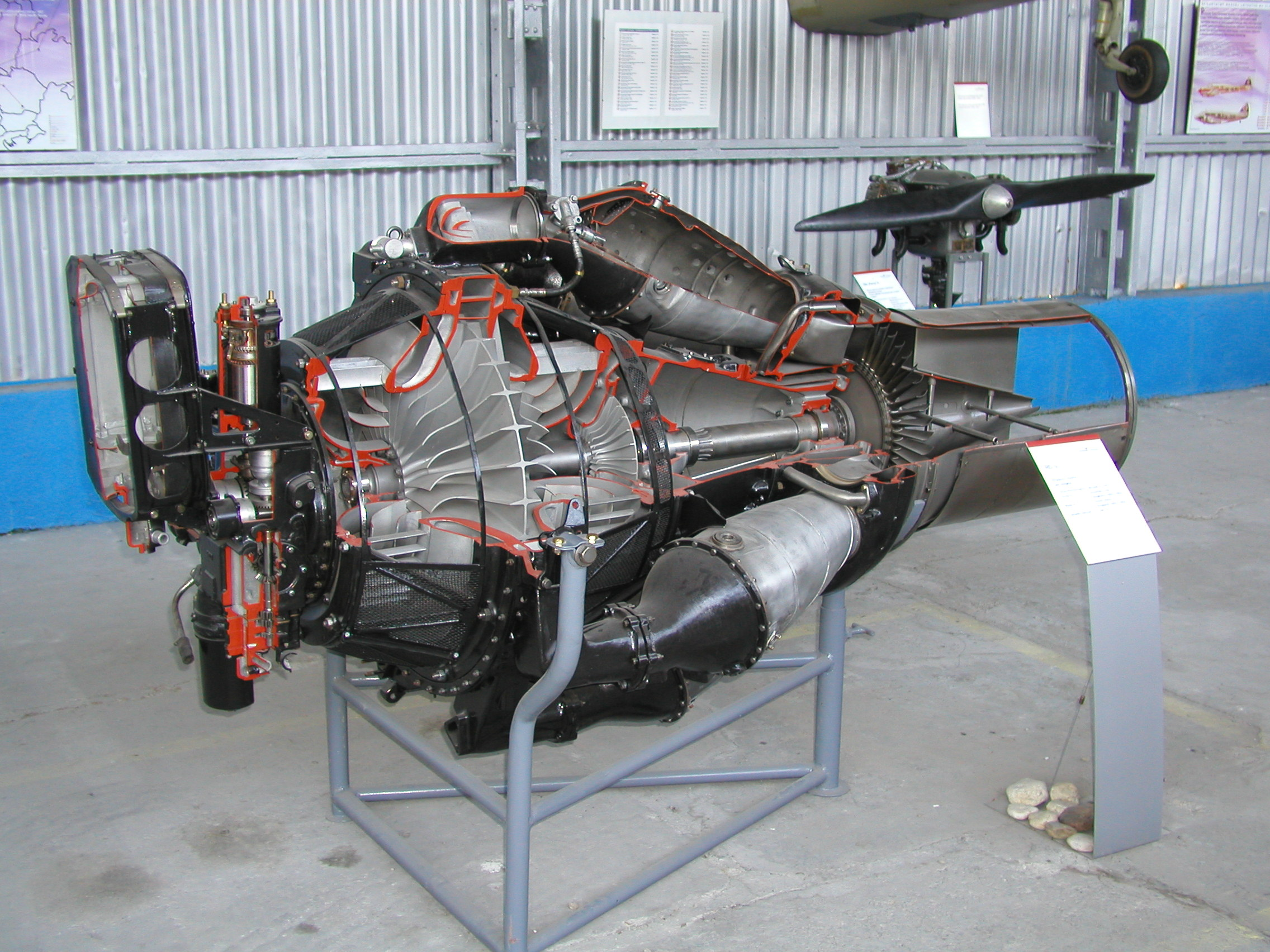
- Cutaway of RD-500 turbojet engine
- Type: Turbojet
- National origin: Soviet Union
- Manufacturer: Klimov
- First run: 31 December 1947
- Major applications: Yakovlev Yak-23
- Number built: about 859
- Developed from: Rolls-Royce Derwent V

The Klimov RD-500 was an unlicensed Soviet copy of the Rolls-Royce Derwent V turbojet that was sold to the Soviet Union in 1947. The Klimov OKB adapted it for Soviet production methods and materials.

== Development ==
Producing metric drawings and analyzing the materials used in the Derwent V went fairly quickly, but finding a substitute for the high-temperature, creep-resistant Nimonic 80 nickel-chromium alloy was a more difficult challenge. Eventually an alloy that matched Nimonic 80's high-temperature properties was found in KhN 80T, but it was not creep-resistant. The first Derwent V copy, designated as the RD-500 (Reaktivnyy Dvigatel' — jet engine) after Factory No. 500 where the engine was first produced, was being tested on 31 December 1947, but problems cropped up quickly. Combustion was uneven and this cracked the combustion chambers. This may have had something to do with the modifications made by the Soviets to the fuel, speed, and starter systems. But these problems were resolved by September 1948 when the engine passed its 100-hour State acceptance test.

RD-500 was a close copy of the Derwent with a single-stage centrifugal compressor, nine combustion chambers, and a single-stage turbine. It matched the Derwent's thrust of 15.9 kN (3,570 lb_{f}) and was only 13.7 kg (30 lb) heavier. The main problem with the engine in service was with its turbine blades, 30% of which failed inspection due to recrystallization after casting. The poor creep resistance of the KhN 80T alloy resulted in dangerous elongation of the turbine blades. Up to 40% of the early production RD-500s had to be individually adjusted before delivery and the service life of the engine never approached the 100 hours demonstrated in the acceptance test.

The Soviets had enormous problems building the engines to standard, as demonstrated in the 20,000 man-hours required to build a single engine in 1947. This figure dropped to a more reasonable 7,900 man-hours by November 1948 and declined further still to 4,734 man-hours by 1 March 1949, close to the target of 4,000 man-hours. Production by Factory No. 500 totaled 97 in 1948 and 462 in 1949. Factory No. 16 in Kazan was brought into the program and built 300 engines in 1949. Production was canceled around 1950 in favor of the superior Klimov VK-1 turbojet based on the Rolls-Royce Nene.

The RD-500 was used in a number of early Soviet jet fighters including the Lavochkin La-15, the Yakovlev Yak-25, and the Yakovlev Yak-30, but only the Yakovlev Yak-23, Yakovlev Yak-25 and Lavochkin La-15 were accepted for service.

The RD-500 was copied and developed further in the People's Republic of China (PRC) at the Shenyang Aircraft Development Office PF-1A.

== Applications ==
- Lavochkin La-15
- Mikoyan-Gurevich KSK test plane
- Raduga KS-1 Komet
- Yakovlev Yak-23
- Yakovlev Yak-25
- Yakovlev Yak-30
- Yakovlev Yak-1000

== Specifications (RD-500) ==
Data from Kay, Turbojet

==== General characteristics ====
- Type: Turbojet
- Length: 2.11 metres (6 ft 11 in)
- Diameter: 1.09 metres (3 ft 7 in)
- Dry weight: 580.7 kg (1,280 lb)

==== Components ====
- Compressor: Single-stage centrifugal compressor
- Combustors: Nine
- Turbine: Single-stage

==== Performance ====
- Maximum thrust: 15.9 kN (3,570 lbf)
- Specific fuel consumption: 1.4
- Thrust-to-weight ratio: 2.73

Related lists

- List of aircraft engines
