= Lavochkin La-160 =

Soviet swept-winged jet fighter research prototype

La-160 Strelka

General information
- Type: Jet Fighter
- National origin: U.S.S.R.
- Manufacturer: Lavochkin Design Bureau (OKB-301)
- Designer: Semyon Alekseyevich Lavochkin
- Number built: 1

History
- First flight: 23 July 1947
- Developed from: Lavochkin La-152
- Developed into: Lavochkin La-168

The Lavochkin La-160, known as Strelka (Arrow), was the first Soviet swept-winged jet fighter research prototype. It was designed and manufactured by the Lavochkin Design Bureau from 1946. USAF reporting name - Type 6

== Design and development ==
Aircraft 160 was an all-metal pod and boom style aircraft with tri-cycle undercarriage like the Lavochkin La-152 but its mid-set wings incorporated 35° sweep at 1/4 chord. The afterburning engine was underslung in the nose with the air intake at the extreme nose, and exhaust under the rear fuselage. The tricycle undercarriage was housed entirely within the fuselage, (almost all Lavochkin jet aircraft had a similar undercarriage arrangement) when retracted allowing the wing to be built thinner and lighter. A conventional tail layout with 35^{o} swept tailplane was located at the end of the tail boom. The swept wings were of very low taper (almost constant chord) with 1/2 span flaps/ailerons and two wing fences each side.

Although designed as a fighter, Aircraft 160 was intended for research into high-speed swept-wing flight, of which little was known in the mid-1940s - only the 1945-era light, piston-engined MiG-8 canard had used even a moderate degree of wing sweep before this. Following closely the layout of his previous jet-fighter prototypes Lavochkin was able to produce an aircraft capable of providing useful data and experience of high-speed flight near the speed of sound.

The first flight was on 24 June 1947. Successful flight trials were quickly followed by public display at the 1947 Aviation Day airshow at Tushino. Trials continued until Aircraft 160 broke up in flight, due to wing flutter, during tests to establish the maximum attainable speed. The experience gained with Aircraft 160 spurred on Soviet aircraft designers to design swept winged fighters, albeit cautiously.

The title 'Aircraft 160' was used previously by Lavochkin for a 'Heavy' twin engined fighter to be produced concurrently with Aircraft 150. This project was still-born, but led to the Alekseyev twin-engined I-21 series of fighters, after Alekseyev left Lavochkin's design bureau to head OKB-21 at Gor'kiy.

== Specifications (Aircraft 160) ==
Data from

General characteristics

- Crew: One
- Length: 10.06 m (33 ft 0 in)
- Wingspan: 8.95 m (29 ft 4 in)
- Height: 4.125 m (13 ft 6 in)
- Wing area: 15.9 m^{2} (170.96 sq ft)
- Empty weight: 2,738 kg (6,036 lb)
- Gross weight: 4,060 kg (8,950 lb)
- Powerplant: 1 × YuF afterburning RD-10 , 8.83 kN (1,984 lbf) thrust dry, 11.17 kN (2,510 lbf) with afterburner

Performance

- Maximum speed: 970 km/h (602 mph, 523 kn)
- Range: 1,000 km (621 mi, 540 nmi)
- Service ceiling: 12,000 m (40,030 ft)
- Rate of climb: 19.84 m/s (3,905 ft/min)

Armament

- 2 x 37mm cannon

== See also ==
- Lavochkin Aircraft 174TK

Aircraft of comparable role, configuration, and era

- Mikoyan-Guryevich I-310
- Yakovlev Yak-30

Related lists

- List of aircraft
- List of military aircraft of the Soviet Union and the CIS
