= Mikoyan-Gurevich MiG-9 =

Fighter aircraft family; first jet-powered MiG

MiG-9
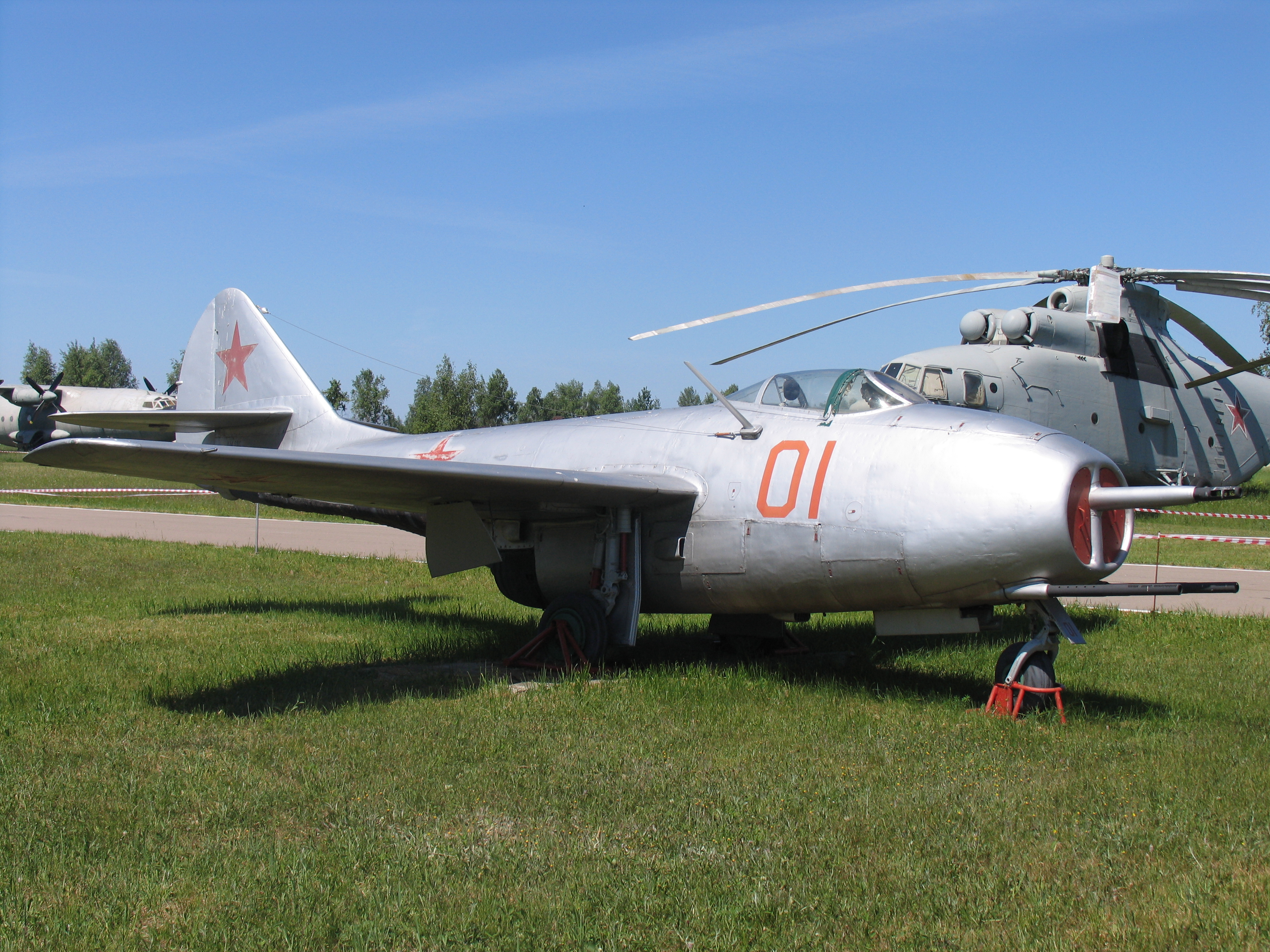
- Red 01 at the Central Air Force Museum, Monino, Russia

General information
- Type: Fighter aircraft
- National origin: Soviet Union
- Manufacturer: Mikoyan-Gurevich
- Status: Retired
- Primary users: Soviet Air Forces People's Liberation Army Air Force
- Number built: 610

History
- Manufactured: 1946–1948
- First flight: 24 April 1946

The Mikoyan-Gurevich MiG-9 (Russian: Микоян и Гуревич МиГ-9, USAF/DoD designation: Type 1, NATO reporting name: Fargo) was the first turbojet fighter developed by Mikoyan-Gurevich in the years immediately after World War II. It used reverse-engineered German BMW 003 engines. Categorized as a first-generation jet fighter, it suffered from persistent problems with engine flameouts when firing its guns at high altitudes due to gun gas ingestion. Multiple different armament configurations were tested, but none solved the problem. Several different engines were evaluated, but none were flown, as the prototype of the MiG-15 promised superior performance.

In total, 610 aircraft were built, including prototypes, and they entered service in 1948 with the Soviet Air Forces. At least 372 were transferred to the People's Liberation Army Air Force in 1950 to defend Chinese cities against air raids by the Nationalist Chinese and train the Chinese pilots in jet operations. The MiG-9 was quickly replaced by the MiG-15. Three are known to survive as of 2026.

== Development ==
=== Origins ===
In February 1945, the Council of People's Commissars ordered the Mikoyan-Gurevich (MiG) OKB to develop a single-seat jet fighter to be equipped with two German BMW 003 engines. Intended to destroy bombers, the aircraft was to be equipped with a single 57-millimeter (2.2 in) or 37-millimeter (1.5 in) gun, plus two 23-millimeter (0.9 in) guns. A more detailed directive was issued on 9 April setting out requirements that the aircraft should have a maximum speed of 900 kilometers per hour (559 mph) at sea level and a speed of 910 km/h (565 mph) at an altitude of 5,000 meters (16,400 ft). It should be able to climb to that altitude in four minutes or less and it should have a maximum range of 820 kilometers (510 mi). Three prototypes were ordered to be ready for flight tests by 15 March 1946.

The OKB chose a "pod-and-boom" layout for their new fighter, the I-300 (also called the izdeliye F (model or product F) by the OKB) because it offered the advantages of improved landing performance and better visibility from the cockpit when landing but it had some drawbacks, such as the unfamiliar tricycle arrangement of the landing gear, protecting the rear fuselage from the jet exhaust, and where to place the aircraft's armament. The all-metal aircraft had unswept, mid-mounted wings with two prominent air intakes in the nose. Its two-spar wings were fitted with slotted flaps and Frise ailerons. Its powerplant comprised two RD-20 turbojets, which were Soviet-manufactured versions of the BMW 003. The two engines were located behind the cockpit in the lower fuselage, with the exhaust exiting under the tail unit. A steel laminate heatshield was installed on the bottom of the rear fuselage to protect it from the exhaust gasses. There were four bag-type fuel tanks in the fuselage and three in each wing, providing a total internal fuel capacity of 1,625 liters (429 US gallons). The cockpit was not pressurized. The planned armament consisted of a 57 mm NL-57 cannon mounted in the centerline engine intake bulkhead and two 23 mm Nudelman-Suranov NS-23 autocannon mounted on the lower lip of the air intakes. The N-57/OKB-16-57 gun was provided with 28 rounds and the two NS-23 cannons had 80 rounds each.

Construction of the three prototypes began in late 1945 and the first prototype began manufacturer's testing on 30 December. The ground testing revealed that the engine exhaust caused a low-pressure area under the rear fuselage which caused the fighter to tilt tail-down during engine tests. The rigidly mounted heatshield caused the underside of the rear fuselage to deform because the steel and the duralumin skin of the fuselage had different expansion ratios when heated. The rear fuselage and the heatshield were both redesigned to eliminate these problems. On 23 March the prototype was trucked to the Flight Research Institute (LII)'s airfield at Ramenskoye to begin preparations for flight testing.

According to aviation historian Bill Gunston, on 24 April 1946 representatives from Mikoyan-Gurevich and the Yakovlev OKB tossed a coin to determine which aircraft would be the first Soviet jet to fly. (MiG had brought the I-300, and Yakovlev the Yak-(3)-15.) MiG won and the I-300's first flight lasted six minutes. These early flights revealed problems with the stability of the aircraft and vibration problems with the new articulated heatshield. It was stiffened before the twelfth flight, but that only partially cured the problem. The first aircraft crashed, killing the pilot. During a demonstration in front of high-ranking officials on July 11, the attachment lugs of the wing leading edge fairings failed and they hit the horizontal stabilizers. The remaining two prototypes began flight testing the following month, but preparations for the 7 November parade commemorating the October Revolution delayed the start of the State acceptance trials until 17 December. Meanwhile, the horizontal stabilizer of the second prototype disintegrated during flight, but the pilot was able to land the aircraft safely. Another such incident happened to the third prototype in February 1947 and forced the tail to be reinforced.

The aircraft was given the service designation of MiG-9 (internal OKB designations of I-301 and izdeliye FS) and a small batch of ten aircraft, equipped with original German engines, was ordered during 1946 from Factory No. 1 in Kazan before flight testing was completed. They were intended to be used in the parade, but bad weather forced the cancellation of their flypast. Two of them were assigned to participate in the state acceptance trials while others were used as testbeds for various programs. The trials were concluded in June and the MiG-9 generally met the performance goals set by the Council of People's Commissars. The test pilots found the fighter easy and simple to fly. Defects noted during testing were that the engines flamed out when firing the cannon at high altitudes due to gun gas ingestion, no ejection seat was fitted, nor were air brakes or a fire suppression system. The fuel tanks were not self-sealing and no armor was provided for the pilot. Despite these drawbacks, the MiG-9 was ordered into production at Factory No. 1 before the acceptance tests were completed as the Soviet leadership believed that its shortcomings could be rectified during production. A batch of 50 aircraft, 40 single-seat fighters and 10 two-seat trainers, were ordered in late 1946 to participate in the 1947 May Day parade. In recognition of their accomplishment Artem Mikoyan and Mikhail Gurevich were awarded the Stalin Prize in 1947.

The two-seat trainer had the internal OKB designations of I-301T and izdeliye FT and the first prototype was converted from one of the "parade" aircraft during 1946. Its fuel capacity had to be reduced by one third to make room for the second tandem cockpit. Dual controls were fitted along with an intercom to allow the instructor and student to communicate in the air. Each man had an ejection seat designed after that used by the Germans in their Heinkel He 162 fighter. This aircraft was delivered on 17 January 1947, although flight testing was not completed until 5 April. The ejection seats were not tested in the air, but they required extensive testing on the ground to ensure the proper operation of the seat. State acceptance trials were not completed until 2 June and the aircraft was rejected because of the poor visibility from the rear cockpit. A second aircraft was completed on 15 July and the visibility from the rear cockpit was improved by replacing the original bulletproof windscreen with a larger glass plate, reshaping the canopy's side panels, and removing a partition between the cockpits. This aircraft was fitted with air brakes in the wings and two 260-litre (57 imp gal; 69 US gal) drop tanks hung under its wingtips. It passed its state acceptance trials later in 1947 and was recommended for production with the service designation of UTI MiG-9. The ejection seats were extensively tested during 1948 and approved for use, but by this time the aircraft was deemed obsolete and there was no point in building a training version.

The order for 50 aircraft placed in 1946 was modified to 48 single seaters and one aircraft for the OKB itself, all lacking armament. They were manufactured in March–April 1947 with the standard armament of one 37 mm Nudelman N-37 autocannon, with 40 rounds, and two 23 mm Nudelman-Suranov NS-23 guns, but the production line shut down afterward to incorporate some of the desired changes. These included reinforcement and enlargement of the vertical tail to improve lateral stability; air brakes were added on the wings and the fuel system was improved. The underside of the rear fuselage was recontoured to smooth the air flow of the engine exhaust and air suction inside the fuselage was eliminated. Production restarted and a total of 243 single seaters were completed during the remainder of the year. 250 fighters and 60 trainers were scheduled to be built in 1948, but production was disrupted by preparations to begin manufacture of the vastly superior MiG-15 later that year. Only 302 fighters were delivered that year before production ceased.

The fourth and fifth aircraft of the parade batch were used in flight tests to eliminate the engine flameout problem from late 1947 through early 1948. They were fitted with a prominent rectangular hollow vane on the barrel of the N-37 cannon that was nicknamed the "butterfly" (bahbochka). This allowed all three cannon to be fired simultaneously at altitudes up to 10,100 meters (33,100 ft), but the fin disintegrated after only 813 shots, which could be very dangerous if the debris from the fin was ingested by the engines. An additional problem was that the fin hampered the directional stability of the aircraft and caused it to yaw after 3–5 shots. Another attempt to fix the problem was made in the I-302 (izdeliye FP), a modification of a production aircraft, that moved the N-37 to the port side of the aircraft, but this was apparently not successful either. Other attempts to ameliorate the problem included fitting a muzzle brake on the N-37 as well as extending its barrel, but nothing worked.

=== Alternative engines ===
The I-305 (izdeliye FT) was a MiG-9 airframe with a single Lyulka TR-1 turbojet of 1,500 kgf (15 kN; 3,300 lbf) that replaced the pair of RD-20 turbojets. The armament was rearranged with the 23 mm cannon moved to each side of the fuselage, even with the N-37 gun in the centerline bulkhead; the latter's ammunition supply was increased to 45 rounds. The aircraft was intended to have a pressurized cockpit and its overall weight was reduced to 4,500 kilograms (9,900 lb). The engine, however, was not ready for testing and the aircraft's development was cancelled after the prototype MiG-15 began flight testing in early 1948.

In mid-1946, the Council of Ministers ordered the development of a MiG-9 with afterburning versions of the RD-20, based on the BMW 003S engine. These engines had a maximum power of 1,000–1,050 kgf (9.8–10.3 kN; 2,200–2,300 lbf) and were intended to increase the aircraft's speed to 920 km/h (570 mph) at sea level and 950 km/h (590 mph) at 5,000 meters (16,000 ft). The OKB was directed to build two prototypes, with a 45-millimeter (1.8 in) gun replacing the N-37, that would begin flight tests in April 1947. The OKB added 12-millimeter (0.47 in) armor plates fore and aft to protect the pilot and he was provided with a bulletproof windscreen, but no other changes were made to the aircraft. The I-307 (izdeliye FF) was ready for flight testing a month late and had to use German engines because the Soviet-built versions had not yet been tested. Manufacturer's flight tests were completed on 21 June and the fighter began its state acceptance trials on 2 August, after its engines were replaced, but crashed on 19 August. The second prototype was converted from the fifth aircraft of the parade batch and retained the butterfly used during its earlier gun trials. It was given the same cockpit armor and windscreen as the first prototype, but it used Soviet-built RD-20F (later RD-21) engines. It began its flight trials in December and it demonstrated a top speed of 947 km/h (588 mph) at an altitude of 3,000 meters (9,843 ft) and 928 km/h (577 mph) at 5,200 meters (17,100 ft), but no further development work was done. Some late-production aircraft received this engine.

Another prototype equipped with RD-21 engines and a pressurized cockpit was completed in June 1947. It was known internally as the I-307 (izdeliye FR) and was given the service designation of MiG-9M. The armament was rearranged in another attempt to ameliorate the gun gas ingestion problem with the N-37 being mounted on the starboard side of the fuselage and the two NS-23s on the port side, well aft so that the gun barrels did not protrude beyond the air intake. This caused the cockpit to be moved forward slightly which gave the pilot a better view when landing. The number of fuel tanks was reduced to five, but the aircraft's total capacity remained the same. It made its first flight in July, but the factory flight tests were not completed until early 1948. Despite a top speed of 965 km/h (600 mph) at 5,000 meters (16,000 ft), it failed its state acceptance tests. The reasons given were that the engines continued to flame out if they were run at low rpm at altitudes above 8,000 meters (26,000 ft), the mounts for the cannon were not fully developed and the workmanship of the pressurized cockpit was low. The real reason was that the aircraft was inferior to the MiG-15 already in flight testing.

Another re-engined version of the MiG-9 was the I-320 (izdeliye FN). It had an imported Rolls-Royce Nene I centrifugal-flow turbojet rated at 2,230 kgf (21.9 kN; 4,900 lbf) and the armament was rearranged yet again in another attempt to eliminate the gas ingestion problem. The N-37 cannon was moved to the underside of the fuselage and the NS-23 guns were moved to each side of the fuselage as in the I-305, although none of the gun barrels protruded past the lips of the air intakes. Construction began in late 1947, but it was never completed as the MiG-15 prototype used the same engine and had a higher performance.

One MiG-9 (izdeliye FK) was modified in 1949 to serve as a testbed for the KS-1 Komet air-launched anti-shipping cruise missile. A second unpressurized cockpit was built in line with the trailing edge of the wing for the guidance system operator. The aircraft was fitted with two radars, a K-1M target illumination radar in a prominent bullet-shaped fairing above the air intakes and an aft-looking radar mounted in a cigar-shaped fairing at the top of the vertical stabilizer. This latter system was intended to test the mid-course guidance system of the launching aircraft and the guidance systems of the missile. Signals from the K-1M radar were received in small bullet-shaped fairings on the leading edges of the wings. The aircraft served in this role for four years, until the missile passed its state acceptance trials in 1952–53.

== Operational history ==
The MiG-9 was flown in Soviet service by fighter regiments in the 1st, 7th, 14th, 15th, and 16th Air Armies. These last two were based near Kaliningrad and in East Germany respectively. In addition, the 177th Fighter Aviation Regiment of the 303rd Aviation Division near Yaroslavl flew the aircraft in 1949.

Six divisions of MiG-9s, each with two regiments of 31 aircraft, were transferred to China in November–December 1950 for air defense and training duties. The 17th Guards Fighter Aviation Division (GIAD) defended Shenyang, the 20th Fighter Aviation Division (IAD) guarded Tangshan, and the 65th IAD protected Guangzhou. The 144th IAD defended Shanghai, the 309th guarded Gongzhuling and the 328th IAD protected Peking. These units later handed their aircraft over to the 6th, 7th, 12th, 14th, 16th, and 17th Fighter Divisions of the People's Liberation Army Air Force when their training was complete. The Chinese considered sending their MiG-9s to Korea in 1951 under Soviet pressure, but reconsidered when the PLAAF commanders reported that they believed that it would be better to retrain MiG-9 pilots on MiG-15s.

== Variants ==
I-300 (Samolet F)
prototype, three built
MiG-9 (I-301, Samolet FS)
the only production variant, equipped with RD-20 or RD-21 engines
MiG-9 (I-302, Samolet FP)
one prototype with the N-37 cannon moved to the side of the fuselage
MiG-9 (I-305, Samolet FL)
one prototype with Lyulka TR-1 engine, not completed
MiG-9 (I-307, Samolet FF)
two prototypes with afterburning RD-20F or RD-21 engines
MiG-9 (I-320, Samolet FN)
one prototype with a Rolls-Royce Nene engine, not completed
MiG-9L (Samolet FK)
one aircraft modified to test the avionics for the Raduga KS-1 Komet air-launched anti-shipping cruise missile
MiG-9M (I-308, Samolet FR)
one prototype with RD-21 engines
MiG-9UTI (I-301T, Samolet FT)
two-seat training aircraft, only two built

== Former operators ==
Soviet Union

- Soviet Air Forces

China

- People's Liberation Army Air Force

== Surviving aircraft ==
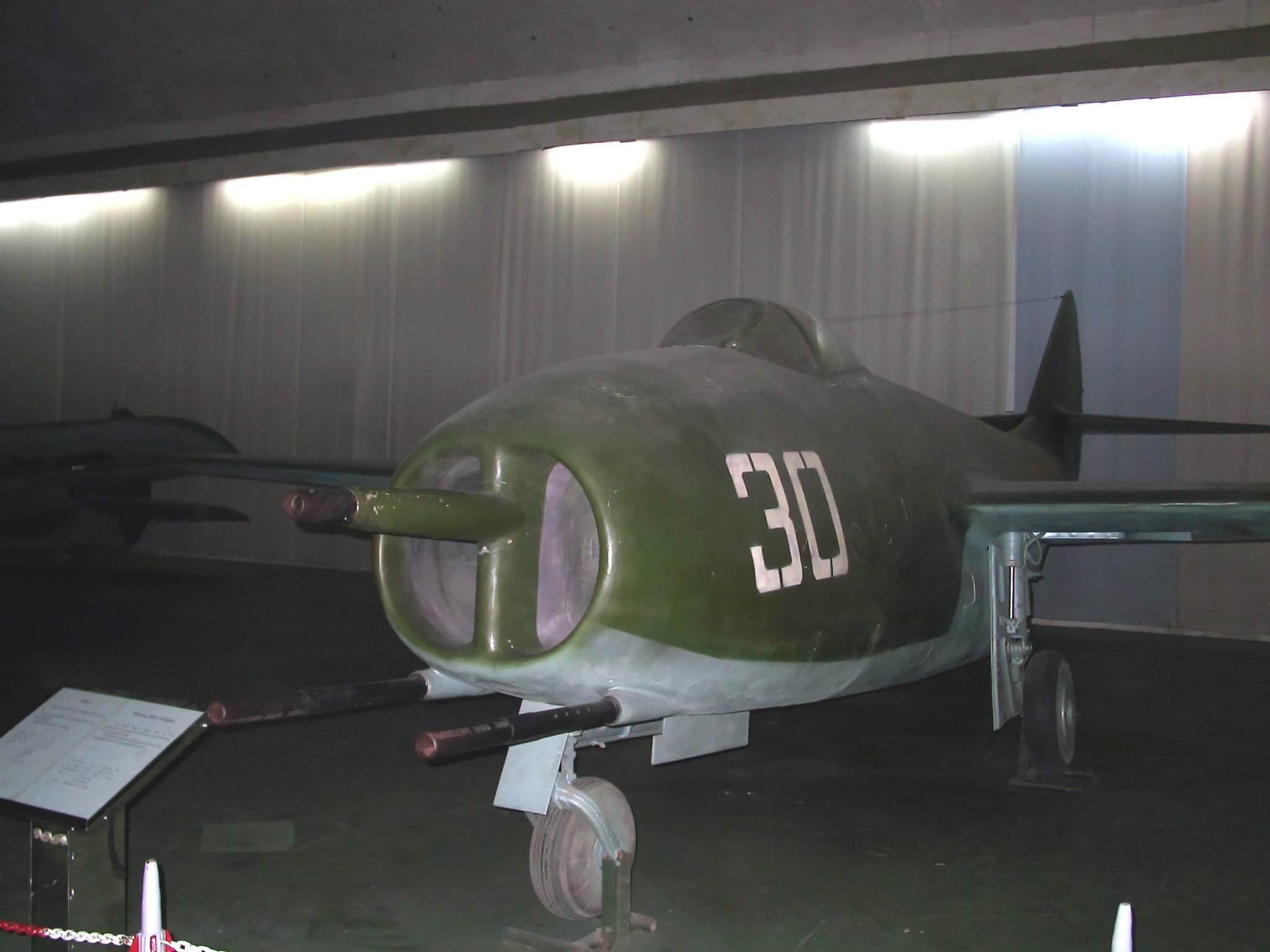
Mikoyan-Gurevich MiG-9 at the Chinese Aviation Museum

- Red 01 (c/n 114010) is at the Central Air Force Museum, Monino, Russia
- White 30 is at the Chinese Aviation Museum, Datangshan, Beijing, China

== Specifications (MiG-9 / FS / I-301) ==
MiG-9 drawing showing top and side

Data from MiG: Fifty Years of Secret Aircraft Design

General characteristics

- Crew: 1
- Length: 9.75 m (32 ft 0 in)
- Wingspan: 10 m (32 ft 10 in)
- Height: 3.225 m (10 ft 7 in)
- Wing area: 18.2 m^{2} (196 sq ft)
- Airfoil: root: TsAGI IA10; tip: TsAGI IV10
- Empty weight: 3,283 kg (7,238 lb)
- Gross weight: 4,860 kg (10,714 lb)
- Fuel capacity: 1,625 L (429 US gal; 357 imp gal)
- Powerplant: 2 × RD-20 axial-flow turbojet engines, 7.80 kN (1,754 lbf) thrust each

Performance

- Maximum speed: 864 km/h (537 mph, 467 kn) at sea level
- Maximum speed: Mach 0.7

910 km/h (570 mph; 490 kn) at 4,500 m (14,764 ft) Mach 0.74

- Never exceed speed: 1,050 km/h (650 mph, 570 kn) / Mach 0.85
- Range: 800 km (500 mi, 430 nmi)
- Service ceiling: 13,000 m (43,000 ft)
- g limits: +6
- Rate of climb: 22 m/s (4,300 ft/min)
- Wing loading: 267 kg/m^{2} (55 lb/sq ft)

Armament

- 1 × 37 mm (1.457 in) Nudelman N-37 autocannon extending from nose intake divider
- 2 × 23 mm (0.906 in) Nudelman-Suranov NS-23 autocannon extending from undersides of nose intake

== See also ==
Aircraft of comparable role, configuration, and era

- Dassault Ouragan – (France)
- de Havilland Vampire – (United Kingdom)
- Lockheed P-80 Shooting Star – (United States)
- Nakajima Kikka – (Empire of Japan)
- Saab 29 Tunnan – (Sweden)
- Sukhoi Su-9 (1946) – (Soviet Union)
- Yakovlev Yak-15 – (Soviet Union)

Related lists

- List of fighter aircraft
- List of military aircraft of the Soviet Union and the CIS

== Bibliography ==
- Belyakov, R. A. & Marmain, J. (1994). MiG: Fifty Years of Secret Aircraft Design. Naval Institute Press. ISBN 1-85310-488-4.
- Gordon, Yefim (2002). Early Soviet Jet Fighters: The 1940s and Early 1950s. Red Star. Vol. 4. Midland Publishing. ISBN 1-85780-139-3.
- Gordon, Yefim & Komissarov, Dmitry (2009). OKB Mikoyan: A History of the Design Bureau and its Aircraft. Midland Publishing. ISBN 978-1-85780-307-5.
- Gunston, Bill (1995). The Osprey Encyclopedia of Russian Aircraft 1875–1995. Osprey. ISBN 1-85532-405-9.
- Gunston, Bill & Gordon, Yefim (1998). MiG Aircraft since 1937. Putnam Aeronautical Books. ISBN 0-85177-884-4.
- Zhang, Xiaoming (2002). Red Wings Over the Yalu: China, the Soviet Union, and the Air War in Korea. Texas A & M University Military History. Vol. 80. Texas A & M University Press. ISBN 1-58544-201-1.
