= Yakovlev Yak-30 (1960) =

Soviet jet trainer aircraft prototype

Yak-30
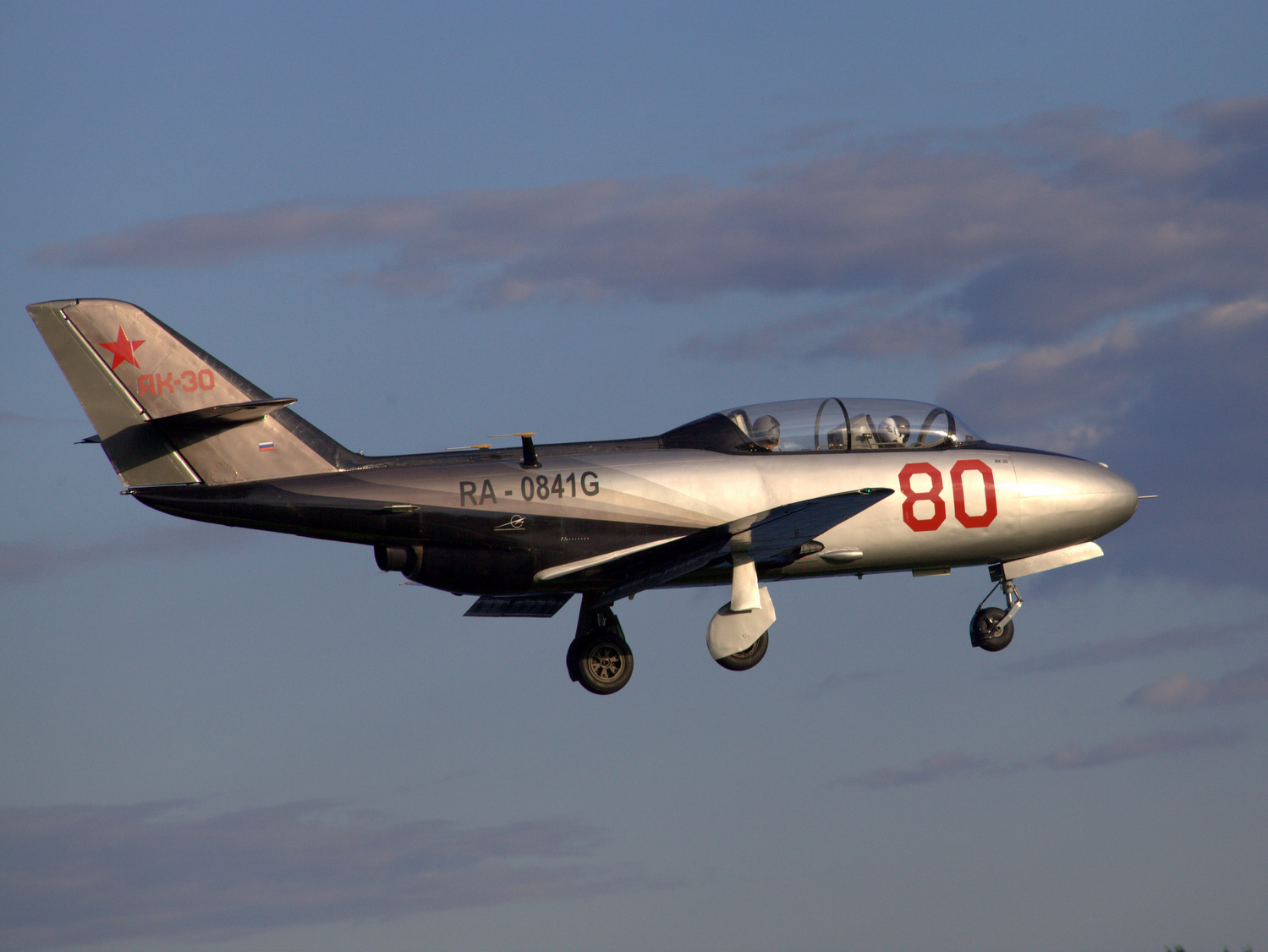

General information
- Type: Trainer
- Manufacturer: Yakovlev
- Primary user: Soviet Air Forces
- Number built: 4

History
- First flight: 20 May 1960
- Variant: Yakovlev Yak-32

The Yakovlev Yak-30 (NATO reporting name Magnum), originally designated Yakovlev 104, was Yakovlev's entry in a competition for the first military jet trainer aircraft designed for Warsaw Pact nations. Designed to succeed the Yak-17UTI, it also led to the development of the Yakovlev Yak-32 sport jet. The Yak-30 lost to the L-29 Delfin, and neither it nor the Yak-32 entered production.

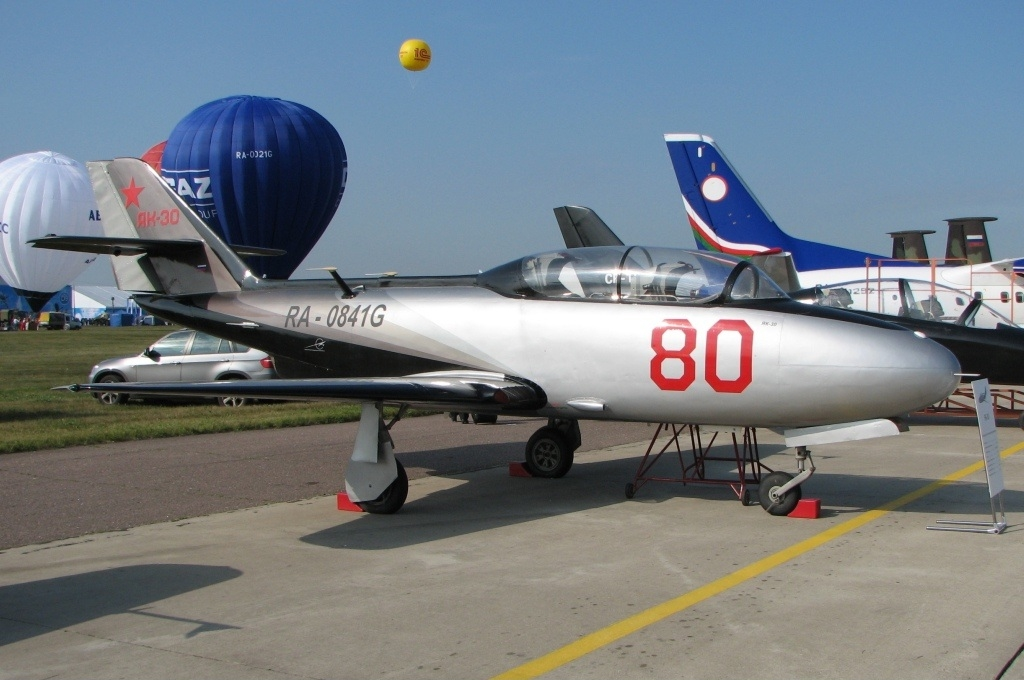
Yakovlev Yak-30 (RA-0841G)

Factory testing took place from 20 May 1960 through March 1961. A total of 82 flights were made with 43 hours 36 minutes of flight time. No difficulties in operating the aircraft were found. The competition ultimately came down to three aircraft, the rivals being the Czechoslovak L-29 Delfin, and the Polish TS-11 Iskra. The Iskra was quickly eliminated and sent back to Poland, leaving the Yak-30 in a head-to-head competition with the L-29, in which the Yak design showed far better performance, including lower weight, better maneuverability and lower production costs. However, in the end, a political decision was reached to select the more robust Czechoslovak L-29 in August 1961 to serve as the primary jet trainer for all Soviet and Warsaw Pact nations except for Poland. Immediately after this decision OKB pilot Smirnov set several official light jet world records in the Yak-30. These included speed over a 25 kilometer course (767.308 km/h), and maximum altitude of 16,128 meters. One of the surviving prototypes is on display at the Central Air Force Museum, at Monino, outside of Moscow.

== Operators ==
Soviet Union

- Soviet Air Force

== Specifications (Yak-30) ==
Data from Wings of Motherland

General characteristics

- Crew: 2
- Length: 10.14 m (33 ft 3 in)
- Wingspan: 9.38 m (30 ft 9 in)
- Height: 3.4 m (11 ft 2 in)
- Wing area: 14.3 m^{2} (154 sq ft)
- Airfoil: TsAGI S-9S
- Empty weight: 1,555 kg (3,428 lb)
- Gross weight: 2,250 kg (4,960 lb)
- Max takeoff weight: 2,550 kg (5,622 lb)
- Fuel capacity: 500 kg (1,100 lb)
- Powerplant: 1 × Tumansky RU-19-300 turbojet engine, 10.51 kN (2,363 lbf) thrust

Performance

- Maximum speed: 660 km/h (410 mph, 360 kn)
- Range: 965 km (600 mi, 521 nmi)
- Endurance: 2 hours 3 minutes
- Service ceiling: 11,500 m (37,700 ft)

(record set at 16,128 m (52,913 ft))

- g limits: +7 -5
- Rate of climb: 18 m/s (3,500 ft/min)
- Wing loading: 154 kg/m^{2} (32 lb/sq ft)
- Thrust/weight: 0.36
- Take off run: 425 m (1,394 ft)
- Landing run: 450 m (1,480 ft)

== See also ==
Related development

- Yakovlev Yak-32

Aircraft of comparable role, configuration, and era

- Aero L-29 Delfín
- Cessna T-37 Tweet
- Lockheed T-33
- PZL TS-11 Iskra
- Saab 105
