= Yakovlev Yak-30 (1948) =

Soviet jet interceptor prototype

Yak-30

General information
- Type: Interceptor
- Manufacturer: Yakovlev
- Status: Project cancelled
- Primary user: Soviet Air Forces

History
- First flight: 4 September 1948
- Developed from: Yakovlev Yak-25

The Yakovlev Yak-30 was an experimental Soviet interceptor from the late 1940s. Derived from the Yak-25, from which it differed primarily in having wings sweptback 35° at quarter chord, the Yak-30 retained the fuselage, tail surfaces and undercarriage of the earlier fighter.

== History ==
The Yak-30 was designed to meet a Soviet requirement for a fighter capable of Mach 0.9, and able to operate from existing unpaved airstrips. To meet this request required a sweptback wing. Yakovlev based their design on the existing Yak-25 experimental fighter, but incorporated a modified wing with a sweep of 35 degrees.

== Development ==
The Yak-30 was to be very similar to the former Yak-25, with only a few changes. The fuselage was that of the Yak-25 but with a circular cross-section. The tail was as on the Yak-25 but with a one-piece rudder, and slightly enlarged horizontal surfaces. The three NR-23 cannon armament was retained, and the cockpit layout was unchanged. The wingtip tanks could not be used, as they moved the aircraft's center of gravity too far back, so they were redesigned to fit flush under the wing, midway from the fuselage. The aircraft was powered by a 1,590 kgf (3,505 lbf) RD-500 turbojet.

== Testing ==
The first of two Yak-30 prototypes was given callsign "42", and the number "5" painted on the rudder. This aircraft was successfully test-flown on 4 September 1948 by pilot Anokhin, who continued test-flying the aircraft until 16 December 1948.

The second prototype, the Yak-30D, which joined the flight test programme early in 1949, had a 38 cm (15 in) section inserted in the aft fuselage, revised mainwheel doors forming a large section of the fuselage skinning, Fowler-type flaps in place of split flaps, increased fuel and ammunition capacity, and changes to the oxygen system and radio equipment. The Yak-30D was also fitted with air brakes on the aft fuselage. Normal loaded weight (without external fuel) was increased by 110 kg (243 lb).

During testing, it reached a speed of Mach 0.935 in a dive. Compared to the Yak-25, top speed was increased by 40 km/h (25 mph) and service ceiling was increased by 1,000 m (3,281 ft). However, the swept wing was found to be unsatisfactory with poor aileron authority.

Although the modifications introduced by the Yak-30D eradicated several shortcomings displayed by the first prototype, the first production deliveries of the superior MiG-15 were already taking place by the time that the improved version of the Yakovlev fighter entered flight test, and the results of NII V-VS trials were, therefore, little more than academic. The Yak-30 designation was later reused for the Yakovlev Yak-30 (1960).

== Specifications (Yak-30) ==

Data from OKB Yakovlev

General characteristics

- Crew: 1
- Length: 8.58 m (28 ft 2 in)
- Wingspan: 8.65 m (28 ft 5 in)
- Wing area: 15.1 m^{2} (163 sq ft)
- Empty weight: 2,415 kg (5,324 lb)
- Gross weight: 3,305 kg (7,286 lb) clean
- Max takeoff weight: 3,630 kg (8,003 lb) with drop tanks
- Powerplant: 1 × Klimov RD-500 centrifugal compressor turbojet engine, 15.9 kN (3,600 lbf) thrust

Performance

- Maximum speed: 1,030 km/h (640 mph, 560 kn) at sea level
- Landing speed: 166 km/h (103 mph; 90 kn)
- Range: 1,000 km (620 mi, 540 nmi) internals
- Ferry range: 1,500 km (930 mi, 810 nmi) with drop tanks
- Service ceiling: 15,000 m (49,000 ft)
- Rate of climb: 41.0 m/s (8,070 ft/min)
- Time to altitude: 5,000 m (16,000 ft) in 2.6 minutes, 5,000 m (16,000 ft) in 6.6 minutes

Armament

- Guns: 3 × 23 mm NR-23 cannon (75 rpg)

== See also ==
Aircraft of comparable role, configuration, and era

- F-84F Thunderstreak

== Bibliography ==
- Gordon, Yefim; Komissariov, Dmitry and Sergey (2005). OKB Yakovlev: A History of the Design Bureau and its Aircraft. Hinckley, England: Midland Publishing. ISBN 1-85780-203-9.
- Gunston, Bill (1995). The Osprey Encyclopedia of Russian Aircraft 1875–1995. London: Osprey. ISBN 1-85532-405-9.
- Gunston, Bill. Yakovlev Aircraft since 1924. London, UK: Putnam Aeronautical Books, 1997. ISBN 1-55750-978-6.
