= Yakovlev Yak-25 (1947) =

Soviet jet interceptor prototype

Yak-25

General information
- Type: Interceptor aircraft
- Manufacturer: Yakovlev OKB
- Status: Project cancelled in 1948; 77 years ago
- Number built: 1

History
- First flight: 2 November 1947; 77 years ago
- Variant: Yakovlev Yak-30

The Yakovlev Yak-25 was a Soviet military aircraft, an early turbojet-powered fighter aircraft designed by the Yakovlev OKB. The designation was later reused for a different interceptor design. Tasked by the Council of Ministers in a directive issued on 11 March 1947, with producing a straight winged fighter similar to the earlier Yak-19, but powered by a Rolls-Royce Derwent V, OKB-115 swiftly produced the Yak-25, which blazed several trails as the first Soviet fighter with a fully pressurised cockpit, air conditioning, jettisonable canopy, and hydraulic airbrakes on the fuselage amongst other innovations.

== Development ==
The Yak-25 closely followed the Yak-19 in layout if not in detail. The straight wings, though similar in planform, were fractionally larger and much thinner (9% t/c throughout), using laminar flow sections. The CAHI flaps were also hydraulically powered. The vertical tail unit differed from the Yak-19 in being swept back at 40° on the leading edge, while the horizontal tail was swept back at 35 degrees.

The Derwent V engine was attached to the rear of the centre fuselage in a manner similar to the Yak-19. Though the fuselage had a different non-circular cross-section from the Yak-19, a similar double bulkhead directly behind the wing allowed the rear fuselage to be completely removed, giving access to the engine for removal or maintenance. The undercarriage was very similar to the Yak-19.

The cockpit was very similar to the earlier Yakovlev jets, though the Yak-25 was pressurized using an air-cycle system based on engine bleed. The single aft-sliding canopy was powered. The bulletproof front windscreen was 57 mm thick, while 8 mm of armor protected the pilot from behind. The ejection seat was an improvement over the Yak-19, with a longer stroke gun, and leg restraints. Armament was also improved, with three NR-23 cannon, each with 75 rounds.

== Testing ==
The Yak-25-I was given the callsign "yellow 15", and had a number "2" painted on the airbrake rudder. It was flown in factory testing by Anokhin between 31 October 1947 and 3 July 1948.

Flight tests followed quickly, and showed that the Yak-25 was easy to fly, and had exceptional performance and maneuverability for a straight-wing aircraft. Unfortunately it soon became clear that the laminar flow section used for the tail unit was totally unsuitable, with extremely severe buffeting setting in at 500 km/h (310 mph). Test pilot L.L. Selyakov reporting that the buffeting was so bad that he was thrown about in the cockpit, banging his head on the canopy, and the needles fell off all the flight instruments. The tailplane section was changed with much improved results. Worse yet, both its rivals, the Lavochkin La-15 and rival swept-wing MiG-15 had superior performance, with the MiG-15 selected for mass production and the La-15 produced in relatively small numbers (235). Yakovlev was never again to build a single-engine fighter superior to the rival aircraft coming from OKB Mikoyan-Gurevich, though neither was OKB Lavochkin. Development was halted, but two of the prototypes were used for test and development purposes.

The Yak-25 never received an ASCC reporting name or USAF type number despite being known to the west at the time.

== Experimental work ==
Further development, replacing the straight wing with one of 35° sweepback, was undertaken as the Yak-30.

=== Yak-25E ===
The Yak-25E (Eksperimentalnyi) was a Yak-25-II specially modified to be towed by a Tupolev Tu-4 strategic bomber. This came in response to a proposal by the headquarters of Long Range Aviation, calling for a method of towing short-range jet fighters, code-named Burlaki (barge hauler).

Production aircraft would have used Klimov RD-500 engines.

At the same time, the U.S. Air Force was experimenting with a similar system, known as Project Tom-Tom. The U.S system would have employed either a specially modified F-84 or an XF-85 Goblin parasite aircraft. Early attempts differed by attaching two fighters to the bomber's wingtips. Later plans called for a parasite aircraft to be stowed internally within the belly of a B-36.

== Specifications (Yak-25 c/n 115001) ==
Data from Early Soviet Jet Fighters, and OKB Yakovlev

General characteristics

- Crew: 1
- Length: 8.66 m (28 ft 5 in)
- Wingspan: 8.88 m (29 ft 2 in)
- Wing area: 14 m^{2} (150 sq ft)
- Aspect ratio: 5.64
- Airfoil: root: TsAGI S-9S-9 (9%); tip: TsAGI KV-4-9 (9%)
- Empty weight: 2,285 kg (5,038 lb)
- Gross weight: 3,185 kg (7,022 lb) clean

3,535 kg (7,793 lb) with tip-tanks

- Fuel capacity: internal fuel+ 2x optional 380 L (100 US gal; 84 imp gal) tanks under the wing-tips
- Powerplant: 1 × Rolls-Royce Derwent V centrifugal-flow turbojet engine, 15.6 kN (3,500 lbf) thrust

Performance

- Maximum speed: 982 km/h (610 mph, 530 kn) at sea level

953 km/h (592 mph; 515 kn) at 3,000 m (9,800 ft)

- Landing speed: 172 km/h (107 mph; 93 kn)
- Combat range: 1,100 km (680 mi, 590 nmi) clean

1,600 km (990 mi) with tip-tanks

- Service ceiling: 14,000 m (46,000 ft)
- Rate of climb: 37 m/s (7,300 ft/min)
- Time to altitude: 5,000 m (16,000 ft) in 2 minutes 30 seconds

10,000 m (33,000 ft) in 6 minutes 18 seconds

- Wing loading: 163 kg/m^{2} (33 lb/sq ft)
- Thrust/weight: 0.45
- Take-off run: 510 m (1,670 ft)
- Landing run: 825 m (2,700 ft)

Armament

- Guns: 3 × 23 mm (0.906 in) Nudelman-Rikhter NR-23 cannon, 75 rpg

== See also ==
- Project Tom-Tom

Aircraft of comparable role, configuration, and era

- Dassault Ouragan
- Lavochkin La-15
- McDonnell XF-85 Goblin
- Republic F-84 Thunderjet

Related lists

- List of military aircraft of the Soviet Union and the CIS

== Bibliography ==
- Gordon, Yefim. "Early Soviet Jet Fighters". Hinkley: Midland. 2002. ISBN 1-85780-139-3
- Gordon, Yefim (2005). OKB Yakovlev: A History of the Design Bureau and its Aircraft. Hinkley: Midland.
- Green, William & Swanborough, Gordon. "The Complete Book of Fighters". London: Salamander Books. 1994. ISBN 1-85833-777-1
- Gunston, Bill. The Osprey Encyclopedia of Russian Aircraft 1875-1995. London: Osprey, 1995. ISBN 1-85532-405-9.
- Gunston, Bill. Yakovlev Aircraft since 1924. London, UK: Putnam Aeronautical Books, 1997. ISBN 1-55750-978-6.
