= Yakovlev Yak-50 (1949) =

Yak-50

General information
- Type: Fighter/interceptor
- Manufacturer: Yakovlev
- Status: Cancelled
- Primary user: Soviet Air Forces

History
- First flight: 15 July 1949

Yakovlev Yak-50 was an early experimental turbojet interceptor aircraft designed in 1948 by the Yakovlev OKB in the USSR. The aircraft was essentially a stretched version of the Yakovlev Yak-30 (1948), with a more powerful engine and greater wing sweep. The Yak-50 is perhaps most significant as the first Yakovlev aircraft equipped with velosipednoye (bicycle) landing gear, a trademark of later Yakovlev designs. The Yak-50 designation was later reused for a propeller-driven aerobatic and trainer aircraft.

== Development and design ==
On February 21, 1949 a Sovmin order requested the Yakovlev OKB to design a lightweight, radar-equipped, all-weather and night interceptor capable of Mach 0.97 at 4,000 m (13,000 ft). The aircraft was to utilize the Klimov VK-1 engine which first appeared on Mikoyan-Gurevich MiG-15 and MiG-17 fighters. This engine was itself a Soviet copy of the British Rolls-Royce Nene centrifugal turbojet initially known as the RD-45. The leading fighter OKBs each created a prototype to meet the requirement, which included the Lavochkin La-200, MiG I-320, Sukhoi Su-15 (unrelated to the later aircraft with the same designation) and the Yak-50 (again, unrelated to the later aircraft). A major difference was that while Yakolev used one engine, the other design bureaus used two.

== Testing ==
The aircraft first flew on 15 July 1949, with test pilot Sergei Anokhin achieving supersonic speed (Mach 1.03 at 10,000 m (33,000 ft)) in a shallow dive during one of the test flights.

Ultimately, none of the newly developed aircraft was selected, and an upgraded MiG-17 was eventually employed. Yakovlev later used the velosipednoye landing gear in the Yak-140 fighter and the Yak-120, and later in the Yak-25 and Yak-28 where it proved highly successful.

The Yak-50 never received an ASCC name or USAF reporting number.

== Operators ==
Soviet Union

- Soviet Air Force

== Specifications ==
Data from

General characteristics

- Crew: 1
- Length: 11.12 m (36 ft 6 in)
- Wingspan: 8.01 m (26 ft 3 in)
- Wing area: 16 m^{2} (170 sq ft)
- Empty weight: 3,085 kg (6,801 lb)
- Gross weight: 4,155 kg (9,160 lb)
- Powerplant: 1 × Klimov VK-1 centrifugal-flow turbojet engine, 26.5 kN (6,000 lbf) thrust

Performance

- Maximum speed: 1,120 km/h (700 mph, 600 kn)
- Range: 850 km (530 mi, 460 nmi)
- Service ceiling: 16,050 m (52,660 ft)
- Rate of climb: 68 m/s (13,400 ft/min)
- Wing loading: 260 kg/m^{2} (53 lb/sq ft)
- Thrust/weight: 0.65

Armament

- Guns: 2× 23 mm Nudelman-Rikhter NR-23 cannons, 80 rounds/gun

== See also ==
Related development

- Yakovlev Yak-30 (1948)
- Yakolev Yak-140

Aircraft of comparable role, configuration, and era

- Mikoyan-Gurevich MiG-17
- F-94 Starfire
- F-86D
- Dassault Mystère II
- Dassault Mystère IV

Related lists

- List of military aircraft of the Soviet Union and the CIS
