= Sensation Lawn Mowers =

American lawnmower manufacturing company

Sensation Lawn Mower Company
- Type: Manufacturing
- Industry: Lawn and garden tractors
- Founded: 1944
- Defunct: 1982
- Fate: Merged
- Successor: Gilson Brothers
- Headquarters: Ralston, Nebraska, USA
- Key people: Howard Phelps
- Products: Lawnmowers

Sensation Lawn Mowers was a commercial lawnmower brand created by Howard Phelps in 1944. The Sensation Lawn Mower Company was located in Ralston, Nebraska, USA.

== History ==
In 1941 Howard Phelps received patent number 2,265,545 on his mowing machine, which featured a rotary cutting blade directly driven by an industrial quality electric motor. This very prototype still exists and is on display at the Pioneer Village Museum in Minden, NE. The Sensation Lawn Mower Company was started by Howard and his wife Rosemary Rodman Phelps.

In 1944 Phelps designed a gasoline powered mower.

During the 1950s a generation of snow blowers were developed under the name of Snow Blow. Phelps held patents on over 20 innovations in the lawn industry including the first for a rotary mower grass catcher U.S. patent number 2,855,744 in 1960.

In 1966 Phelps sold the company to local real estate agent Frank Rogers who in turn sold it to a group of Chicago investors headed by Carl Johnson. The plant was moved to 16th and Evans Streets in North Omaha, Nebraska. The "Sensation Mike Bike" was named after Frank Rogers son Mike.

In November 1982 the Sensation Lawn Mower Company was bought by Gilson Brothers, which is considered one of the founding industries of Wisconsin by researchers at the University of Wisconsin. Gilson Brothers' products were distinctive due to a bright orange and white color scheme.

In 1988 Gilson was bought out by Lawnboy, which was acquired in 1989 by Toro.

Sensation brand lawn mowers are no longer produced but are still in use today. Mowers were available with the Sensation brand into the 1980s. The Sensation brand was preferred by a number of landscapers because to their perceived high-quality and apparent longevity. The mower was considered unique because of features such as greaseable wheels, thick cast aluminum decks, and some unique innovations like a cone-shaped metal crankshaft support which was purported to help prevent bending of the crankshaft.

=== Brand timeline ===
- 1942 - Sensation Mower Inc. founded by Howard Phelps.
- 1966 - Phelps sells the company to local real estate agent Frank Rogers.
- 1967 - Rogers sells the company to a group of Chicago investors headed by Carl Johnson.
- 1982 - Sensation Lawn Mower Company was bought by Gilson Brothers.
- 1980s - Sensation Lawn Mowers cease to be sold.
