= Lawn Boy (disambiguation) =

Lawn Boy may refer to:

- Lawn-Boy, a lawn mower previously manufactured by Evinrude Outboard Motors; currently manufactured by The Toro Company
- Lawnboy, a 1999 book by Paul Lisicky
- Lawn Boy, an album by American band Phish
- Lawn Boy (Evison novel), a book by Jonathan Evison
- Lawn Boy, a book by Gary Paulsen
