= Gilson Brothers Co. =

American company

Gilson Brothers Company
- Industry: Consumer durables
- Founded: 1911
- Headquarters: Plymouth, Wisconsin, United States
- Key people: John P. Gilson and Michael Gilson
- Products: Outdoor power equipment and recreational equipment

Gilson Brothers Co. was a Wisconsin-based manufacturer of outdoor power equipment and recreational equipment. It operated independently between its inception in 1911 until acquisition by Lawn-Boy in 1988. The company was probably most well known for its garden tillers, snowblowers and garden tractors produced from the 1960s through the 1980s.

== History ==
John P. Gilson and his brother Michael Gilson were descendants of Theodore Gilson, who had emigrated to the United States from Colmar-Berg, Luxembourg and, in 1850, started what eventually became the Gilson Manufacturing Company. Brothers John and Michael, having both worked for that company, started the Gilson Brothers Company in 1911. At that time, the Gilson Brothers' main products were limestone grinders, feed cutters, and concrete mixers.

In 1988, Gilson Brothers Co. was acquired by Lawn-Boy, which was itself acquired by the Toro company in the following year. It was at this point that production of Gilson-branded lawn and snow equipment ceased.

The Gilson line of concrete mixers was sold to the Cleform company of Missouri, which was acquired in 2010 by the Marshalltown Company of Marshalltown, Iowa. As of January 2011, that company still sells concrete mixers under the Gilson name.

== Products ==
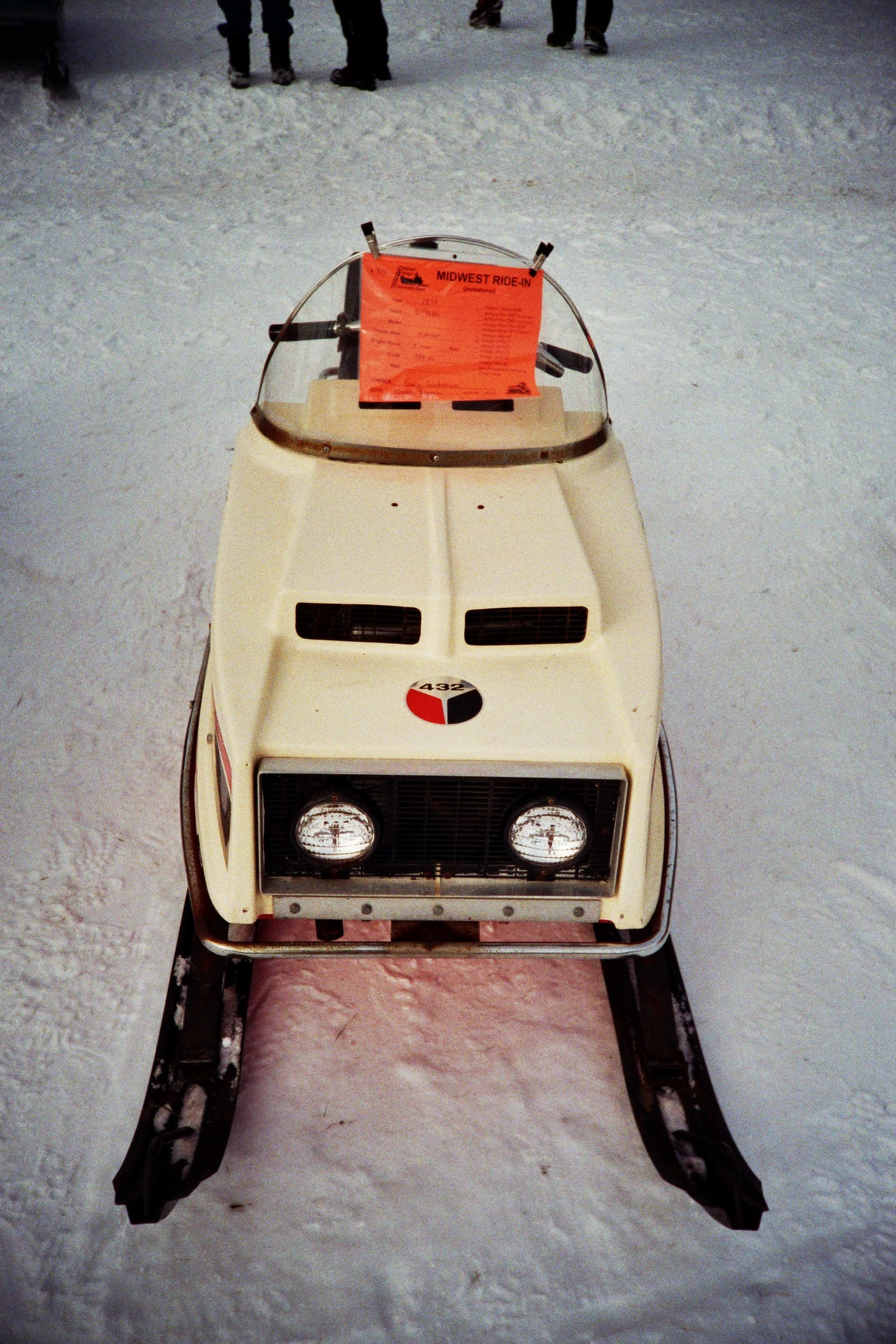
A 1971 Gilson 432 snowmobile

Gilson Brothers Co. has produced a wide range of products, including:

- Crushers
- Rotary tillers
- Feed cutters
- Concrete mixers
- Minibikes
- Snowmobiles
- Barbecue grills
- Snowblowers and snowthrowers
- Lawn and garden tractors
- Tillers

Those Gilson Brothers products that were sold under the Gilson brand were typically painted with the company's signature beige-and-crimson color scheme, starting in 1977 they used crimson-and-black. Gilson Brothers products were also re-branded and sold under the names Montgomery Ward, Lawn-Boy, Ford, Snow Charger, Wizard, Plymouth, Marshall Wells, and others.

Most Gilson snowblowers were powered by Briggs & Stratton engines.

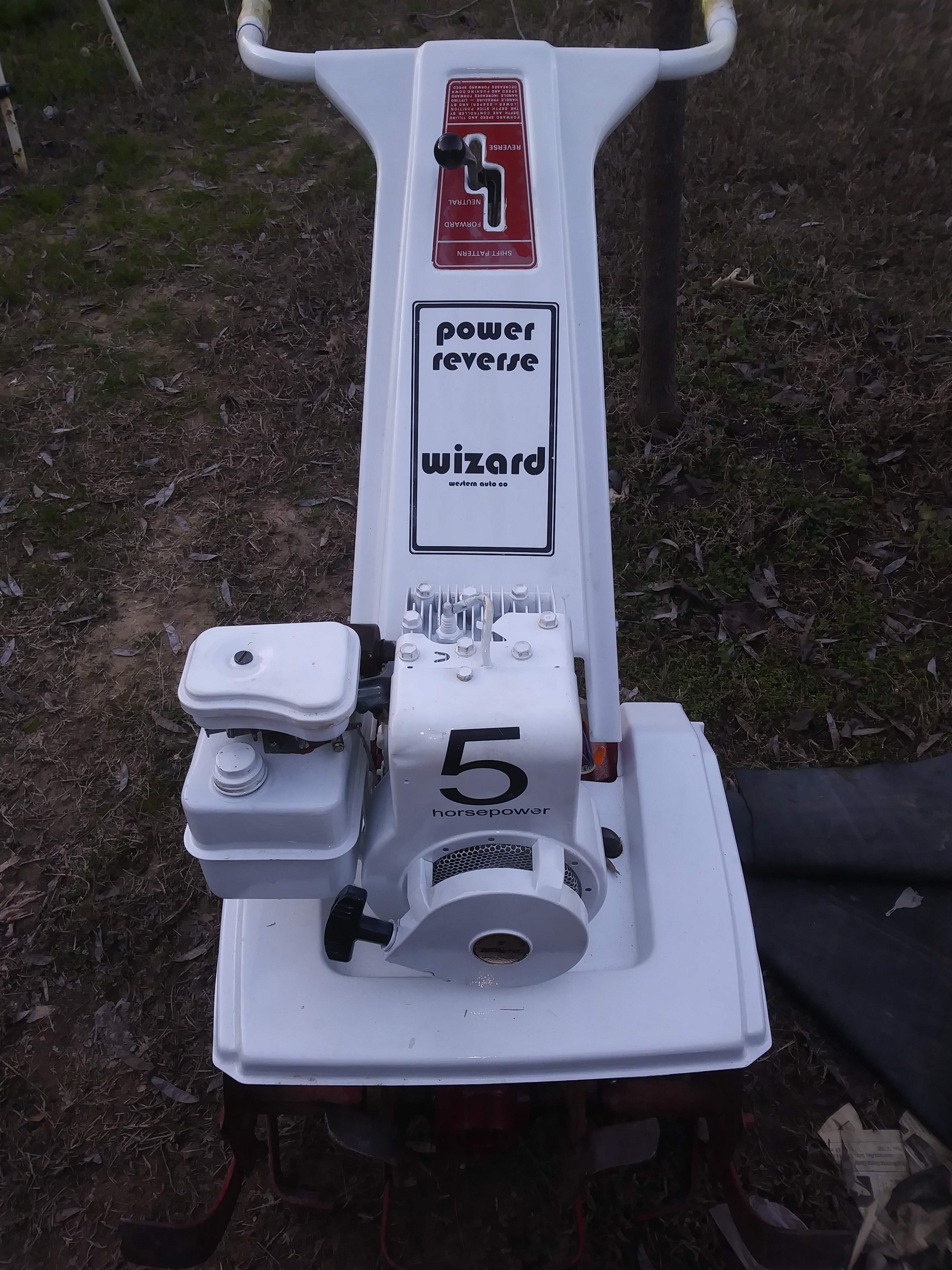
Tiller sold under Western Auto

=== UniTrol ===
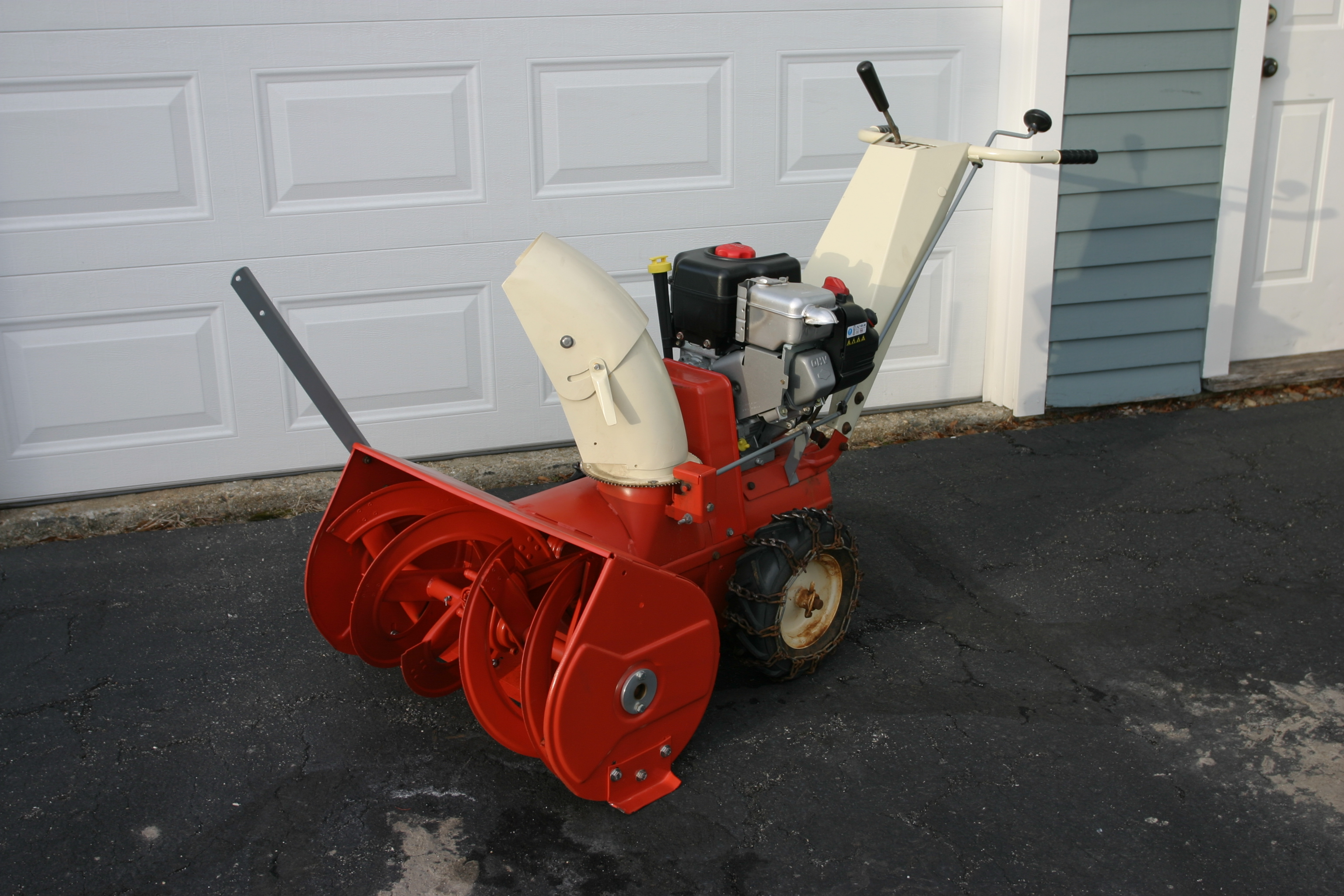
Unitrol snowblower model 55093, circa 1975

UniTrol (or Uni-Trol) was a patented Gilson Brothers innovation in snowblower drive linkage that allows operation of the clutch and gearchange with a single lever. It was introduced in 1969 and was available on Gilson snowblowers until 1979.

When a UniTrol snowblower is running, the engine is always turning a drive platter. The act of engaging a gear presses a rubber-edged wheel against the flat steel surface of the spinning platter, which transfers power through 90 degrees to the drive axle and at a ratio inversely proportional to the distance from the center of the platter at which the wheel is engaged. A neutral "gear" is available by simply lifting the wheel from the surface of the platter, and a reverse gear is available by engaging the wheel at a symmetric point across the center of the platter.

The style of baffle used in the single-speed UniTrol snowblowers was also patented for its unique design.

=== Snow Cannon ===
The "Snow Cannon" was the Gilson line of compact snow throwers, for which a patent was granted in 1980. These machines were powered by two-stroke engines (manufactured either by Briggs & Stratton, Tecumseh or OMC (Outboard Marine Corp). The throwing mechanism on the Snow Cannon machines was advertised with the marketing term "TURBO-THRUST".
