= WhiteBoard Product Solutions =

- Formerly: Leisure Design
- Industry: Product development consultancy
- Founded: 1986
- Founder: Rick Polk
- Headquarters: Eden Prairie, Minnesota
- Website: whiteboardps.com

WhiteBoard Product Solutions is a United States product development consultancy (previously known as Leisure Design) based in Eden Prairie, Minnesota that helps clients develop and launch new products. WhiteBoard product development services include industrial design, engineering, prototyping, packaging, and graphic design.

== History ==
WhiteBoard was founded by Rick Polk in 1986 as Leisure Design. The original name was derived from the assets that Polk purchased from the toy company Leisure Dynamics, where Polk was Vice President of R&D, when it was sold to Coleco Industries, the maker of the Cabbage Patch Kids dolls. In 1991, Leisure was commissioned by George Plimpton to design a gag gift for President George H. W. Bush. President Bush was so pleased with the gift that he called owner Rick Polk to thank him and commission Leisure to create a gag gift for First Lady Barbara Bush. In 2007, the business was renamed WhiteBoard Product Solutions to reflect that clients were increasingly bringing it into the front end of projects so that it could bring a holistic approach to designing solutions. The company often plays a silent partner, helping clients develop and refine new products so that they are commercially viable.

WhiteBoard won its first design award in 1991 for the FM 320 Ski Exerciser, making it the first fitness product to win the best consumer product award. In 1993 and 1997 WhiteBoard was awarded International Design Excellence Awards, juried by the Industrial Designers Society of America and previously co-sponsored by Business Week Magazine.

== Clients ==
WhiteBoard has helped many large and small companies develop and launch new products, including Toro, Mattel, Fisher-Price, Aveda, Nike, Ecolab, Medtronic, Arctic Cat, Wagner, Hasbro, and Spalding.
