= Gale Products =

Manufacturing company in Galesburg, Illinois

Gale Products was a manufacturer of several products based in Galesburg, Illinois. The company started in 1937 assembling refrigerators from parts sent in from Waukegan, Illinois The factory expanded making many other household products. In 1941, Gale Products was acquired by the Outboard Marine Corporation (OMC) to build outboard motors. After building over one million motors, the parent company OMC ceased boat motor manufacturing reusing the facility as the new headquarters and factory of Lawn-Boy lawn mowers. Eventually, Lawn-Boy was sold to its competitor Toro where offices were moved to Minnesota and manufacturing was moved to other Toro facilities. The factory was closed in the mid-1980's.
