= Yakovlev Yak-50 =

Yakovlev Yak-50 may refer to:

- Yakovlev Yak-50 (1949), a Soviet experimental turbojet interceptor aircraft
- Yakovlev Yak-50 (1975), a Soviet propeller-driven aerobatic and trainer aircraft
