= Cecil Elwood Pond =

American inventor & businessman (1924-2011)

Cecil Elwood Pond (June 4, 1924 – December 30, 2011) was an American businessman, inventor, and entrepreneur. He was the founder of Wheel Horse Products Co. Inc and was the primary inventor of the modern American riding mower.

== Early life and family ==
Pond was born in South Bend, Indiana, to Elmer and Ann Marie Pond. He graduated from South Bend's former Washington-Clay High School, and served in the U.S. Army during World War II. In 1946, Pond returned to South Bend and in June of that year, married Betty Alber Pond. The Ponds had a son, Gary, and two daughters, Linda and Constance.

== Beginnings in business ==
In 1946, Pond joined his father, who at the time was building two-wheel lawn tractors (which the operator would walk behind) from angle iron, surplus motorcycle and automotive parts in his garage. At first, the Ponds' company was simply called Pond Tractor Company, but when they discovered another family member owned a similarly-named company, "Wheel Horse" was chosen, and the name stayed with the company until its demise as a separate operation of the Toro companies in the 1980s.

In the late 1940s, veterans returning from World War II began moving to the vast new suburbs then transforming the American landscape. Their homes had larger lots that demanded more attention and the Ponds' riding mower found many ready buyers as a result.

In 1954, Pond introduced his first 4-wheel lawn tractor, an event which altered substantially the lawn care manufacturing business. By 1957, his Wheel Horse Products company recorded sales over $1 million (US$11,463,270 in 2025 dollars) for the first time. Two years later, the company's sales more than doubled, to $4.5 million (US$49,700,342 in 2025 dollars).

=== Sale to American Motors Corporation ===
In 1975, Pond sold Wheel Horse Products to American Motors Corporation. At the time, Pond had over 500 workers at his plant and over 3,000 dealers were selling the brand.

== Branching out into other businesses ==
In the 1970s, Pond acquired Skystream Airlines, a small commuter airline in northern Indiana. Skystream, which was formed in September 1973, when it acquired routes once flown by Hub Airlines, Inc., served northern Indiana, Illinois and Michigan.

Also in the 1970s, Pond purchased Lakeside Winery, formerly Molly Pitcher Vineyards, located in Harbert, Michigan. The vineyard/winery was the oldest in Michigan.

Pond served for a time as president of the Young Presidents Organization.

== Bibliography ==
In 2000, Pond was the subject of the biography Straight From the Horse's Mouth, by Michael Martino.
