= Wheel Horse =

1946–1986 American manufacturer of outdoor power equipment

Wheel Horse Company
- Industry: Power equipment
- Founded: 1946
- Defunct: 1986
- Fate: Acquired
- Successor: The Toro Company
- Headquarters: South Bend, Indiana, USA
- Key people: Cecil Pond
- Products: lawn and garden tractors
- Parent: The Toro Company (TTC)

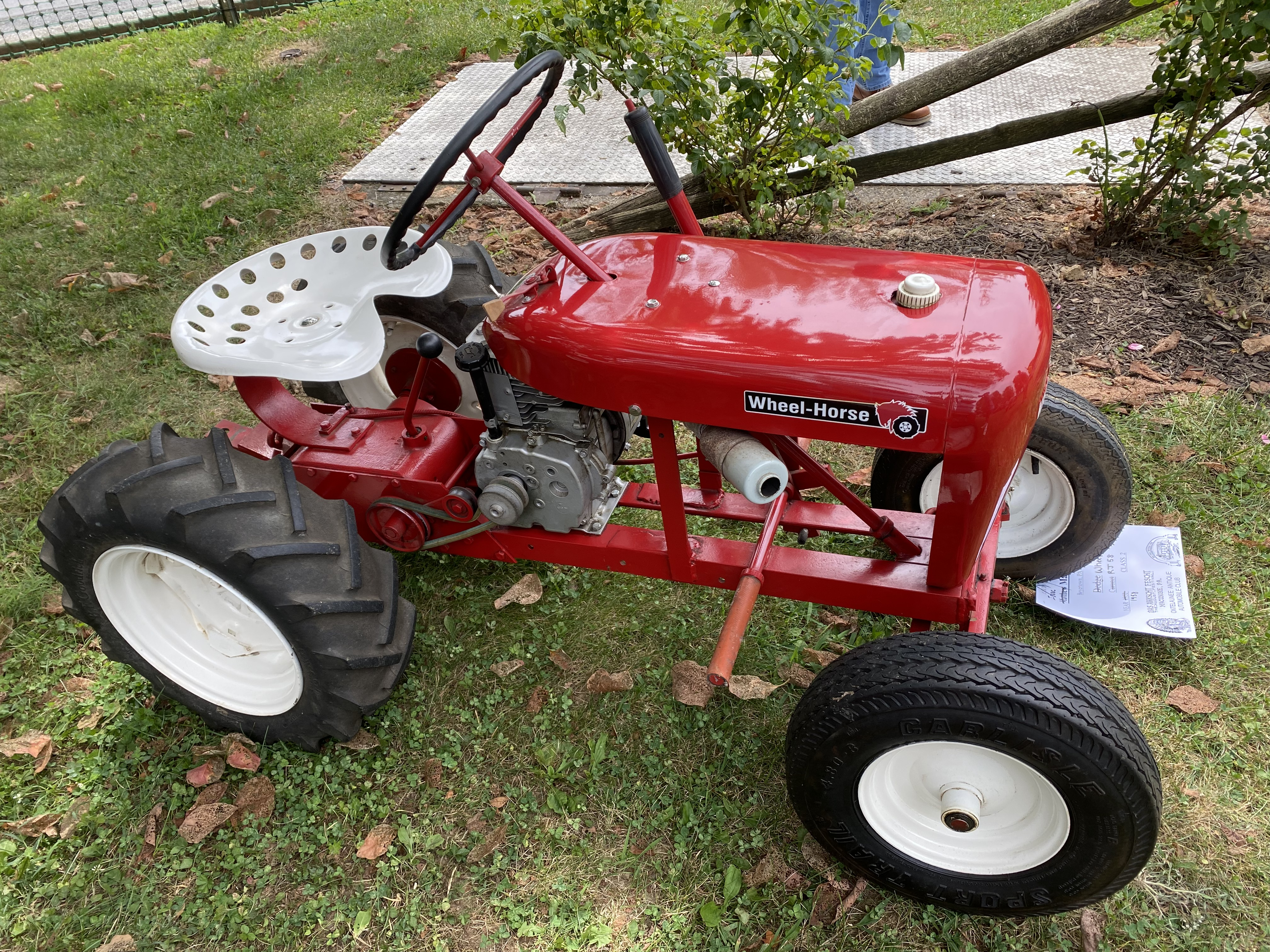
1958 Wheel Horse Rj-58 garden tractor

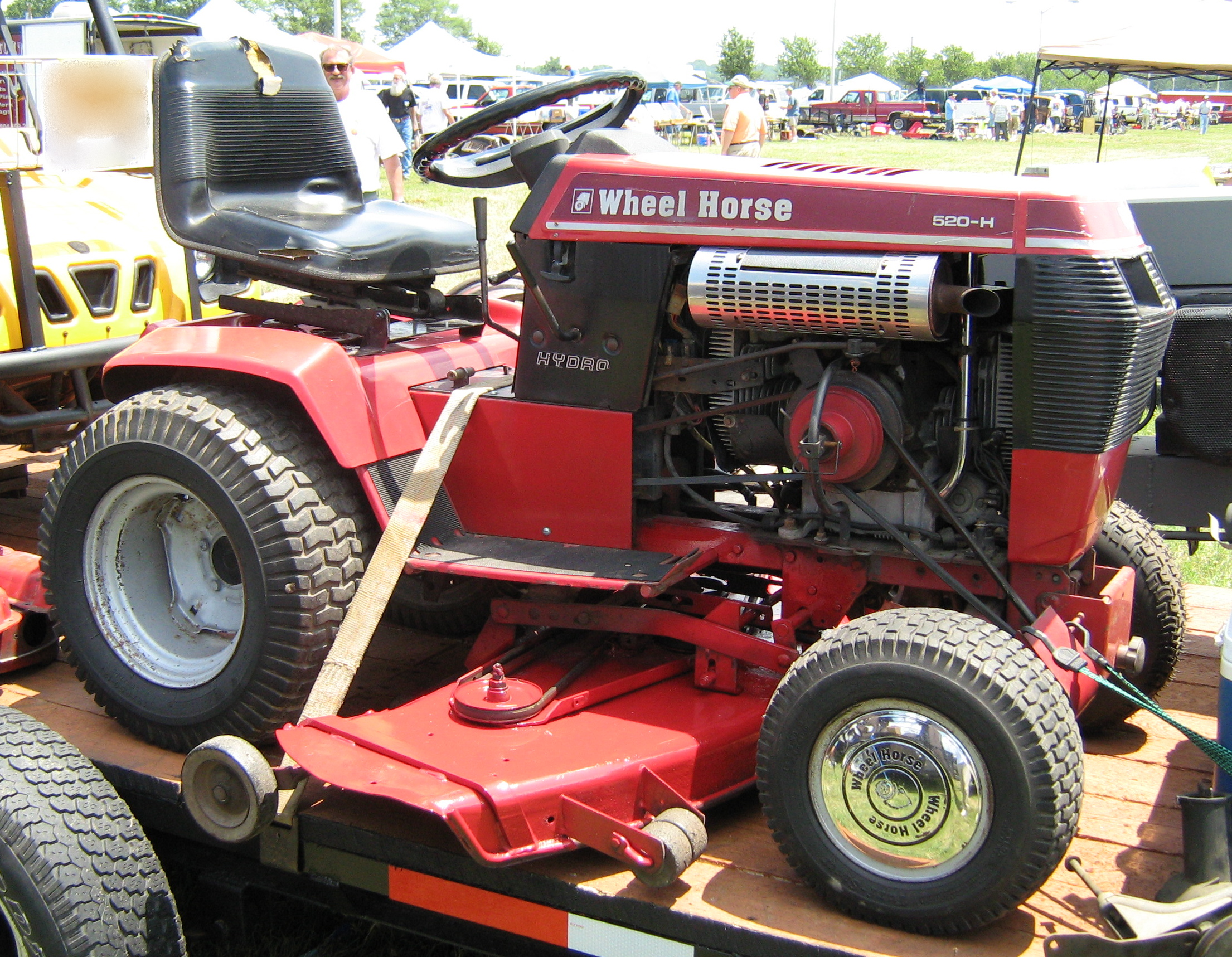
1988 Wheel Horse 520-H garden tractor

Wheel Horse was an American manufacturer of outdoor and garden power equipment, including lawn and garden tractors. The company's headquarters were in South Bend, Indiana.

== History ==
The business was started in the two-car garage of Elmer Pond in 1946. Pond began building two-wheel, self-propelled "Walk-Away" garden tractors that were sold under the Pond name. Due to a naming conflict with another company, the company's name was changed to Wheel Horse. The name not only evokes tractors generally (doing tractive work with wheels) but also the connotation of a steady, dependable worker (wheelhorse). Pond's son Cecil Elwood Pond continued to develop and market the company's products. The framework was typically simple angle or channel iron and various surplus motorcycle and automotive parts were used. In 1947, a four-wheel tractor, the "Ride-Away" model was introduced for garden use. It was also made from crude parts and without a hood for easy service access.

The demand for garden tractors was rapidly increasing as households with small gardens found them rather inexpensive, practical to use for a variety of chores, and they were economical to maintain. By 1956, the business had become very successful. The company began to build a range of small to large lawn and garden tractors, in addition to a line of riding lawn mowers. A characteristic of the products was their standardization through the years. The most popular model and year was the R-J58 Wheel Horse 1958, it came without a mowing deck, but one could be added.

A new model was produced in 1958, which included a three-speed transmission. This transmission is called the Uni-Drive transmission that Elmer Pond designed in 60 days. One tractor model was named Rj-58 and included a Clinton B-1290 or a Kohler k-90 engine. The Rj-35 used a Clinton B-1200 engine with a belt driven transmission. When equipped with a Briggs & Stratton 2.5 horsepower (1.9 kW) engine, the model of the tractor became RJ-25.

The attachments remained the same for the RJ series. From 1956 to 1957, Wheel Horse changed the color of the wheels from black into an almond color.

The demand for these little tractors grew so much by the end of 1959 that they could not keep up with production. Sales were over US$4.5 million.

In 1960, there were significant style changes. However, the engine location immediately in front of the operator and the 12-inch (305 mm) wheels stayed the same. Two models of tractors were introduced this year: the model 400, with a 4 hp (3.0 kW) Kohler engine and the model 550, with a 5.5 hp (4.1 kW) Tecumseh-Lauson engine. These two models were known as the "Suburban" tractors.

In 1965, Wheel Horse was among the first to introduce tractors with a hydrostatic drive system, the model 875 and 1075 "Wheel-a-Matics".

To expand snow removal options beyond the dozer blade attachment for its tractors, the company also added snow blowers to its power products with the "Reo" snow thrower line.

The company's products earned a good reputation in the marketplace. The 1968 Ranger was a high-end 6 hp (4.5 kW) rider with big rear wheels, "husky front suspension", and featured a two-year warranty.

In April 1968, Wheel Horse entered the snowmobile market by purchasing the Sno-Flite snowmobile line of CE Erickson of Des Moines, Iowa. Six-models called "Safari" ranged from 295 to 440 cc producing 18 hp (13.4 kW) to 30 hp (22.4 kW) with an optional electric start system, and were priced from $845 to $1,195. Sno-Flite snowmobiles were made by Wheel Horse until 1972, when the line was sold to Parts Unlimited, who continued support for the products until replacement parts ran out in the late-1970s or early-1980s.

In the spring of 1969, Wheel Horse opened a production plant in Oevel, Belgium. The factory was called Amnor N.V. Production ended on this site in 1991. The building is now the headquarters for Toro Europe.

There were eleven models in four lines of lawn and garden tractors by 1974: the 8 hp (6.0 kW) "economy" A Series with standard 32-inch mower and electric or recoil start, the "compact" B Series with a four-speed or automatic transmission, the C Series offering four models (the C-120 and C-160 automatic, and the C-100 and C-160 8-speed and the c161), as well as the top-of-the-line D Series featuring automatics in D-160, D-180, and the D-200 powered by a twin-cylinder, 19.9 hp (14.8 kW) engine.

The business was acquired by American Motors (AMC) on May 24, 1974. The company paid $30 million as it expanded into non-automotive markets.

In 1982, a group of AMC officers, led by director of corporate development John S. Munn acquired Wheel Horse in a management buyout. During this time, some cosmetic changes were made, but frame and attachment design remained the same. In mid-August 1986, Wheel Horse was purchased for $8 million by Toro. Tractors were built under the Toro banner for the next two decades. Under their new owner, economically priced Wheel Horse tractors shared the same pressed-steel frames, attachments, and other parts used in bargain-built Toro family equipment. In fact, even larger garden and compact tractors were "cookie cutter" units identical in construction to New Holland models built under contract by Toro. The Wheel Horse name was eliminated from production after 2007.

== Collectability ==
The brand has enjoyed a resurgence of interest in recent years, such that in 1999 the "Wheel Horse Collectors Club" was formed and has gathered annually in June at the South Mountain Fairgrounds in Arendtsville, Pennsylvania. Owners exhibit their machines and participate in "Horse" trading.

== Bibliography ==
- Martino, Michael A. (2000). Straight from the Horse's Mouth: The Wheel Horse Story. Stemgas Publishing. ISBN 978-0-9706668-0-2.
