= Lavochkin La-200 =

Prototype Soviet all-weather interceptor

La-200
- Lavochkin Aircraft 200 with Toriy radar

General information
- Type: All-weather interceptor; Night fighter
- National origin: Soviet Union
- Manufacturer: Lavochkin
- Designer: Semyon Lavochkin
- Number built: 1

History
- First flight: 9 September 1949

The Lavochkin La-200 (a.k.a. Aircraft 200) was a two-seater, swept winged, night/all-weather jet prototype designed as an interceptor and manufactured by the Soviet Union's Lavochkin Design Bureau from 1948.

== Design and development ==
In response to a requirement for a high performance night and all-weather interceptor, Lavochkin (OKB-310), Sukhoi (OKB-134) and Mikoyan-Gurevich (OKB-155) design bureau developed the La-200, Su-15, and I-320 (where the I stands for Istrebitel, or "Fighter") respectively. A key component of the three competing aircraft, was the "Toriy" ("Thorium") centimetre waveband NII-17 radar at Tikhomirnov NIIP - (NIIP for Nauchno-Issledovatel'skiy Institut Priborostroyeniya, or "Research Institute of Instrument Engineering"), which was capable of detecting a Boeing B-29 Superfortress bomber at a range of 20 km (12 mi).

The La-200 was an all-metal, two seater, twin-engined jet aircraft, with a tricycle undercarriage and mid set wings with 40° sweep at 1/4 chord. The two Klimov RD-45F centrifugal flow turbojet engines were to be fitted in tandem inside the front and rear fuselage with the air intake at the extreme nose. The forward engine exhausted under the centre fuselage and the rear engine exhausted at the end of the rear fuselage. Access to the engines for maintenance and removal was gained by removing the forward fuselage forward of the nose undercarriage and the rear fuselage forward of the fin.

The main and nose undercarriages were housed entirely within the fuselage. The nose undercarriage rotated 90° to lie flat under the forward engine, and the twin wheeled main undercarriage legs, with long travel levered suspension, retracted into the centre fuselage above the forward jet pipe and astride the fuel tank and intake trunking for the rear engine.

The swept wings were of constant chord with 2/3 span flaps, 1/3 span ailerons, and wing fences at approximately 1/4 and 1/2 span. The tail unit comprised a sharply swept broad chord tapered fin with a sharply swept tapered tailplane at 2/3 fin length. The swept wings maximised the speed performance but imposed a higher wing loading than specified by the Soviet Air Force, thus the RD-45F engines were replaced with Klimov VK-1 engines, (up-rated RD-45F's).

The "Toriy" radar was initially fitted in an ogival radome in the centre of the air intake.

== Operational history ==
The La-200 incorporated many innovative systems, including powered flying controls, high capacity hydraulic and pneumatic systems, high voltage AC electrical power system and a comprehensive avionics suite. OKB-301 carried out extensive ground tests, allowing problems revealed in the tests to be addressed before the first flight.

For initial tests the aircraft was fitted with dual controls in the side by side cockpit. Flight trials were relatively successful, but revealed a tendency to drop the starboard wing at high speeds (known colloquially as val'ozhka). Other problems included vibrations of the rear fuselage with the rear engine throttled back and the front engine at maximum power, the twin mainwheels proved troublesome as well as unreliable radio and very poor performance from the radar.

To help cure the problems the starboard wing incidence was increased by 1° 30', and the twin mainwheels were replaced by single wheel units. Spill doors were fitted to the rear fuselage, arranged to open automatically when the rear engine was throttled back. The flaps and wings were stiffened, and separate aileron hydraulic actuators were installed in the wings rather than a single actuator behind the cockpit seats. Cooling air was provided for the radio which was located close to the front engine jetpipe. To address the failings of the radar, it was decided to replace it with the Korshun -(Kite) radar also developed by NII-17. The single antenna was moved to the top lip of a redesigned air intake.

By the spring of 1951 Aircraft 200 was the only one of the three competitors to survive and pass State acceptance trials. Production was provisionally ordered as the La-17, but the production directive was not endorsed so production was abandoned.

While other OKB's were designing the next generation of all-weather interceptors, OKB-301 was tasked with fitting the new Sokol (Falcon) radar into the La-200. The result was Aircraft 200B, with a new fuselage nose housing the radar behind a large radome with three air intakes surrounding the radome. By mid 1953 the radar was working adequately but Aircraft 200B's performance was no longer good enough and further work was abandoned.

== Variants ==
- - 200 with Toriy (Thorium) radar
- - 200 with Korshun (Kite) radar
- - La-17 the proposed production version of the 200 with Korshun radar was not produced but designation re-used later for a target drone.
- - 200B with Sokol (Falcon) radar

== Specifications (La-200B) ==
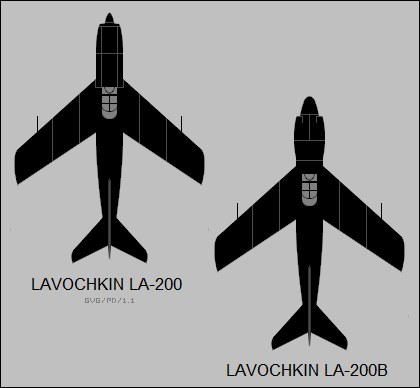
La-200 (left) and La-200B plan silhouettes

Data from Yefim Gordon. Lavochkin's Last Jets. Midland Publishing. Hinkley. 2007. ISBN 1-85780-253-5

General characteristics

- Crew: Two
- Length: 16.351 m (53 ft 7.75 in)
- Wingspan: 12.96 m (42 ft 6.24 in)
- Wing area: 40.02 m^{2} (430.32 sq ft)
- Empty weight: 8,810 kg (19,420 lb)
- Gross weight: 12,630 kg (27,840 lb)
- Powerplant: 2 × Klimov VK-1 , 26.487 kN (5,950 lbf) thrust each

Performance

- Maximum speed: 1,070 km/h (664 mph, 577 kn)
- Maximum speed: Mach 0.95
- Range: 1,170 km (726 mi, 631 nmi) internal tanks only; 2,170 km, (1,347 mi, 1,170 nmi) with drop tanks
- Service ceiling: 15,550 m (51,017 ft)
- Rate of climb: 27.78 m/s (5,470 ft/min)

Armament

- 3 x 37mm Nudelman N-37D cannon

== See also ==
Aircraft of comparable role, configuration, and era

- Douglas F3D Skyknight
- Mikoyan-Gurevich I-320
- Northrop F-89 Scorpion
- Sukhoi Su-15 (1949)
- Yakovlev Yak-25

Related lists

- List of aircraft
- List of military aircraft of the Soviet Union and the CIS
