= Vladimir Yakovlevich Klimov =

Soviet engineer (1892–1962)

- Владимир Яковлевич Климов
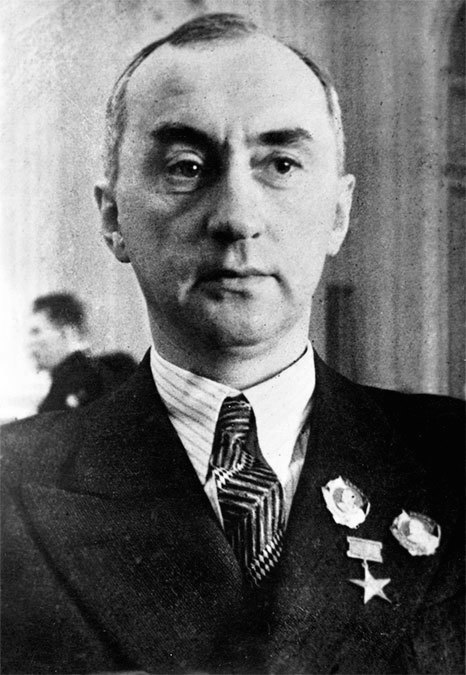
- Born: 23 July 1892; Moscow, Russian Empire
- Died: 9 September 1962 (aged 70); Moscow, Russian SFSR, Soviet Union
- Resting place: Novodevichy Cemetery, Moscow
- Citizenship: Russian Empire; Soviet Union
- Education: Moscow Higher Technical School (1918)
- Occupation: Aircraft engine designer
- Engineering career
- Discipline: Mechanical engineering
- Institutions: Central Institute of Aviation Motors (CIAM); Zhukovsky Air Force Engineering Academy; Moscow Aviation Institute; Rybinsk Engine Plant No. 26; Klimov Experimental Design Bureau
- Projects: Klimov M-100; Klimov M-103; Klimov M-105 / VK-105PF; Klimov VK-107; Klimov VK-108; Klimov VK-1 (Soviet development of Rolls-Royce Nene); VK-1F (first Soviet turbojet with afterburner)
- Significant advance: Adaptation of Hispano-Suiza 12Y into the M-100 family of liquid-cooled V-12 engines
- Awards: Hero of Socialist Labour (1940, 1957); USSR State Prize (1941, 1943, 1946, 1949); Order of Lenin (five times)

Vladimir Yakovlevich Klimov ( Russian: Владимир Яковлевич Климов; July 11 (Julian) / July 23 (Gregorian) 1892 - 9 September 1962) was a Soviet aircraft engine designer. At the end of his professional career, he held the rank of Major General in the Engineering Service.

== Background and early life ==
Klimov was born 11 July (Julian) / 23 July (Gregorian) 1892 in Moscow.

The Klimov family came from migrant peasants; his father, Yakov Alekseevich Klimov, was from a peasant family in the village of Annino in the Vladimir Oblast. He had been sent to Moscow at an early age to earn money, rose from an apprentice to the owner of a craftsmen's artel, worked on construction contracts, became rich, bought a plot of land in Moscow and, having built an apartment building on it (a five-story building on the corner of the Garden Ring and Teterinsky Lane), became a homeowner. His mother, Praskovya Vasilyevna Ustinova, was from a peasant family in the neighboring village of Yerosovo. There were 8 children in the family.

From 1903, at the age of eleven, Klimov attended a special school in Moscow, where he trained as a mechanic, graduating in 1910. He then transferred to the Technical University, where he began to study internal combustion engines. He completed his practical training at a mechanical engineering factory in Petrograd. In 1916, Klimov graduated with a diploma thesis on aircraft engine design. He was subsequently offered a scholarship to continue his studies, but due to political events this became impossible. Following the revolution, Klimov worked for a time in the development department of an engine factory for motor vehicles.

== Career ==
In 1918 he began his work as a lecturer at the Moscow Technical University, the Zhukovsky Military Academy and the State Aviation Institute, and also worked as an aeronautical engineer in several aircraft factories and research institutes on various projects.

In his capacity as a member of the Air Force's Scientific and Technical Council, to which he had also been appointed, Klimov undertook several trips abroad to acquire licensing rights for various engines for the nascent military air force. In the early 1920s, he traveled to France and negotiated the production of a Hispano-Suiza engine. He also purchased 100 BMW engines in Germany in 1924 and, in 1928, acquired the rights to reproduce a French Gnome-Rhône engine, of which he bought an additional 200 units. Upon returning to the Soviet Union, he organized its production as technical director. From 1925 to 1930, he also contributed to the development of the M-12 and M-23 radial engines, as well as the M-13 V12 engine. In 1931 he became head of the department for gasoline engines at the Central Institute for Aircraft Engines, where he was also involved in testing the AM-34.

Based on his experiences during a trip to France in 1933, he founded OKB - 117, an engine design bureau, in Saint Petersburg in 1935, where he was appointed chief designer. There, under his leadership, the M-100 was developed from the French Hispano-Suiza 12 Ybr aircraft engine, which had been manufactured under license since 1934. This engine, as well as its successor, the M-103, was used in the SB-2 bomber. His team achieved its greatest success at this time with the development of the M-105 V12 engine, which was used in various aircraft during World War II, including the Yer-2 and Pe-2 bombers, the LaGG-3 fighter, and the Yakovlev Yak-1, -3, -7, and -9 series. Renamed VK-105 in honor of its designer, this engine, along with its various variants, became one of the most widely produced Soviet aircraft engines. Klimov received the State Prize for the design for the second time in 1943. In 1944 he was promoted to Major General in the Engineering Service.

During the Great Patriotic War (World War 2), V. Ya. Klimov made a contribution of 73,000 rubles to the Defense Fund, which was acknowledged by Joseph Stalin in a letter published in the Izvestia newspaper dated 4 March 1943.

After the war, Klimov's design bureau focused on the development of jet engines, taking its cues from the British Rolls-Royce Derwent and Nene turbines, which were subsequently produced as the RD-500 and RD-45. The RD-45 evolved into the first Soviet jet engine, the Klimov VK-1, and its derivatives, which powered the MiG-15 and MiG-17 fighter jets, the Il-28 tactical bomber, and other aircraft types. Approximately 20,000 VK-1 engines were produced, in addition to licensed production in Poland and China.

== Death and legacy ==
Vladimir Klimov died in Moscow on 9 September 1962. He was by then a five-time recipient of the Order of Lenin, a two-time Hero of Socialist Labor (1940, 1957), a four-time recipient of the State Prize (1941, 1943, 1946, 1949), a recipient of the Order of Suvorov (1944, 1945), and a full member of the USSR Academy of Sciences (1953). He is the author of the Atlas of Aircraft Engine Designs, published in two parts in 1935 and 1938.

The engine manufacturer Klimov, which emerged from his OKB, still bears his name today.

In 2002, a street in the Shevchenkivskyi district of Zaporizhzhia was named after V. Ya. Klimov. There is also an academician Klimov park in Zaporizhzhia.

== Literature ==
- Kopenhagen, Wilfried (2007). Lexikon Sowjetluftfahrt. Elbe-Dnjepr, Klitzschen. ISBN 978-3-933395-90-0..
- Kopenhagen, Wilfried (1984). "Vladimir Yakovlevich Klimov and his aircraft engines". Flieger-Jahrbuch 85/86. Transpress. ISSN 0428-5697.
- "K-22" - Battlecruiser / [under the general editorship of N. V. Ogarkov ]. - M .: Military Publishing House of the USSR Ministry of Defense , 1979. - 654 p. - ( Soviet Military Encyclopedia : in 8 volumes ; 1976-1980 , v. 4).
- Klimov Vladimir Yakovlevich / Kravetsky A. G. // Kireev - Congo. - M .: Great Russian Encyclopedia, 2009. - ( Big Russian Encyclopedia : [in 35 volumes] / chief editor Yu. S. Osipov ; 2004-2017, vol. 14). — ISBN 978-5-85270-345-3.
- Ponomarev A. N. Vladimir Yakovlevich Klimov, Sergey Petrovich Izotov // Soviet aviation designers.- M .: Voenizdat, 1977.- P. 266-269.
- V. Ya. Klimov. Hero of Socialist Labor, Major General of the Aviation Engineering Service. — " Air Fleet Equipment ". — 1944. — No. 11-12.
- Heroes of Labor/ Directory of Heroes of Socialist Labor and Cavaliers of the Order of Labor Glory of three degrees from Bashkortostan./ compiled by R. A. Valishin [and others]. - Ufa : Kitap, 2011. - 432 p .: ill. - ISBN 978-5-295-05228-6.
- Bashkir Encyclopedia / Ch. ed. M. A. Ilgamov. T. 3. - Ufa: ed. Bashkir Encyclopedia, 2007. − 672 p. — ISBN 978-5-88185-064-7.
