= Lawn-Boy =

Lawn mower company

Lawn-Boy is a brand of lawn mower, originally manufactured by the Evinrude Company in 1934 and owned since 1989 by Toro. It was the first one-handed reel power mower introduced to the American public. Evinrude purchased Johnson Motor Wheel Company from a New York stock brokerage firm a year later, and in 1936 they merged with the Outboard Marine and Manufacturing Company (OMC), continuing production of Lawn-Boy mowers until 1939, when it was temporarily put on hold to manufacture outboard motors for World War II.

In 1946, Joel G. (Jack) Doyle built the first rotary lawnmower for the Rotary Power Mower Company of Lamar, Missouri. Doyle accumulated orders for these mowers from Sears Roebuck, Gimbels, Spiegel, and other businesses. OMC then bought RPM in 1952, and changed the brand of the rotary lawn mower to the Lawn-Boy name.

In the 1950s, RPM facilities were converted to production line manufacturing to meet the high number of orders from bigger retailers such as Sears Roebuck and Spiegel.. Also, newer, quieter engines were introduced to reduce sound.

In 1963, the Lawn-Boy HQ and factory was moved from Lamar, Mo. to the Gale Products Facility's (another part of OMC) site in Galesburg, IL.

The next couple of decades included a long period of research and development as the company continued to expand, including overseas. Riding mowers, tillers, and snow blowers were introduced, as well as a new 2-stroke engine in 1970 that produced more power, with less weight and fewer parts. During this time the D-400 engine became popular.

In 1983, two factories were opened in Mississippi and Tennessee. Marketing and Engineering was moved to the Memphis, Tennessee facility.

In 1988, Lawn-Boy acquired Gilson Brothers Co., a Wisconsin-based manufacturer of outdoor power equipment and recreational equipment.

In 1989, with a dire need for cash, OMC sold Lawn-Boy to the Toro Company, and eventually consolidated to the Toro headquarters in Bloomington, Minnesota. In 1996, the brand hit a major milestone: they were the leaders in the market in terms of repurchasing. According to the research, almost 60% of people who were buying Lawn Boy power mowers had owned one of the brand’s products in the past. Since the acquisition by Toro, Lawn-Boy has introduced several new series of lawn mowers, including a new lineup of walk-behind mowers and an entirely new category of Zero Radius Turning mowers. Due to engine emissions regulations, Lawn-Boy had been forced to stop using their longtime 2-stroke engine that was favored for its light weight and simple operation. By 2012, Toro had moved all of its manufacturing operations away from Lawn-Boy and discontinued the production of most of its equipment, instead focusing on its other brands.

== See also ==
- Sensation Lawn Mowers
