= Hayter (lawn mowers) =

Manufacturer and distributor of garden machinery

- Type: Private limited company
- Industry: Horticultural equipment
- Founded: 1946; 80 years ago
- Headquarters: Spellbrook, Bishops Stortford, England
- Area served: United Kingdom
- Key people: Douglas Hayter (founder)
- Products: Lawn mowers
- Number of employees: 51–200
- Parent: Toro
- Website: www.hayter.co.uk

Hayter is a British high-end manufacturer and distributor of garden machinery, specialising in industrial and domestic lawn mowers. The company's headquarters are located in Spellbrook, Hertfordshire, where it was founded in 1946 by Douglas Hayter, a pioneer of the rotary mower. The company was awarded a Royal Warrant in 1960.

== History ==
The engineer Douglas Hayter (1914–2000) formed the idea of the rotary lawn mower after he visited the London Science Museum where he saw a 100-year-old, horse drawn rotary mower, in around 1946. He returned to his house in Spellbrook, Hertfordshire, where he built a frame using some accumulated parts and combined it with a second hand, two-stroke engine. The following day, the machine was in full working order. Local interest in his design grew and he made similar machines for his neighbours. He called it the Hayter Motor Scythe and put it into production in 1947. Among his first customers was Ipswich Town Council. Further work, including the installation of a safety stone guard, was fitted to the mower deck. Hayter changed the two-stroke engine to a four-stroke variant with a horizontal crankshaft. Hayter's business became a limited company in 1946.

The company was awarded a Royal Warrant in 1960 by Elizabeth II for the supply of horticultural equipment to the Sandringham Estate in Norfolk. To date, it is the sole supplier of lawn mowers to the British royal estate. Hayter was bought by the American horticultural company, Toro, in 2005.

== Products ==
Hayter supply two types of machine;

Petrol powered

- Spirit 41 AD - 41 cm cut width. Aluminium chassis, ABS polymer covers and underdeck. Pull-cord start, autodrive (drive speed 2.5 mph). Rear roller.
- Harrier 41 VS - 41 cm cut width. Push operated, pull start, rear roller, self-propelled engine with variable speed (set between 2.2 - 3.4 mph).
- Harrier 41 ES - 41 cm cut width, electric push button start, self-propelled engine with variable speed lever (set between 2.1 - 3.3 mph), two piece rear roller.
- Harrier 41 PRO - 41 cm cut width, fixed speed (3.2 mph), auto-drive engine, aluminium cutter deck and steel rear roller.
- Harrier 48 – 48 cm cut width, rear roller, variable speed (approximately 2 tennis courts), adjustable drive speed of 2.1 - 3.3 mph, split rear roller.
- Harrier 48 BBC - 48 cm cut width, variable speed (1.8 - 3.3 mph), blade brake clutch system (allows you to stop the blade without turning off the engine), self propelled, split rear roller.
- Harrier 48 – 48 cm cut width, rear roller, variable speed, push-to-start electric starter, drive speed of 2.1 - 3.3 mph, split rear roller.
- Harrier 48 PRO - 48 cm cut width, rear-roller, Crank-Safe Blade Brake Clutch (BBC) System, fixed speed (3.2 mph), auto-drive, aluminium cutter deck, steel rear roller.
- Harrier 56 – 56 cm cut width, large rear roller (53 cm), intuitive Sens-a-Speed system can be set between 1.0 - 2.9 mph, split rear roller.
- Harrier 56 – 56 cm cut width, rear roller (56 cm), auto driven, intuitive Sens-a-Speed system to adjust the drive speed to your walking pace (1.0 - 2.9 mph), Blade Brake Clutch (BBC) System.
- Harrier 56 ES - 56 cm cut width, rear roller (56 cm), auto driven, intuitive Sens-a-Speed system (1.0 - 2.9 mph), push-button electric start.
- Harrier 56 PRO, 56 cm cut width, Crank-Safe Blade Brake Clutch System, fixed speed (3.2 mph), auto-drive, aluminium cutter deck, steel rear roller.
- Osprey 46 - Push Mower, 46 cm cut width, 4-wheel, mulch plug and 3-in-1 blade that can recycle grass clippings by turning them into grass mulch.
- Osprey 46 - auto drive, 46 cm cut width, 4-wheel, fixed speed (2.0 mph), mulch plug and 3-in-1 blade that can recycle grass clippings by turning them into grass mulch.

Battery powered

- Hawk 43 – 43 cm cut width, push operated, 60V - cordless.
- Hawk 43 AD 60V - 43 cm cut width, self propelled, variable speed controlled, 60V - cordless.
- Harrier 41 – 41 cm cut width, self propelled, variable speed controlled 60V, adjustable speed of 1.8 - 3.0 mph in auto mode and 2.1 - 3.3 mph in Boost Max mode, two-piece rear roller.
- Harrier 48 – 48 cm cut width, 60v - cordless, Power Boost software, self-propelled engine with adjustable speed of 1.7 - 2.9 mph in auto mode and 2.0 - 3.2 mph in Boost Max mode. two piece rear roller.
- Osprey 46 – 46 cm cut width, 60v - cordless, auto-drive Power-Boost technology. No rear roller.

Specialist products

- Scarifier - 36 cm cut width. Push, pull start, petrol driven.
