= Mikoyan-Gurevich I-320 =

Type of aircraft

I-320
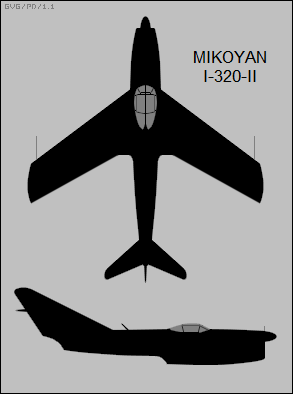
- Silhouettes of the Mikoyan-Gurevich I-320

General information
- Type: All-weather interceptor aircraft
- National origin: Soviet Union
- Manufacturer: Mikoyan-Gurevich
- Status: Prototypes
- Number built: 2

History
- First flight: 16 April 1949

The Mikoyan-Gurevich I-320 (USAF/DoD designation: Type 18) was a prototype Soviet long-range all-weather interceptor aircraft of the late 1940s-early 1950s. Only two were made, with no production following.

== Design and development ==
In January 1948, the Soviet Union issued a specification for a long-range, all-weather Interceptor, capable of intercepting hostile aircraft far from the attacker's targets by day and night. The specification resulted in designs from several design bureaus, including Mikoyan-Gurevich, who proposed the Izdeliya R ("Article R") or I-320, Lavochkin (the La-200) and Sukhoi (the Su-15).

The Mikoyan-Gurevich design, was like the other two competing aircraft, a twin-engined swept-wing aircraft, with the fuselage housing the engines in tandem, with one at the bottom of the forward fuselage and the second in the rear fuselage. The engines were fed from an inlet in the nose, which split into three ducts, the first feeding the forward engine and the other two passing around the cockpit to feed the rear engine. The crew of two (aircraft commander and radar operator, who were provided with dual controls) sat on individual ejector seats in a side-by-side, unpressurised cockpit. The wings, which were of similar layout to those of the smaller MiG-15 day fighter, were swept at an angle of 35 degrees, and were fitted with large wing fences. Air intercept radar, at first Toryii and later the much improved Korshun, was fitted in a radome in the upper lip of the air intake.

The first prototype, designated R-1, was powered by two 22.25 kN (5,000 lbf) thrust Klimov RD-45Fs, unlicensed copies of the British Rolls-Royce Nene engine, and was armed with two Nudelman N-37 cannon, positioned on either side of the air intake. It made its maiden flight on 16 April 1949. A second prototype, R-2, which differed in having more powerful (26.25 kN (5,900 lbf)) Klimov VK-1 engines, a third N-37 cannon and an improved windscreen and canopy followed in November 1949. The R-2 was badly damaged when a cannon shell exploded, and the aircraft was rebuilt, with the wings modified, adding a third fence, flying again as the R-03 on 30 March 1950.

No production followed, as the specification to which the I-320 was built was superseded by a later requirement that led to the production of the Yakovlev Yak-25. The two prototypes continued in use by the MiG design bureau as testbeds for the development of avionics.

== Specifications (I-320 (R-2/3)) ==
Data from MiG: Fifty Years of Secret Aircraft Design

General characteristics

- Crew: 2
- Length: 15.775 m (51 ft 9 in)
- Wingspan: 14.2 m (46 ft 7 in)
- Wing area: 41.2 m^{2} (443 sq ft)
- Empty weight: 7,460 kg (16,446 lb)
- Gross weight: 10,725 kg (23,645 lb)
- Max takeoff weight: 12,095 kg (26,665 lb)
- Powerplant: 2 × Klimov VK-1 centrifugal flow turbojet engines, 26.45 kN (5,950 lbf) thrust each

Performance

- Maximum speed: 1,090 km/h (680 mph, 590 kn) at sea level
- Maximum speed: Mach 0.88
- Range: 1,205 km (749 mi, 651 nmi)
- Service ceiling: 15,500 m (50,900 ft)

Armament

- Guns: 3 × 37 mm Nudelman N-37 autocannon

== Bibliography ==
- Belyakov, R.A. and J. Marmain. MiG: Fifty Years of Secret Aircraft Design. Shrewsbury, UK: Airlife, 1994. ISBN 1-85310-488-4.
- Green, William and Gordon Swanborough. The Complete Book of Fighters. New York: Smithmark, 1994. ISBN 0-8317-3939-8.
- Gunston, Bill. The Osprey Encyclopedia of Russian Aircraft 1875–1995. London, Osprey, 1995. ISBN 1-85532-405-9.
- "Plane Facts: The first all-weather MiG". Air Enthusiast, March 1973, Vol 4 No 3. p. 40.
