= Sukhoi Su-15 (1949) =

Experimental interceptor aircraft

Su-15
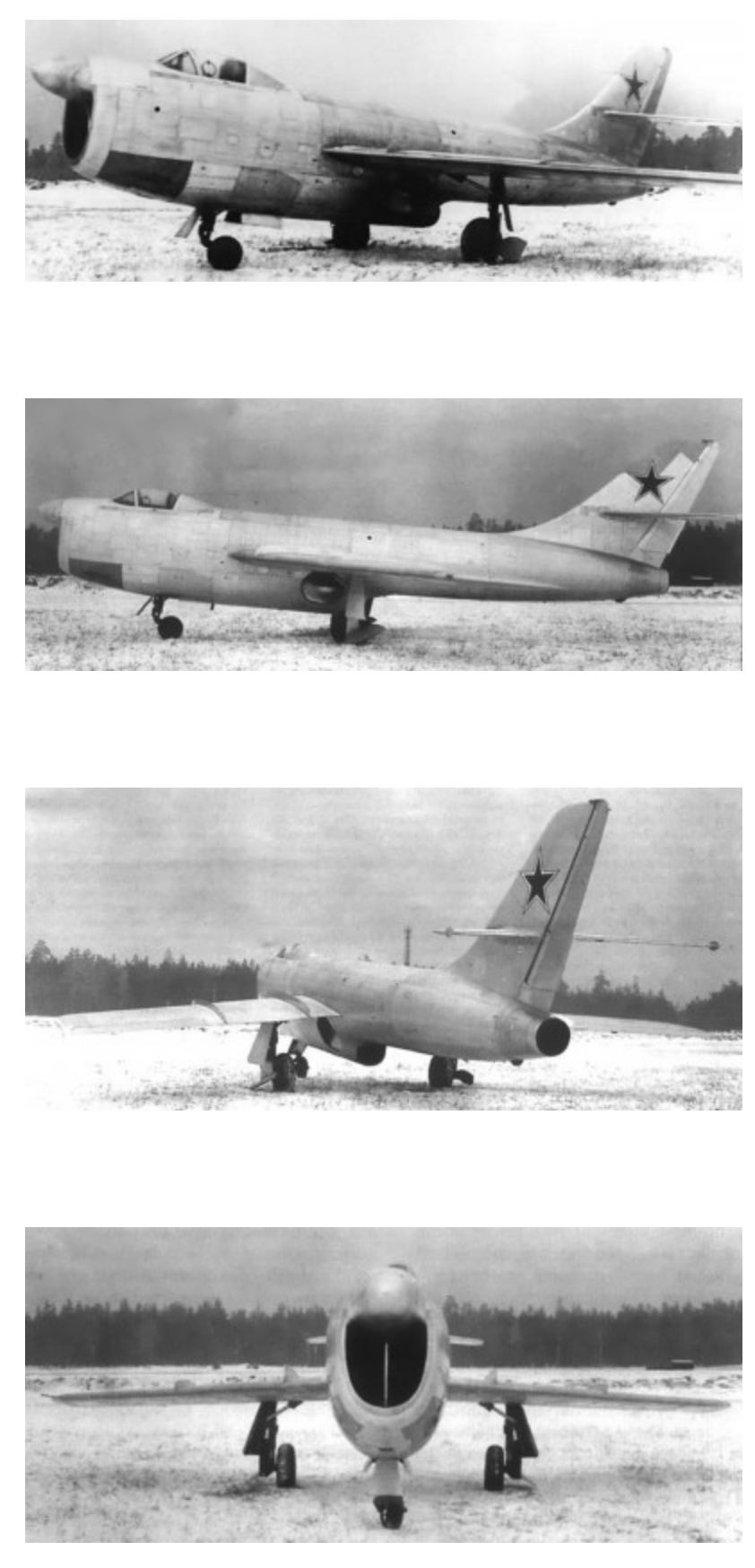
- Su-15 experimental interceptor

General information
- Type: Interceptor
- Manufacturer: Sukhoi
- Designer: Pavel Sukhoi
- Status: Prototype
- Primary user: Soviet Air Force
- Number built: 1

History
- First flight: 11 January 1949

The Sukhoi Su-15 (Aircraft P) was a prototype Soviet all-weather interceptor which never reached production.

== Development ==
The Su-15 was an early attempt at an all-weather jet-powered interceptor. Its development was ordered by the Soviet government in March 1947, with the approval of the Sukhoi Design Bureau's preliminary midwing design featuring a pressurized cabin, radar, swept wings and tandem engines, similar to that already attempted by the Lavochkin La-200 and Mikoyan-Gurevich I-320. Per TsAGI, the sweep of the wings was selected to be 35 degrees. The first prototype was completed on 25 October 1948 — only four months after its construction had started. The Su-15 first flew on 11 January 1949, piloted by Sukhoi test pilot G. M. Shiyanov. In testing, Su-15 reached 1032 km/h (557 knots, 641 mph; Mach 0.888) at 4,550 metres (14,930 ft) and 985 km/h (532 knots, 612 mph; Mach 0.926) at 10,950 metres (35,930 ft), but experienced excess vibration at speeds above Mach 0.87. During the 39th flight on 3 June 1949, the aircraft developed severe vibration, forcing the test pilot S.N. Anokhin to eject. The exact cause of the accident was never determined. At the time of the accident, 90% of the flight test program had been completed, over the course of 42 flights with a total flight time of 20 hours, 15 minutes. The program was subsequently terminated, and the second prototype was not completed.

The Su-15 was an all-metal mid-wing monoplane with a 35° swept wing. The aircraft had several very unusual design features. Its twin Klimov RD-45 engines were positioned in tandem rather than side-by-side, due to their large diameter. The front engine sat low with its exhaust under the middle of the fuselage. The rear engine nozzle was at the tip of the aft fuselage. The cockpit had to be offset to the left to make room for the air intake ducting for the rear engine.

The wing had two spars with two wing fences ranging the entire chord, with hydraulically operated ailerons and Fowler flaps. The air intake was at the nose and was centrally divided by a central web. At the rear, two-start rockets were mounted and also two air brakes.

== Operators ==
Soviet Union

- Soviet Air Force

== Specifications (Su-15) ==
Data from Shavrov, Green, and OKB Sukhoi : a history of the design bureau and its aircraft

General characteristics

- Crew: 1
- Length: 15.44 m (50 ft 8 in)
- Wingspan: 12.87 m (42 ft 3 in)
- Wing area: 36 m^{2} (390 sq ft)
- Airfoil: TsAGI S7s-12
- Empty weight: 7,409 kg (16,334 lb)
- Gross weight: 10,437 kg (23,010 lb)
- Fuel capacity: 2,768 L (731 US gal; 609 imp gal) usable fuel
- Powerplant: 2 × Klimov RD-45F centrifugal-flow turbojet engines, 21.6 kN (4,850 lbf) thrust each

Performance

- Maximum speed: 985 km/h (612 mph, 532 kn) at 10,950 m (35,930 ft)

1,045 km/h (649 mph; 564 kn) at 5,000 m (16,000 ft)
1,032 km/h (641 mph; 557 kn) at sea level

- Maximum speed: Mach 0.926
- Range: 1,050 km (650 mi, 570 nmi)
- Service ceiling: 15,000 m (49,000 ft)
- Time to altitude: 5,000 m (16,000 ft) in 2 minutes 30 seconds
- Wing loading: 59.4 kg/m^{2} (12.2 lb/sq ft)
- Thrust/weight: 0.43
- Take-off run: 450 m (1,480 ft)
- Landing run: 600 m (2,000 ft)

Armament

- Guns: 2 × 37 mm (1.45 in) Nudelman N-37 cannon, 110 rpg

Avionics

- Toriy radar

== See also ==
Aircraft of comparable role, configuration, and era

- Mikoyan-Gurevich I-320
- Lavochkin La-200
