= D-400 engine =

D-400 series engine
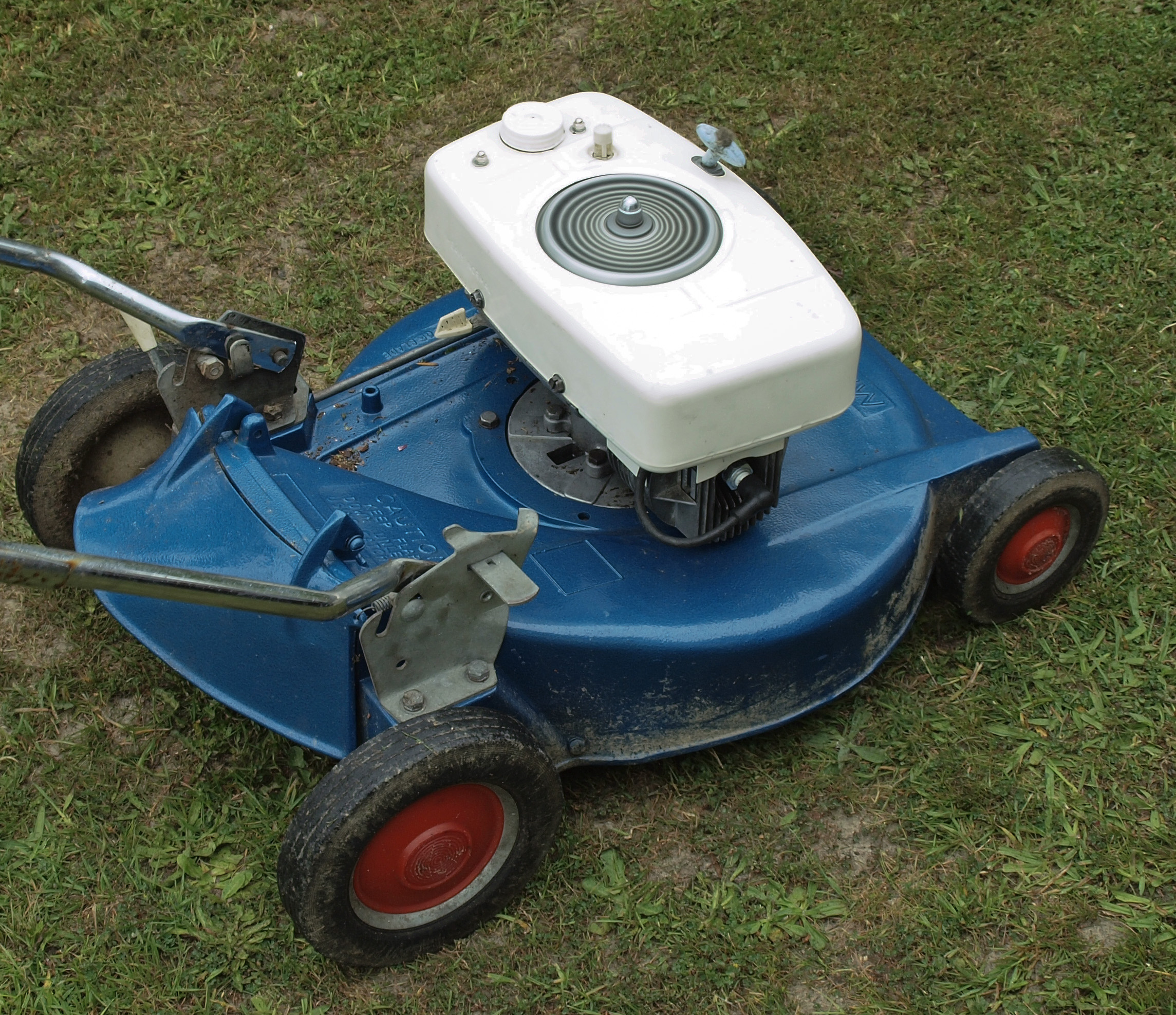
- Restored Masport Iron Horse engine

Overview
- Manufacturer: Outboard Marine Corporation (OMC); Lawn-Boy
- Also called: Iron Horse
- Production: 1954--1977

Layout
- Configuration: Single-cylinder 2-stroke
- Displacement: 108.99 cc (6.651 cu in)
- Cylinder bore: 60.325 mm (2.3750 in)
- Piston stroke: 38.1 mm (1.50 in)
- Cylinder block material: Aluminum
- Cylinder head material: Aluminum
- Compression ratio: 4.5:1

Combustion
- Fuel system: Float carburetor
- Fuel type: Petrol
- Oil system: 16:1-32:1 pre-mixed fuel:oil mix
- Cooling system: Air-cooled

Output
- Power output: 3.5 hp (2.6 kW)

Chronology
- Successor: D-600

The D-400 series engine or the Iron Horse engine was a light-duty two-stroke engine used for powering lawnmowers produced from the 1950s to the late 1970s. D-400 engines were single-cylinder engines designed and manufactured by the Outboard Marine Corporation (OMC; Johnson and Evinrude) for Lawn-Boy and Masport. The D-400 engines displaced 109 cc, generated 3.5 hp (2.6 kW) of power, and operated in the range of 2400-3300 RPM.

== Description ==
The engines have a distinctive rectangular cowling that has created a nickname of brick-top mowers. Another distinctive feature is the two-finger vertical recoil starter. The kidney-shaped muffler and exhaust unit is mounted beneath the mowers' deck and gives the engine a small, low profile design when compared to the newer and more powerful lawnmower engines. The ignition system employs a magneto, points, and a condenser (capacitor) set-up with an unusual spark-advance system which utilised a weight on the crankshaft to adjust the spark-advance amount depending on engine speed. The sprung governor was also unusual with a throw-yoke which operated under the flywheel and was linked to the throttle. The carburetor was a float design and fed into a pair of reed valves.

In New Zealand and Australia, Masport also known in New Zealand as "Charlie Gamble" offered the D-400 engine on their Premier, Premier II, Rancher, Rotacut, and Tornado models. In this Oceania market, the D-400 was called the Iron Horse engine.
