= Arthur Sicard =

Canadian inventor (1876–1946)

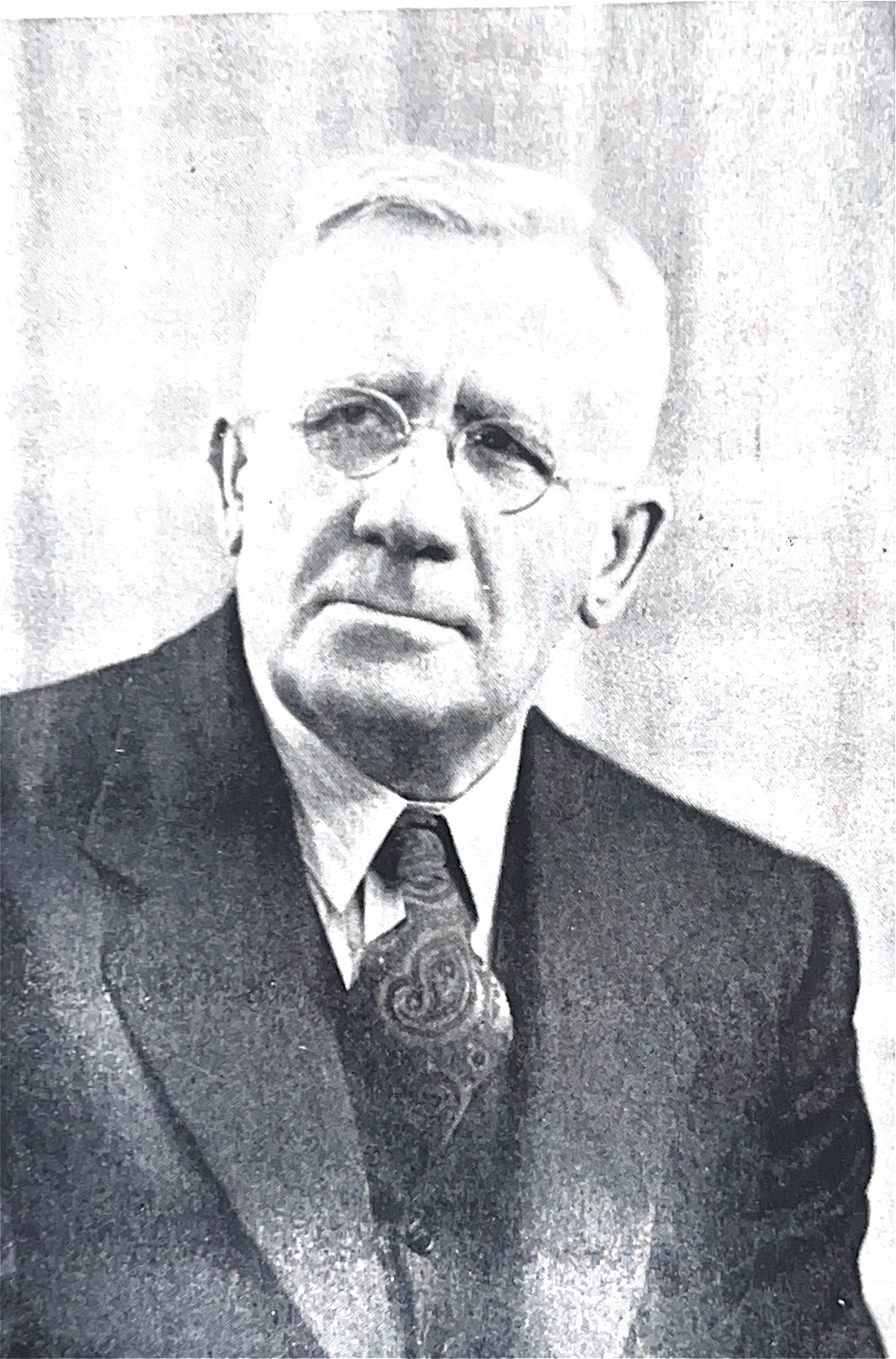
- Photograph of inventor Arthur Sicard 1/18/1932
- Born: December 17, 1876; Saint-Leonard, Quebec, Canada
- Died: September 13, 1946 (aged 69)
- Occupations: inventor; engineer
- Spouses: Rose-Anna LaPierre (m. 1900; death 1907); Elma Vézina (m. 1911–1946)
- Children: 5

Arthur Sicard (December 17,1876 - September 13, 1946) was a Québécois engineer. He is generally considered the inventor of the snow blower in the early 20th century. He was a contemporary of Joseph-Armand Bombardier the inventor of the snowmobile.

== Biography ==
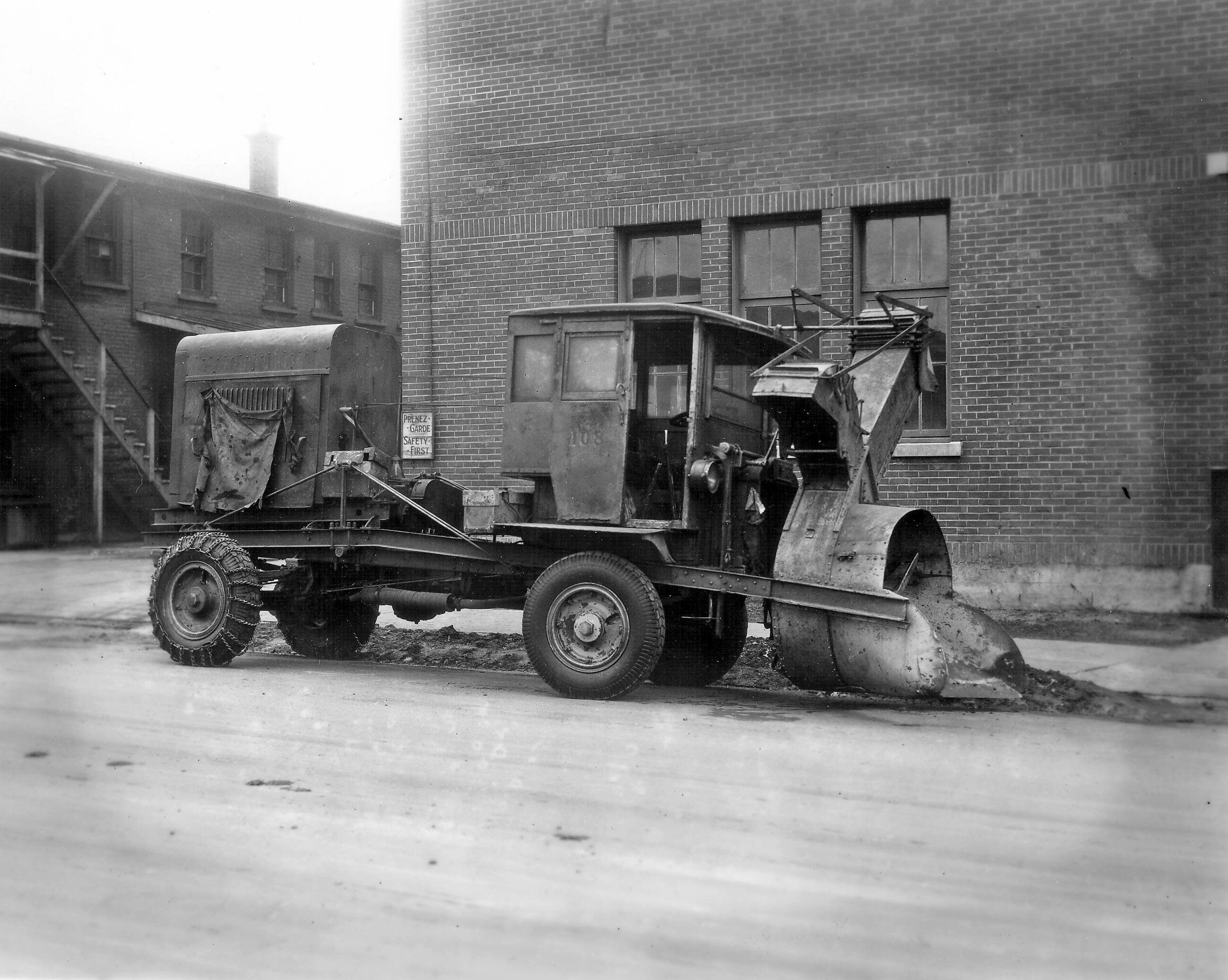
Snowblower, Montréal, 1930

At the start of the 20th century, Sicard worked as a farmer in Saint-Léonard

Seeing the rotating blades of his neighbor's harvester, Sicard had the idea to apply the same principle to remove snow. He developed his invention in 1925 and, in 1927, he sold his first snowblower in Outremont under the name Sicard snow plow and snowblower’. He founded Sicard Industries in Sainte-Thérèse, Québec, which was later acquired by SMI-Snowblast Inc. of Watertown. It still exists as a subsidiary of the company as Sicard SSI, in Knowlton (Québec). The first snowblower from Québec is now housed in a warehouse of the Canada Science and Technology Museum.

== See also ==
- Snowblower
- Snowmobile
