= Klimov VK-1 =

First Soviet jet engine

VK-1
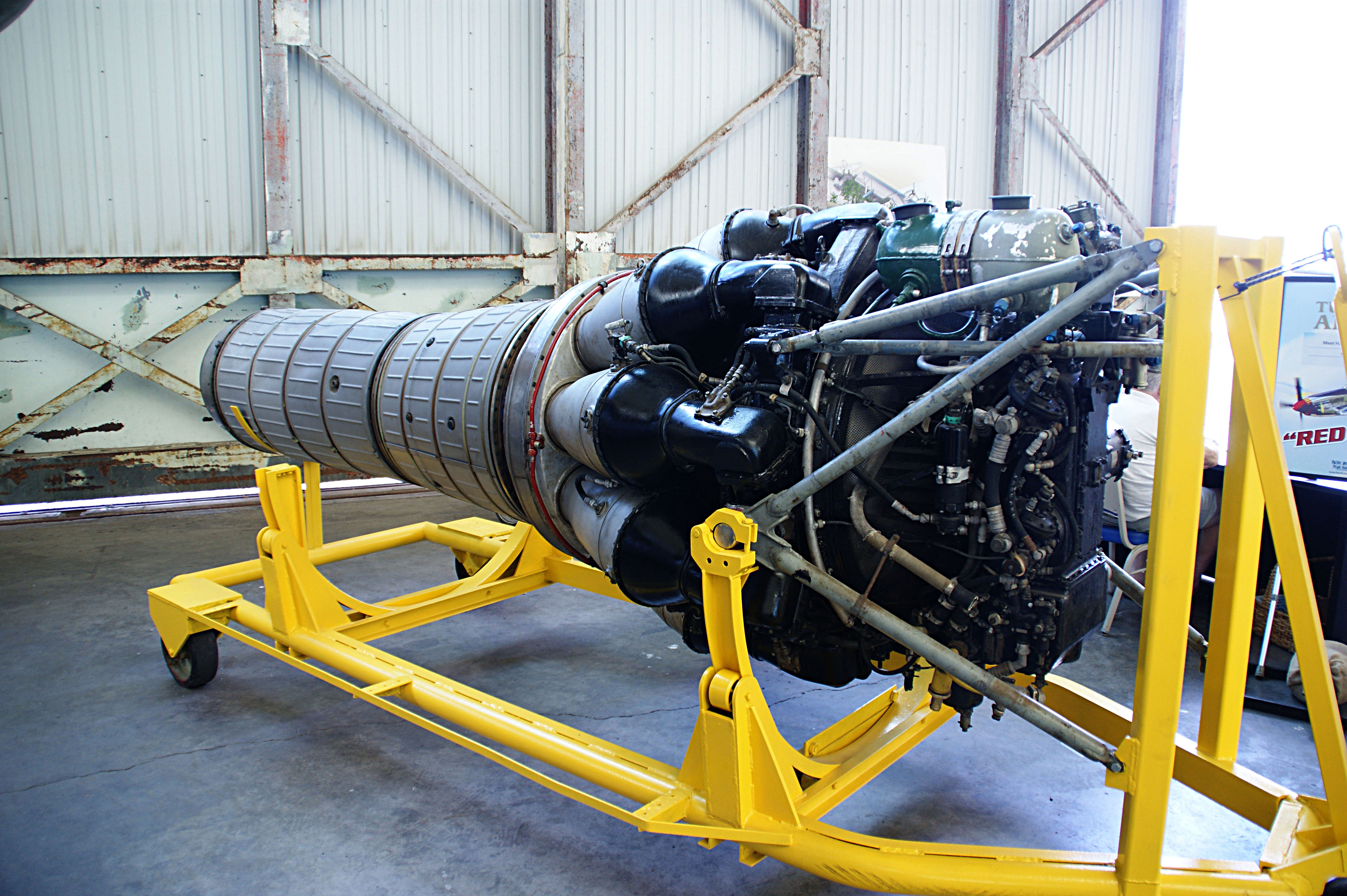
- Type: Turbojet
- Manufacturer: Klimov
- First run: 1947
- Major applications: Mikoyan-Gurevich MiG-15; Ilyushin Il-28
- Developed from: Rolls-Royce Nene

The Klimov VK-1 was the first Soviet jet engine to see significant production. It was developed by Vladimir Yakovlevich Klimov and first produced by the GAZ 116 works. Derived from the Rolls-Royce Nene, the engine was also built under licence in China as the Wopen WP-5.

== Design and development ==
Immediately after World War II, the Soviet Union manufactured copies of first generation German Junkers 004 and BMW 003 engines, which were advanced designs with poor durability, limited by Germany's shortage of rare metals in wartime. However, in 1946, before the Cold War had really begun, the new British Labour government under the prime minister, Clement Attlee, keen to improve diplomatic relations with the Soviet Union, authorised Rolls-Royce to export 40 Rolls-Royce Nene centrifugal flow turbojet engines. In 1958 it was discovered during a visit to Beijing by Whitney Straight, then deputy chairman of Rolls-Royce, that this engine had been copied without license to power the MiG-15 'Fagot', first as the RD-45, and after initial problems of metallurgy forced the Soviet engineers to develop a slightly redesigned (and metallurgically closer) copy, the engine had then entered production as the Klimov VK-1 (Rolls-Royce later attempted to claim £207m in license fees, without success).

The RD-45 was improved to produce the VK-1, which differed from the Nene in having larger combustion chambers, a larger turbine, and revised induction giving greater airflow through the engine, raised from 41 kg/s for the Nene, to 45 kg/s. The VK-1F model added the afterburner.

The engine featured a centrifugal compressor, requiring a larger-diameter fuselage than aircraft featuring axial compressor designs that had already appeared during World War II in Germany and Great Britain.

== Applications ==
The VK-1 was used to power the MiG-15 'Fagot' and MiG-17 'Fresco' fighters and the Il-28 'Beagle' bomber. Some of these engines are in use today in Russia mounted on trucks and railroad cars as snow blowers and ice melters.

== Specifications (VK-1) ==
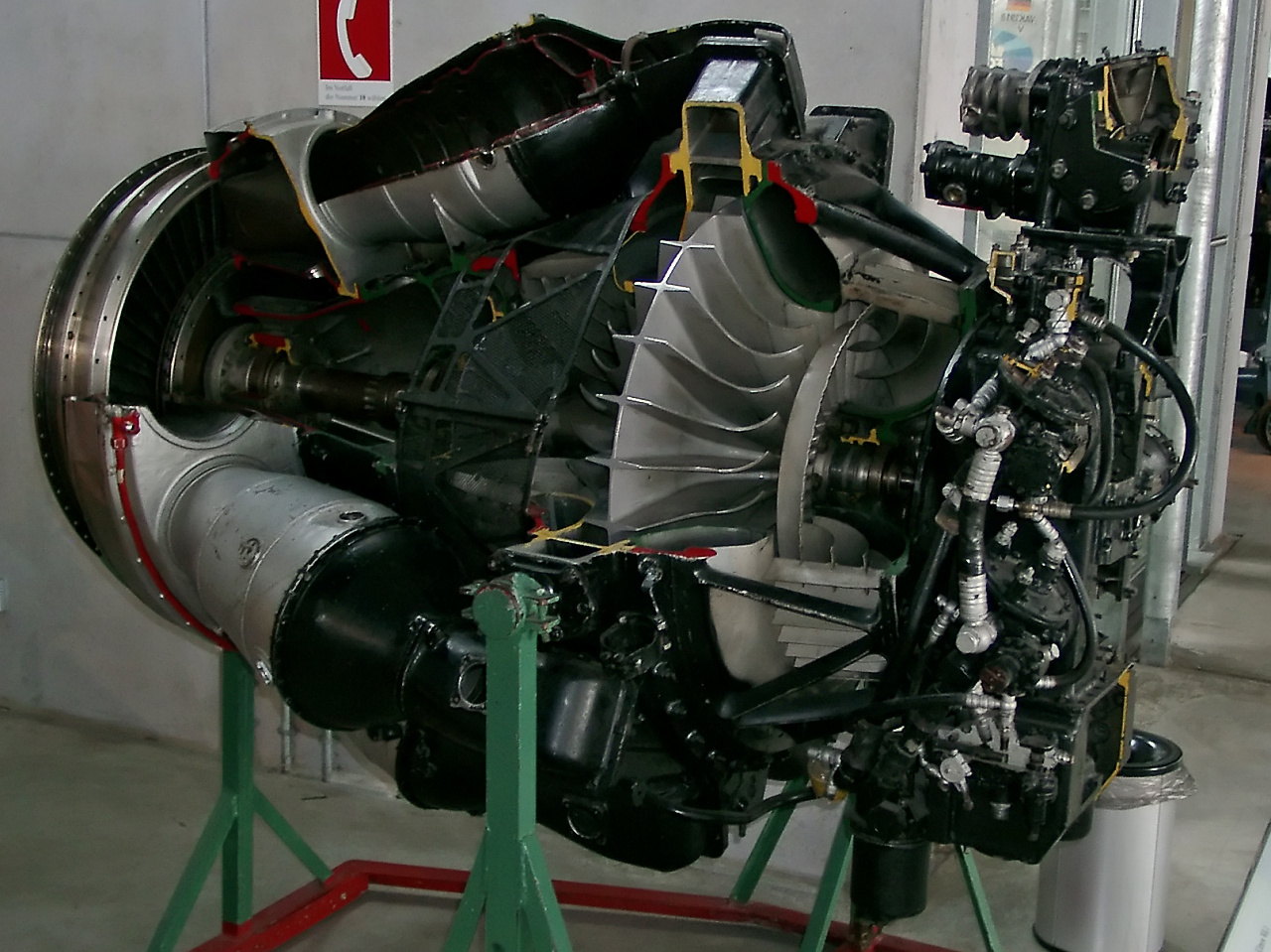
Sectioned Klimov VK-1

==== General characteristics ====
- Type: Turbojet
- Length: 2,600 mm (102 in)
- Diameter: 1,300 mm (51 in)
- Dry weight: 872 kg (1,922 lb)

==== Components ====
- Compressor: Centrifugal compressor
- Combustors: Nine can combustion chambers
- Turbine: single stage axial

==== Performance ====
- Maximum thrust: 26.5 kN (5,955 lbf)
- Specific fuel consumption: 109.1 kg/(kN·h) (1.07 lb/(lbf·h))
- Thrust-to-weight ratio: 3.1

== See also ==
- List of aircraft engines
