= Snow blower =

Tool for snow removal

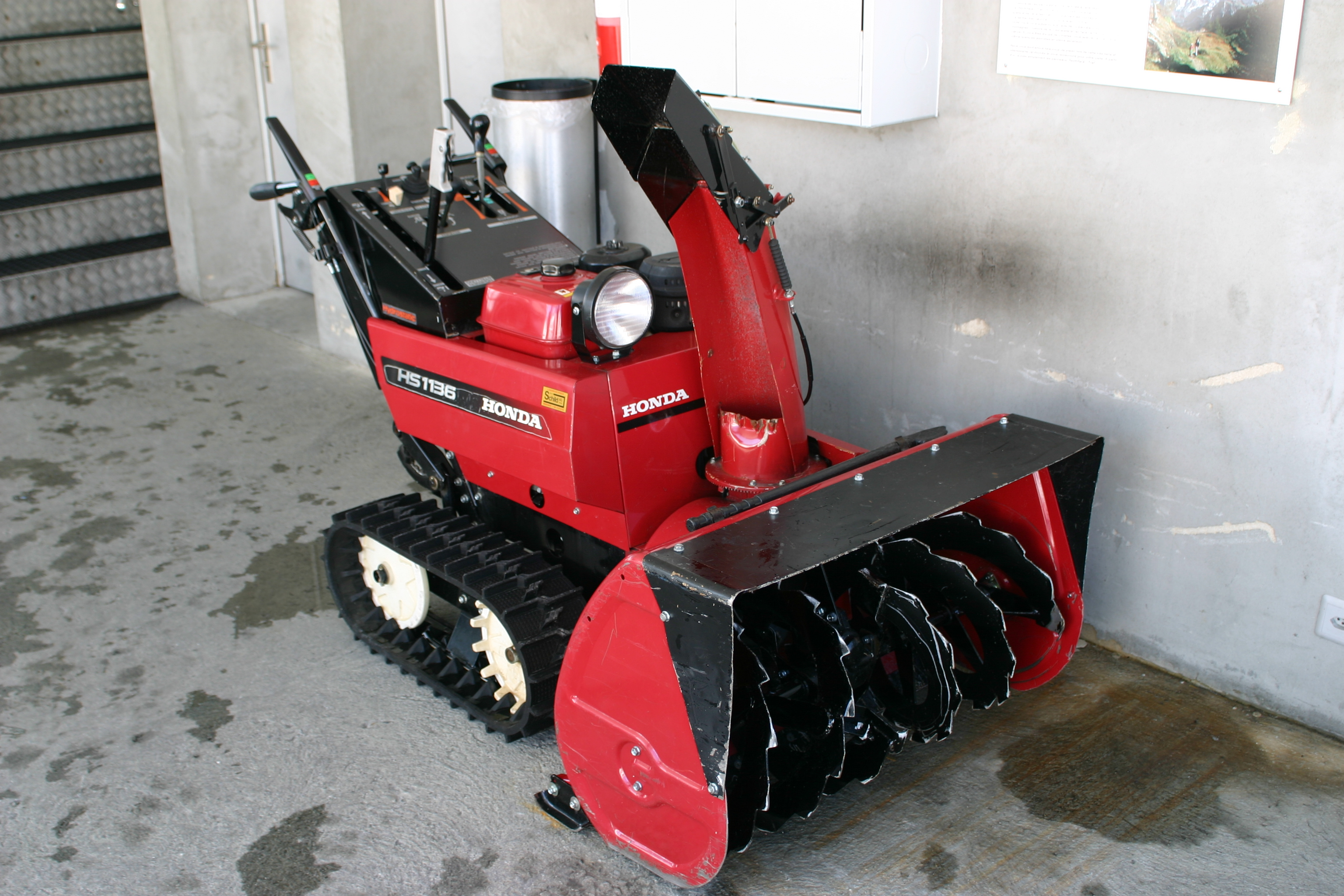
A heavy-duty walk-behind two-stage snow blower.

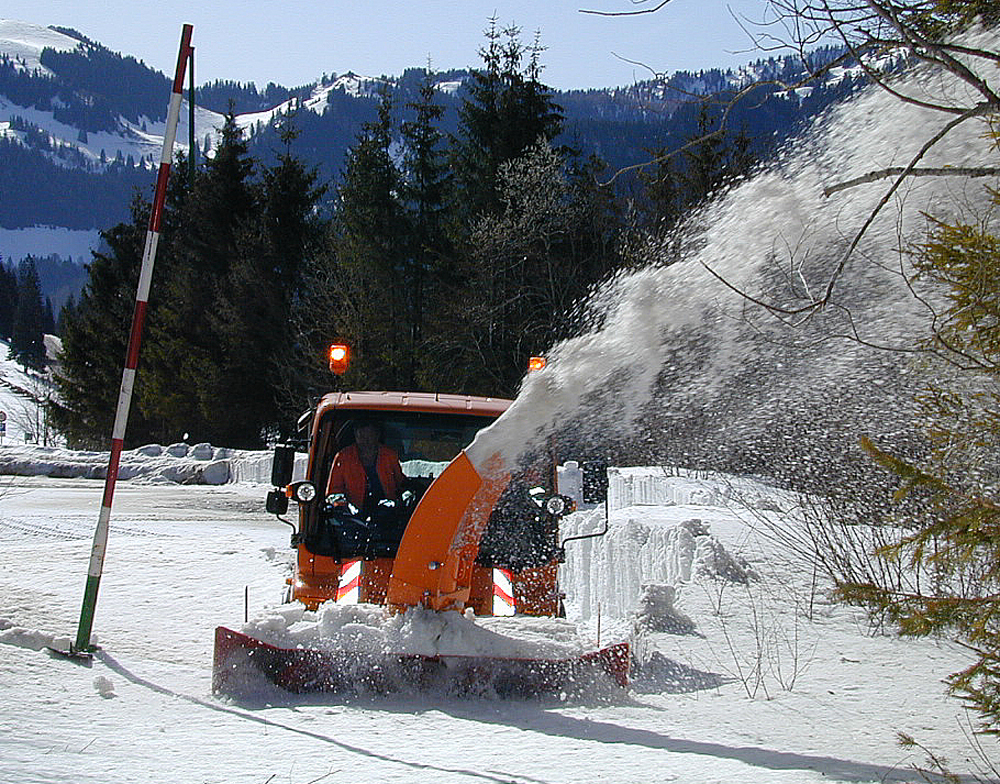
A snow blower at work in Upper Bavaria, Germany, 2005

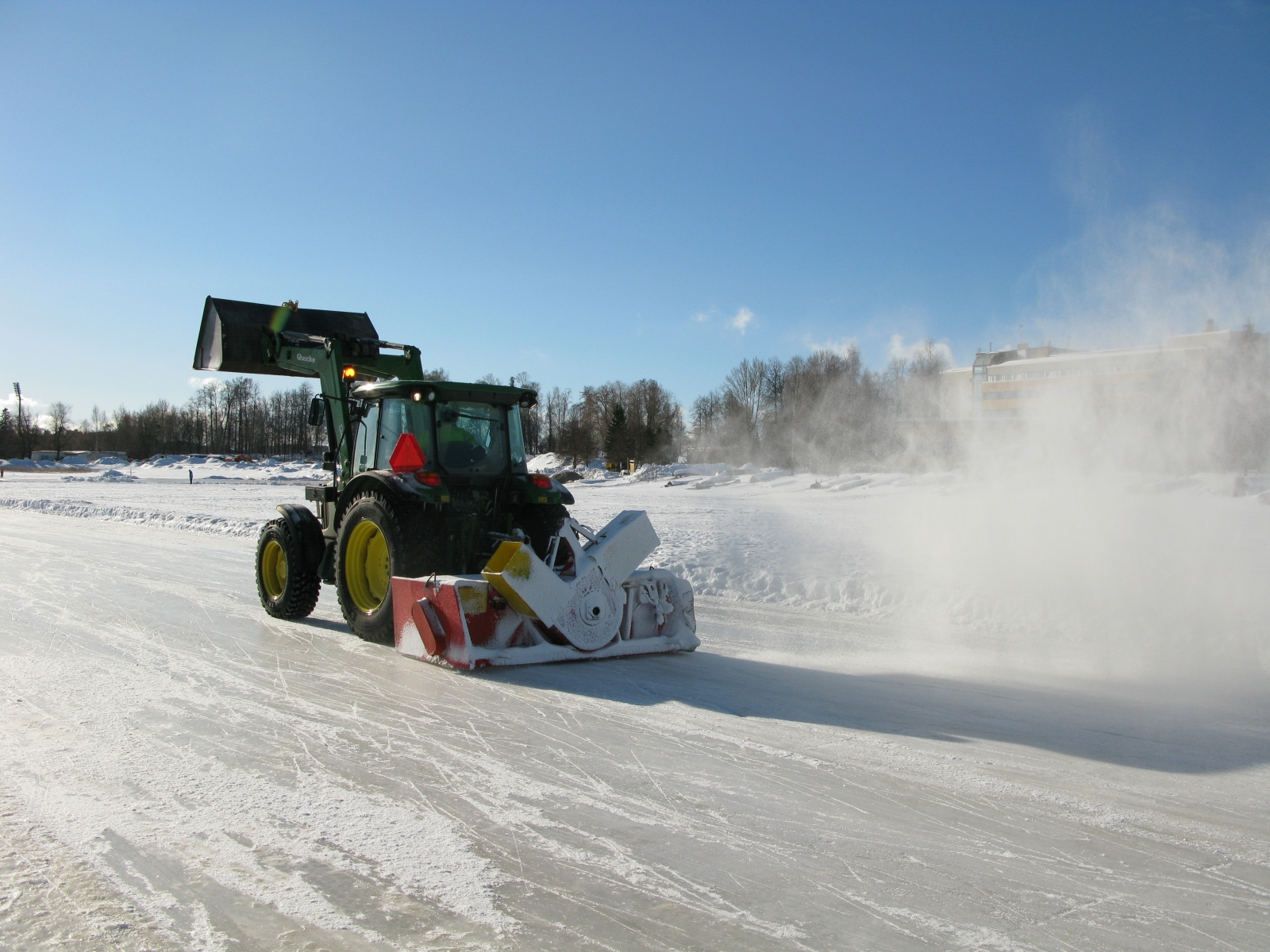
A tractor with a snow blower in Kuopio, Finland

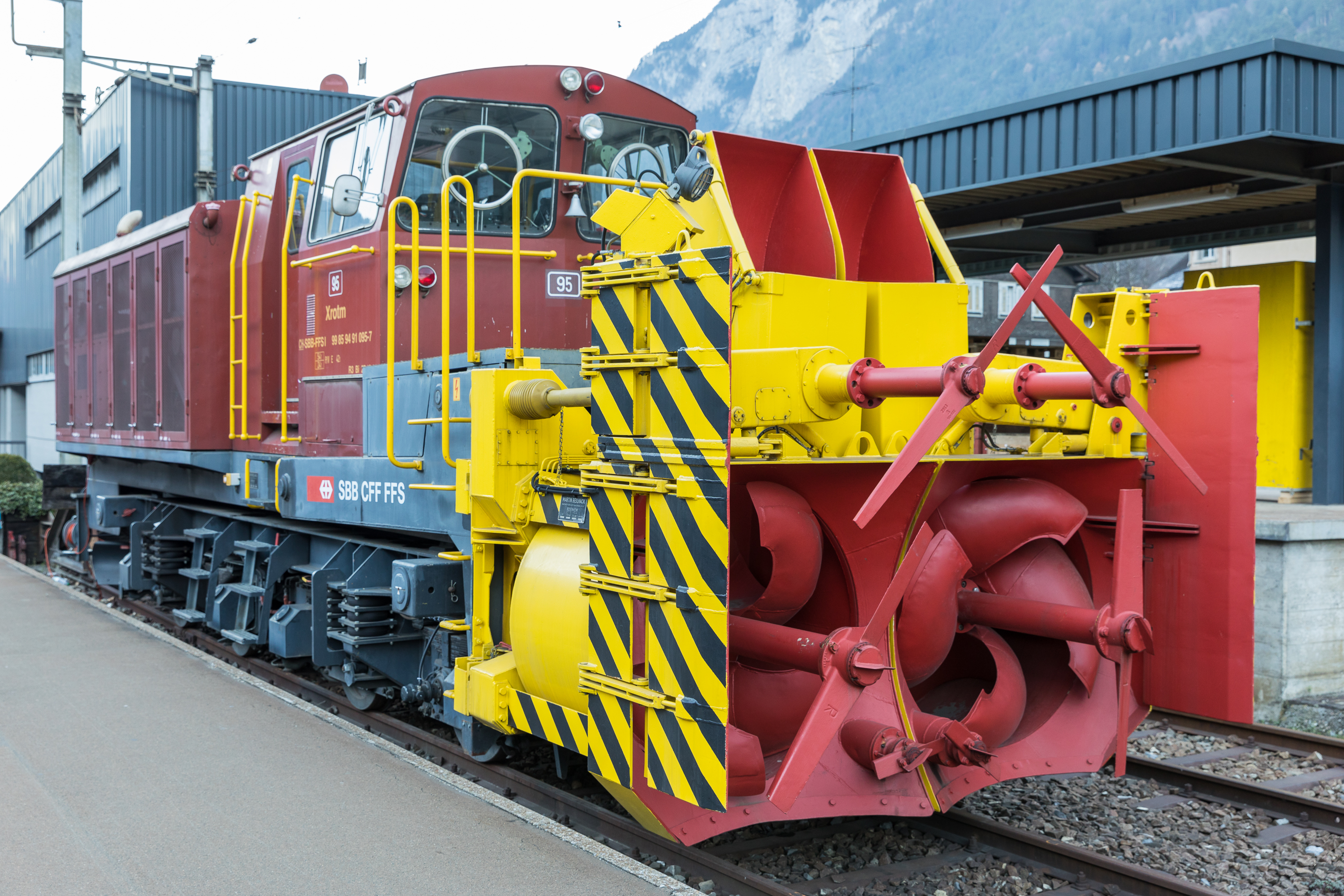
A Swiss railway snow thrower at Erstfeld railway station, 2016

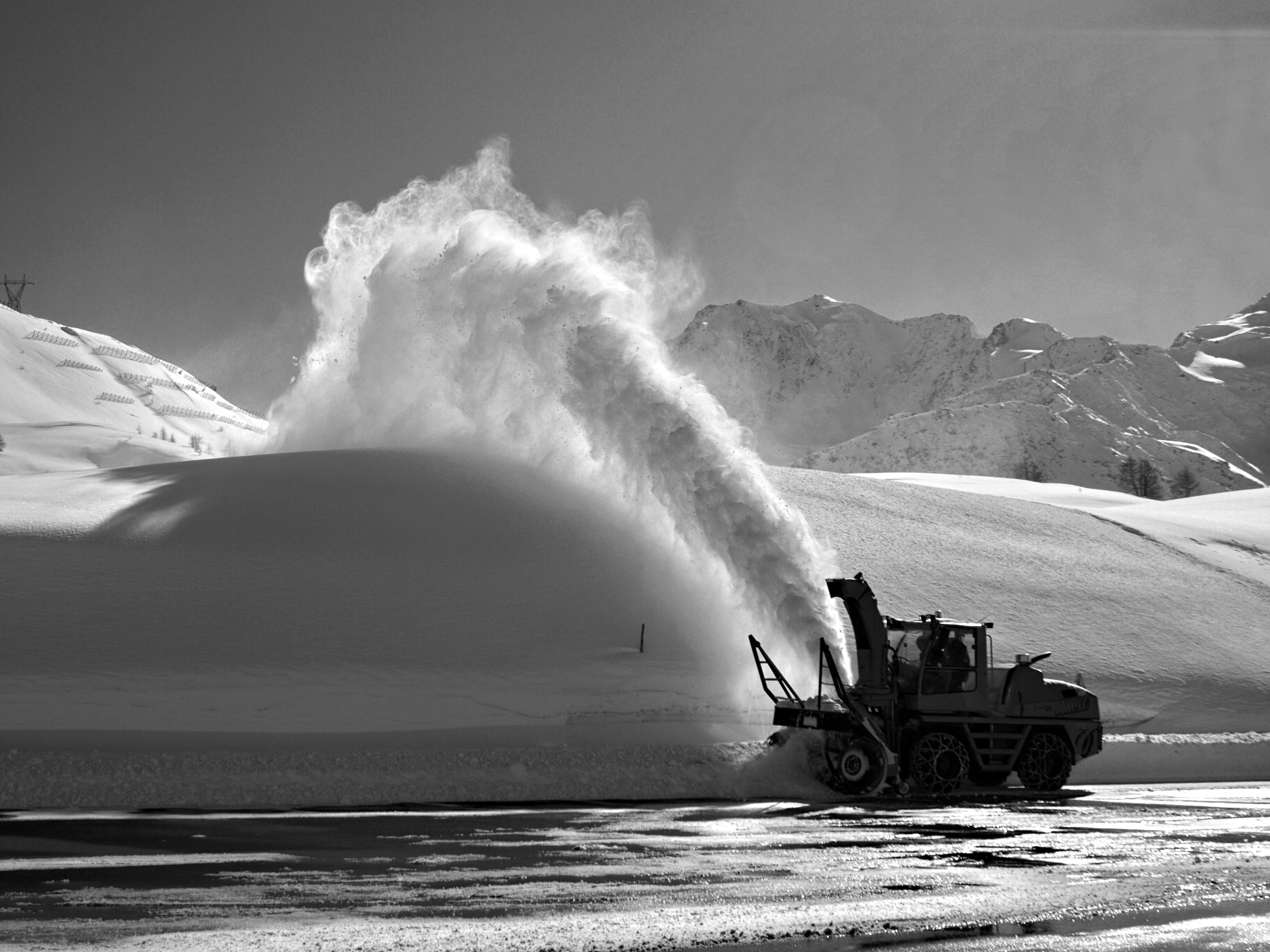
Snow thrower on Simplon Pass

A snow blower or snowblower or snow thrower is a machine for removing snow from an area where it is problematic, such as a driveway, sidewalk, roadway, railroad track, ice rink, or runway. The commonly used term "snow blower" is a misnomer, as the snow is moved using an auger or impeller instead of being blown (by air). It can use either electric power (line power or battery) or a gasoline or diesel engine to throw snow to another location or into a truck to be hauled away. This is in contrast with the action of snow plows, which push snow to the front or side. Typically, the snow is discharged to one side, but most snow throwers have a movable chute that can direct snow across the full 180 degrees of motion in front of the appliance.

Snow blowers range from the very small, capable of removing only a few inches (a few more cm) of light snow in an 18 to 20 in (460 to 510 mm) path, to the very large, mounted onto heavy-duty winter service vehicles and capable of moving 20-foot (6 m) wide, or wider, swaths of heavy snow up to 6 feet (1.8 m) deep.

Snow blowers can generally be divided into two classes: single-stage and two-stage. On a single-stage snow blower, the auger (the paddle mechanism visible from the front) pulls snow into the machine and directs it out of a discharge chute. The auger contacts the ground, making single-stage snow blowers unsuitable for use on unpaved surfaces. On a two-stage snow blower, the auger pulls snow into the machine and feeds it into a high-speed impeller, which in turn directs it out of a discharge chute. Two-stage snow blowers can generally handle deeper snow depths than single-stage ones, and because their augers don't touch the ground, they can be used on unpaved surfaces.

Depending on the design, snowblowers can be pressed into service throwing other things, such as water.

== History ==
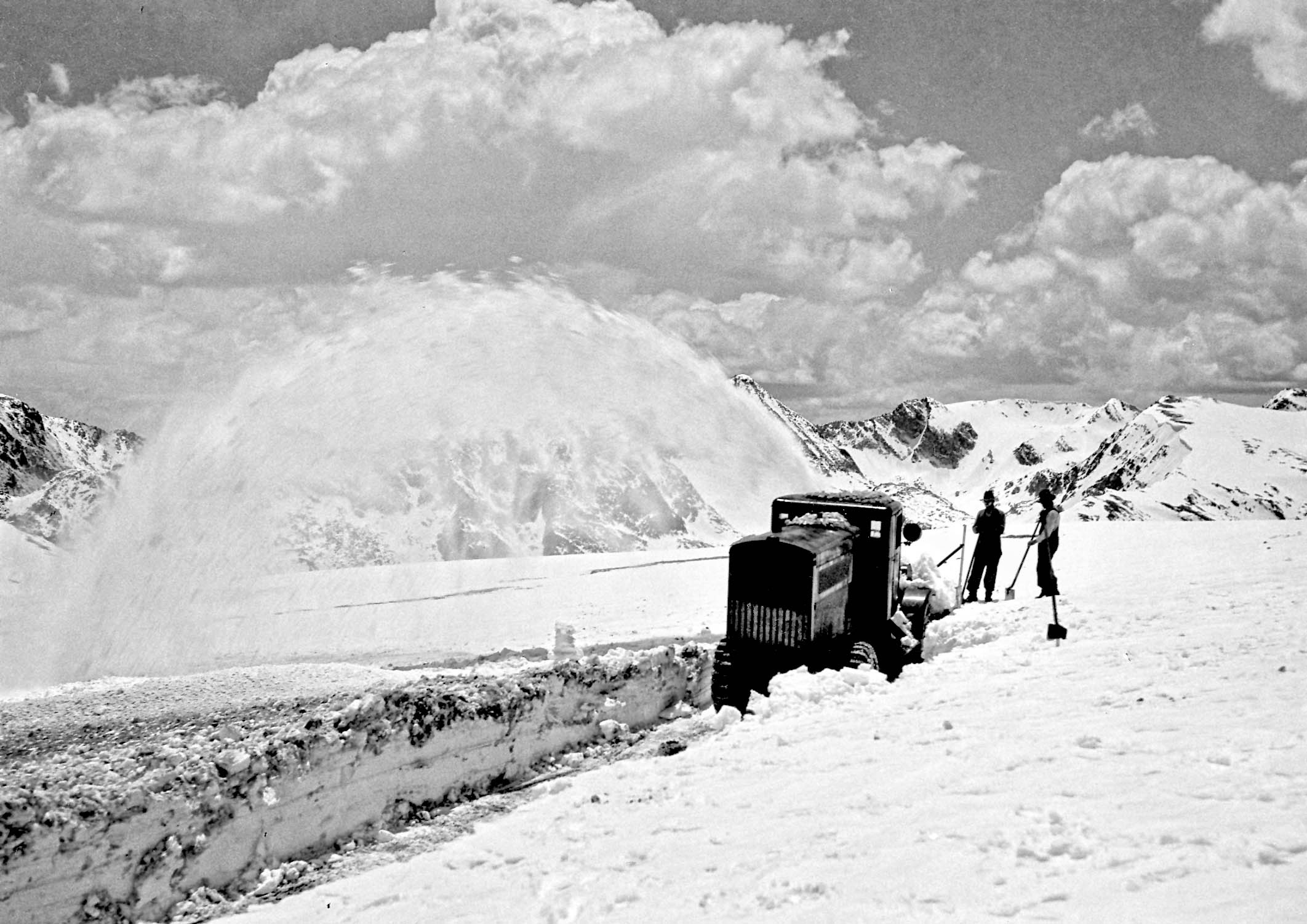
Snow blower in Rocky Mountain National Park, 1933

Robert Carr Harris of Maple Green, New Brunswick patented a "Railway Screw Snow Excavator" in 1870. In 1923, Robert E. Cole patented a snowplow that operated by using cutters and a fan to blow snow from a surface. Various other innovations also occurred. However, it is Arthur Sicard (1876–1946) who is generally credited as the inventor of the first practical snow blower. In 1925 Sicard completed his first prototype, based on a concept he described in 1894. He founded Sicard Industries in Sainte-Thérèse, Quebec and by 1927 his vehicles were in use removing snow from the roadways of the town of Outremont, now a borough of Montreal. His company is now a division of SMI-Snowblast, Inc. of Watertown, New York.

== Safety issues ==
The U.S. Consumer Product Safety Commission estimates that each year there are approximately 5,740 snowblower related injuries in the United States which require medical attention. One problem with the design of the snow blower is that snow can build up in the auger, jamming it and stalling the motor. This is complicated by the fact that the auger could deform before applying enough resistance to the motor to turn it off. If the jam is cleared by hand, it is possible for the auger to return to its natural shape suddenly and with great force, possibly injuring the operator. Snow blowers are a leading cause of traumatic hand and finger amputations. The correct procedure is to turn off the engine, disengage the clutch and then clear the jam with a broom handle or other long object. In an effort to improve safety, many manufacturers now include a plastic tool to be used to clear jams, often mounted directly to the snow blower.

Most modern machines mitigate this problem by including a dead man's switch to prevent the mechanism from rotating when the operator is not at the controls; these may be mandatory in some jurisdictions.

== Jet-engine snow blowers ==
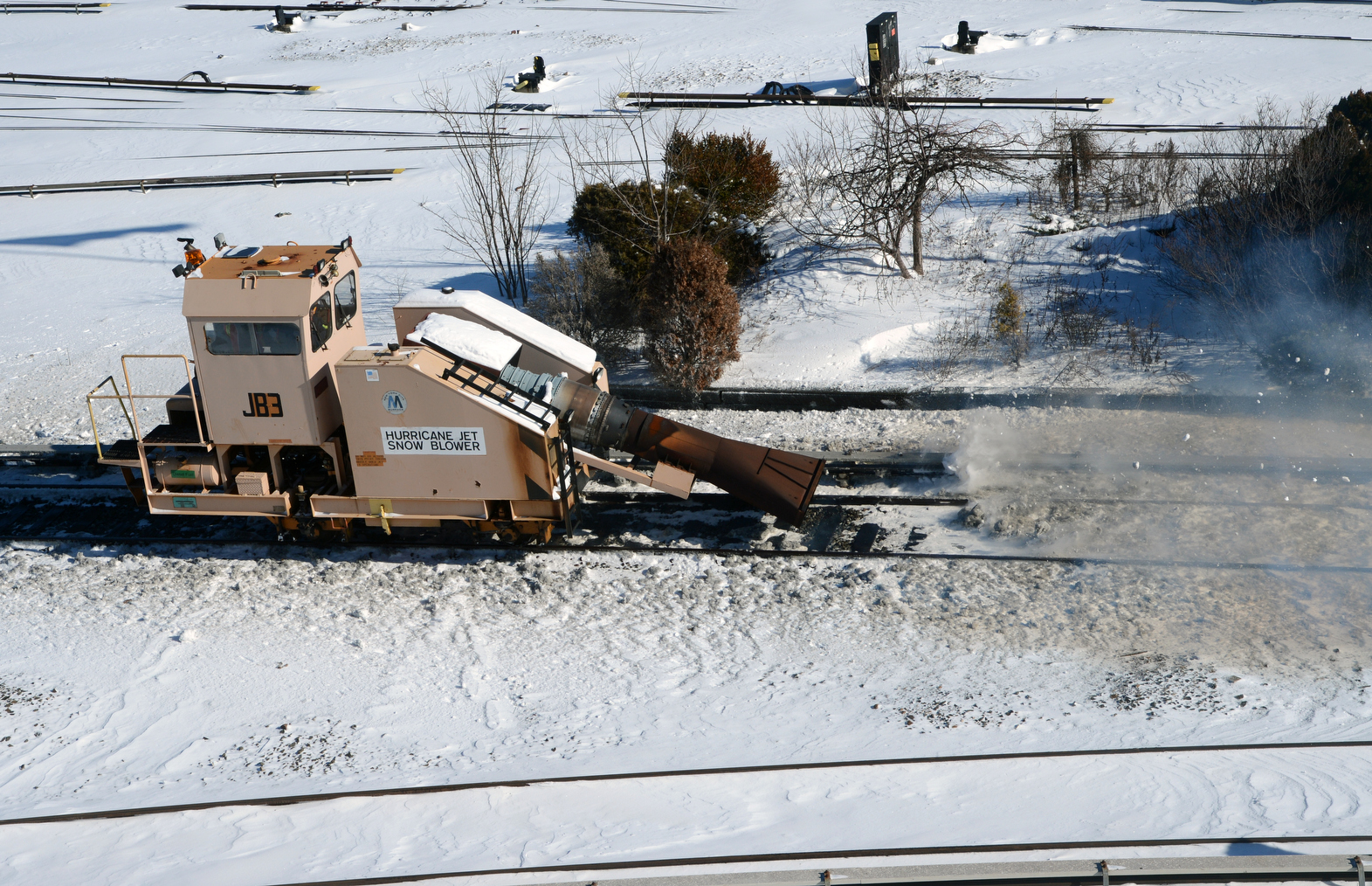
A jet-engine snow blower clearing a railway track at Coney Island Yard, New York, 2014

Jet engines and other gas turbines are used for large scale propelling and melting of snow over rails and roads. These blowers first were used in Russia and Canada in the 1960s, and were later introduced into the U.S. by the Boston Transportation Authority.

The jet engine both melts and blows the snow, clearing the tracks faster than other methods. While offering considerably greater power in a relatively lightweight machine, this method is much more expensive than traditional snow removing methods. In Russia, the high cost is partially offset by utilizing retired military jet engines, such as the Klimov VK-1.

== See also ==
- Small engine
- Snowplow
- Power shovel
