= The Toro Company =

American manufacturing company

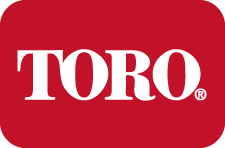

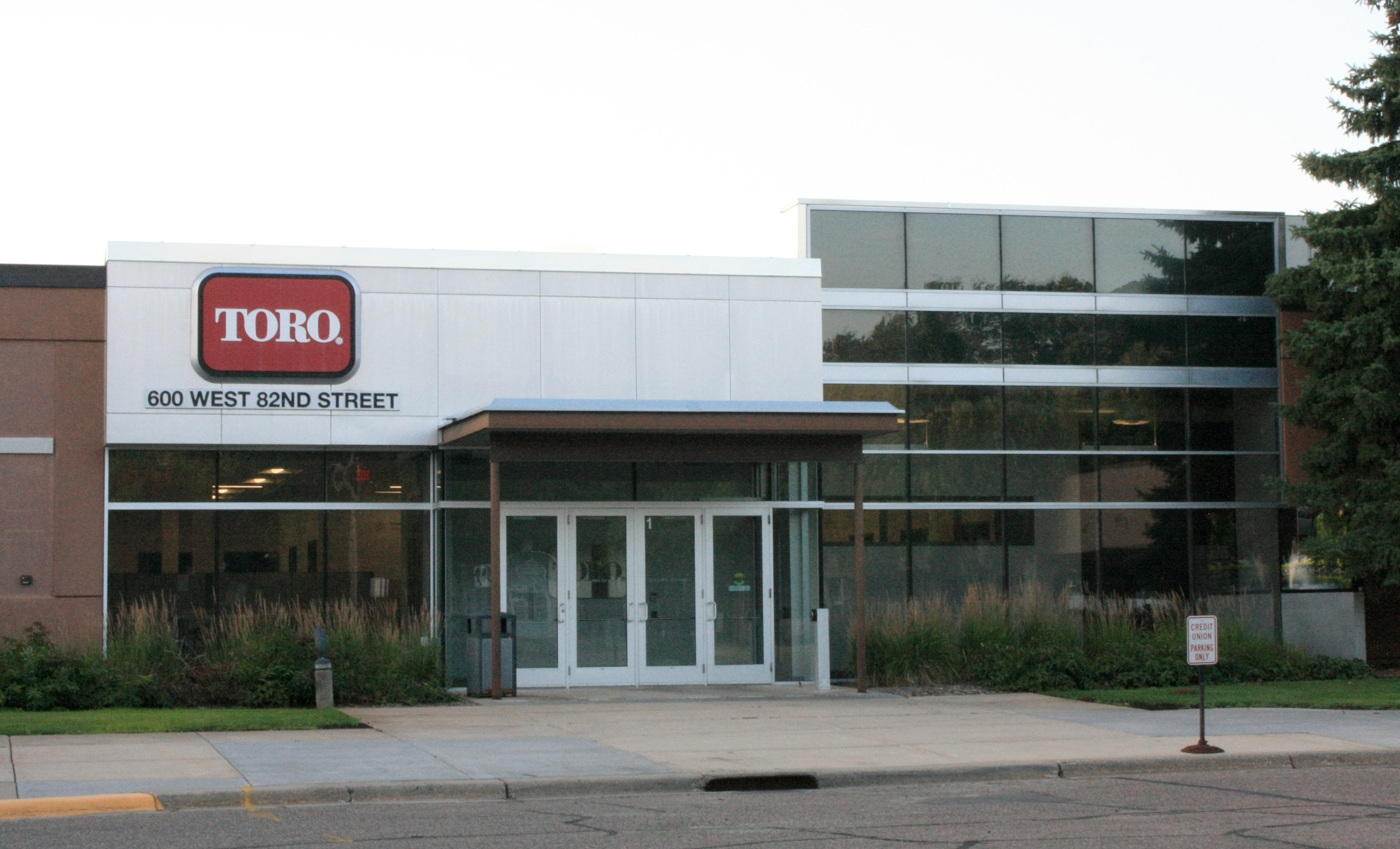
- Toro Headquarters in Bloomington, MN
- Type: Public company
- Traded as: NYSE: TTC; S&P 400 Component
- Industry: Irrigation supplies, landscape & turf maintenance products
- Founded: 1914
- Headquarters: Bloomington, Minnesota, U.S.
- Area served: Worldwide
- Key people: Edric Funk, CEO
- Products: Turf and landscape maintenance, snow and ice management, underground utility construction, rental and specialty construction, and irrigation and outdoor lighting solutions
- Revenue: ▲US$4.51 billion (2025)
- Number of employees: 9,800 (full-time)
- Website: thetorocompany.com

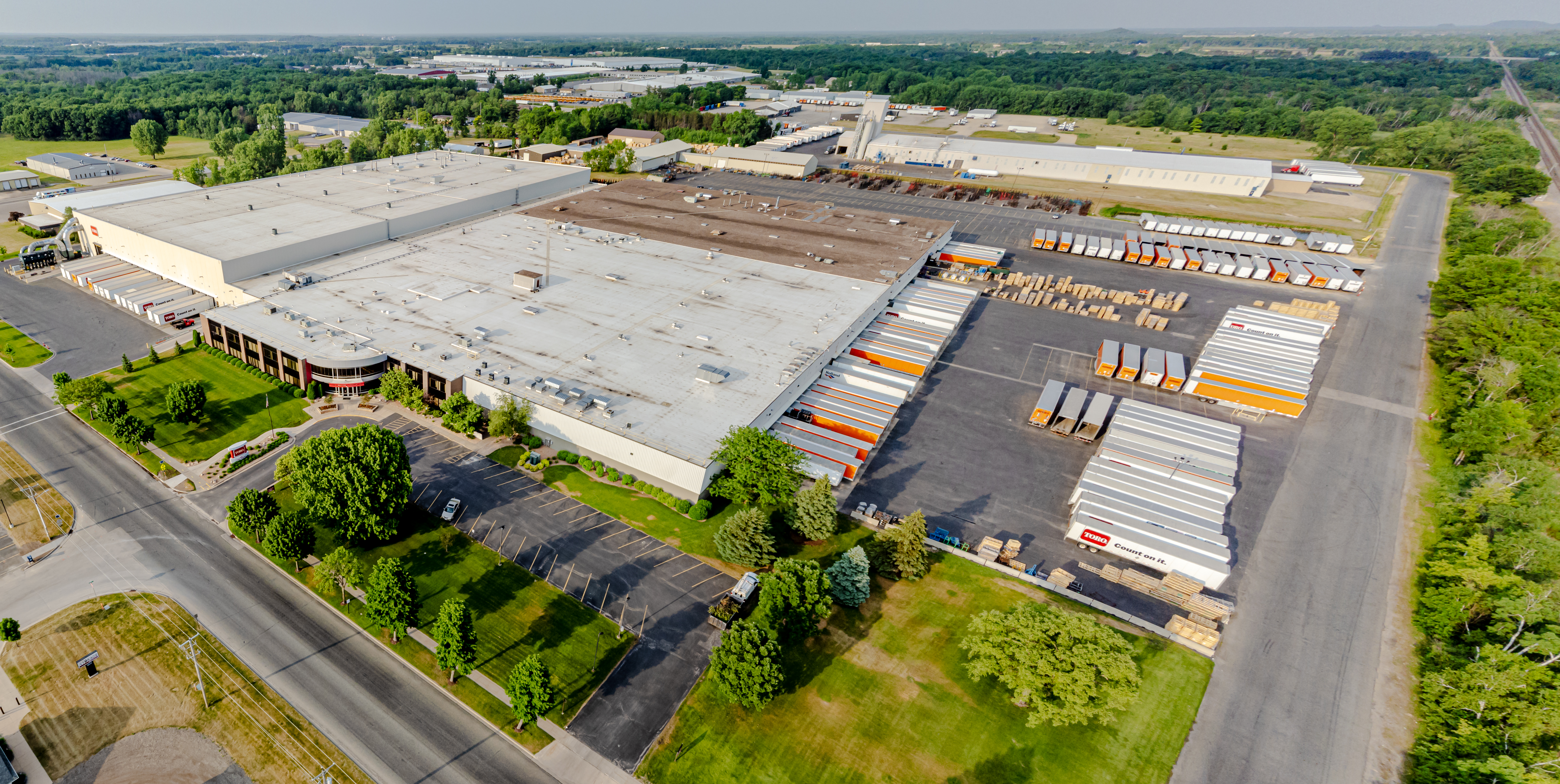
Toro plant in Tomah, Wisconsin

The Toro Company is an American company based in the Minneapolis suburb of Bloomington, Minnesota, that designs, manufactures, and markets lawn mowers, snow blowers, and irrigation system supplies for commercial and residential, agricultural, and public sector uses.

== History ==
=== Founding and early history ===
The Toro Company was established as the "Toro Motor Company" in 1914 to build tractor engines for The Bull Tractor Company, which at the time sold more tractors than any other brand. Following the decline of Bull Tractor in 1916, the company transitioned to build engines for the farm and truck industries, along with steam engines to support war efforts during World War I. Following the war, the company changed its name to Toro Manufacturing Company when it began to refocus on manufacturing farm equipment. In 1919, it introduced its first Toro-branded piece of equipment, the TO-RO farm tractor, and that same year was credited with manufacturing the first mechanical golf course maintenance equipment with the creation of a fairway mower utilizing five lawn mowers mounted onto the front of a Toro tractor. Toro began shipping golf course maintenance products worldwide by 1928, and released the first power mower for homeowners in 1935.

In the 1940s, Toro ceased production of commercial products to focus on manufacturing equipment for World War II. It also planned additional manufacturing space in anticipation of post-war production. In 1948, Toro acquired Whirlwind Corp. and introduced a bagging system to rotary mowers. It created its first snowblower in 1951, and in 1956 was the first lawn and garden manufacturer to advertise on television.

Toro purchased Moist-O-Matic, an irrigation equipment manufacturer, in 1962 and entered the underground irrigation business. The acquisition led to Toro's return to golf irrigation.

David M. Lilly served as chairman from 1968 until 1976, when President Gerald Ford appointed him to the Federal Reserve Board of Governors.

=== 1986 to 2019 ===
In 1986, Toro acquired the Wheel Horse, a division of American Motors Corporation (AMC). Wheel Horse manufactured lawn and garden tractors as well as riding lawn mowers. The division was spun off from AMC for $8 million so that the automaker could maintain focus on vehicles.

Over the years, lawn and garden tractors were then marketed under the Toro, Wheel Horse, and Toro Wheel Horse names. Toro continued to expand through acquisitions, purchasing Lawn-Boy in 1989 from Outboard Marine Corporation.

In the 1990s, then CEO Kendrick Melrose changed the company's strategy, shifting its focus to golf courses, sports fields, municipal parks, and commercial properties. Acquisitions include James Hardie Irrigation in 1996 and Exmark Manufacturing in 1997.

The company expanded its international and professional portfolio in the 2000s through acquisitions including Hayter (2005), Rain Master Irrigation Systems and Turf Guard Wireless Monitoring Technology (2007), Southern Green (2008), the TYCROP Manufacturing turf equipment product line (2009), and USPraxis (2010).

In 2007, almost 70 percent of the company's sales came from professional markets, versus a little more than one-third in 1990. Toro discontinued its Wheel Horse models and retired the brand name in 2007.

In 2014, The Toro Company acquired BOSS Snowplow, adding snow and ice management equipment to its portfolio.

On February 15, 2019, The Toro Company announced that it has reached an agreement to acquire privately held The Charles Machine Works for $700 million. Charles Machine Works was the parent company of Ditch Witch, American Augers, Hammerhead Trenchless, Subsite Electronics and other underground construction brands.

=== 2020 to present ===
In the years following the acquisition of Charles Machine Works, The Toro Company continued to diversify its portfolio through acquisitions in professional turf care, outdoor power equipment, and autonomous technologies. These included Venture Products, Inc. (2020), manufacturer of Ventrac compact tractors and attachments; Left Hand Robotics and Turflynx (2021), which strengthened the company's autonomous and robotic capabilities; and Intimidator Group (2022), manufacturer of Spartan Mowers.

The Toro Company further expanded its underground construction portfolio in the years following through acquisitions in 2025 including Tornado Infrastructure Equipment Ltd., a manufacturer of hydrovac excavation equipment, and ProKASRO Services USA, the market leader of robotic solutions and rehabilitation equipment for repairing underground water and wastewater infrastructure.

By the mid-2020s, The Toro Company portfolio spanned professional turf maintenance equipment, turf and agricultural irrigation systems, landscape and lighting products, snow and ice management equipment, rental, specialty, and underground construction equipment, and residential yard and snow products.

== Brands ==
The company's products are marketed under several brands:

- Toro – Manufacturer of turf maintenance, snow and ice management, irrigation and specialty equipment for homeowners, golf courses, sports fields, parks, commercial properties and agriculture
- Boss Snowplow – A recognized leader in the snow and ice management industry, offering a broad lineup of plows for trucks, UTVs, and ATVs, salt and sand spreaders, liquid deicing equipment, and sidewalk vehicles with a full range of attachments.
- Ditch Witch – Designs, manufactures and markets a complete line of directional drills, vacuum excavators, trenchers, vibratory plows, mini-skid steers and fluid systems for the underground utility construction industry.
- Radius – Provides professional tools for horizontal directional drilling equipment.
- American Augers – Underground construction equipment including large horizontal directional drills, pumps and fluid cleaning systems.
- Subsite – Provides guidance equipment, utility locators, and utility inspection systems for underground construction professionals.
- HammerHead Trenchless – Trenchless construction equipment and robotic solutions for the inspection, rehabilitation and replacement of water, wastewater and stormwater pipelines.

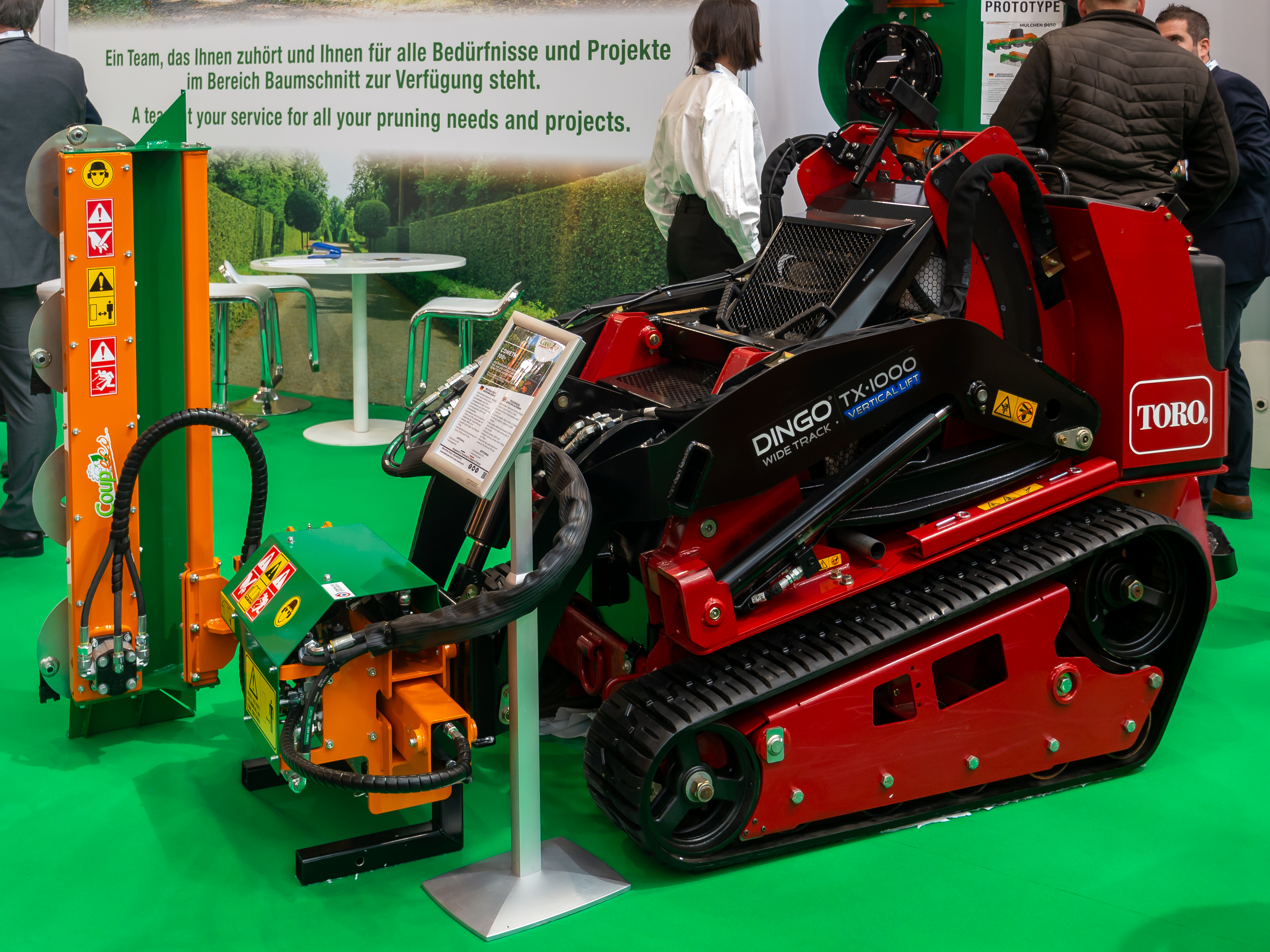
Dingo Wide Track

- eXmark – Manufacturer of commercial turf care equipment, specializing in zero-turn, stand-on, and walk-behind mowers for landscape professionals and homeowners.
- Hayter (United Kingdom) – British manufacturer of lawn care products for homeowners and professionals in the United Kingdom.
- Spartan Mowers – Designs and manufactures zero-turn and stand-on mowers, and side-by-side utility vehicles for large acreage and professional customers.
- Irritrol Systems – Professional irrigation products for residential and commercial applications.
- Lawn-Boy – Residential lawn mowers
- Perrot – Based in Germany, Perrot manufactures irrigation products for sports fields, agricultural fields and industrial applications.

- Tornado Infrastructure Equipment - Manufacturer of hydrovac excavation solutions for the underground construction, power transmission and energy markets.
- Unique Lighting – Low-voltage outdoor lighting including fixtures, transformers, high-efficiency LED lamps, wireless controls and accessories for residential and commercial customers.
- Ventrac - Manufacturer of articulating turf, landscape, and snow and ice management equipment for grounds, landscape contractor, golf, municipal and rural acreage customers.
