= Boeing B-29 Superfortress variants =

US heavy bomber aircraft

B-29 Superfortress
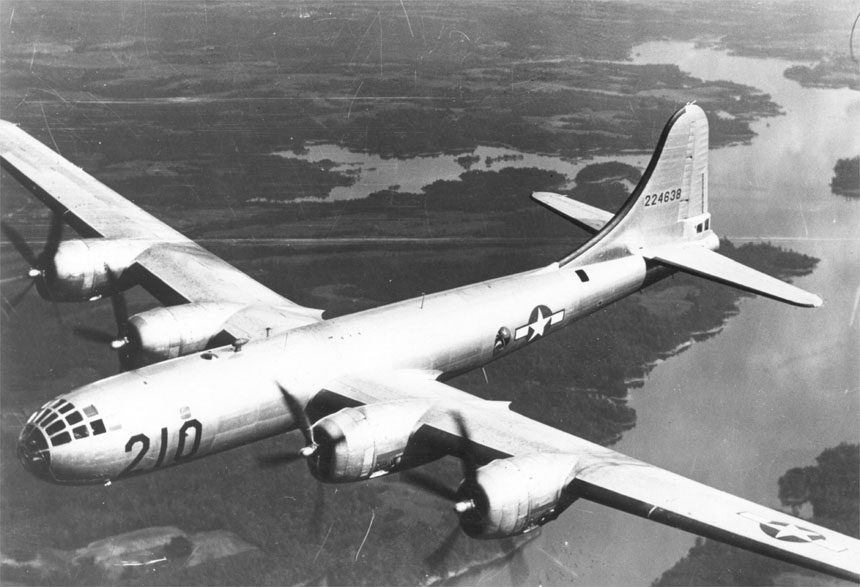
- Boeing B-29 assigned to B-29 Transition Training School, Maxwell Field, Alabama

General information
- Type: Strategic bomber
- Manufacturer: Boeing
- Status: Retired (see Surviving aircraft)
- Primary users: United States Army Air Forces United States Air Force; Royal Air Force
- Number built: 3,960

History
- Manufactured: 1943–1946
- Introduction date: 8 May 1944
- First flight: 21 September 1942
- Retired: 21 June 1960
- Variants: All models Boeing KB-29 Superfortress; XB-39 Superfortress; Boeing XB-44 Superfortress; Boeing B-50 Superfortress
- Developed into: Boeing 377 Stratocruiser; Tupolev Tu-4

The Boeing B-29 Superfortress is a United States Army Air Forces long range, strategic heavy bomber that was produced in many experimental and production models from 1943 to 1946.

== XB-29 ==
Section source: Baugher

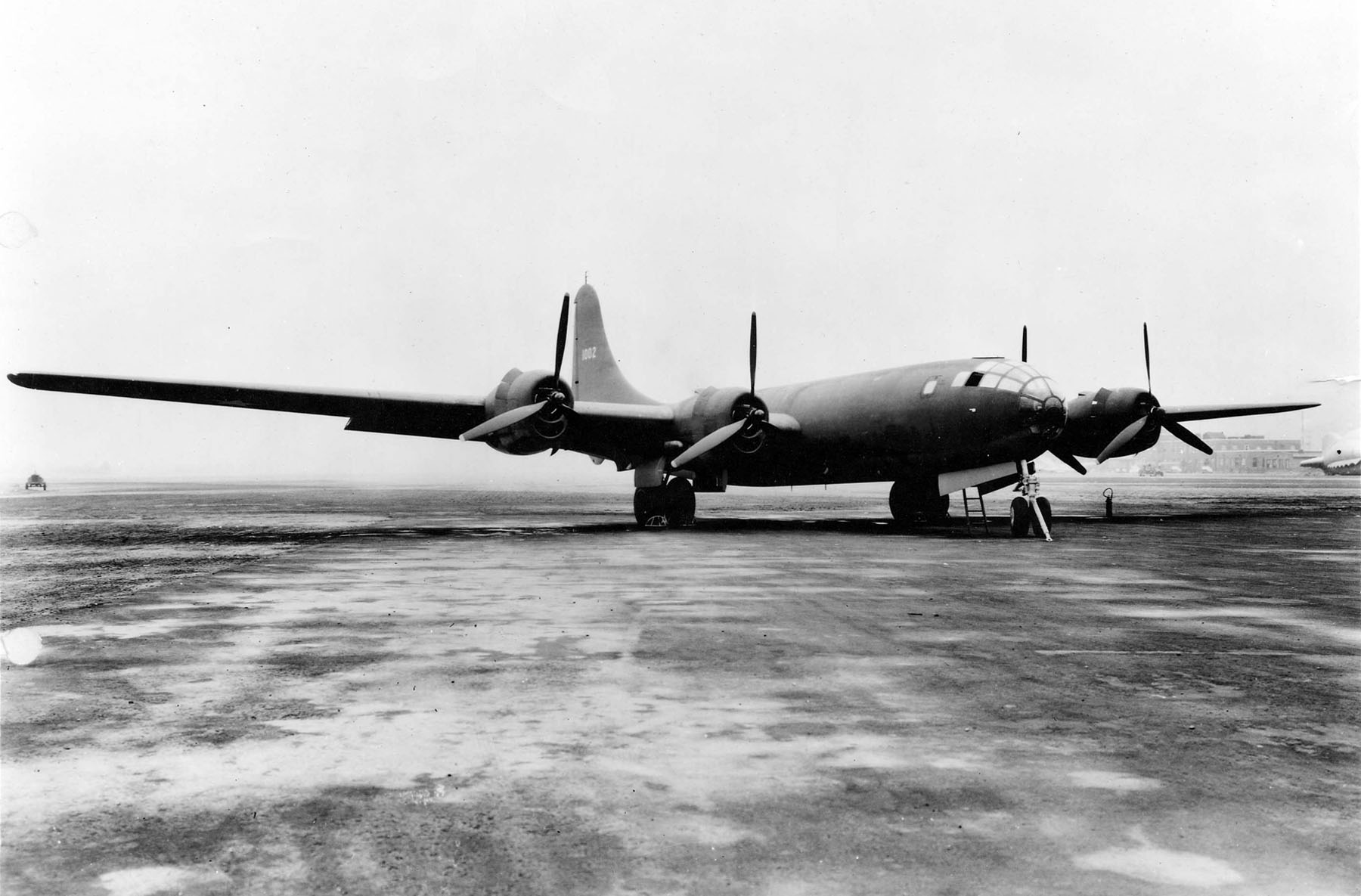
Boeing XB-29-BO (S/N 41-002, the first XB-29 built)

The XB-29, Boeing Model 345, was the first accepted prototype or experimental model delivered to the Army Air Corps, incorporating a number of improvements on the design originally submitted, including more and larger guns and self-sealing fuel tanks. Two aircraft were ordered in August 1940, and a third was ordered in December. A mockup was completed in the spring of 1941, and it first flew on September 21, 1942.

Testing was conducted on the XB-29 until February 18, 1943, when the second prototype crashed. The flight was conducted by Boeing's chief test pilot, Edmund T. "Eddie" Allen on a two-hour powerplant performance test. The accident happened when leaking fuel from a filler cap in the wing leading edge ran down inside the leading-edge and ignited. The fire spread to the engines, and due to the much reduced power, the aircraft, unable to climb, crashed into the Frye meat-packing plant. The crash demolished the majority of the packing plant and killed all eleven XB-29 crew, 22 employees at the plant, and one fireman. Many leading Boeing personnel involved in the design perished in the accident; the pilot, Allen, was chief of the Research Division. After the crash, the United States Army Air Forces and a congressional committee headed by then-Senator Harry S. Truman investigated the B-29 program, issuing a scathing report, prompting the Army Air Forces to take control of the program.

== YB-29 ==
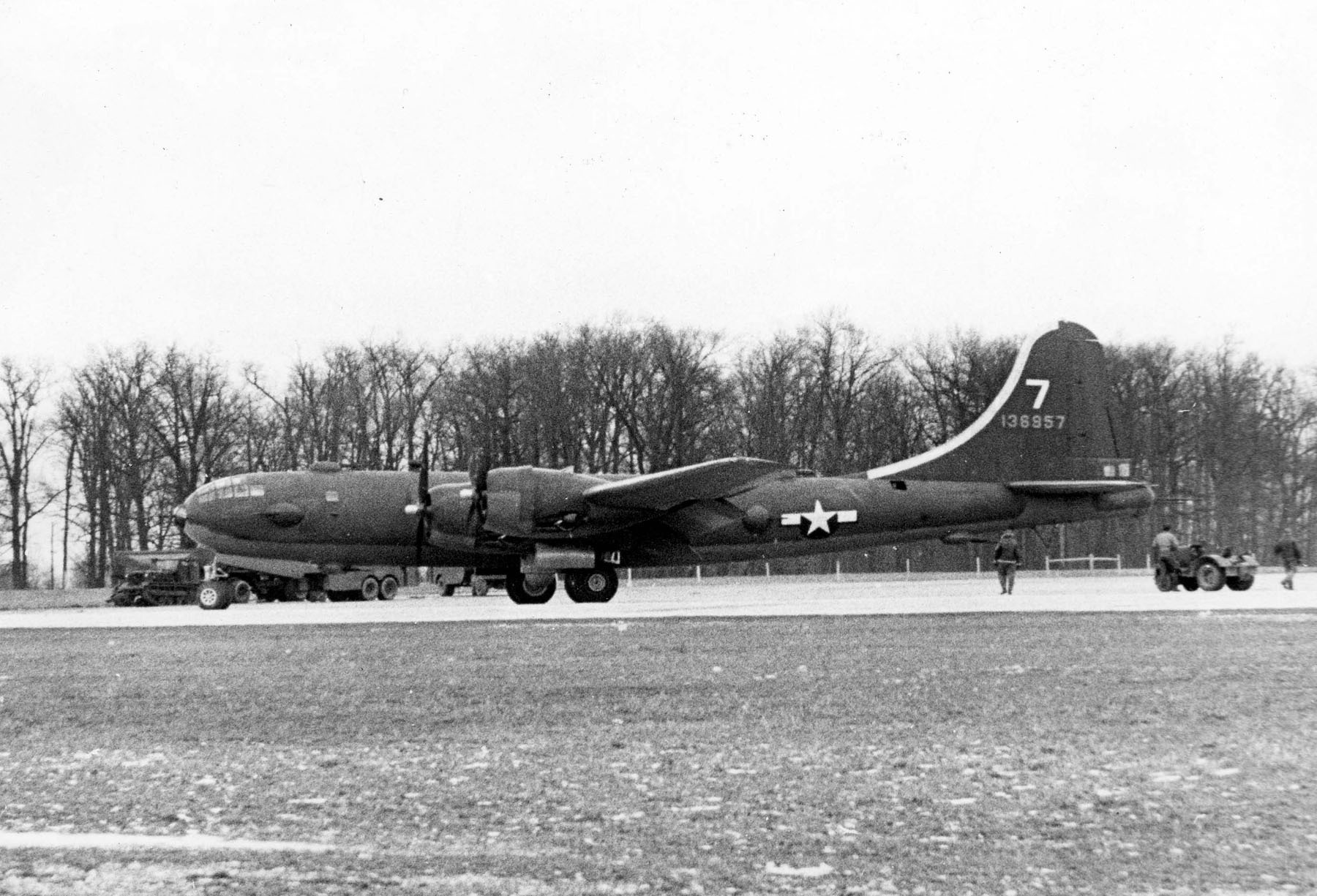
Boeing YB-29-BO (S/N 41-36957). Note the nose has an Erco ball turret with twin .50-cal. machine guns, and the fuselage package guns just below and aft of the cockpit have twin .50-cal. machine guns mounted.

The YB-29 was an improved XB-29 and 14 were built for service testing. Testing began in the summer of 1943, and dozens of modifications were made to the planes. The engines were upgraded from Wright R-3350-13s to R-3350-21s. Where the XB-29 had three-bladed props, the YB-29 had four-bladed propellers. Various alternatives to the remote-controlled defensive systems were tested on a number of them, particularly the fourth one delivered. After alternative arrangements had been fully tested, defensive armament was standardised at ten .50-calibre machine guns in turret-mounted pairs. The YB-29 also featured a better fire control system.

== B-29 ==
The B-29 was the original production version of the Superfortress. Since the new bomber was urgently needed, the production design was developed in tandem with the service testing. In fact, the first B-29 was completed only two months after the delivery of the first YB-29. Forty-six B-29s of this variant, built by the Glenn L. Martin Company at its Omaha plant, were used as the aircraft for the atomic bomb missions, modified to Silverplate specifications.

Some 2,513 B-29s were manufactured by Boeing-Wichita (1,620), Bell-Atlanta (357), and Martin-Omaha (536).

== B-29A ==
Section source: Baugher

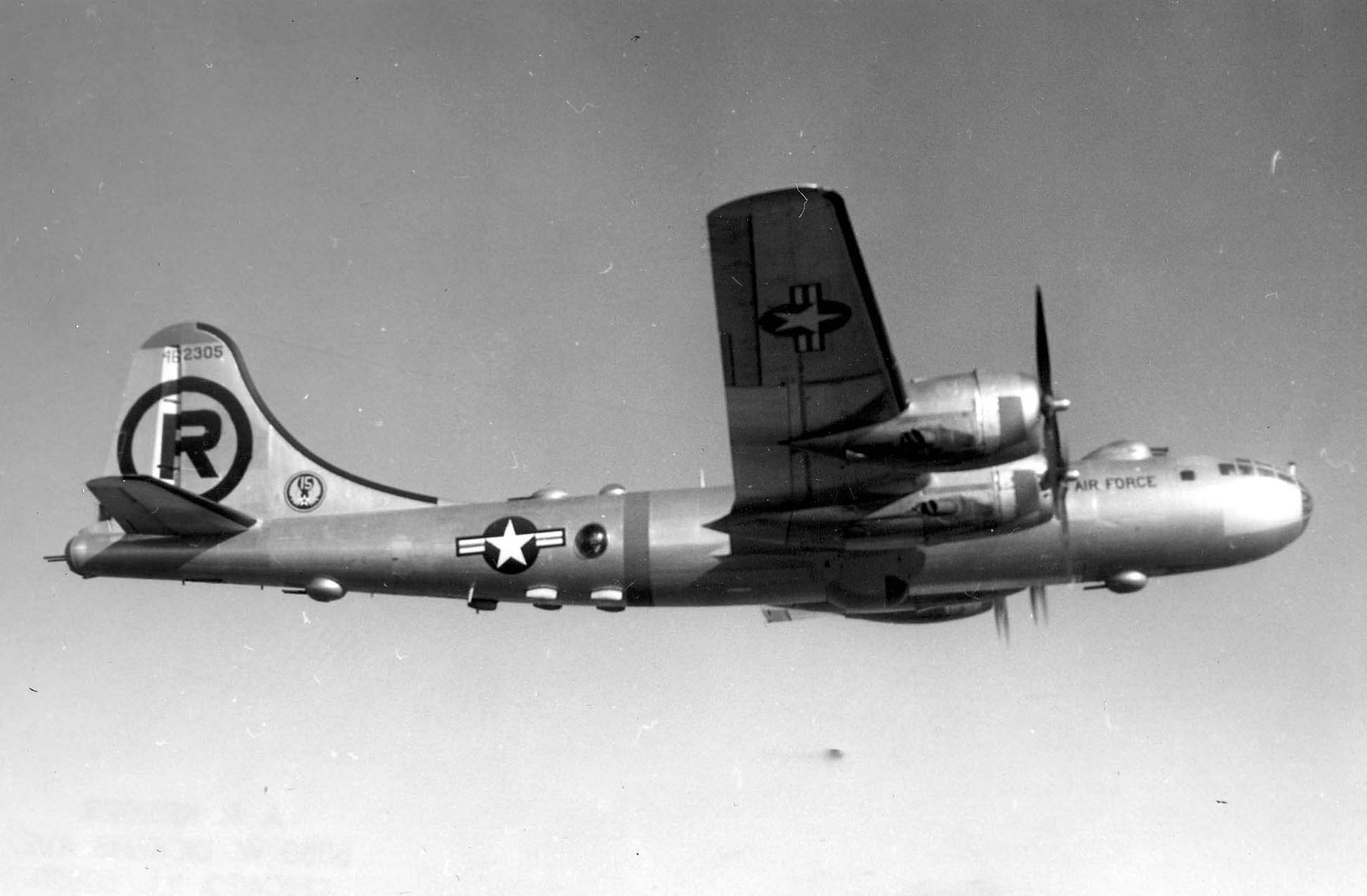
Boeing B-29A-70-BN (S/N 44-62305). Note the streamlined top turret added on block 40 A models and later.

The B-29A was an improved version of the original B-29 production model. This is the definitive wartime variant of the B-29. All 1,119 B-29A's were built at the Boeing plant in Renton, Washington, formerly used by the United States Navy.

Enhancements made in the B-29A included a better wing design and defensive modifications. Due to a demonstrated weakness to head-on fighter attacks, the number of machine guns in the forward dorsal turrets was doubled to four beginning with production block 20. Where the wings of previous models had been made by the sub-assembly of two sections, the B-29A wing was built up from three. This made construction easier, and increased the strength of the airframe. The B-29A was produced until May 1946, when the last aircraft was completed. It was employed up to, and through, the Korean War, after which it was then quickly phased out when the B-47 Stratojet became operational.

Washington B Mk 1 – This was the service name given to 88 B-29As supplied to the Royal Air Force.

== B-29B ==
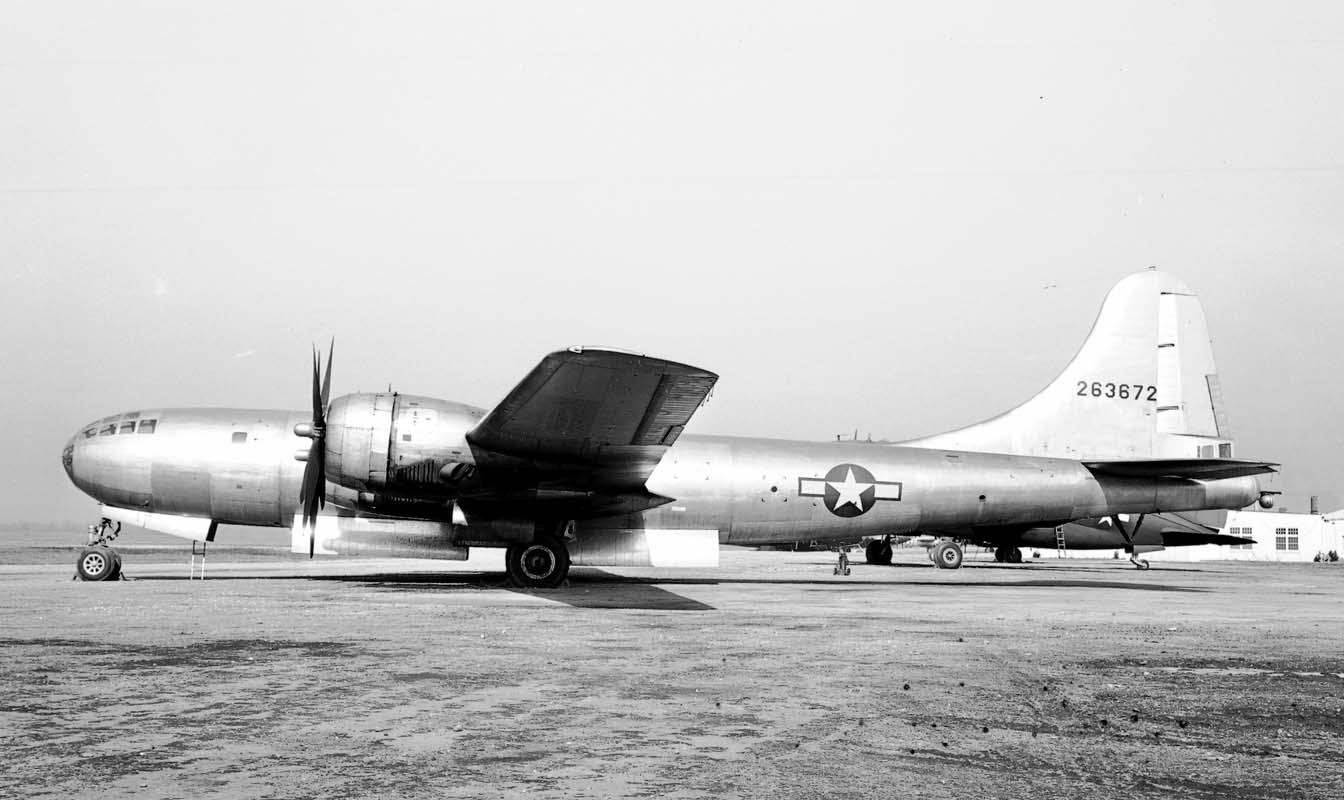
Boeing B-29B-35-BA (S/N 42-63672)

Section source: Baugher's Encyclopedia & National Museum of the USAF

The B-29B was a modification used for low-level raids, designed with the intent of firebombing Japan. Since fighter opposition was minimal over Japan in late 1944, many of the Army Air Force leadership — most notably Curtis LeMay, commander of the XXI Bomber Command — felt that a (lighter) faster bomber would better evade Japanese flak.

In the B-29B, as with the atomic raid-dedicated Silverplate versions earlier, all defensive armament was removed except for that in the tail turret. Initially the armament was two .50 in AN/M2 machine guns and one 20 mm M2 cannon which was soon changed to three .50 in AN/M2s. The weight saved by removing the guns increased the top speed from 357 mph to 364 mph (575 km/h to 586 km/h).

Also incorporated on this version was an improved APQ-7 "Eagle" bombing-through-overcast radar that was fitted in an airfoil-shaped radome under the fuselage.

All 311 B-29Bs were built at the Bell plant in Marietta, Georgia ("Bell-Atlanta").

== B-29C ==
The B-29C was a modification of the B-29A re-engined with improved Wright R-3350 Duplex-Cyclone engines. The Army Air Force originally ordered 5,000, but cancelled its request when World War II ended and none were built.

== B-29D (XB-44) ==
Section source: Baugher

The B-29D was an improved version of the original B-29 design, featuring 28-cylinder Pratt & Whitney R-4360-35 Wasp Major engines of 3500 hp (2600 kW) each — nearly 60% more powerful than the usual Duplex-Cyclone. It also had a taller vertical stabilizer and a strengthened wing. The XB-44 was the testbed designation for the D model.

When World War II ended, the B-29D was given the quartet of Wasp Major engines to become the B-50, which served throughout the 1950s in the U.S. bomber fleet.

== Test beds ==
A number of B-29s were converted to serve as test beds for new systems. These all received variant designation, even though many existed only as a single converted aircraft.

=== XB-29E ===
The XB-29E for fire-control systems (one converted) was a model B-29-45-BW.

=== XB-29F ===
The B-29F for cold-weather operation in Alaska were six converted B-29-BWs.

=== XB-29G ===
The B-29 was used in the development of jet engines. Stripped of armament, a converted B-29B-55-BA (44–84043)(Bell) designated the XB-29G carried experimental jet engines in its bomb bay, which were extended into the airstream for testing during flight. This plane was used to test the Allison J35, General Electric J47 and J73 jet engines.

=== XB-29H ===
The XB-29H to test armament configurations was a converted B-29A.

=== YB-29J, YKB-29J, RB-29J ===
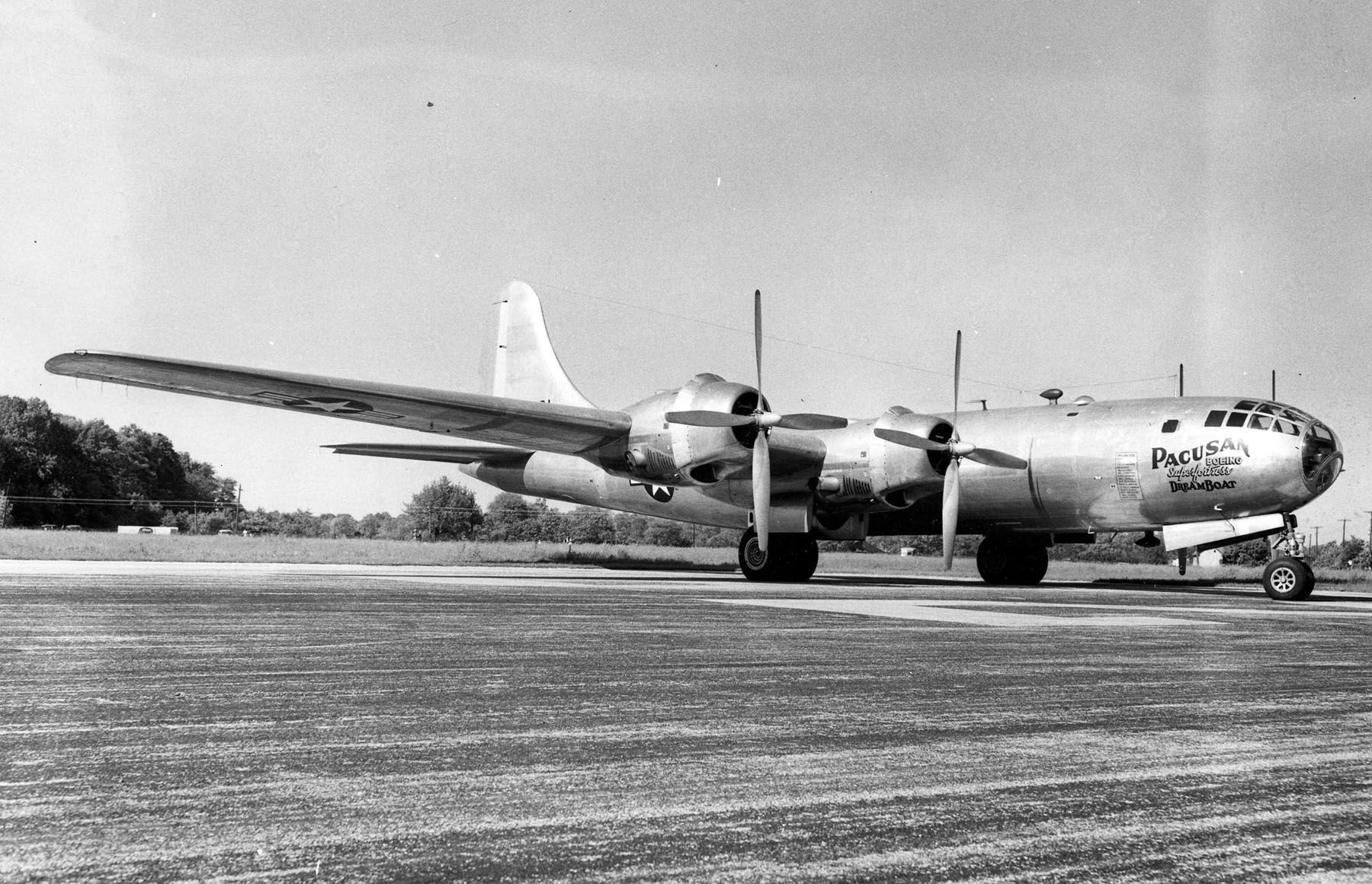
Boeing YB-29J (S/N 44-84061) "Pacusan Dreamboat"

Experimentation in piston engines continued. Six B-29s (redesignated YB-29J) of various designation were upgraded to R-3350-79 engines. Other engine-associated items were also upgraded, including new Curtiss propellers, and 'Andy Gump' cowlings, in which the oil coolers have separate air intakes. Two were later converted to aerial refueling tanker prototypes, and redesignated YKB-29J. The remainder were used for reconnaissance, and designated RB-29J.

== EB-29 ==
Section source: Baugher

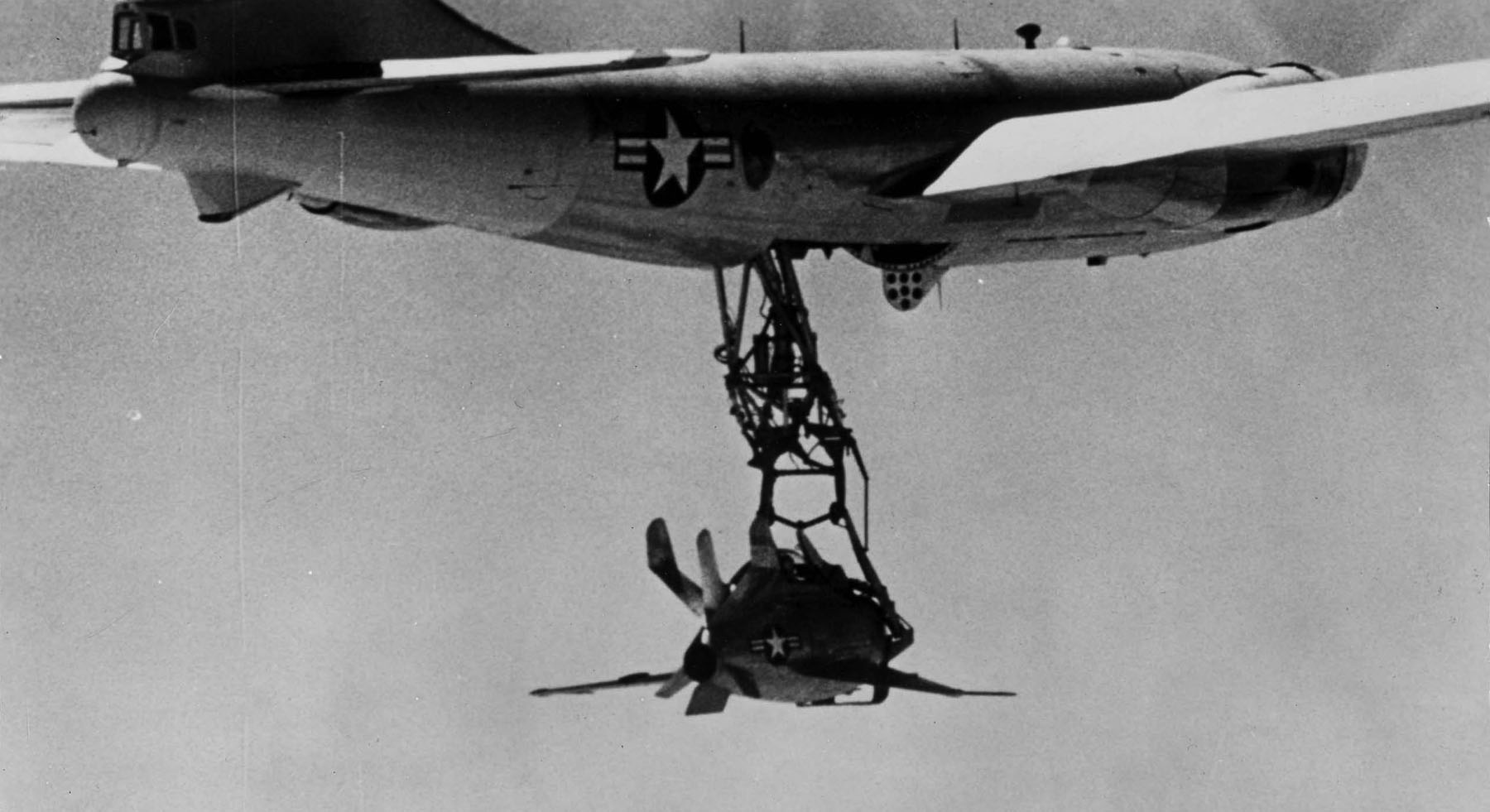
McDonnell XF-85 Goblin and EB-29 mothership.

The EB-29 (E stands for exempt), was used as a carrier aircraft in which the bomb bay was modified to accept and launch experimental aircraft. They were converted in the years following World War II. One EB-29 was converted to carry the famous Bell X-1 until it was replaced by a B-50. Another was used to carry and test the XF-85 'parasite fighter'. This fighter was intended to be carried by the Convair B-36 on long-range missions to protect it from Soviet fighters. Another EB-29 was used to carry two EF-84B Thunderjet fighters as part of Project Tom-Tom. All three Tom-Tom aircraft (the B-29 and the two jet fighters) and their crews were lost in a crash on April 24, 1953.

== RB-29J (RB-29, FB-29J, F-13, F-13A) ==
Section source: see Baugher

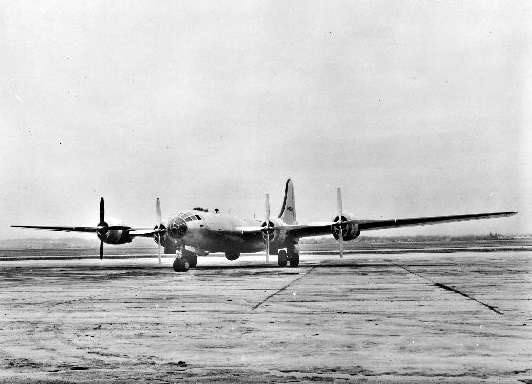
An F-13 Superfortress

Early B-29/B-29As that were modified for photo reconnaissance carried the F-13/F-13A designations, with "F" meaning 'photo'. The aircraft (118 modified B-29BWs and B-29As) carried three K-17B, two K-22 and one K-18 cameras. Between the end of World War II (1945) and 1948 the designation was changed to FB-29J. In 1948, the F-13/FB-29s were redesignated RB-29 and RB-29A.

Six B-29A/F-13As were modified with the Wright R-3350-CA-2 fuel injected engines and designated at YB-29Js. These were then converted to RB-29Js.

In January 1949, RB-29s were assigned to the 91st Strategic Reconnaissance Wing and moved to Yokota AB, Japan in December 1950; to provide support to the Korean War and attached to the 15th Air Force, Far East Air Force.

== SB-29 ==
Section source: Birdsall

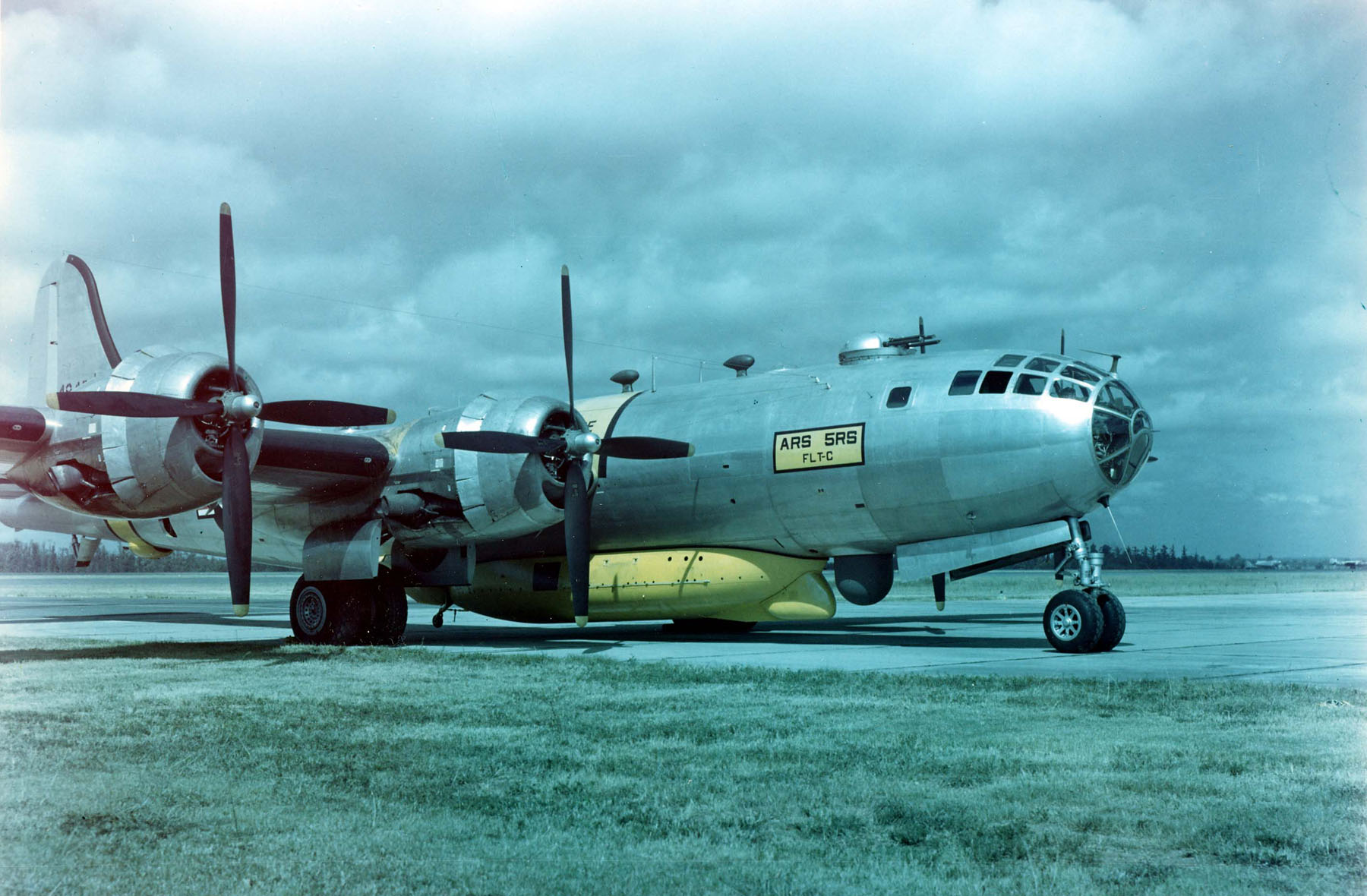
SB-29

The SB-29 'Super Dumbo' was a version of the B-29 adapted for air-sea rescue duty after World War II. Sixteen B-29s were modified to carry a droppable A-3 lifeboat under the fuselage; redesignated SB-29, they were used mainly as rescue support for air units that flew long distances over water. The first SB-29s were received by the Air Rescue Service in February 1947. With the exception of the forward lower gun turret, all defensive armament was retained; the aircraft additionally carried a variety of radio equipment, provisions, survival kits, and extra crew. The SB-29 was used operationally throughout the Korean War into the mid-1950s. It received its nickname from Dumbo, the Disney character, whose name was given to the aircraft used in previous missions to pick airmen up when they crashed at sea.

== TB-29 ==
The TB-29 was a trainer conversion of B-29 used to train crew for bombing missions; some were also used to tow targets, and the designation included B-29s modified solely for that purpose. Their most important role was serving as radar targets in the 1950s when the United States Air Force was developing intercept tactics for its fighters.

== WB-29 ==
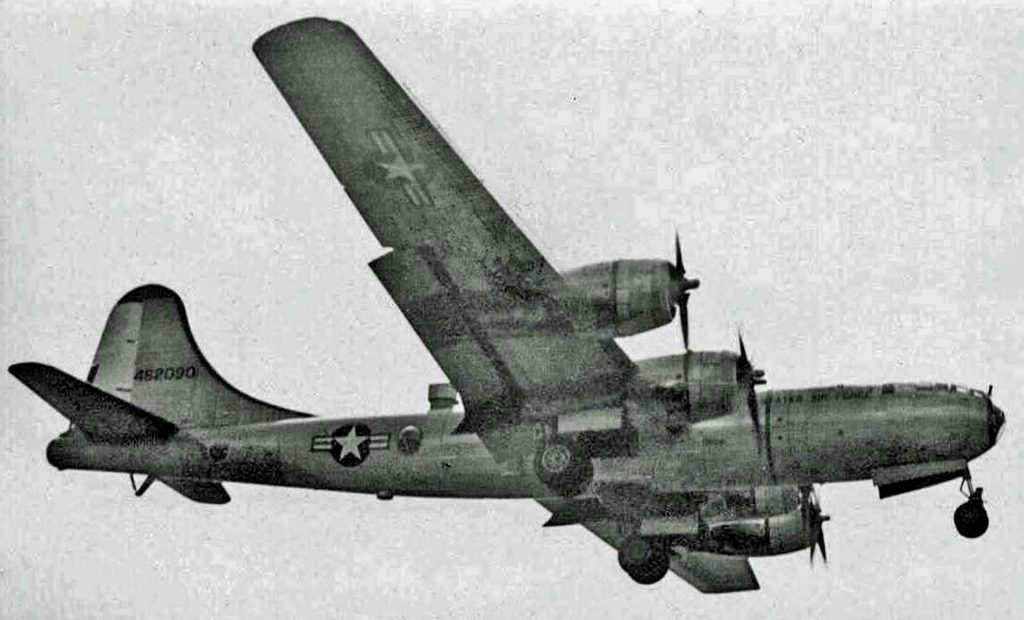
Boeing WB-29A of the 53d Weather Reconnaissance Squadron in 1954

The WB-29s were production aircraft modified to perform weather monitoring missions. An observation position was fitted above the central fuselage section. They conducted standard data-gathering flights, including from the UK over the Atlantic. They were also used to fly into the eye of a hurricane or typhoon to gather information. Following nuclear weapons tests, some WB-29s used air sampling scoops to test radiation levels. On 3 September 1949, a WB-29 returning from Yokota AB, Japan, to Eielson AFB, Alaska, recovered radioactive debris in air sampling scoops from the cloud generated by the first atomic bomb test by the Soviet Union on 29 August.

== Airborne Early Warning ==
In 1951, three B-29s were modified for use in the Airborne Early Warning program. The upper section of the forward fuselage was extensively modified to house an AN/APS-20C search radar, and the interior was modified to house radar and Electronic Counter Measures (ECM) equipment. This development led to production radar picket aircraft, including the EC-121 Warning Star. (×3, converted)

A Soviet-built copy of the B-29, the Tu-4, was used as the platform for a Chinese experimental airborne early warning aircraft, the KJ-1 AEWC, in the 1970s.

== MX-767 Banshee ==
A study for the conversion of B-29s to long-range cruise missiles was conducted by the Air Materiel Command between 1946 and 1950; given the designation MX-767, it was given the codename Project Banshee. Flight tests were conducted, however no full conversions were carried out before the project was abandoned.

== Navy P2B patrol bomber ==
Section source: Baugher

The U.S. Navy acquired four B-29-BWs from the U.S. Army Air Forces on March 14, 1947. These aircraft were modified for long-range patrol missions and given the designation P2B-1S with Navy Bureau Numbers (BuNo) 84028, 84029, 84030 and 84031.

BuNo 84029, previously AAF Ser. No. 45-21787, was modified to carry the Navy's Douglas D-558-2 Skyrocket high-speed research aircraft. The bomb bay was modified to carry the Skyrocket II under the belly and drop for supersonic speed testing. The first Skyrocket test flight occurred on September 8, 1950, with test pilot William B. Bridgeman, and George Jansen flying the B-29. Scott Crossfield later broke Mach 2 flying the Skyrocket on November 20, 1953; the last Skyrocket flight was in December 1956.

The P2B-1S "mother-ship" was nicknamed Fertile Myrtle and was assigned the NACA number 137. As of May 2013, this aircraft was in the collection of Kermit Weeks at his Fantasy of Flight aviation museum in Polk City, Florida. The forward fuselage section was restored and briefly displayed at the Florida Air Museum in Lakeland, Florida. It has since been relocated to Fantasy of Flight's "Golden Hill" storage facility along with the remainder of the disassembled aircraft, awaiting future restoration to flyable status.

BuNo 84030 and 84031 were later modified into anti-submarine patrol bombers and redesignated P2B-2S.

== XB-39 Superfortress ==
Section source: see Baugher

The XB-39 Superfortress was a single YB-29 modified to use water-cooled Allison V-3420-17 Vee type engines. Since the Army Air Force was concerned that problems might develop with their first choice of engine, the Wright R-3350, they contracted General Motors to test a modified aircraft to show that it could still be used if the R-3350 development was not successful. Since the R-3350 did not have significant enough problems to prevent its use, no XB-39s were ordered.

== Tupolev Tu-4 ==
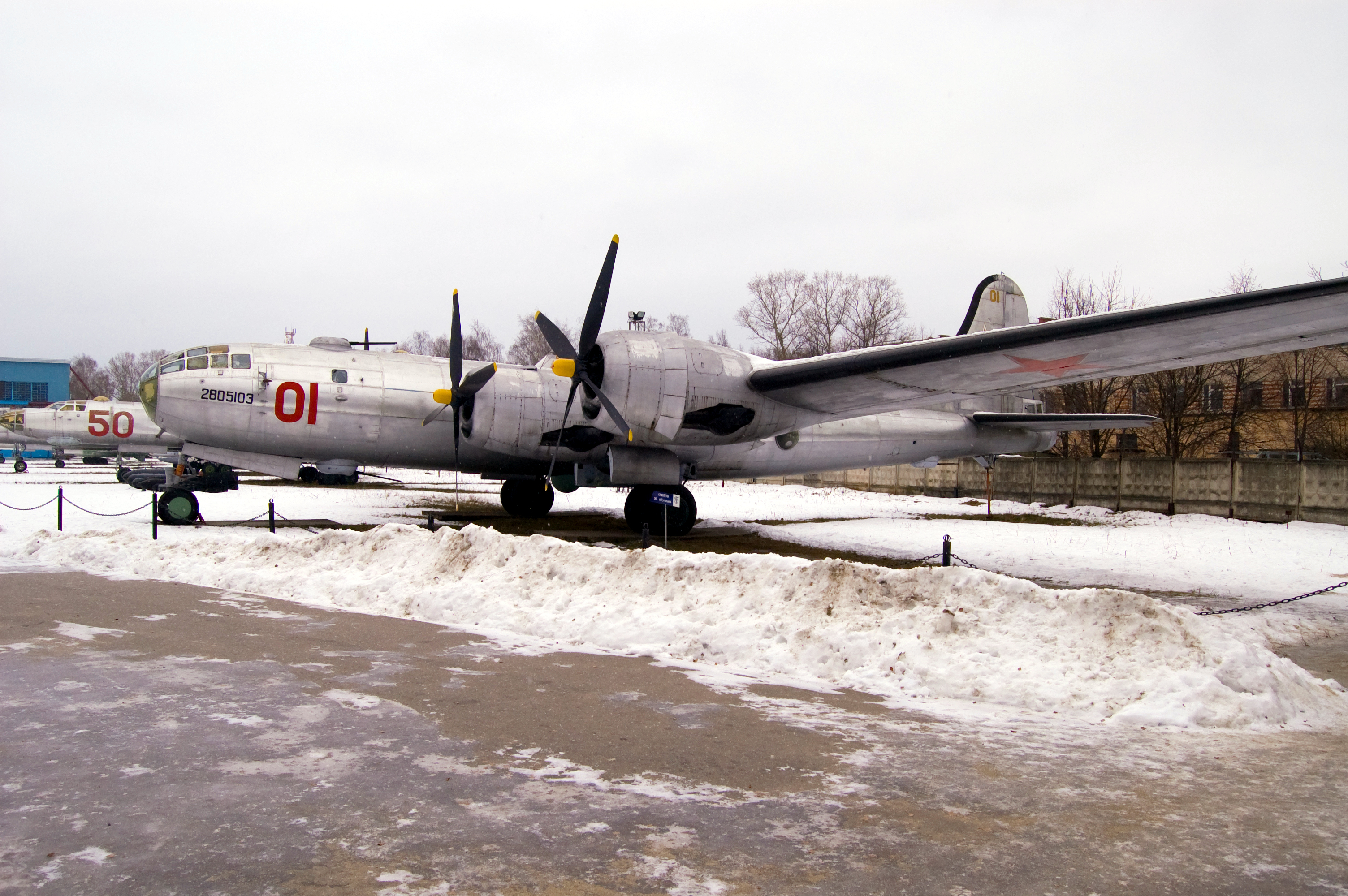
Tupolev Tu-4 at Monino

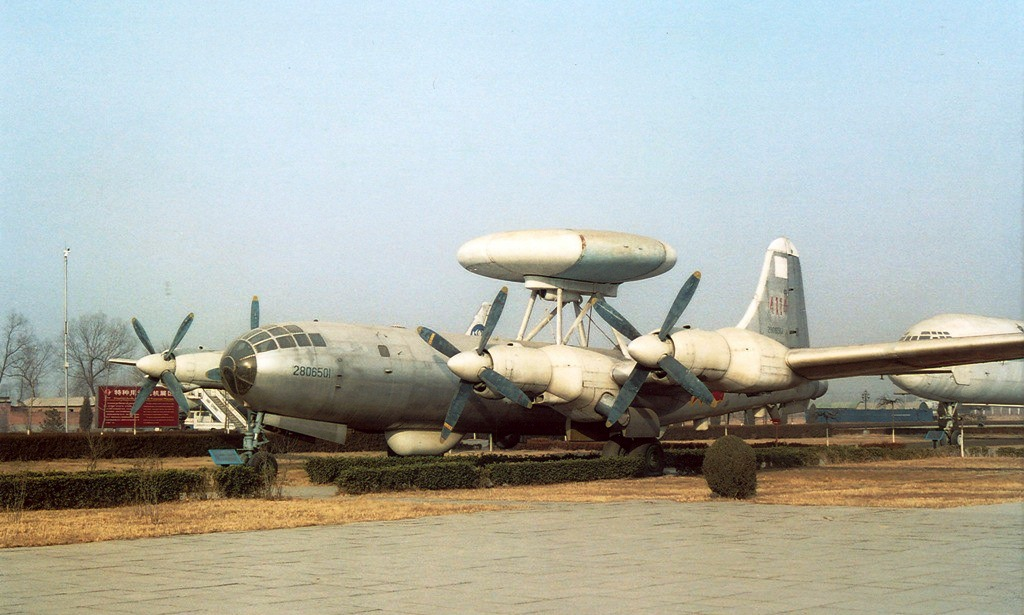
KJ-1 at the China Aviation Museum

In 1945, three B-29s were forced to land in Soviet territory after a bombing raid on Japan because of lack of fuel. Since the Soviet Union was not at war with Japan at the time, the aircraft and crew were interned. Eventually, the B-29 crew members were returned, but the aircraft remained in Russian hands. Seeking a modern long-range bomber, Joseph Stalin ordered the Tupolev OKB to reverse-engineer the Superfortress.

The resulting aircraft first flew on May 19, 1947, and immediately began series production, totalling 847 Tu-4s. Although largely identical in appearance to American B-29s, the Tu-4 (NATO reporting name: "Bull") had Soviet-designed defensive guns and had been re-engineered to suit production using material of metric thicknesses, resulting in an aircraft that was slightly heavier and slower than the B-29. The Tu-4 presented a significant leap forward in Soviet strategic bombing. Not only did the Soviet Air Forces have the means to deliver nuclear weapons, but the Tu-4 had sufficient range to reach the United States on a one-way trip. On October 18, 1951, a Tu-4 was used in the first air-drop test of a Soviet atomic bomb.

The Tu-4 had been phased out of Soviet service by the early 1960s, being replaced by more modern aircraft such as the Tupolev Tu-95. Although the Tu-4 had never delivered any explosive payload with offensive intent, it influenced Soviet aircraft technology, particularly airframe construction and onboard systems. Advanced transport and bomber variants of the Tu-4 design such as the Tu-70, Tu-75, Tu-80, and Tu-85, were developed and built, but none of these achieved series production.

The People's Liberation Army Air Force of China attempted to use the Tu-4 airframe in the KJ-1 AWACS aircraft.

== See also ==
- Boeing B-29 Superfortress
- B-29 Superfortress operators
- B-29 Superfortress survivors
- List of bomber aircraft
- List of military aircraft of the United States
- Strategic Air Command
