= Ilyushin Il-32 =

1948 airlift glider prototype by Ilyushin

- Both the nose and tail hinge lines are visible on this side view of the Il-32

General information
- Type: Cargo glider
- National origin: Soviet Union
- Manufacturer: Ilyushin
- Status: Canceled
- Number built: 1

History
- First flight: 20 August 1948

The Ilyushin Il-32 was a Soviet heavy military glider developed after World War II to deliver 7,000 kg (15,000 lb) of cargo. To facilitate loading and unloading, the glider's nose and tail sections were hinged to swing sideways. The Il-32 required a four-engined aircraft to tow it safely; it was canceled when it became clear that no such tug was going to be available after the Tupolev Tu-75 and Ilyushin Il-18 programs were both canceled because of shortages of their intended Shvetsov ASh-73 engines.

== Development ==
After the end of World War II, the Soviets devoted a considerable amount of effort to developing heavy transport gliders to deliver troops during an airborne assault. As part of this effort, the Council of Ministers ordered the Ilyushin design bureau on 20 September 1947 to begin work on a glider capable of carrying 7,000 kg (15,000 lb) of cargo, including 60 troops or a 122 mm (4.8 in) cannon with its prime mover, ammunition and crew. Its intended tug was the Tupolev Tu-75, a four-engined transport derived from the Tupolev Tu-4.

The Il-32 was an aluminum-bodied, high-wing cantilever monoplane with a fixed tricycle undercarriage whose fuselage was square in cross-section to fit as much cargo as possible. The two-spar wings had a moderate aspect ratio. It was regarded as expendable and was built very simply to facilitate large-scale manufacture. The nose and tail sections swung up to 95° to starboard to facilitate loading.

The Il-32 made its first flight on 20 August 1948, towed by a twin-engined Ilyushin Il-12, but the Il-12 was not powerful enough to tow a fully loaded glider and the four-engined Il-18 airliner prototype was adapted to tow it from 20 September. During these flight tests it reached a cruising speed of 323 km/h (201 mph) at an altitude of 3,000 metres (9,800 ft) and a weight of 16,000 kg (35,000 lb). The flight tests were satisfactory and preparations were made to begin series production, but the lack of suitable tugs was a problem. None of the Soviet four-engined aircraft that could be used were either in production or available. Both the Tupolev Tu-70 and Il-18 airliners had been canceled, as had the Tu-75 transport, and the Tu-4 was dedicated to the strategic bombing mission. Experiments were made with a pair of Il-12s towing the Il-32, but this was both difficult and risky for all involved. The Il-32 was therefore canceled for lack of a proper tug.

== Specifications ==

Data from OKB Ilyushin: A History of the Design Bureau and its Aircraft

General characteristics

- Capacity: 60 troops or 7,000 kg (15,000 lb) of cargo
- Length: 24.84 m (81 ft 6 in)
- Wingspan: 35.8 m (117 ft 5 in)
- Wing area: 159.5 m^{2} (1,716.84 sq ft)
- Empty weight: 9,600 kg (21,164 lb)
- Gross weight: 16,600 kg (36,597 lb)

Performance

- Cruise speed: 327 km/h (203 mph, 176 kn)
- Service ceiling: 4,000 m (13,100 ft)

== See also ==
Aircraft of comparable role, configuration, and era

- Messerschmitt Me 321
- Chase XCG-20
- Tsybin Ts-25

== Bibliography ==
- Gordon, Yefim; Komissarov, Dmitriy and Sergey (2004). OKB Ilyushin: A History of the Design Bureau and its Aircraft. London: Ian Allan. ISBN 1-85780-187-3.
- Zaloga, Steve (1995). Inside the Blue Berets: A Combat History of Soviet and Russian Airborne Forces, 1930–1995 (1995 ed.). Presidio. ISBN 0-89141-399-5.
