= Ilyushin Il-18 (1946) =

Soviet four-engined airliner with piston engines (1946)

General information
- Type: Airliner
- National origin: Soviet Union
- Designer: Ilyushin
- Status: Cancelled
- Number built: 1

History
- First flight: 17 August 1946

The Ilyushin Il-18 (NATO reporting name: Clam) was a Soviet four-engined airliner designed and built by Ilyushin immediately after World War II. Although the aircraft itself was successful, its Shvetsov ASh-73TK engines were too unreliable for civilian use and were further needed to equip the Tupolev Tu-4 bomber, so it was cancelled in 1948.

== Development ==
The Il-18 was developed to meet Aeroflot's need for a high-altitude, long-range aircraft to fly its long-haul national and international routes. It was conceived as a cantilever low-wing monoplane, powered by four Charomskii ACh-32 diesel engines, as initially used in the Ilyushin Il-12, with a tricycle landing gear. To improve the wing's lift-to-drag ratio and the aircraft's maximum speed, the wing was given a very high aspect ratio of 12. It was intended to operate from both paved and unpaved runways with a length of less than 1,000 metres (3,300 ft). Its main wheels were larger than normal to handle the rough surfaces. The pressurized fuselage was circular in cross-section, which provided room for cargo and baggage compartments under the cabin floor. A variety of seating plans were under consideration, ranging from 66 seats to 27 sleeping berths, but no decision had been made before it was canceled.

Before the Il-18 had made its first flight its engines were changed to the 2,400 hp (1,800 kW) Shvetsov ASh-73TK radial piston engine because they were entering production, unlike the diesels. They drove four-blade AV-16NM-95 variable pitch propellers. Electro-thermal deicing boots were fitted on the leading edges of the wings, horizontal and vertical tail, driven by four engine-driven electric generators. A bleed air deicing system was fitted for the cockpit glazing and propeller blades.

The first flight of the Il-18 was made on 18 August 1946, in a sixty-passenger configuration, even though the turbosuperchargers for its engines had not been fitted. To save time Sergey Ilyushin gave the order to commence flight tests without them. However, this proved to be in vain because the manufacturer's flight tests were not concluded until 30 July 1947 as the turbo-superchargers were not delivered in a timely manner. Other problems were the short time between overhauls for the ASh-73TKs, initially only 25 hours, and the disintegration of one engine on 25 June 1947. Flight characteristics were docile and the passenger cabin proved to be far more comfortable than those of the Lisunov Li-2, the C-47 Skytrain or the Il-12. It had a comfortable margin of power that allowed it to continue to cruise if one or even two engines weren't running. Its engines were in short supply as they were needed to power the Tupolev Tu-4 and they were not yet reliable enough for economical use so the aircraft was canceled.

The prototype was displayed at the 1947 air display at Tushino where it led a formation of Il-12 airliners. Later it was fitted with a towing shackle and used for flight tests of the heavy Ilyushin Il-32 glider, as it was one of the few aircraft available powerful enough to tow the glider. It was flown well into the early 1950s although its ultimate fate is unknown.

== Specifications ==
Data from Nemecek, The History of Soviet Aircraft from 1918

General characteristics

- Crew: 6
- Capacity: 60
- Length: 29.86 m (97 ft 11 in)
- Wingspan: 41.20 m (134 ft 10.25 in)
- Wing area: 140 m^{2} (1,506 sq ft)
- Empty weight: 28,490 kg (62,810 lb)
- Gross weight: 42,500 kg (93,696 lb)
- Powerplant: 4 × Shvetsov ASh-73TK radial piston engine , 1,800 kW (2,400 hp) each

Performance

- Maximum speed: 565 km/h (351 mph, 305 kn)
- Cruise speed: 450 km/h (280 mph, 240 kn)
- Range: 6,200 km (3,850 mi, 3,350 nmi)
- Service ceiling: 10,700 m (35,000 ft)

== See also ==
Aircraft of comparable role, configuration, and era

- Tupolev Tu-70
