= Dobrynin VD-4K =

Soviet-designed large turboprop aircraft engine

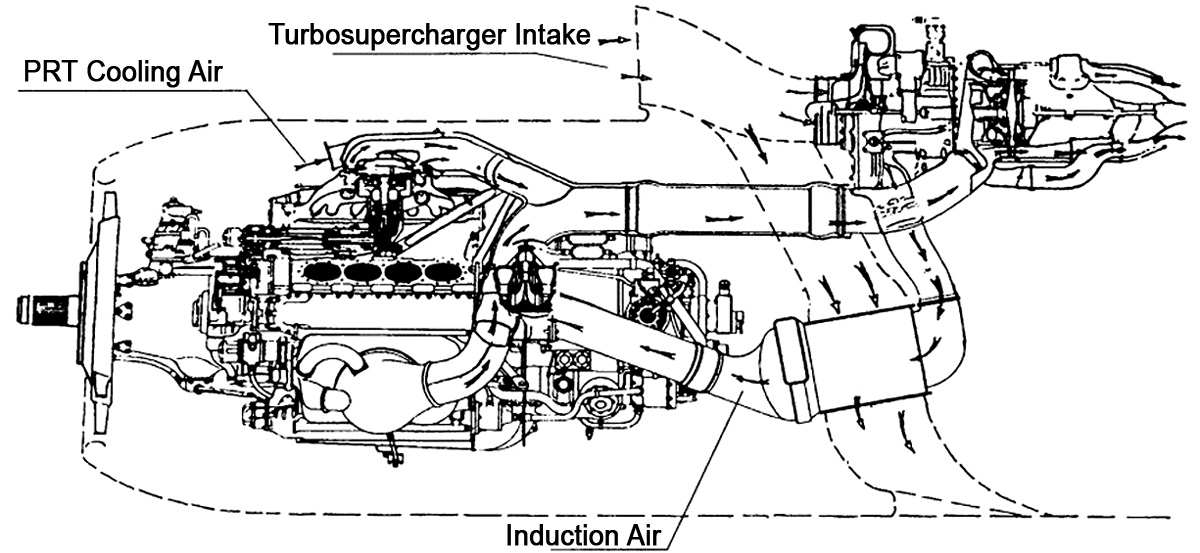
- Type: Six-bank turbo-compound, inline radial engine
- National origin: Soviet Union
- Manufacturer: Dobrynin OKB-36 in Rybinsk
- First run: June 1950
- Major applications: Tupolev Tu-85
- Number built: 23

The Dobrynin VD-4K was a Soviet six-bank, 24-cylinder, turbo-compound, inline radial engine developed after the end of World War II. It was superseded by turboprop engines before it could be widely used.

== Development ==
The VD-4K, originally designated as the M-253K, was a development of the post-war VD-3TK (M-251K) engine. Like Nazi Germany's experimental Junkers Jumo 222 multibank wartime engine, the VD-4K had six monobloc banks, each with four liquid-cooled cylinders. However, the VD-4K had a larger displacement figure — at nearly 59.5 litres — than any planned or tested development of the German powerplant; itself only planned to have a top displacement figure of 55.5 litres, with a 145 x 140 mm bore-stroke figure for each cylinder in its planned 222C/D version. The VD-4K utilized a trio of blow-down exhaust, also known as power-recovery, turbines were fitted between the cylinder banks, which made it a turbo-compound engine. A geared centrifugal supercharger and a turbocharger were also fitted to the engine itself.

Development began in January 1949 and construction of the prototype began in September of that year. The first engine was completed in January 1950 and it underwent its 100-hour tests in June. It successfully passed its State acceptance tests in January–February 1951. It was evaluated aboard a Tupolev Tu-4 bomber in 1950, itself powered with a quartet of the Shvetsov OKB's 1946-origin, ASh-73 radial engines, each of a displacement figure of 58.1 litres, somewhat close to that of the Dobrynin multibank powerplant design. The Dobrynin engines were most notably fitted to the two prototypes of the Tupolev Tu-85 bomber, but the aircraft, and its engines, was not placed into production because of the promise offered by turboprop engines of immensely more power, like the Kuznetsov NK-12 — itself developed and in test by 1951 — and used on the Tupolev Tu-95 strategic bomber

== Applications ==
- Tupolev Tu-4
- Tupolev Tu-85

== Specifications (VD-4K) ==
Data from Kotelnikov

=== General characteristics ===
- Type: 6-bank, 24-cylinder, turbo-compound inline radial engine
- Bore: 148 mm (5.8 in)
- Stroke: 144 mm (5.7 in)
- Displacement: 59.43 L (3,627 cu in)
- Length: 2.5 m (8 ft 2 in)
- Diameter: 1.4 m (4 ft 7 in)
- Dry weight: 4,553 lb (2,065 kg)

=== Components ===
- Cooling system: Liquid-cooled

=== Performance ===
- Power output: 4,300 hp (3,200 kW)
- Compression ratio: 7:1

== See also ==
Comparable engines

- Napier Nomad
- Armstrong Siddeley Hyena
- Armstrong Siddeley Deerhound
- Lycoming R-7755
- Daimler-Benz DB 604
- Shvetsov ASh-2
- Wright R-2160 Tornado
- Junkers Jumo 222
- BMW 803

Related lists

- List of aircraft engines
