= Nikolai Rybko =

- Native name: Николай Степанович Рыбко
- Born: 26 March [O.S. 13 March] 1911; Moscow, Russian Empire
- Died: 28 August 1977 (aged 66); Moscow, Soviet Union
- Allegiance: Soviet Union
- Awards: Hero of the Soviet Union; Honoured Test Pilot of the USSR

Nikolai Stepanovich Rybko (Russian: Николай Степанович Рыбко; 26 March [O.S. 13 March] 1911 – 28 August 1977) was a decorated test pilot and lead engineer of the Gromov Flight Research Institute. He participated in tests of roughly 110 aircraft types and variations before his piloting career was cut short in 1954 by injuries from a car accident that left him grounded.

== Early life ==
Rybko was born on 26 March [O.S. 13 March] 1911 in Moscow. His father Stepan was a church elder and later repressed for it, and as a result Nikolai was denied entry to certain higher education institutions despite his good grades and aptitude for engineering. Not giving up, Rybko continued to pursue an education, studied the English language, and after working as a driver for several years he was accepted as a technician at the Central Aerohydrodynamic Institute (TsAGI) in 1932.

== Test pilot career ==
Having started working with aircraft as a technician the previous year, Rybko went on to graduate from Moscow Aviation College in 1933 and subsequently the TsAGI flight school as well as the Kachin Military Aviation School of Pilots in 1935. (Note: Rybko was an "external student" at the Kachin Military Aviation School of Pilots, not a regular cadet, and as such, he was never formally a member of the air force, but he did train and fly alongside other members) From then to 1939 he worked as a test pilot at TsAGI, testing various aircraft and flight maneuvers including the VIT-1 in 1937, the Steel-11 from 1937 to 1938, the "Strela" and "Ivanov" in 1938, as well as spin tests on the I-14 (1937), I-16 (1938), and PI (1939) fighters plus range tests on the ANT-37 bomber in 1938; previously, he participated in the first flight of the ANT-42/Pe-8 long-range bomber in 1936 and went on to conduct a variety of tests on it until 1937. Twice during flight tests he had to bail out from a plane with a parachute for safety reasons. In 1939 Rybko stopped working as a test pilot at the institute after sustaining a leg injury in a motorcycle crash that left him grounded for over a year. Surgeons considered amputation of the leg due to the multiple fractures and gangrene, but his friends and colleagues, including Chkalov and Gromov, begged the doctors to not amputate. Eventually after prolonged rehabilitation he partially recovered and took up work as an engineer in April 1941, but in June that year he was permitted to return to flying. During the war he continued to work as a test pilot, testing the Yak-7A, Yak-7B, Yak-9U, Mosquito-IV, Shche-2, 302P, Pe-2VI, and Il-6. After the end of the war he continued to work as a test pilot, conducting flight tests on a captured Bf 109 fighter in 1946; subsequently, he flew tests on the MiG-9 in 1947, and from that year to 1949 he (along with Sergei Anokhin and Amet-khan Sultan) participated in tests of the LL-2 experimental glider. During that same period, he flew tests on the Tu-4 long-range bomber, piloting its maiden flight on 19 May 1947. Later he took part in tests of the MiG-15.

In 1951 Rybko transferred to the Tupolev Design Bureau, where he went on to pilot the maiden flight of the Tu-16 jet bomber in 1952 and conduct subsequent flight tests on it, but he did not work as a test pilot for Tupolev for very long because he was severely injured in a car crash in 1954. Throughout his career he piloted and tested about 110 different kinds of aircraft and gliders.

== Later life ==
After the second car accident left him unable to fly, Rybko continued to work for the Tupolev Design Bureau, but as an engineer. On 1 May 1957 he was awarded the title Hero of the Soviet Union for his bravery in testing new aviation technology, and on 17 February 1959 he included in among the first ten people awarded the title Honoured Test Pilot of the USSR. In 1963 he retired from Tupolev, having been a lead engineer in the bureau at one point. He lived for the remainder of his life in Moscow, where he died on 28 August 1977 and was buried in the Donskoye Cemetery. (Note: The title Honoured Test Pilot of the USSR was usually awarded to people while they were employed as test pilot, but because the title did not exist until 1959 and he was considered worthy of the award he was awarded it.)

== Awards and honors ==
- Hero of the Soviet Union
- Honoured Test Pilot of the USSR
- Four Orders of Lenin
- Order of the Red Banner
- Order of the Patriotic War, 1st class
- Order of the Red Banner of Labour
- Medal "For the Victory over Germany in the Great Patriotic War 1941–1945"
