= Tupolev Tu-80 =

Prototype for a longer-ranged version of the Tu-4 bomber

General information
- Type: Heavy bomber
- National origin: Soviet Union
- Manufacturer: Tupolev
- Status: Cancelled
- Number built: 1

History
- First flight: 1 December 1949
- Developed from: Tupolev Tu-4
- Developed into: Tupolev Tu-85

The Tupolev Tu-80 (Russian: Туполев Ту-80) was a Soviet prototype for a longer-ranged version of the Tupolev Tu-4 bomber, an unlicensed, reverse engineered copy of the Boeing B-29 Superfortress. It was cancelled in 1949 in favor of the Tupolev Tu-85 program which offered even more range. The sole prototype was used in various test programs before finally being used as a target.

== Development ==
The Tu-80 was designed as a modernized and enlarged Tu-4 with greater range. This was to be achieved by the use of more fuel-efficient engines, better aerodynamics and added fuel tanks. It was intended to have a range of 7,000–8,000 kilometres (4,300–5,000 mi) and carry a maximum bombload of 12,000 kilograms (26,000 lb) with a top speed of 620 kilometres per hour (390 mph). Work began on the design in February 1948 and this was confirmed by a Council of Ministers order of 12 June that required the prototype be ready for State acceptance trials in July 1949.

The forward portion of the fuselage was redesigned with an airliner-style stepped windscreen and the fuselage was lengthened by almost 4 m (13 ft) which allowed the bomb bays and their doors to be lengthened. The radar and its operator were moved into the forward pressurized compartment and the radar itself was located in the "chin" position in a new streamlined fairing. The wings were enlarged to a total of 173 square metres (1,860 sq ft) and the rubber deicing boots were replaced by more efficient and aerodynamic bleed air deicers. The engine nacelles were redesigned with smaller cross-sections with less drag. Originally, Shvetsov ASh-2TK or Dobrynin VD-3TK engines were considered, but neither engine was ready so the Shvetsov ASh-73TKFN was used. Fully feathering propellers were also used. All of these changes increased the lift/drag ratio to 18 from the 17.0 of the Tu-4.

Construction of the Tu-80 began in November 1948, using as many Tu-4 components as possible to speed up construction, but the first flight was not until 1 December 1949, after the Council of Ministers had canceled the program on 16 September 1949 in favor of the Tu-85 which was expected to have much better performance. The Tu-80 became a research aircraft, testing reversible-pitch propellers and structural deformation in heavy aircraft, before eventually became a target on a bombing and gunnery range.

== Specifications ==
Data from The Osprey Encyclopedia of Russian Aircraft 1975–1995

General characteristics

- Crew: 11
- Length: 34.37 m (112 ft 9 in)
- Wingspan: 43.58 m (143 ft 0 in)
- Height: 8.91 m (29 ft 3 in)
- Wing area: 173.1 m^{2} (1,863 sq ft)
- Empty weight: 37,850 kg (83,445 lb)
- Gross weight: 51,500 kg (113,538 lb)
- Max takeoff weight: 60,600 kg (133,600 lb)
- Powerplant: 4 × Shvetsov ASh-73TKFN 18-cylinder air-cooled radial piston engines, 1,980 kW (2,650 hp) each

Performance

- Maximum speed: 545 km/h (339 mph, 294 kn)
- Range: 8,214 km (5,104 mi, 4,435 nmi) estimated
- Service ceiling: 11,180 m (36,680 ft)
- Wing loading: 363 kg/m^{2} (74 lb/sq ft)
- Power/mass: 0.13 kW/kg (0.079 hp/lb)

Armament

- Guns: 10x 23 mm (0.906 in) Nudelman-Rikhter NR-23 cannon
- Bombs: 3,000–12,000 kg (6,614–26,455 lb)

== See also ==
Related development

- Boeing B-29 Superfortress
- Tupolev Tu-4
- Tupolev Tu-70
- Tupolev Tu-75
- Tupolev Tu-85

Aircraft of comparable role, configuration, and era

- Boeing B-50 Superfortress

== Bibliography ==
- Gordon, Yefim; Rigamant, Vladimir (2005). OKB Tupolev: A History of the Design Bureau and its Aircraft. Hinckley, England: Midland Publishing. ISBN 1-85780-214-4.
- Gunston, Bill (1995). The Osprey Encyclopedia of Russian Aircraft 1875–1995. London: Osprey. ISBN 1-85532-405-9.
- Gunston, Bill (1995). Tupolev Aircraft since 1922. Annapolis, Maryland: Naval Institute Press. ISBN 1-55750-882-8.
