= Tupolev Tu-85 =

Prototype strategic bomber aircraft based on Tu-4

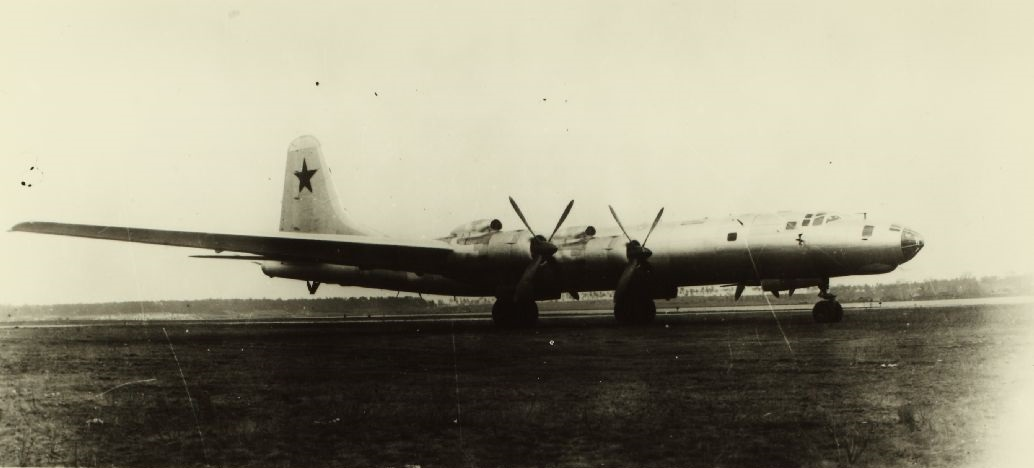

General information
- Type: Heavy/Strategic bomber
- National origin: Soviet Union
- Manufacturer: Tupolev
- Status: Cancelled
- Number built: 2

History
- First flight: 9 January 1951
- Developed from: Tupolev Tu-4; Tupolev Tu-80

The Tupolev Tu-85 (Russian: Туполев Ту-85; USAF/DoD reporting name: "Type 31", NATO reporting name: Barge) was a Soviet prototype strategic bomber based on the Tu-4, an unlicensed, reverse engineered copy of the Boeing B-29 Superfortress. It was the ultimate development of the B-29 family, being over 50% heavier than its progenitor and had nearly double the range. Only two prototypes were built before the program was cancelled in favor of the turboprop powered Tupolev Tu-95 bomber which could cover the same range at a far higher speed.

== Development ==
Neither the Tu-4 nor the Tu-80 were true intercontinental strategic bombers as they both lacked the range to attack the United States from bases in the Soviet Union and return. The Tu-85 was designed to achieve the necessary range by use of more powerful and fuel-efficient engines, a redesigned wing to increase the lift/drag ratio and the addition of more fuel. A large number of engines were considered before settling on the 4,500-horsepower (3,400 kW) Shvetsov ASh-2K, essentially two air-cooled ASh-82 radial engines paired together and the liquid-cooled 4,300-horsepower (3,200 kW) Dobrynin VD-4K six-bank inline engine, similar in configuration to the unsuccessful German Junkers Jumo 222. Both proposed powerplants were given turbochargers and power-recovery turbines to turn them into turbo-compound engines. The Shvetsov design was preferred, but was not yet mature enough for use, and the VD-4K was selected. A lot of effort was put into refining the design of the wing in collaboration with TsAGI. It had an aspect ratio of 11.745 and a taper of 2.93 for optimum lift at high altitudes. The Tu-85 carried 63,600 litres (16,800 US gal) of fuel in 48 flexible tanks.

Much of the armament and equipment was derived from those of the late-model Tu-4, including the four remotely-controlled dorsal and ventral gun turrets and the tail turret, each with two 23 mm (0.91 in) Nudelman-Rikhter NR-23 cannon. But the Tu-85's tail turret had an Argon range-only radar and each of the two bomb bays was enlarged to hold a 9,000 kg (20,000 lb) FAB-9000 bomb.

Actual design work began in August 1948 and was ratified by a directive from the Council of Ministers dated 16 September that required the first prototype to be ready for manufacturer's tests in December 1950. Construction of the first aircraft began in July 1950 and was completed in September. It first flew on 9 January 1951 and the manufacturer's tests lasted until October. On 12 September the first prototype flew 9,020 km (5,600 mi) with a bombload of 5,000 kg (11,000 lb) which it dropped en route, landing with enough fuel remaining to have covered a total of 12,018 km (7,468 mi). The second prototype, sometimes referred to as the 85D (dooblyor) or 85/2, incorporated the lessons learned from the first aircraft, including revision and reinforcement of the airframe and a variety of changes to its equipment and systems. It was first flown on 28 June 1951 and its trials lasted until November.

Series production was approved on 23 March 1951 at three factories where it would succeed the Tu-4 on the production line, but this was reversed later in the year and the program was cancelled; during the Korean War Soviet MiG-15s brought down many American B-29s, showing that there was no longer a future in aerial combat for piston-powered aircraft. Priority was given to the higher-performance turboprop Tu-95 'Bear', as its own turboprop powerplants, the TV-12 prototype series for the Kuznetsov NK-12 turboprops that power the Tu-95 to this day, were already generating 12,000 shp (8,900 kW) as early as 1951.

== Specifications (Tu-85/1, 4VD-4K) ==
Data from OKB Tupolev: A History of the Design Bureau and its Aircraft

General characteristics

- Crew: 11–12
- Length: 39.306 m (128 ft 11 in)
- Wingspan: 55.96 m (183 ft 7 in)
- Height: 11.358 m (37 ft 3 in)
- Wing area: 273.6 m^{2} (2,945 sq ft)
- Aspect ratio: 11.745
- Airfoil: root: Boeing 117 (22%); tip: Boeing 117 (9%)
- Empty weight: 54,711 kg (120,617 lb)
- Gross weight: 76,000 kg (167,551 lb) normal take off weight
- Max takeoff weight: 107,292 kg (236,538 lb)
- Powerplant: 4 × Dobrynin VD-4K 24-cylinder liquid-cooled, turbo-compound, six-bank, inline radial engines, 3,200 kW (4,300 hp) each for take-off
- Propellers: 4-bladed

Performance

- Maximum speed: 638 km/h (396 mph, 344 kn) at 10,000 m (33,000 ft)
- Range: 12,018 km (7,468 mi, 6,489 nmi) with 107,225 kg (236,391 lb) take-off weight
- Service ceiling: 11,700 m (38,400 ft)
- Rate of climb: 17 m/s (3,300 ft/min)
- Wing loading: 277 kg/m^{2} (57 lb/sq ft)
- Power/mass: 0.170 kW/kg (0.103 hp/lb)

Armament

- Guns: 10 × 23 mm Nudelman NR-23 cannon, two each in five turrets
- Bombs: 5,000–18,000 kg (11,000–40,000 lb)

== See also ==
Related development

- Boeing B-29 Superfortress
- Tupolev Tu-4
- Tupolev Tu-70
- Tupolev Tu-75
- Tupolev Tu-80

Aircraft of comparable role, configuration, and era

- Boeing B-50 Superfortress
- Convair B-36 Peacemaker
