= KJ-1 AEWC =

Chinese Airborne Early Warning radar fitted to a Tu-4 bomber

KJ-1
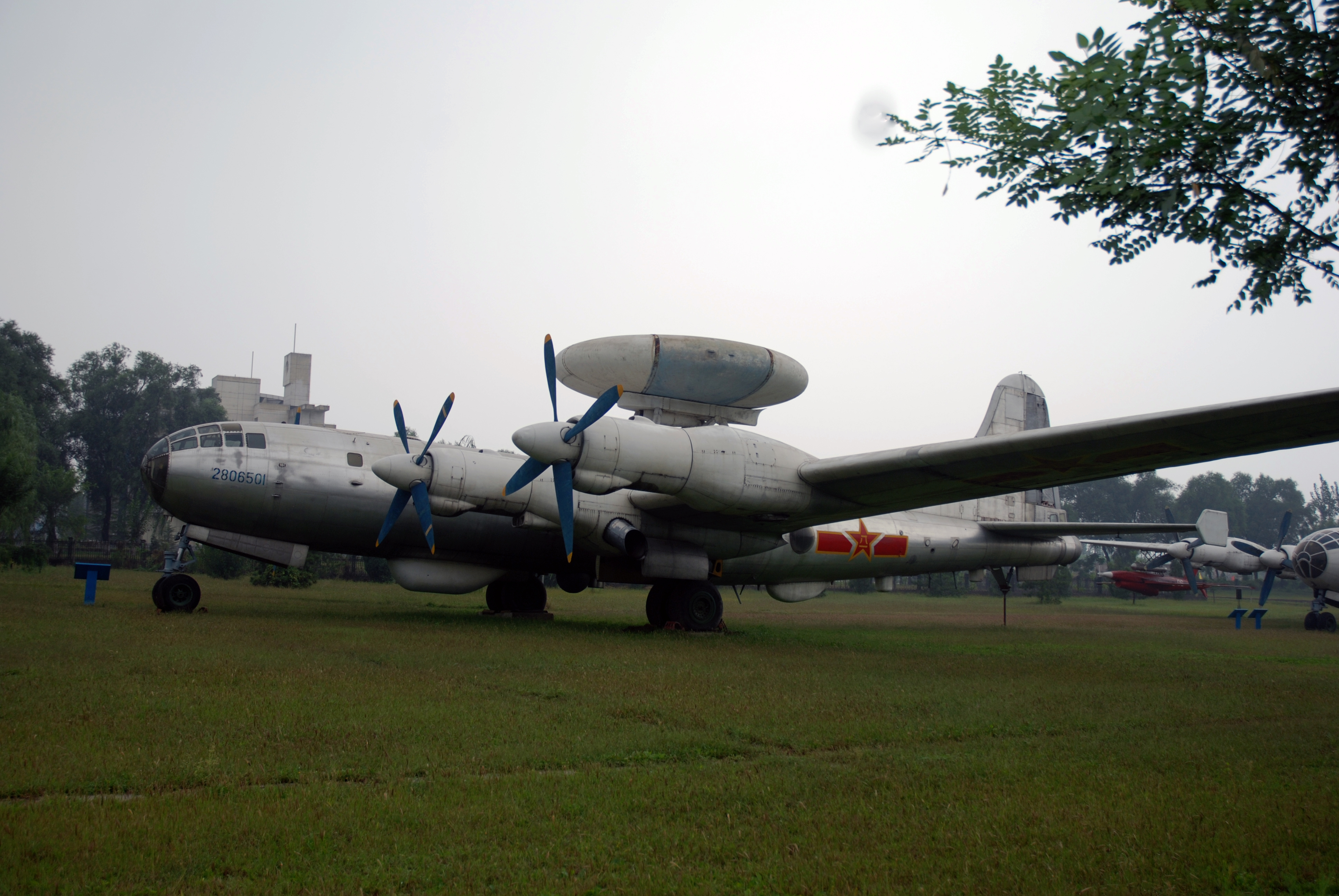
- KJ-1 AEWC replica at the China Aviation Museum

General information
- Type: Airborne Early Warning and Control
- National origin: People's Republic of China (PRC)
- Status: cancelled
- Number built: 1

History
- Developed from: Tupolev Tu-4

The KJ-1 (from Chinese: 空警; pinyin: Kōng Jǐng, short for 空中预警 kōngzhōng yùjǐng meaning "airborne early warning") was a Chinese experimental airborne early warning (AEW) aircraft, based on a Tupolev Tu-4 bomber aircraft (itself being an unlicensed, reverse engineered copy of the Boeing B-29 Superfortress). The project was started in 1969 under the code name "Project 926", but only one prototype was built before the project was put on hold indefinitely until it was finally cancelled in 1979.

== Design and development ==
The KJ-1 was the first-generation AEW aircraft developed by the People's Republic of China. According to Chinese government claims, a single KJ-1 would have functions equivalent to more than 40 ground radar stations, but the test flight in the early 70s experienced severe mid-flight vibrations that could not be solved, and the development was stopped later amongst the political chaos of the Cultural Revolution.

During the reform and opening up, the project was once again put on hold due to cuts in military budget as economic development was given top priority. When the project was finally reviewed again in 1978 for the modernization of the People's Liberation Army Air Force, it was considered obsolete, and the project was terminated in 1979. The only KJ-1 aircraft built was dismantled after the project was scrapped, and the KJ-1 now on display at the China Aviation Museum in Beijing is actually a reconstructed replica converted using another Tu-4.

In the KJ-1's place, PRC developed a phased-array radar for its KJ-2000 AWACS aircraft, based on a modified Ilyushin Il-76 airframe.
