= RDS-5 =

Plutonium-based Soviet atomic bomb

The RDS-5 (Russian: РДС-5) was a plutonium based Soviet atomic bomb, probably using a hollow core. Two versions were made. The first version used 2 kg Pu-239 and was expected to yield 9.2 kilotons. The second version used only 0.8 kg Pu-239.

== Testing ==
The two versions of the RDS-5 were tested during a series of 3 tests on September 3, 8 and 10 1953 in the Semipalatinsk test site. The test on September 3 (Joe 6.) was probably of the 2 kg version and achieved a yield of 5.8 kilotons (compared to the expected 9.2 kiloton yield). The test on September 8 was probably of the 0.8 kg version and yielded 1.6 kilotons.

== See also ==
- Soviet atomic bomb project
- RDS-1
