= Tupolev Tu-70 =

Prototype airliner variant of Tu-4 bomber

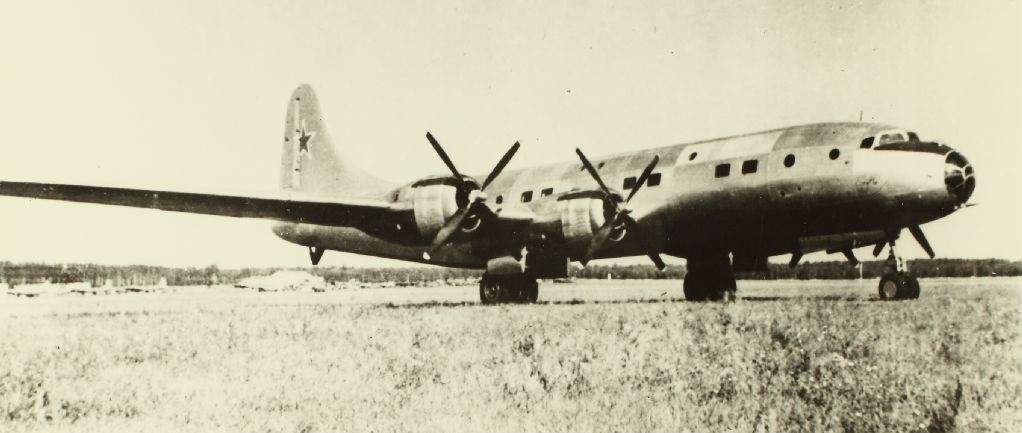

General information
- Type: Airliner
- National origin: Soviet Union
- Manufacturer: Tupolev
- Status: Cancelled
- Number built: 1

History
- First flight: 27 November 1946
- Developed from: Tupolev Tu-4
- Variant: Tupolev Tu-75

The Tupolev Tu-70 (Russian: Туполев Ту-70; NATO reporting name: Cart) was a Soviet passenger variant of the Tu-4 bomber, an unlicensed, reverse engineered copy of the Boeing B-29 Superfortress. Designed immediately after the end of World War II, it used a number of components from Boeing B-29s that had made emergency landings in the Soviet Union after bombing Japan. It had the first pressurized fuselage in the Soviet Union and first flew on 27 November 1946. The aircraft was successfully tested, recommended for serial production, but ultimately not produced because of more pressing military orders and because Aeroflot had no requirement for such an aircraft. A military cargo aircraft version was the Tupolev Tu-75.

== Design and development ==
After basic design work was completed on the Tu-4 bomber, Tupolev decided to design a passenger variant with a pressurized fuselage, given the internal designation of Tu-70. It was intended to use as many Tu-4 components as possible to reduce cost and save development time. It was a low-wing, cantilever monoplane with tricycle landing gear, powered by four Shvetsov ASh-73TK radial engines. Design work on a mockup began in February 1946 and the Council of Ministers confirmed an order for a single prototype the following month. A production decision for the Tu-12, as it was to be known, would be made after testing.

To speed up construction of the prototype, a number of components were utilized from two B-29s. These included the outer wing panels, the engine cowlings, the flaps, the undercarriage, the tail assembly and some of the internal equipment. The wing center section was redesigned and its span increased. The pressurized fuselage was entirely new and changed the wing's position from mid-wing to low-wing. The aircraft's cockpit windscreen was changed to a more conventional "stepped" configuration. Three different configurations were proposed for the cabin layout, a government VIP version, a mixed-class 40–48 passenger model and an airliner configuration with 72 seats. The prototype appears to have been built in the mixed-class configuration, but that cannot be confirmed.

The Tu-70 was completed in October 1946, but did not make its first flight until 27 November. It began manufacturer's trials in October, but an engine fire on the fourth flight caused it to make a crash-landing. This was traced to a design defect in the American-built supercharger-control system, but identifying the problem and fixing it prolonged the manufacturer's trials through October 1947. It was redesignated as the Tu-70 when it went through the State acceptance trials which ended on 14 December. It met all the design goals, but was not accepted for production as all the factories were already committed to building aircraft with a higher priority and Aeroflot had no requirement for the type, being fully satisfied with its existing Ilyushin Il-12 airliners.

It was sent to the NII VVS (Russian: Научно-Исследовательский Институт Военно-Воздушных Сил – Scientific-Research Institute of the Air Forces) for evaluation as a military transport aircraft in December 1951. It was used afterwards for a variety of tests before being scrapped in 1954. Its design was modified to a military transport as the Tupolev Tu-75, but this was also not placed into production.

== Specifications ==

Data from

General characteristics

- Crew: 7-8
- Capacity: 72 pax
- Length: 35.4 m (116 ft 2 in)
- Wingspan: 44.25 m (145 ft 2 in)
- Height: 9.75 m (32 ft 0 in)
- Wing area: 166.1 m^{2} (1,788 sq ft)
- Empty weight: 38,290 kg (84,415 lb)
- Gross weight: 51,400 kg (113,318 lb)
- Powerplant: 4 × Shvetsov ASh-73TK 18-cylinder air-cooled radial piston engines, 1,800 kW (2,400 hp) each
- Propellers: 4-bladed constant-speed propellers

Performance

- Maximum speed: 568 km/h (353 mph, 307 kn) at 9,000 m (30,000 ft)
- Range: 2,500 km (1,600 mi, 1,300 nmi)
- Service ceiling: 11,000 m (36,000 ft)
- Wing loading: 361 kg/m^{2} (74 lb/sq ft)
- Power/mass: 0.14 kW/kg (0.085 hp/lb)

== See also ==
Related development

- Boeing B-29 Superfortress
- Tupolev Tu-4
- Tupolev Tu-75
- Tupolev Tu-80
- Tupolev Tu-85

Aircraft of comparable role, configuration, and era

- Boeing 377 Stratocruiser
- Ilyushin Il-18

Related lists

- List of civil aircraft
