= Shvetsov ASh-73 =

Soviet aircraft engine

ASh-73
- Type: Radial engine
- National origin: Soviet Union
- Manufacturer: Shvetsov (OKB-19)
- First run: 1946
- Major applications: Beriev Be-6; Tupolev Tu-4
- Number built: 14,310
- Developed from: Shvetsov M-71

The Shvetsov ASh-73 (Russian: Швецов АШ-73) was an 18-cylinder, air-cooled, radial aircraft engine produced between 1947 and 1957 in the Soviet Union. It was primarily used as the powerplant for the Tupolev Tu-4 heavy bomber, an unlicensed, reverse engineered copy of the American Boeing B-29 Superfortress.

== Design and development ==
The Shvetsov ASh-73 originated in 1938 from a specification for an 18-cylinder, twin-row, development of the Shvetsov M-25, a license-built 9-cylinder, air-cooled, radial Wright R-1820-F3 Cyclone engine. Development continued through a series of less than successful engines, before culminating in the ASh-73. The ASh-73 was not a reverse-engineered copy of the Wright R-3350 Duplex-Cyclone, itself starting its development in 1937: "There was no need to copy the Wright R-3350-23A; the engine that was put into production was the indigenous ASh-73TK - a further development of the M-71 and M-72, which differed in being fitted with twin TK-19 turbosuperchargers (TK = toorbokompressor)." rather the ASh-73 was the product of a similar specification. Since the earlier M-25 engines were a licensed copy of the Wright R-1820, there were similarities and some parts were interchangeable between the Duplex Cyclone and the ASh-73 powerplants. The two engines evolved from a common ancestor and to a similar requirement. "In the late 1930s and the early 1940s OKB-19 evolved two 18-cylinder two-row radials — the 2,000-hp M-71 and the 2,250-hp M-72 — which were similar in their design features and production techniques to the Wright Duplex Cyclone engines powering the B-29."

The progenitor for the ASh-73 was the M-70. It was tested in late 1938 and was a failure because of cracks in the master connecting rod and the geared centrifugal supercharger's impeller. The exhaust valves also burnt through. The M-71 of 1939 was the successor to the M-70 and it too was not a success. It used some components from the M-62 engine, but its development was slowed by the German attack on the Soviet Union in 1941. It passed its State acceptance tests in the autumn of 1942, but was not placed into production as there was not any production capacity available, although it was tested on a number of different prototypes during the war. The M-72 of early 1945 was a boosted version of the M-71 and was superseded by the ASh-73 before production could get underway.

The first prototypes of the ASh-73 were built in 1945 and by the end of 1946 testing had completed successfully. The first models to enter production in 1947 lacked turbo-superchargers. They weighed 1,330 kg (2,930 lb) and had 2,400 hp (1,800 kW) during take-off. The ASh-73TK had two TK-19 turbochargers and an intercooler fitted which were direct copies of the units used on the R-3350. The engine was upgraded over the course of its production. On the fourth series of engines the crankshaft nose was changed, the articulated connecting rods were strengthened and the accessory drive was changed. The middle part of the crankcase and the pistons were strengthened and the ignition was improved in the fifth series. In the sixth series the master connecting rod and the crankshaft cheeks were strengthened, the pistons were lightened and shortened. For the seventh series exhaust valves with floating seats were introduced and the reduction gearing was improved.

The displacement of the ASh-73 ended up being slightly larger than the Wright Duplex-Cyclone radials of the B-29 - while having the same cylinder count and basic layout, the ASh-73 possessed a 58.122 liter (3,546.8 in3) displacement figure, some 6% larger than its American contemporary's 54.86 L (3,347.9 in3) displacement figure.

A boosted version was developed as the ASh-82TKF that had a rating of 2,720 hp (2,030 kW). It was bench tested, but not put into production. A further development in 1949 was the ASh-73TKFN with fuel injection that boosted power to 2,800 hp (2,100 kW), but it too was not built. Another 1949 project was an ASh-73TK with a power-recovery turbine to create a turbo-compound engine, but no other information is known.

Factory No. 19 began preparation to build the ASh-73 in 1946, but production did not begin until the next year. Production continued there until 1953. Factory No. 36 in Rybinsk also produced it until 1957. A total of 14,310 ASh-73s were built. A number of these were exported to the People's Republic of China during the 1950s as spare parts for their Tu-4s.

== Applications ==
- Beriev Be-6
- Ilyushin Il-18 (1946)
- Petlyakov Pe-8 (in service with Aeroflot, post-war)
- Tupolev Tu-4
- Tupolev Tu-70
- Tupolev Tu-75
- Tupolev Tu-80

== Specifications (Shvetsov ASh-73TK) ==
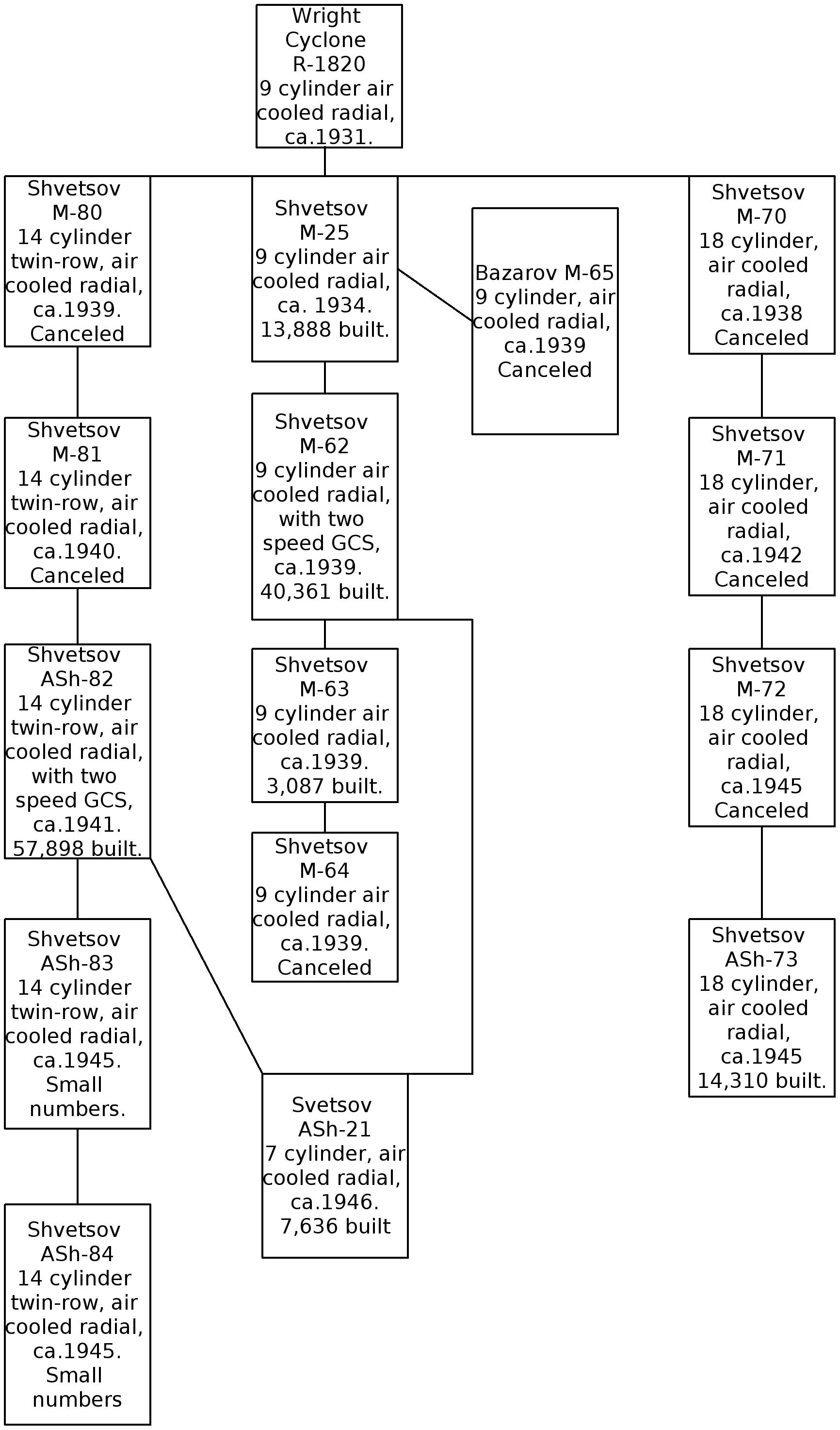
Family tree of Shvetsov engines

Data from Gordon and Rigmant, Tupolev Tu-4: Soviet Superfortress

=== General characteristics ===
- Type: 18-cylinder two-row radial engine.
- Bore: 155.5 mm (6.12 in)
- Stroke: 170 mm (6.7 in)
- Displacement: 58.122 Liters (3,546.8 cu in)
- Length: 2.29 m (7 ft 6 in)
- Diameter: 1.375 m (4 ft 6.1 in)
- Dry weight: 1,339 kg (2,951 Ib)

=== Components ===
- Valvetrain: Pushrod, two valves per cylinder with sodium-cooled exhaust valve.
- Supercharger: Two-stage supercharging system with intercooler. First stage consisted of two TK-19 exhaust-driven turbochargers (toorbokompressor) operating in parallel (two speeds automatically controlled by an electronic governor). Second stage consisted of a PTsN single-speed engine-driven centrifugal blower (privodnoy tsentrobezniy nagnetahtel, приводной центробежный нагнетатель). Boost was limited to 1.5 Atm with low octane fuel.
- Fuel system: Carburettors with automatic mixture control (last version with direct fuel injection).
- Fuel type: 92/93 octane fuel, 95 or 100 octane.
- Cooling system: Air-cooled
- Reduction gear: 0.375:1

=== Performance ===
- Power output:
- With direct fuel injection:
- 2720 hp (2.00 MW) at 2,600 RPM for take-off (Dry)
- 2,360 hp (1,760 kW) at 2,400 RPM maximum continuous
- With Carburettors and 92/93 octane fuel:
- 2,400 hp (1,800 kW) at 2,600 RPM for take-off (Dry), boost rated at 1.5 Atm. (43.8", 7.35psi)
- 2,200 hp (1,600 kW) at 2,400 RPM at critical altitude of 8,500 m (27,900 ft)
- 2,000 hp (1,500 kW) at 2,400 RPM at 9,000 m (30,000 ft)
- Specific power: 30.8 kW/L (0.676 hp/in^{3})
- Compression ratio: 6.9:1
- Specific fuel consumption: 350 g/hp•h (0.77 Ib/hp•hr) for take-off, 315-335 g/hp•hr (0.69-0.74 Ib/hp•hr) at nominal power (carburettor version).

== See also ==
Related development

- Shvetsov M-25
- Shvetsov M-71
- Wright R-1820 Cyclone

Comparable engines

- Wright R-3350 Duplex-Cyclone

Related lists

- List of aircraft engines
