= Tupolev Tu-75 =

Military transport version of Tu-4 bomber

General information
- Type: Transport
- National origin: Soviet Union
- Manufacturer: Tupolev
- Status: Cancelled
- Number built: 1

History
- First flight: 21 January 1950
- Developed from: Tupolev Tu-4/Tupolev Tu-70

The Tupolev Tu-75 (Russian: Туполев Ту-75) was a military transport variant of the Tu-4 bomber, an unlicensed, reverse engineered copy of the Boeing B-29 Superfortress. The Tu-75 was similar to the Tu-70 airliner, both using a new, purpose-designed fuselage. The first Soviet military machine of this class, it was equipped with a rear fuselage loading ramp. It was not placed into production because the VVS decided it would be cheaper to modify its existing Tu-4s for the transport mission and to use its existing Lisunov Li-2 and Ilyushin Il-12 transports.

== Design and development ==
The Tupolev OKB began work in September 1946 on a military transport version of the Tupolev Tu-70 airliner and this was confirmed by the Council of Ministers on 11 March 1947 with state trials to begin in August 1948. To expedite the process, maximum use was made of components of the Tu-70. Its engines were the uprated Shvetsov ASh-73TKFN or TKNV fuel-injected version. A new, narrower fuselage was designed, which included a rear cargo hatch, a vehicle loading ramp and paratroop exit doors. Three gun turrets (dorsal, ventral and tail), were to be adapted from the Tu-4, although they were not fitted on the prototype. It had a crew of six (two pilots, three gunners, a radio operator, and a navigator).

The aircraft was intended for three different roles; transport, parachute transport and aerial ambulance. In the first role it was designed to carry two ASU-76 assault guns, two STZ NATI artillery tractors, six or seven GAZ-67B jeeps or five 85 mm (3.3 in) guns without their prime movers or any combination of equipment up to 12,000 kg (26,000 lb). To facilitate the loading of cargo, a winch was mounted on the ceiling of the cargo hold with a capacity of 3,000 kg (6,600 lb). It could carry either 120 troops, 96 fully loaded paratroopers or 64 standard parachute loads. As an aerial ambulance it could carry 31 stretchers and four medical attendants.

== Operational history ==
Construction of the first prototype was quite prolonged; the aircraft was not finished until November 1949, with its first flight taking place on 21 January 1950. It finished its manufacturer's trials the following May, but Tupolev decided not to submit it for the State acceptance trials as the Soviet Air Force had already decided that it would be cheaper to rely on its existing transports and to modify Tu-4 bombers for the cargo role. The prototype was used by the MAP (Russian: Ministerstvo Aviatsionnoy Promyshlennosti – Ministry of Aviation Industry) until it crashed in October 1954.

== Specifications ==
Data from The Osprey Encyclopedia of Russian Aircraft 1875-1995

General characteristics

- Crew: 6
- Length: 35.61 m (116 ft 10 in)
- Wingspan: 43.83 m (143 ft 10 in)
- Height: 9.05 m (29 ft 8 in)
- Wing area: 167.2 m^{2} (1,800 sq ft)
- Empty weight: 37,810 kg (83,357 lb)
- Gross weight: 56,660 kg (124,914 lb)
- Max takeoff weight: 65,400 kg (144,182 lb)
- Powerplant: 4 × Shvetsov ASh-73TKFN 18-cylinder air-cooled radial piston engines, 1,980 kW (2,650 hp) each
- Propellers: 4-bladed constant-speed propellers

Performance

- Maximum speed: 545 km/h (339 mph, 294 kn)
- Range: 4,140 km (2,570 mi, 2,240 nmi)
- Service ceiling: 9,500 m (31,200 ft)
- Wing loading: 338.9 kg/m^{2} (69.4 lb/sq ft)
- Power/mass: 0.1395 kW/kg (0.0849 hp/lb)

Armament

- Guns: 7 x 20 mm Berezin B-20 cannon (planned)

== See also ==
Related development

- Boeing B-29 Superfortress
- Tupolev Tu-4
- Tupolev Tu-70
- Tupolev Tu-80
- Tupolev Tu-85

Aircraft of comparable role, configuration, and era

- Boeing C-97 Stratofreighter
