= Tupolev Tu-4 =

Soviet strategic bomber aircraft, copy of B-29

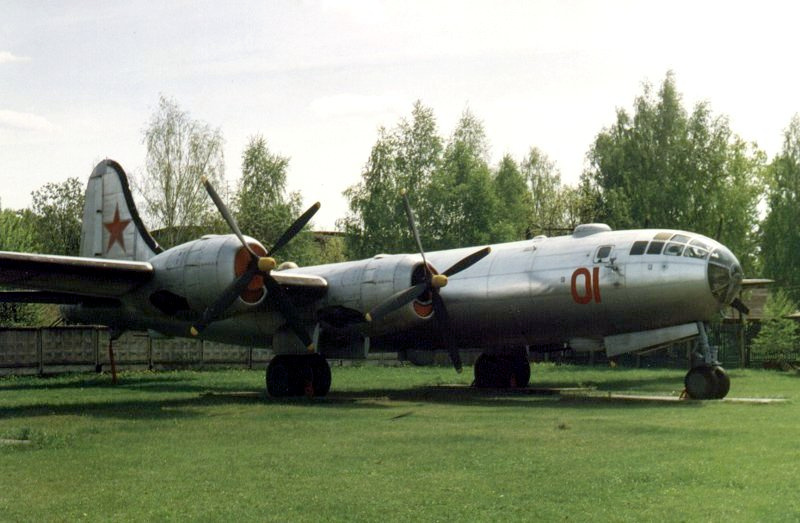

General information
- Type: Strategic bomber
- National origin: Soviet Union
- Manufacturer: Tupolev
- Status: Retired
- Primary users: Soviet Air Force PLA Air Force
- Number built: 847

History
- Manufactured: 1949–1952
- Introduction date: 1949
- First flight: 19 May 1947
- Retired: 1988 (China)
- Developed from: Boeing B-29 Superfortress
- Variants: Tupolev Tu-70; Tupolev Tu-75
- Developed into: Tupolev Tu-80; Tupolev Tu-85
- Successors: Tupolev Tu-16

The Tupolev Tu-4 (Russian: Туполев Ту-4; NATO reporting name: Bull) is a piston-engined Soviet strategic bomber that served the Soviet Air Force from the late 1940s to the mid-1960s. The aircraft was a copy of the American Boeing B-29 Superfortress, having been reverse-engineered from seized aircraft that had made emergency landings in the USSR.

== Design and development ==
Toward the end of World War II, the Soviet Union saw the need for a strategic bombing capability similar to that of the Western Allies. The Soviet VVS air arm had the locally designed Petlyakov Pe-8 four-engined "heavy" in service at the start of the war, but besides suffering complicated engines, only 93 had been built by the end of the war and the type had become obsolete. The U.S. regularly conducted bombing raids on Japan from distant Pacific forward bases using B-29 Superfortresses. Joseph Stalin ordered the development of a comparable bomber.

The U.S. twice refused to supply the Soviet Union with B-29s under Lend Lease. However, on four occasions during 1944, individual B-29s made emergency landings in Soviet territory and one crashed after the crew bailed out. In accordance with the Soviet–Japanese Neutrality Pact, the Soviets were neutral in the Pacific War and so the bombers were interned and kept by the Soviets. Despite Soviet neutrality, the U.S. demanded the return of the bombers, but were refused. Three repairable B-29s were flown to Moscow and delivered to the Tupolev OKB. One B-29 was dismantled, the second was used for flight tests and training, and the third was left as a standard for cross-reference. The aircraft included one Boeing-Wichita –5-BW, two Boeing-Wichita –15-BWs and the wreckage of one Boeing-Renton –1-BN, comprising three different models from two different production lines, at Wichita and Renton. Only one of the four had deicing boots, as would be used on the Tu-4. The fourth B-29 was returned to the US along with its crew with the end of the Soviet-Japanese peace. The Soviets declared war on Japan two days after the atomic bombing of Hiroshima, in accordance with the Yalta Agreement.

Stalin told Tupolev to duplicate the Superfortress in as short a time as possible instead of continuing with his own comparable ANT-64/Tu-10. The reverse-engineering effort involved 900 factories and research institutes, which finished the design work during the first year, and 105,000 drawings were made. By the end of the second year, the Soviet industry would produce twenty copies of the aircraft, ready for state acceptance trials.

The Soviet Union used the metric system and so sheet aluminium in thicknesses matching the B-29's U.S. customary measurements was unavailable. The corresponding metric-gauge metal was of different thicknesses. Alloys and other materials new to the Soviet Union had to be brought into production. Extensive re-engineering had to take place to compensate for the differences, and Soviet official strength margins had to be decreased to avoid further redesign. Despite those challenges, the prototype Tu-4 weighed only 340 kg (750 lb) more than the B-29, a difference of less than 1%.

The engineers and suppliers of components were under pressure from Tupolev, Stalin, and the government to create an exact clone of the original B-29 to facilitate production. Tupolev had to overcome substantial resistance to use equipment that was not only already in production but also sometimes superior to that found on the B-29s. Each alteration and every component made was scrutinized and was subject to a lengthy bureaucratic decision process. Kerber, then Tupolev's deputy, recalled in his memoirs that engineers needed authorization from a high-ranking general to use Soviet-made parachutes. Differences were limited to the aforementioned sheet-metal gauges, the engines, the defensive weapons, the radio (a later model used in lend-lease B-25s was used in place of the radio in the interned B-29s) and the identification friend or foe (IFF) system since the American IFF was obviously unsuitable. The Soviet Shvetsov ASh-73 engine was a development of the Wright R-1820 but was not otherwise related to the B-29's Wright R-3350. The ASh-73 also powered some of Aeroflot's remaining obsolescent Petlyakov Pe-8 airframes, a much-earlier Soviet four-engined heavy bomber, whose production was curtailed by higher-priority programs. The B-29's remote-controlled gun turrets were redesigned to accommodate the Soviet Nudelman NS-23, a harder-hitting and longer-ranged 23 mm (0.91 in) cannon. Additional changes were made as a result of problems encountered during testing related to engine and propeller failures, and equipment changes were made throughout the aircraft's service life.

The Tu-4 first flew on 19 May 1947 and was flown by test pilot Nikolai Rybko. Serial production started immediately, and the type would enter large-scale service by 1949. The aircraft was first displayed during a flyover on 3 August 1947 at the Tushino Aviation Day parade. At first, three aircraft flew over and the Western observers assumed that they were merely the three B-29 bombers which they knew had been diverted to the Soviet Union during World War II. Minutes later a fourth aircraft appeared, and the observers realized the Soviets had reverse-engineered the B-29.

Entry into service of the Tu-4 threw the U.S. Air Force into panic since the aircraft possessed sufficient range to attack Chicago or Los Angeles on a one-way mission, and that may have informed the maneuvers and air combat practice conducted by US and British air forces in 1948 involving fleets of B-29s. The tests were conducted by the RAF Central Fighter Establishment and co-operative US B-29 groups and involved demonstration of recommended methods of attack against B-29/Tu 4-type bombers using RAF Gloster Meteor and de Havilland Vampire jet fighters. The Soviets developed four different midair refueling systems to extend the bomber's range, but these were fitted to only a few aircraft, and only a small number of the final design were installed on operational aircraft before the Tu-4 was superseded by the Tu-16.

== Operational history ==
A total of 847 Tu-4s had been built when production ended in the Soviet Union in 1952, some of which went to China during the later 1950s. Many experimental variants were built and the experience launched the Soviet strategic bomber program. Tu-4s were withdrawn from Soviet service in the 1960s, being replaced by more advanced aircraft including the Tupolev Tu-16 jet bomber (starting in 1954) and the Tupolev Tu-95 turboprop bomber (starting in 1956). By the beginning of the 1960s, the only Tu-4s still operated by the Soviets were used for transport or airborne laboratory purposes. A Tu-4A was the first Soviet aircraft to drop a nuclear weapon, the RDS-3.

In Chinese service, the Tu-4 flew its only combat mission with the PLAAF when two Tu-4s were used to conduct bombing raids against Tibetan rebels embedded in monasteries in Lithang, Chathreng and Bathang in Sichuan during the Tibetan uprisings in 1956.

== Variants ==
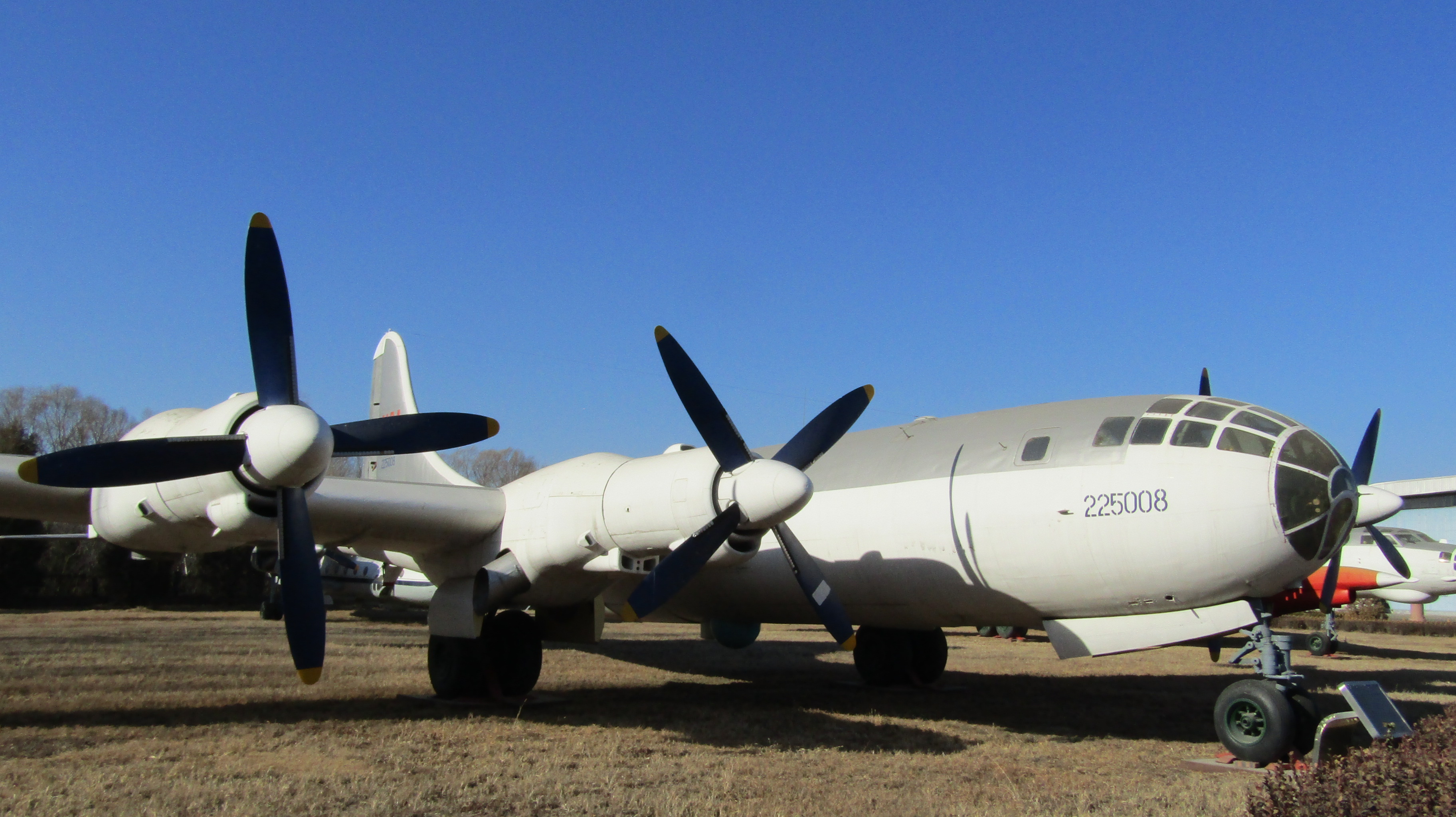
Tu-4 at China Aviation Museum

Tu-4
main production version, originally designated B-4

Tu-4 Variants without special designations:
Tu-4 ELINT and ECM
Tu-4 mothership for the DFS 346A.(Note:other DFS346 prototypes were carried by one of the Boeing B-29s interned during the war).
Tu-4 escort fighter mothership (Project Burlaki)
Tu-4 remotely controlled target drone converted from time expired bombers.
Tu-4 fuel carrier
Tu-4 in-flight refuelling testbeds (four different systems were trialled)
Tu-4 radiation reconnaissance aircraft
Tu-4 communications relay aircraft

Tu-4A
Nuclear capable bomber used to test Soviet RDS-1, RDS-3 and RDS-5 nuclear bombs. The standard Tu-4 was not capable of carrying these weapons.
Tu-4D
Troop transport (300 conversions). Also known as Tu-76.
Tu-4K/KS
Anti-shipping version, armed with KS-1 Komet missiles carried between the engines under the wings.
Tu-4LL
Engine testbed for the Mikulin AM-3 jet engine, the Ivchenko AI-20, Kuznetsov NK-4 and Kuznetsov 2TV-2F turboprop engines, the Dobrynin VD-3K radial engine and AV-28 contra-rotating propellers.
Tu-4NM
Drone launcher aircraft with Lavochkin La-17 unmanned aerial vehicles carried underwing
Tu-4R
Long-range reconnaissance.
Tu-4T
Paratroop transport (one example only)
Tu-4TRZhK
Liquid oxygen tanker aircraft.
Tu-4UShS
Navigational trainer.

ShR-1
Testbed for Myasishchev M-4 to develop a bicycle-type landing gear.
UR-1/-2
Testbed for Myasishchev M-4 powered controls.

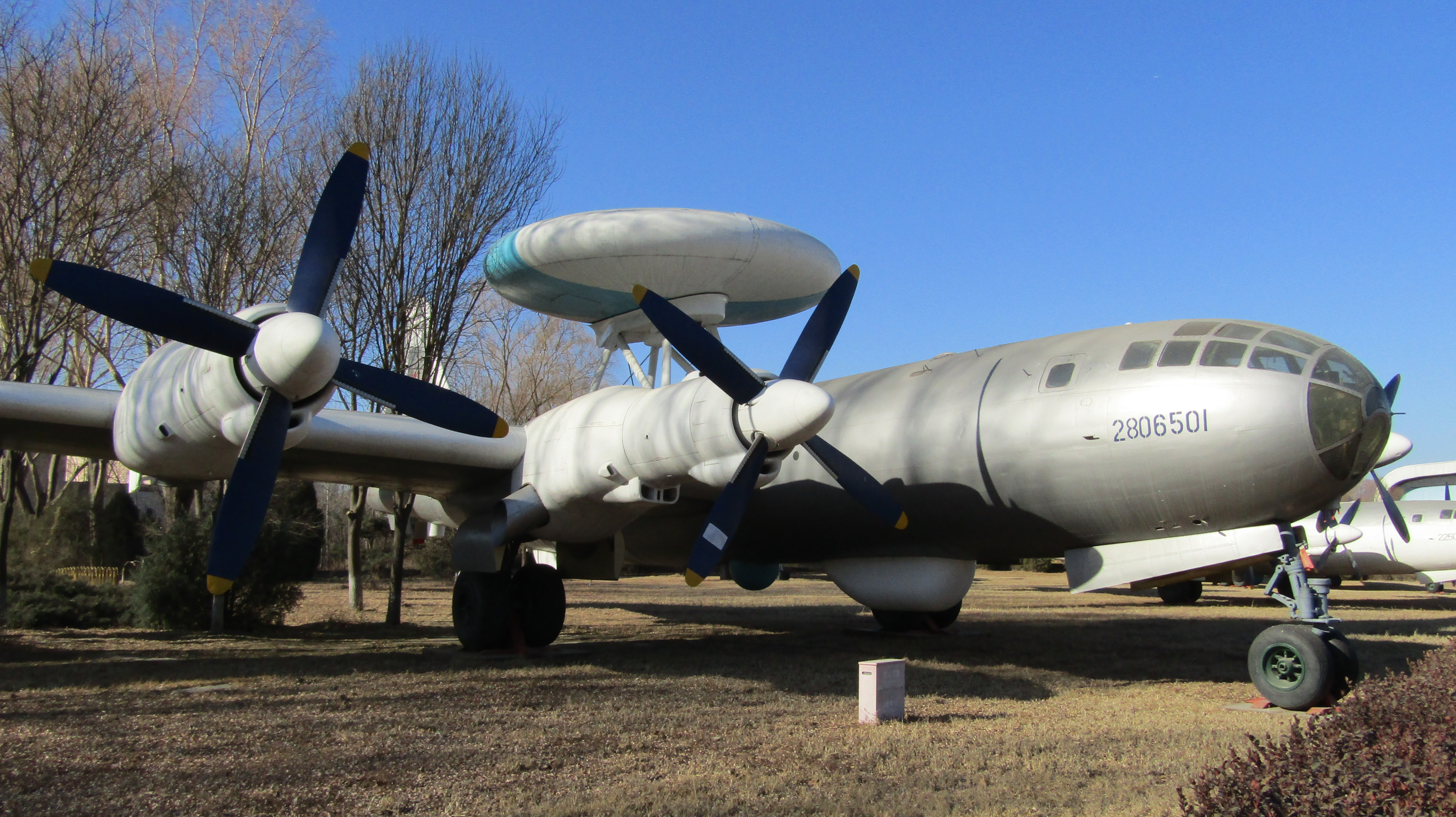
KJ-1 at China Aviation Museum, Beijing

Tu-4 AWACS
Chinese prototype with KJ-1 AEWC, airborne early warning and control radar and powered by Ivchenko AI-20K turboprop engines. Two converted to allow the Chinese to monitor US nuclear weapons tests in the Pacific.
Tu-70
Airliner, never reached mass production.
Tu-75
Cargo derivative, never reached mass production.
Tu-79
Tu-4 powered by M-49TK engines.
Tu-80
Long-range bomber development, never reached mass production.
Tu-85
Long-range bomber development, never reached mass production.
Tu-94
Tu-4 powered by Kuznetsov TV-2 turboprop engines.

== Operators ==
Soviet Union

- Soviet Air Force

The Soviet Air Force operated 847 Tupolev Tu-4 bombers between 1948 and early 1960, initially as long-range bombers. The first regiment to be re-equipped on the Tu-4 was the 185th Guards Aviation Regiment of the 13th Guards Bomber Aviation Division, stationed at Poltava Air Base in the Ukrainian SSR. The training of personnel was carried out in Kazan, at the 890th long-range bomber regiment, turned into a training unit. The pilots of the 890th Regiment had extensive experience flying American Boeing B-17 Flying Fortresses and Consolidated B-24 Liberator aircraft. In March 1949 the 52nd Guards Heavy Bomber Aviation Regiment received Tu-4s; the 121st Guards received Tu-4Rs in 1953.

In 1954 the Soviets began phasing out the Tu-4 as Tupolev Tu-16 bombers entered service and, beginning in 1956, to Tupolev Tu-95 bombers. Tu-4s withdrawn from front line units were used for transport duties.

China

- People's Liberation Army Air Force

On 28 February 1953, Joseph Stalin gave China ten Tu-4 heavy bombers, and in 1960 two additional aircraft configured as navigational trainers arrived in Beijing. 11 Tu-4s were refitted with AI-20K turboprop engines between 1970 and 1973. The last PLAAF Tu-4 was retired in 1988.

In 1969, China developed its first airborne early warning aircraft based on the Tu-4 airframe. The project was named KJ-1 and mounted a Type 843 rotodome above the fuselage of the aircraft. However, due to clutter noise the KJ-1 failed to meet the PLAAF's requirements. The project was canceled in 1979 although further projects were proposed based on Tu-4 platform. The airframe was already obsolete however and the Tu-4 was ruled out for future developments. The single prototype is displayed at the PLAAF museum north of Beijing.

== Survivors ==
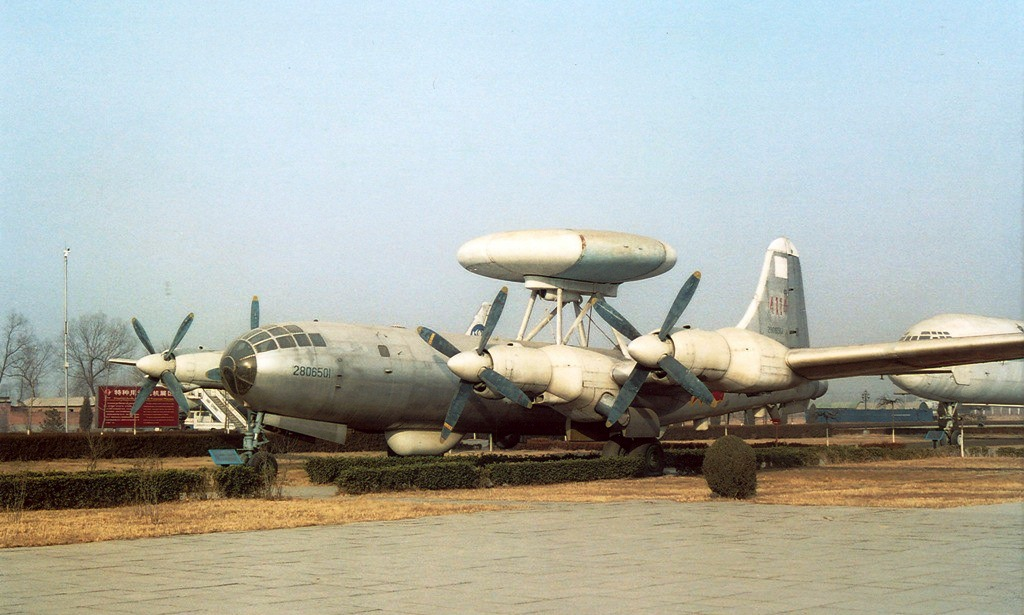
China Aviation Museum, KJ-1.

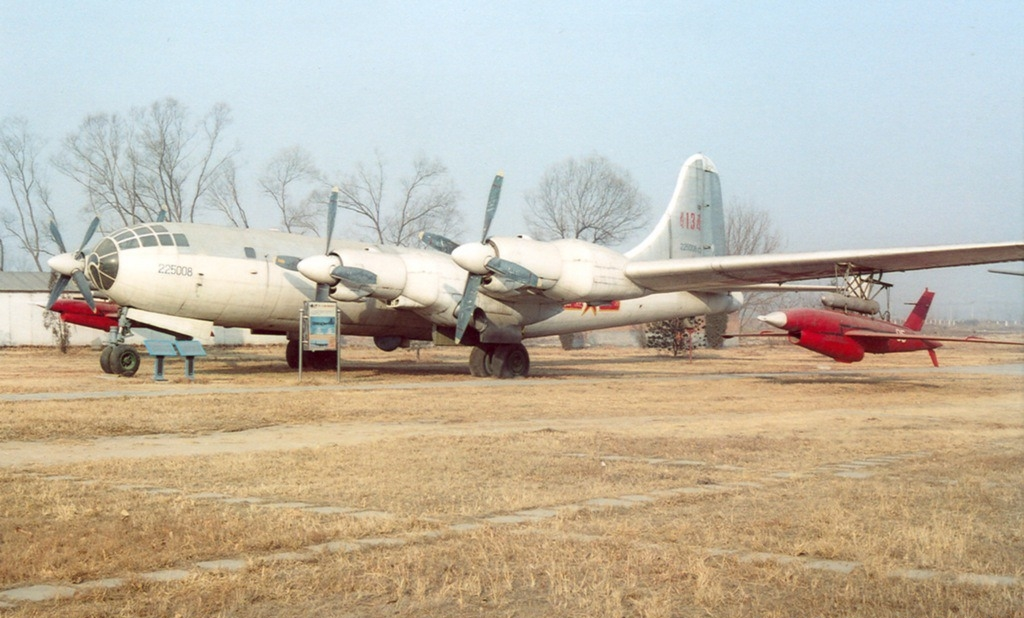
China Aviation Museum, Tupolev Tu-4.

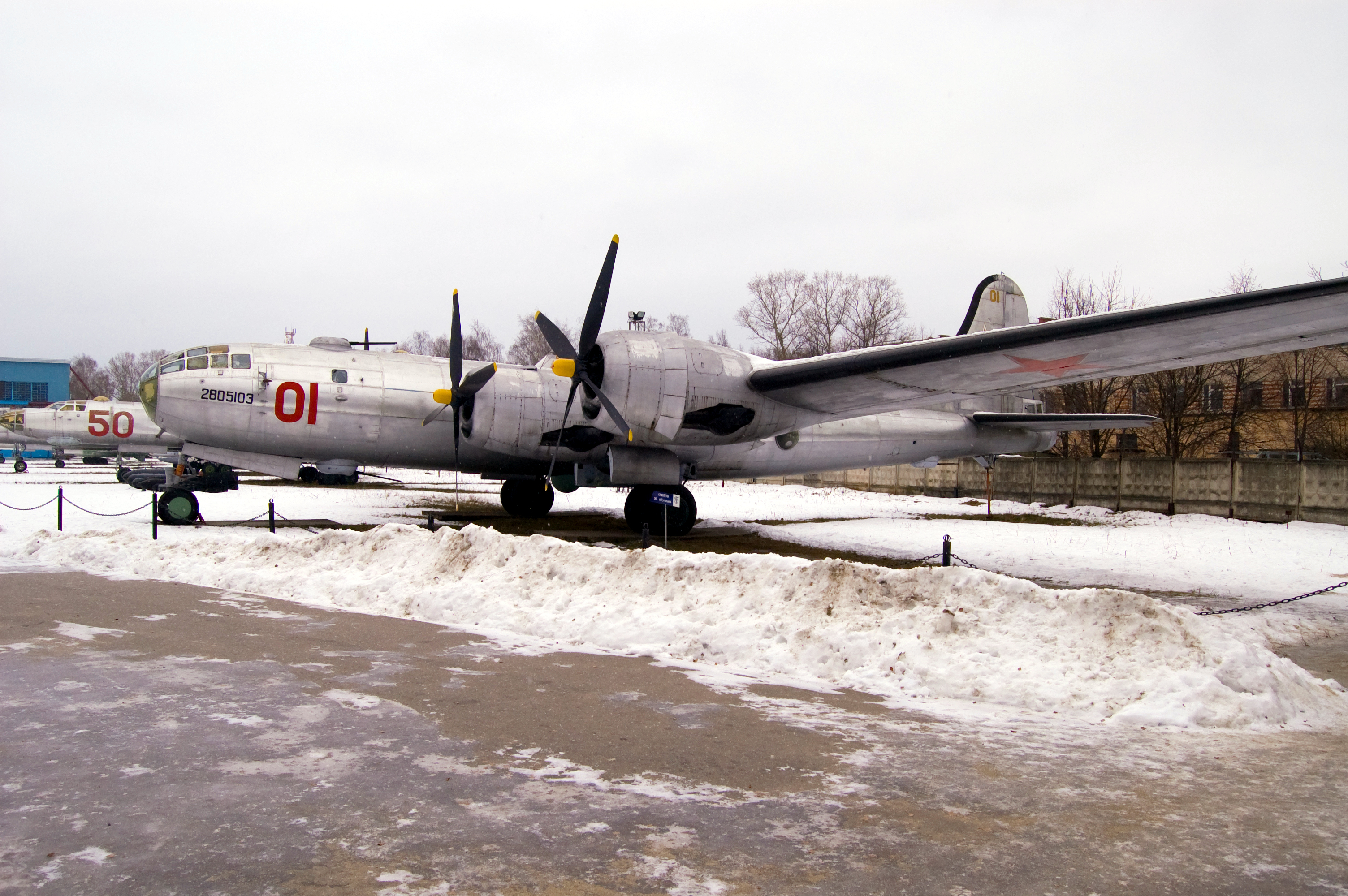
Tupolev Tu-4 at Monino

Tu-4 4114 (c/n 2805601), ex-KJ-1 AEWC, "4114"
Stored at Datangshan, China
Tu-4 4134 (c/n 2205008), "4134"
Stored at Datangshan, China
Tu-4 unknown (c/n 2805103), "01"
Stored at the Central Air Force Museum, Monino, Russia

== Specifications (Tu-4) ==
Data from Tupolev Tu-4 Soviet Superfortress.

General characteristics

- Crew: 11
- Length: 30.18 m (99 ft 0 in)
- Wingspan: 43.05 m (141 ft 3 in)
- Height: 8.46 m (27 ft 9 in)
- Wing area: 161.7 m^{2} (1,741 sq ft)
- Aspect ratio: 11.5
- Empty weight: 36,850 kg (81,240 lb)
- Gross weight: 47,850 kg (105,491 lb)
- Max takeoff weight: 55,600 kg (122,577 lb) – 63,600 kg (140,200 lb)
- Powerplant: 4 × Shvetsov ASh-73TK 18-cyl. air-cooled radial piston engines, 1,790 kW (2,400 hp) each
- Propellers: 4-bladed V3-A3 or V3B-A5, 5.06 m (16 ft 7 in) diameter

Performance

- Maximum speed: 558 km/h (347 mph, 301 kn) at 10,250 m (33,630 ft)
- Range: 5,400 km (3,400 mi, 2,900 nmi) at 3,000 m (9,800 ft) with 63,600 kg (140,200 lb) take-off weight including 3,000 kg (6,600 lb) of bombs and 10% fuel reserves
- Service ceiling: 11,200 m (36,700 ft)
- Rate of climb: 4.6 m/s (910 ft/min) at 1,000 m (3,300 ft)
- Time to altitude: 5,000 m (16,000 ft) in 18.2 minutes
- Wing loading: 400 kg/m^{2} (82 lb/sq ft)
- Power/mass: 0.11 kW/kg

Armament

- Guns: 10 × 23 mm (0.91 in) Nudelman-Suranov NS-23 aircraft cannon, two cannon in each of the four turrets and two cannon in the tail barbette
- Missiles: 2 × KS-1 Komet standoff missiles (Tu-4K only; these anti-ship missiles resembled a scaled-down MiG-15)
- Bombs: 6 × 1,000 kg (2,200 lb) bombs or 1 x RDS-1, RDS-3 or RDS-5 nuclear fission bomb (Tu-4A only)

== See also ==
Related development

- Boeing B-29 Superfortress
- Boeing B-50 Superfortress
- Tupolev Tu-70
- Tupolev Tu-75
- Tupolev Tu-80
- Tupolev Tu-85

Aircraft of comparable role, configuration, and era

- Avro Lincoln
- Consolidated B-32 Dominator
- Messerschmitt Me 264

Related lists

- List of bomber aircraft
- List of military aircraft of the Soviet Union and the CIS
