= Yakovlev Yak-17 =

1948 Soviet jet fighter

Yak-17
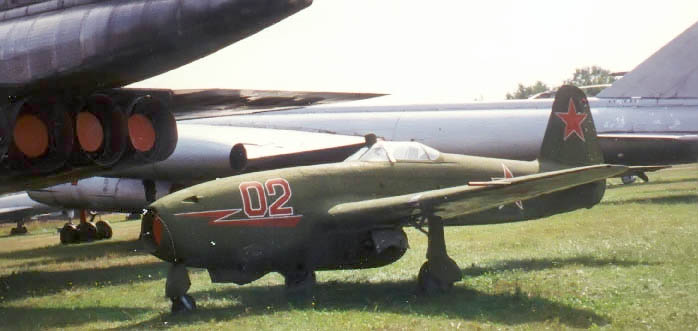
- Yak-17 in the Russian Central Air Force Museum, Monino Airfield

General information
- Type: Fighter aircraft
- Manufacturer: Tbilisi Aircraft Manufacturing
- Designer: Yakovlev
- Primary users: Soviet Air Forces Polish Air Force; Romanian Air Force; People's Liberation Army Air Force
- Number built: 430

History
- Manufactured: 1948–1949
- Introduction date: 1948
- First flight: June 1947
- Retired: Early 1960s
- Developed from: Yakovlev Yak-15
- Variant: Yakovlev Yak-23

The Yakovlev Yak-17 (Russian: Яковлев Як-17; USAF/DOD designation Type 16, NATO reporting name Feather) is an early Soviet jet fighter. It was developed from the Yak-15, the primary difference being tricycle landing gear. The trainer version, known as the Yak-17UTI (NATO reporting name Magnet), was the only Soviet jet trainer of the 1940s. Both aircraft were exported in small numbers and the Yak-17 was soon replaced by the far superior Mikoyan-Gurevich MiG-15 beginning in 1950.

== Design and development ==
After the state acceptance trials of the Yak-15 in May 1947 recommended that the aircraft be modified with a tricycle landing gear more suitable for jet-powered aircraft, the Yakovlev design bureau began design of the Yak-15U or Yak-15U-RD-10 (uloochshenny - improved).

The main gear had to be redesigned to place the wheels behind the aircraft's center of gravity. The main gear was moved behind the front spar, and when retracted filled most of the space between the spars. This caused a major redesign of the fuel tanks and reduced their capacity to just 680 liters (150 gallons). This necessitated the addition of two 200-liter (44 imp gal; 53 U.S. gal) drop tanks, which hung under the tip of each wing. The addition of the tip tanks required a redesign of the structure of the wing so that the aircraft could still maintain a load bearing of 12g. The vertical stabilizer was enlarged and a periscope was also added above the windscreen on most series aircraft. Armament, systems, and equipment were virtually unchanged.

Production began in 1948. Total production of all Yak-15 and Yak-17 variants was 717.

== Operational history ==
The Yak-17 was first publicly displayed at the Soviet Aviation Day of 1949, at Tushino Airfield.

In operation, the Yak-17 had most of the same faults as its predecessor, including relatively low speed and range, and an unreliable engine (still based upon the German Junkers Jumo 004) with a complicated starting procedure. On the other hand, its handling was very simple, and similar to popular propeller fighters such as the Yak-3 and Yak-9. This made it an excellent transitional machine to jet fighters. As a result, the trainer version Yak-17UTI accounted for the majority of production, and almost all series-built Yak-17s were of this tandem, dual-control trainer version, which filled an important need in all Soviet air arms.

Surviving Yak-17s can be viewed at the Central Air Force Museum at Monino, outside of Moscow and the Prague Aviation Museum at Kbely Airport, near Prague, Czech Republic. Surviving Yak-17UTIs include one example at the Polish Aviation Museum in Kraków and the Chinese Aviation Museum, near Beijing.

== Variants ==
- Yak-15U (Yak-15U-RD-10): Improved Yak-15 with tricycle undercarriage and drop tanks, became the prototype of the Yak-17 proper.
- UTI Yak-17-RD10 (Yak-21T): (No relation to the earlier Yak-17-RD10) Two-seat trainer version of the Yak-15U with long greenhouse canopy over tandem cockpits and tricycle undercarriage.
- Yak-21T: (T for Tryokhkolyosnoye shassee - "tricycle undercarriage") Alternative designation of the UTI Yak-17-RD10. Unrelated to the earlier Yak-21.
- Yak-17: Production fighters with tricycle undercarriage.
- Yak-17UTI: The most-produced variant of the Yak-17, the Yak-17UTI was a tandem-seat, dual-control trainer. Fuel capacity was greatly reduced, owing to the elimination of the wingtip tanks. Initially it was planned to include a single UBS machine gun, but this was omitted on series-produced aircraft. In the U.S., this aircraft was known as the "Type 26", and given the ASCC reporting name "Magnet".

== Operators ==
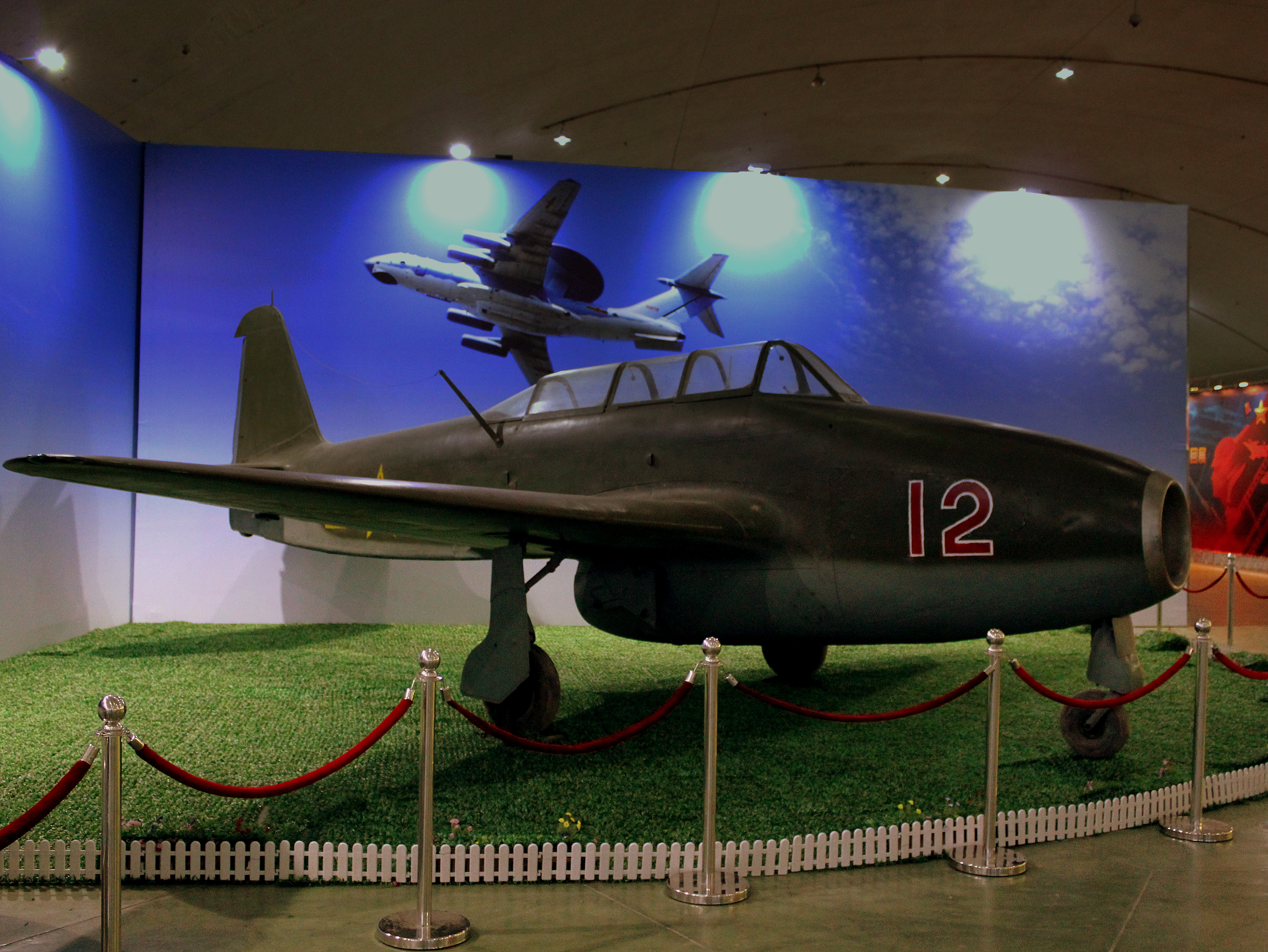
Yak-17UTI in the Datangshan Aviation Museum, Beijing

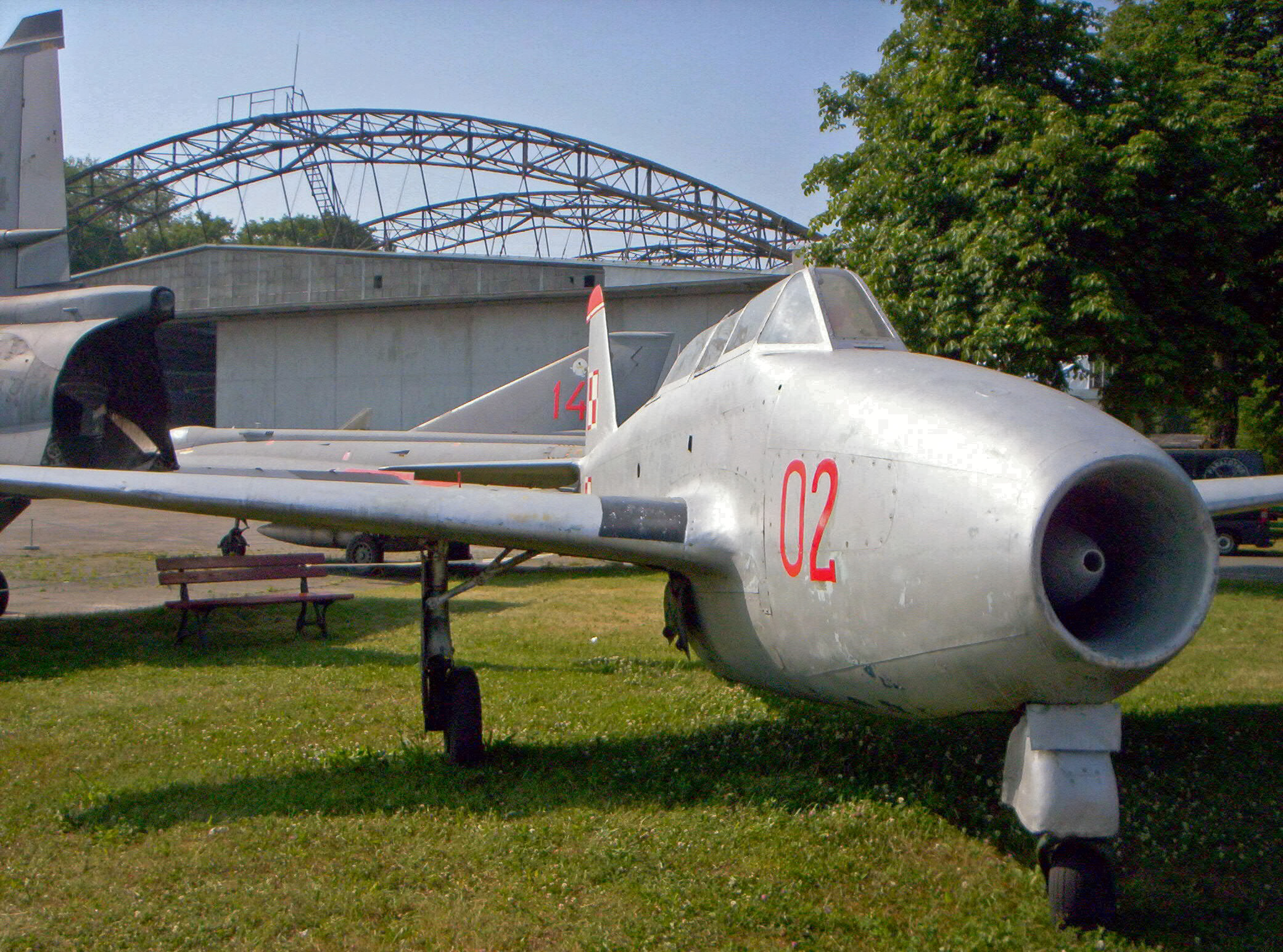
Yak-17UTI in the Polish Aviation Museum

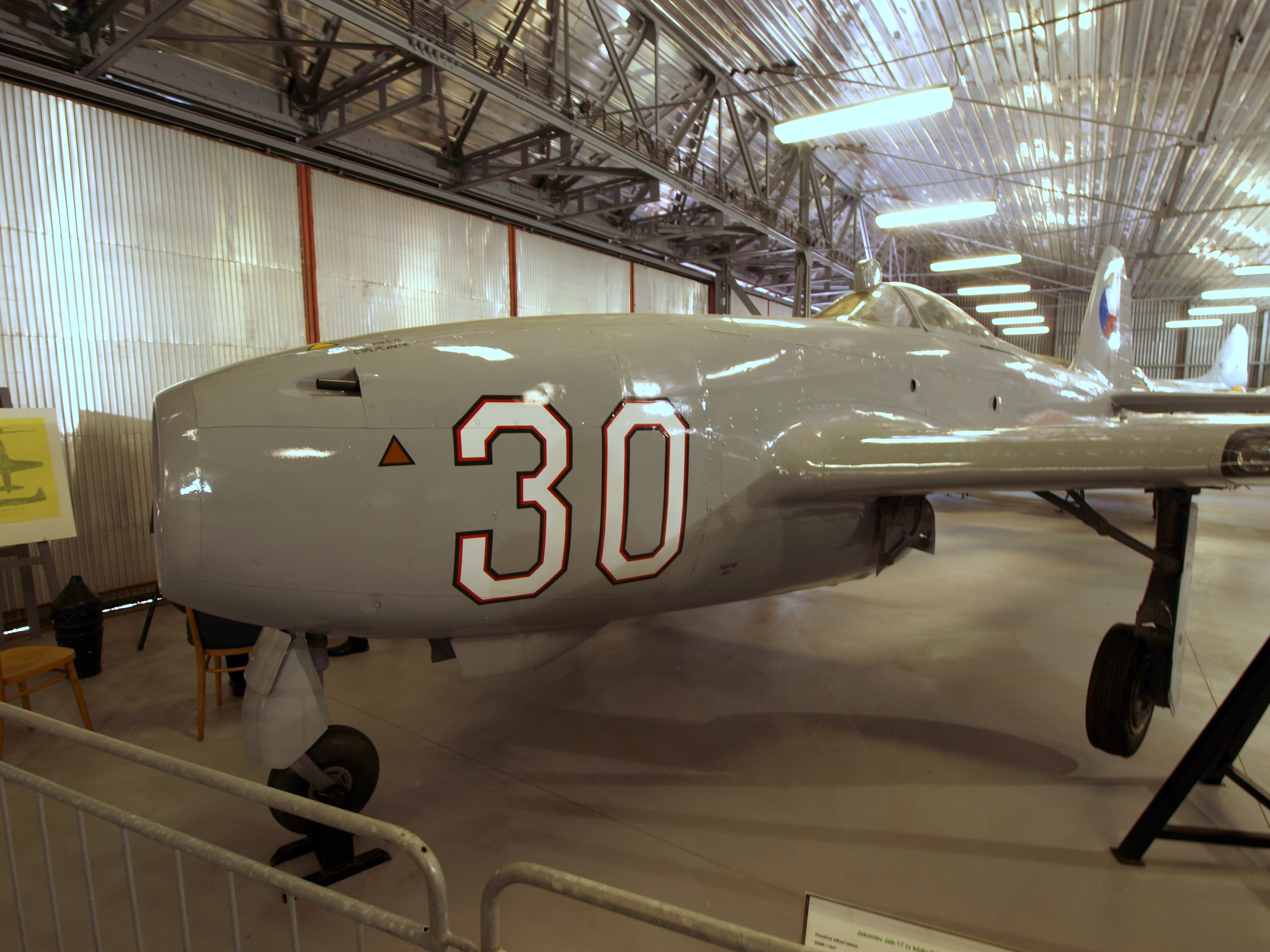
Yak-17 in Prague Aviation Museum, Kbely, Prague, Czech Republic

Bulgaria

- Bulgarian Air Force operated a small number of Yak-17UTI between 1951-1954.

China

- People's Liberation Army Air Force (PLAAF) received one Yak-17UTI for training MiG-9 pilots. Imported 43 Yak-17UTI in 1950-1951. Later they were used when converting the former La-9 and La-11 pilots to fly MiG-15.

Czechoslovakia

- Czechoslovak Air Force tested one Yak-17.

Poland

- Polish Air Force operated three Yak-17 (transcribed as Jak-17) and 11 Yak-17UTI (known as Jak-17UTI or Jak-17W) between 1950 and 1955.
- Instytut Lotnictwa received one Yak-17 from Polish Air Force and used it with civilian markings SP-GLM for tests between 1957 and 1960.

Romania

- Romanian Air Force operated nine Yak-17UTIs as trainers for the Yak-23s from 1951 until 1958.

Soviet Union

- Soviet Air Force operated Yak-17 aircraft from 1948 into the early 1950s.

== Specifications (Yak-17) ==
Data from Early Soviet Jet Fighters

General characteristics

- Crew: 1
- Length: 8.78 m (28 ft 10 in)
- Wingspan: 9.2 m (30 ft 2 in)
- Wing area: 14.85 m^{2} (159.8 sq ft)
- Empty weight: 2,081 kg (4,588 lb)
- Gross weight: 3,323 kg (7,326 lb)
- Fuel capacity: 553 kg (1,219 lb) (internal), 884 kg (1,949 lb) (with drop tanks)
- Powerplant: 1 × Klimov RD-10A axial-flow turbojet, 9.8 kN (2,200 lbf) thrust

Performance

- Maximum speed: 744 km/h (462 mph, 402 kn) at 4,250 m (13,940 ft)
- Range: 395 km (245 mi, 213 nmi)
- Ferry range: 710 km (440 mi, 380 nmi) with drop tanks at altitude of 8,000 m (26,000 ft)
- Service ceiling: 11,900 m (39,000 ft)
- Rate of climb: 17.6 m/s (3,460 ft/min) at sea level
- Time to altitude: 5,000 m (16,000 ft) in 6.5 minutes
- Wing loading: 189 kg/m^{2} (39 lb/sq ft)
- Thrust/weight: 0.31

Armament

- Guns: 2 × 23 mm (0.91 in) Nudelman-Suranov NS-23K autocannon with 105 rounds per gun

== See also ==
Related development

- Yak-23

Aircraft of comparable role, configuration, and era

- Lavochkin La-152
- Lavochkin La-156

== Bibliography ==
- Gordon, Yefim & Kommissarov, Dmitry. Early Soviet Jet Fighters. Manchester, UK: Hikoki Publications, 2014. ISBN 978-1-90210935-0.
- Green, William & Swanborough, Gordon. "The Complete Book of Fighters". London: Salamander Books. 1994. ISBN 1-85833-777-1.
- Gunston, Bill. The Osprey Encyclopedia of Russian Aircraft 1875–1995. London: Osprey, 1995. ISBN 1-85532-405-9.
- Mikolajczuk, Marian. Yakovlev Yak-23: The First Yakovlev Jet Fighters. Sandomirez, Poland: Stratus, 2008. ISBN 978-83-89450-54-8.
