= Soviet air show =

In the life of Soviet Union, air shows were a highly regarded type of parade, almost always of military nature. They happened on various occasions and anniversaries, in many locations across the country. A notable air show was the Tushino Air Show held annually in August.

== Dates ==
=== Soviet Air Fleet Day ===
The most frequent date of air shows was the Soviet Air Fleet Day (Russian: День Воздушного Флота). It was also known as the Soviet Air Forces Day (Russian: День Военно-воздушных Сил), or Soviet Aviation Day. It was established in 1933 and was most usually held on the third Sunday of August, weather permitting. The initial exhibition on 18 August 1933, was a result of Yakov Alksnis initiative, and was held in Khodynka Aerodrome (the Central Moscow Aerodrome), but since the next year the show became located on Tushino airfield near Moscow, where it remained for entire decades. In 1937, the parade was attended by nearly a million people, observing the masses of aircraft spelling in the sky "LENIN", "STALIN" and "СССР". The celebrations repeated until the fall of Soviet Union, and continue in Russia (location is now Zhukovskiy airport, see MAKS airshow).

=== May Day ===
1 May was dedicated to multitude of parades throughout the Soviet Union. They often included large-scale flypasts.

=== Other ===
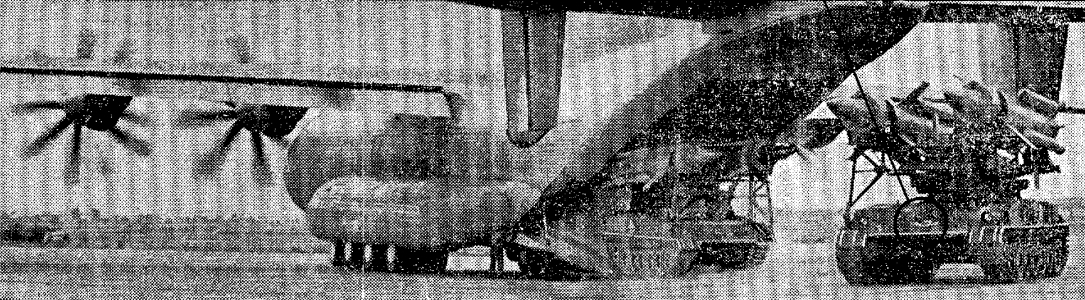
An-22 unloading 2K11 Krug missiles, Moscow air show, July 1967

The Soviet Air Fleet Day became primarily associated with Soviet Air Forces (VVS), so a separate day has been established for Soviet Air Defense Forces (PVO) a second arm of Soviet military that employed numerous fighter squadrons. It was called Soviet Air Defence Forces Day (Russian: День войск противовоздушной обороны СССР), occurred on the second Sunday of April, and was celebrated with air parades of lesser scale.

The October Revolution anniversary usually included air parade, but as it was held on 7 November, the aircraft were often cancelled because of weather conditions. The same problem pertained to 19 November, the Soviet Rocket Forces and Artillery Day.

Notably, the 50th anniversary of October revolution air show was held in the summer, on 9 July 1967 at Domodedovo airport. In an unprecedented display of air power, it featured twelve new types or variants of military aircraft, and prompted concern in the West, especially with reveal of the MiG-25, which appeared to be better than current U.S. fighters and influenced the F-X program and therefore the McDonnell Douglas F-15 Eagle.

== Notable first appearances ==
The Soviet air shows conveyed more than entertainment. In the atmosphere of harshly enforced clandestinity, these air shows were frequently the main source of information about the recent aviation achievements of Soviet design bureaus (OKBs). Both Eastern and Western public opinion benefited from it, as well as foreign military intelligence.

Year	Month Day	Location	New fighters (Soviet designation)	New bombers (Soviet designation)	Other new aircraft	Comments	Reference
1947	3 August	Tushino airfield	Yak-19, La-150, La-156, La-160, Su-9, Su-11	Tu-4, Tu-77	-	new jet designs	
1950	1 May	Tushino airfield	-	Il-18	Ka-10, Mi-1	-	
1952	1 May	Tushino airfield	-	-	Mi-4	-	
1954	1 May	Tushino airfield	-	M-4, Tu-16	-	-	
1955		Tushino airfield	MiG-19, Yak-25	Tupolev Tu-95	Yak-24	-	
1956	24 June	Tushino airfield	MiG-21, Su-7B, Su-9	Yak-26		-	
1961	9 July	Tushino airfield	Tu-28	M-50, Tu-22, Yak-28	Be-10, Be-12, Ka-20, Ka-22, Ka-25, Mi-8, Mi-10	-	
1967	9 July	Domodedovo Airport	MiG-23, MiG-25, Su-11, Su-15, Su-17, STOL aircraft (MiG, Su, Yak-36)	-	-	major impact in the West	
1971	May	Vnukovo Airport	-	-	Tu-144, Tu-154, Il-76, Il-62M, Tu-134A, Yak-40, B-12	civil aviation exhibition	
1972	-	Domodedovo Airport	-	Sukhoi T-4	-	-	

== See also ==
- Air show
- Flypast
- Military parade
- MAKS (air show), the current biennial Russian air show
