= Yakovlev Yak-15 =

Soviet first-generation turbojet fighter

Yak-15
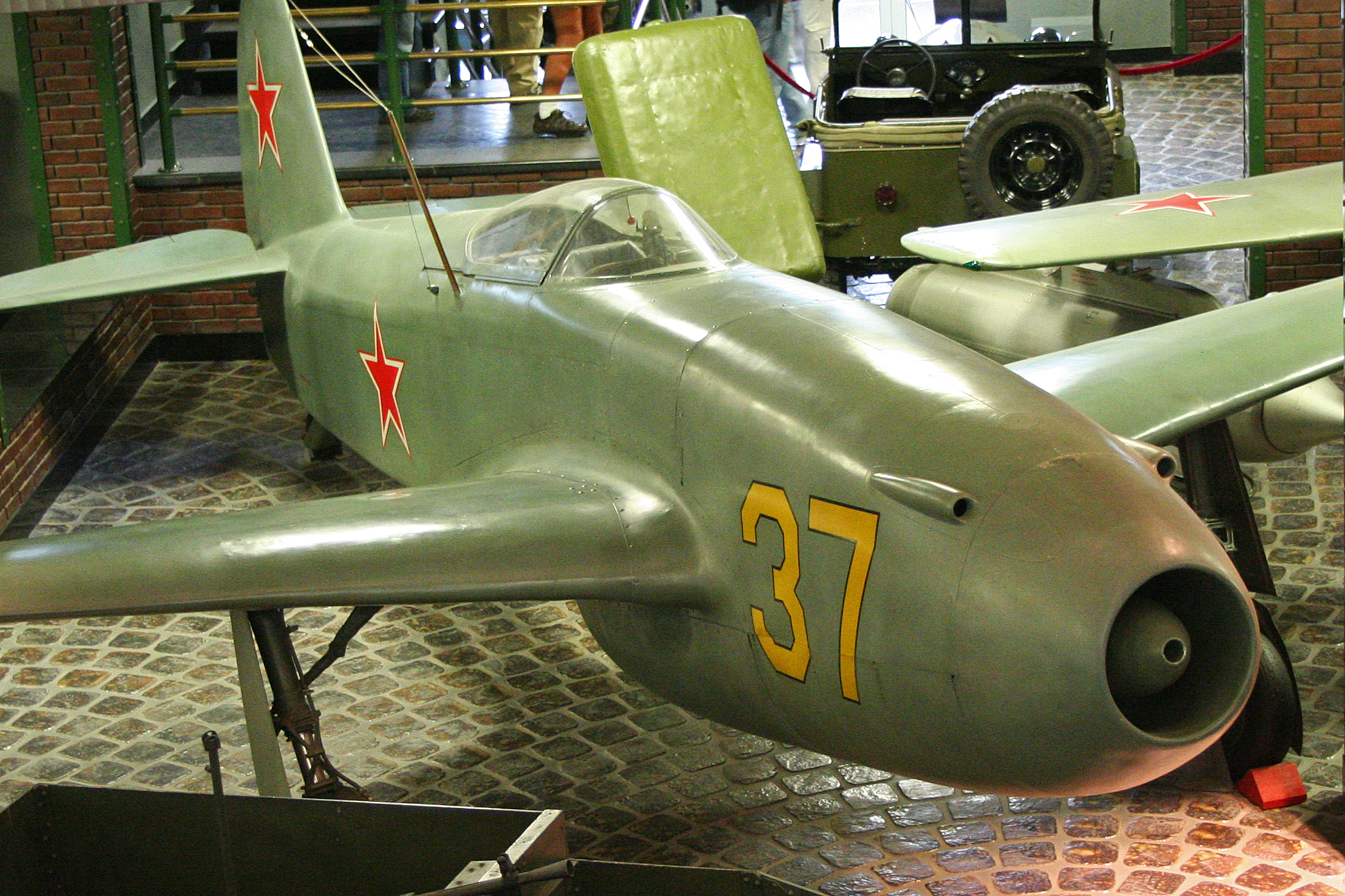
- The only surviving Yak-15, displayed at the Vadim Zadorozhny Technical Museum, Moscow (2012)

General information
- Type: Fighter
- Manufacturer: Yakovlev
- Primary user: Soviet Air Force
- Number built: 280

History
- Manufactured: 1946–47
- Introduction date: 1947
- First flight: 24 April 1946
- Developed from: Yakovlev Yak-3
- Developed into: Yakovlev Yak-17

The Yakovlev Yak-15 (Russian: Яковлев Як-15; NATO reporting name: Feather, USAF/DOD designation Type 2) is a first-generation Soviet turbojet fighter developed by the Yakovlev design bureau (OKB) immediately after World War II. The main fuselage was that of Yakovlev Yak-3 piston-engine fighter modified to mount a reverse-engineered German Junkers Jumo 004 engine. The Yak-15 and the Swedish Saab 21R were the only two jets to be successfully converted from piston-power to enter production. 280 aircraft were built in 1947. Although nominally a fighter, it was mainly used to qualify piston-engine-experienced pilots to fly jets.

== Design ==
=== Development and description ===
On 9 April 1945, the Council of People's Commissars ordered the Yakovlev OKB to develop a single-seat jet fighter to be equipped with a single German Jumo 004 engine. To save time, Yakovlev based the new design (known as the Yak-3-Jumo or Yak-Jumo) on the latest version of his successful Yakovlev Yak-3 piston-engined fighter. The piston engine was removed and the jet engine was mounted underneath the forward fuselage so that its exhaust exited underneath the middle of the fuselage. To protect the fuselage, a steel heatshield was added to its bottom. The deeper forward part of the fuselage caused the configuration of the aircraft to resemble a "pod-and-boom". Very few changes were made to the metal fuselage other than at the aircraft's nose. This was recontoured to accommodate the armament of two 23-millimeter (0.91 in) Nudelman-Suranov NS-23 autocannon, an additional fuel tank above the engine and the engine itself. No changes were made to the wings other than the elimination of the air intakes for the oil cooler and the bending of the front wing spar into an inverted U-shape to clear the engine. The vertical stabilizer was slightly enlarged, but the tailplane was unmodified. The conventional landing gear was also unmodified other than the tailwheel which now used several steel leaf springs as shock absorbers. The Yak-Jumo carried a total of 590 kilograms (1,300 lb) of fuel.

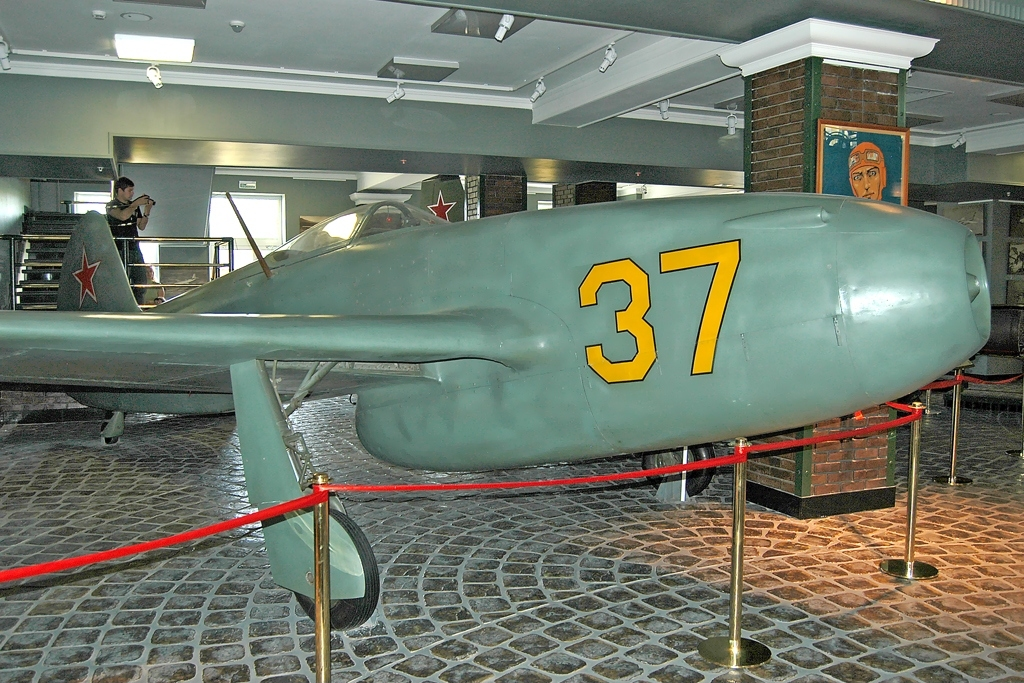
Yak-15 forward fuselage and engine

Taxi tests began in October 1945, but the heatshield proved to be too short and the heat from the engine exhaust melted the duralumin skin of the rear fuselage as well as the rubber tire of the tailwheel. Modifications to rectify the problems took until late December. By this time a second prototype had been completed with a solid steel tailwheel and an enlarged tailplane. After a few taxiing tests, it was transferred to the Central Aerohydrodynamic Institute (TsAGI) for full-scale windtunnel testing that lasted until February 1946. On the 26th of that month, the Council of People's Commissars issued requirements that the aircraft should have a maximum speed of 770 km/h (480 mph) at sea level and a speed of 850 km/h (530 mph) at an altitude of 5,000 meters (16,400 ft). It should be able to climb to that altitude in 4 1/2 minutes or less and it should have a range of 500 kilometers (310 mi) at 90% of maximum speed. Two prototypes were to be ready for flight testing on 1 September.

The Mikoyan-Gurevich OKB was developing the MiG-9 at the same time. According to aviation historians Bill Gunston and Yefim Gordon, representatives from Yakovlev and Mikoyan-Gurevich tossed a coin on 24 April 1946 to determine which aircraft would be the first Soviet jet to fly. Yakovlev lost and the Yak-Jumo made one circuit of the airfield before landing. The manufacturer's flight testing of the aircraft was completed on 22 June, but its early success caused the Council of Ministers to issue a new requirement on 29 April for two aircraft powered by the Soviet-built RD-10 engine (known as the Yak-15, Yak-15RD10 or Yak-RD). Aside from the new engine, the requirement differed from the previous one only in a range of 700 kilometers (430 mi) at optimum cruise speed and a reduction of the maximum ceiling to 14,000 meters (45,930 ft). Two prototypes were ordered to be available for flight testing on 1 September 1946.

Yakovlev was able to adapt the two existing prototypes to the RD-10 with little trouble and one aircraft participated in the August 1946 Tushino flypast. The day after the aerial display, Joseph Stalin summoned Artem Mikoyan and Aleksandr Yakovlev to his office and ordered that each OKB build 15 aircraft to participate in the 7 November parade in Red Square commemorating the anniversary of the October Revolution. Factory No. 31 in Tbilisi was chosen to build the new aircraft because it was still building conventional Yak-3s and could easily switch to the jet fighter. All 15 aircraft were built before the deadline, although they lacked any armour, were provided with an enlarged fuel tank in lieu of armament, and had an incomplete avionics outfit. The parade was canceled and two of the aircraft were modified with a single 23 mm cannon and began State acceptance trials which lasted until April 1947.

The tests revealed a number of problems in that the thick wing inherited from the Yak-3 limited the top speed of the aircraft, the engine exhaust damaged the surface of the airfield, the cockpit often filled with smoke from kerosene and oil that had dripped onto the engine, and the aircraft was very short-ranged. Despite these problems, the Yak-15 proved to be very easy to fly, even for pilots accustomed to piston-engined fighters, and caused the VVS to accept the fighter as a conversion trainer.

Even before the State acceptance trials were completed, the Council of Ministers ordered the aircraft into production in December 1946. 50 aircraft were to be built between January and April 1947, equally split between single-seat aircraft and two-seat trainers, armed with only a single cannon. The trainer ran into serious development difficulties and all the aircraft of the first batch were single-seaters. Fifty of these participated in the May Day flypast in Moscow in 1947. A total of 280 Yak-15s were produced through the end of the year, exclusive of prototypes. The aircraft were distributed in small numbers to fighter aviation regiments based in the USSR, Poland, Romania, Hungary, and Manchuria for use as conversion trainers. The aircraft's manoeuvrability led it to be used by a number of informal acrobatic display teams throughout the late 1940s.

A single prototype of the two-seat trainer was the first aircraft of the first production batch built by Factory No. 31 in the fall of 1946. The prototype did not begin manufacturer's flight testing until 5 April 1947, even though the primary differences from the single-seat version were limited to a redesigned forward fuselage that accommodated an additional cockpit for the trainee where the armament used to be and a sideways-opening, canopy. The trainer was initially designated as the Yak-Jumo vyvoznoy, but it was eventually designated as the Yak-21 although some documents refer to it as the Yak-15V, Yak-15UT or Yak-21V. Further work on the trainer was cancelled with the success of the trainer version of the Yak-17 with its tricycle undercarriage.

One Yak-15 was used to test a prototype aerial refueling system in 1949, although the installation on the fighter and the Tupolev Tu-2 bomber used as the tanker were both dummies to test procedures and fit.

=== Yak-17-RD10 ===
On 29 April 1946, five days after the Mikoyan-Gurevich I-300 (MiG-9 Prototype) and the Yak-Jumo made their first flights, the Council of Ministers ordered that the Yakovlev OKB begin design of a new aircraft similar to the Yak-Jumo, using the RD-10 engine with improved aerodynamics. This generally resembled the original aircraft, but the wings were entirely redesigned with laminar flow airfoils, the tail structure was enlarged and an ejection seat was fitted.

The back of the seat was armoured and the pilot was also protected by a bulletproof windscreen. The entire canopy was also redesigned to accommodate the new windscreen. The landing gear could not be housed in the thin wings so it was redesigned to retract into the fuselage. Low and high wing loading wing versions were considered, but the low wing loading 15-square-meter (160 sq ft) wings were chosen for the prototype.

At an altitude of 5000 meters, the Yak-17-RD10, as the new fighter was designated, was expected to have a top speed of 822 km/h (511 mph); a significant improvement over that of the production Yak-15. The aircraft was completed on 3 September and ground tests lasted until 26 September, but it never flew as the Yak-15 had already been ordered into production and its conventional landing gear was already deemed obsolete.

== Survivors ==
Only one Yak-15 survives, 'Yellow 37' at the Vadim Zadorozhny Technical Museum outside Moscow. It was purchased by the technical museum when the Yakovlev OKB's museum was liquidated in 2006.

== Variants ==
Data from: OKB Yakovlev

- Yak-Jumo (Yak-3-Jumo): The first prototypes of the Yak-15 series, powered by captured Jumo 004 engines.
- Yak-15-RD10: (also referred to as Yak-RD) Initial designation of prototypes and early production aircraft powered by Soviet-built RD-10 engines (copies of the Jumo 004), with no or reduced armament.
- Yak-15: Production aircraft with full armament
- Yak-21: Two-seat training version of Yak-15. One built, but not proceeded with because of the success of the trainer version of the Yak-17.
- Yak-15V: (V - Vyvozny - familiarisation trainer) Alternative designation for the Yak-21.
- Yak-15U: (U - Uchebnotrenirovochnyy - training) Alternative designation for the Yak-21.
- Yak-15U (Yakovlev Yak-15U-RD10): (U - uloochshenny - improved) Improved Yak-15 with tricycle undercarriage and drop tanks, became the prototype of the Yak-17 proper.

=== Similar but unrelated aircraft ===
Yak-17-RD10: An experimental aircraft, similar in appearance to the Yak-Jumo aircraft, but actually largely new, incorporating improved aerodynamics, an ejection seat and protection for the pilot. The sole prototype remained unflown after further development was cancelled on 26 September 1946, as taxi tests were being carried out.

== Operators ==
Soviet Union

- Soviet Air Forces

== Specifications (Yak-15) ==
Yak-15 3-view drawing

Data from OKB Yakovlev: A History of the Design Bureau and Its Aircraft

General characteristics

- Crew: 1
- Length: 8.7 m (28 ft 7 in)
- Wingspan: 9.2 m (30 ft 2 in)
- Wing area: 14.85 m^{2} (159.8 sq ft)
- Empty weight: 1,852 kg (4,083 lb)
- Gross weight: 2,638 kg (5,816 lb)
- Fuel capacity: 590 kg (1,300 lb)
- Powerplant: 1 × Klimov RD-10 turbojet, 8.8 kN (2,000 lbf) thrust

Performance

- Maximum speed: 786 km/h (489 mph, 425 kn)
- Combat range: 510 km (320 mi, 280 nmi)
- Service ceiling: 12,000 m (39,000 ft)
- Rate of climb: 21.6 m/s (4,250 ft/min)
- Wing loading: 197 kg/m^{2} (40 lb/sq ft)

Armament

- Guns: 2 × 23 mm (0.91 in) Nudelman-Suranov NS-23 cannon with 60 rounds each

== See also ==
Related development

- Yakovlev Yak-17
- Yakovlev Yak-23

Aircraft of comparable role, configuration, and era

- Lavochkin Aircraft 150
- Lavochkin Aircraft 152
- Aerfer Sagittario
- Aerfer Ariete

Related lists

- List of military aircraft of the Soviet Union and the CIS

== Bibliography ==
- Gordon, Yefim. Early Soviet Jet Fighters. Midland, 2002. ISBN 1-85780-139-3
- Gordon, Yefim and Dmitriy Kommissarov. Early Soviet Jet Fighters. Hikoki Publications, 2014. ISBN 978-1-90210-935-0
- Gordon, Yefim, Dimtry Kommissarov, and Sergey Komissariov. OKB Yakovlev: A History of the Design Bureau and Its Aircraft. Midland, 2005. ISBN 1-85780-203-9
- Green, William and Gordon Swanborough. The Complete Book of Fighters. Smithmark, 1994. ISBN 0-8317-3939-8
- Greenwood, John T., Robin Higham and Von Hardesty. Russian Aviation and Air Power in the Twentieth Century. Routledge, 1998. ISBN 978-0-7146-4784-5
- Gunston, Bill. The Osprey Encyclopedia of Russian Aircraft 1875-1995. Osprey, 1995. ISBN 1-85532-405-9
- Gunston, Bill and Yefim Gordon. Yakovlev Aircraft Since 1924. Putnam Aeronautical Books, 1997. ISBN 1-55750-978-6
- Mikolajczuk, Marian. Yakovlev Yak-23: The First Yakovlev Jet Fighters. Stratus, 2008. ISBN 978-83-89450-54-8
