= Tushino Airfield =

Tushino Тушино
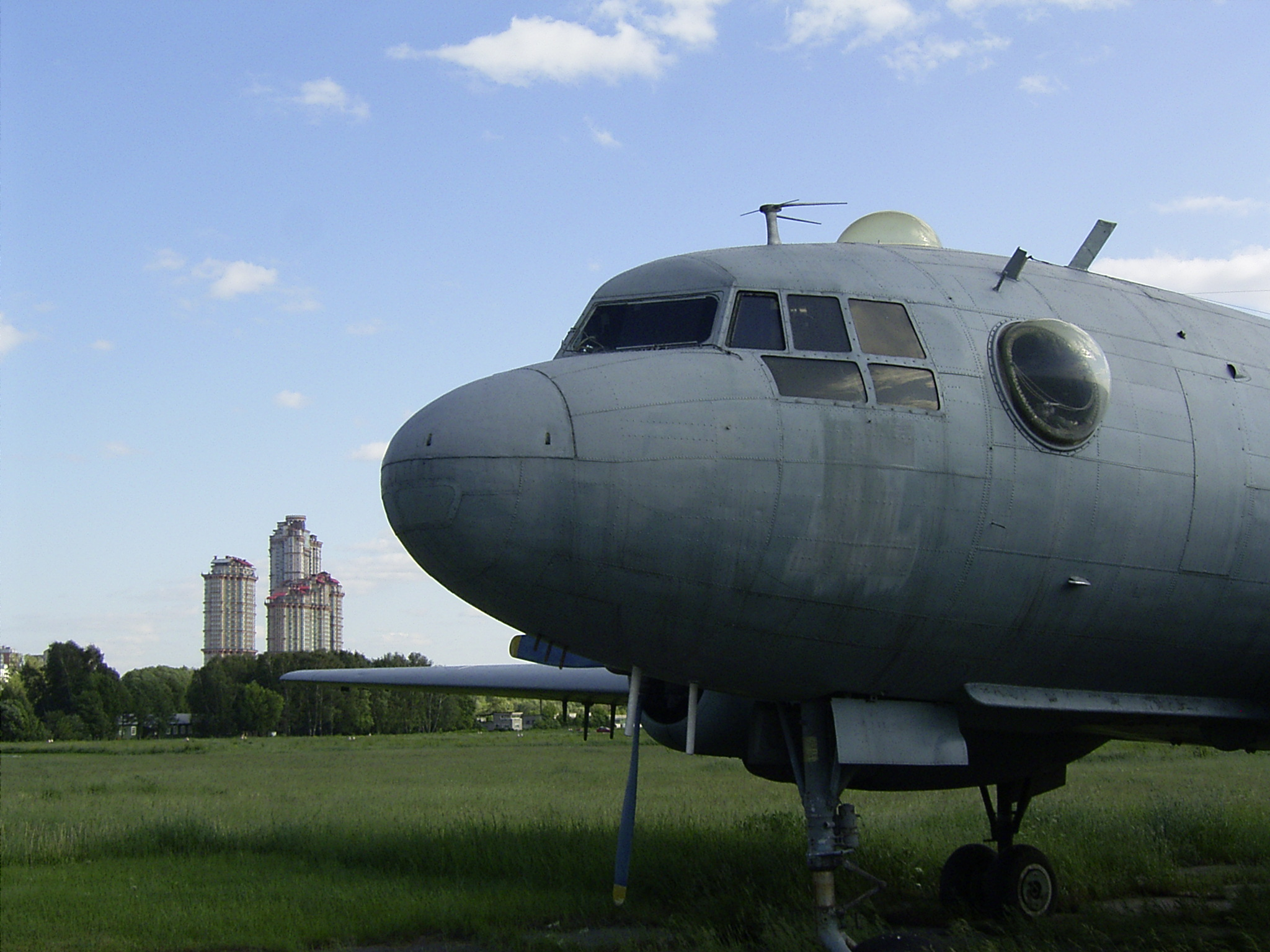
- Il-14 on the Tushino airfield
- IATA: none; ICAO: UUUS

Summary
- Airport type: Public
- Location: Moscow
- Elevation AMSL: 128 m (420 ft)
- Coordinates: 55°49′6″N 037°25′36″E
- Website: www.aero-tushino.ru

Map
- Location within Russia

Runways
Direction	Length		Surface
Direction	m	ft	Surface
11/29	1,300	4,265	Dirt

Tushino (Russian: Тушино) (ICAO: UUUS) was a former general aviation airfield located in Tushino, northwest Moscow, Russia. During the Cold War, this was the site of military exercises showcasing the latest in Soviet innovation. These exercises were held on Soviet Air Fleet Day. Nowadays, the grounds are the site of the Otkritie Arena, the home of FC Spartak Moscow, one of Russia's leading football clubs.

== Dates ==
=== Soviet Air Fleet Day ===
The most frequent date of air shows was the Soviet Air Fleet Day (День Воздушного Флота). It was also known as the Soviet Air Forces Day (День Военно-воздушных Сил), or Soviet Aviation Day. It was established in 1933. In the period from 1933 to 1940 it was held on August 18, a free day in the calendar of that time. Later it was most usually held on the third Sunday of August, if only weather permitted. The initial exhibition on August 18, 1933, was a result of Yakov Alksnis initiative, and was held in Khodynka (the Central Moscow Aerodrome), but since the next year the show became located on Tushino airfield near Moscow, where it remained for decades. In 1937, the parade was attended by nearly a million people, observing the masses of aircraft spelling in the sky "LENIN", "STALIN" and "SSSR". The celebrations repeated until the fall of Soviet Union, and continue in Russia (the location is now Zhukovsky International Airport, see MAKS airshow).

=== May Day ===
The 1st of May was dedicated to a multitude of parades throughout the Soviet Union. They often included large-scale flypasts.

=== Other ===
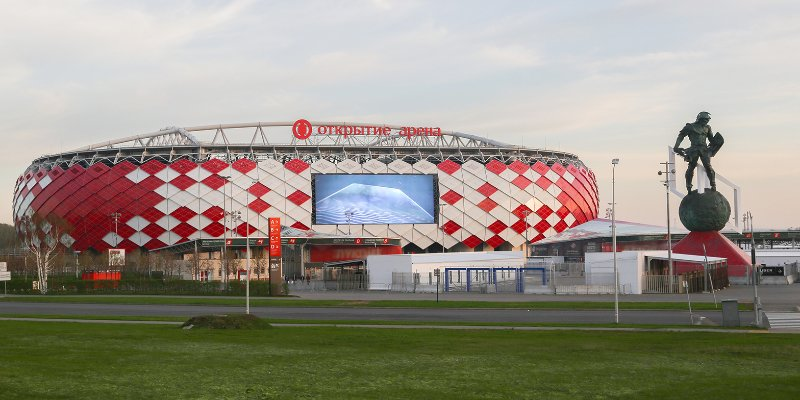
Otkritie Arena, one of the main construction objects built on the site of closed Tushino Airfield.

The Soviet Air Fleet Day became primarily associated with Soviet Air Forces (VVS), so a separate day has been established for Soviet Air Defense Forces (PVO) a second arm of Soviet military that employed numerous fighter squadrons. It was called Soviet Air Defense Forces Day (День войск противовоздушной обороны СССР), occurred on the second Sunday of April, and was celebrated with air parades of lesser scale.

In 1991, Tushino Airfield was used to host the first outdoor rock festival ever held in the Soviet Union - the free Monsters of Rock concert featuring AC/DC, Metallica, the Black Crowes and Pantera. Official estimates placed the crowd at between 1,000,000 and 1,600,000 people. The crowd was unofficially estimated to number at least 1.5 million people and went down in history as the largest concert all participating bands have played in their respective careers. The concert has been recorded into the concert film For Those About to Rock: Monsters in Moscow.

Furthermore, 200,000 people attended the "Inside Bram" backdoor tour. The "Bram" backstage tour was planned to tour through Germany, France and Spain, but was cancelled due to health issues.

The stadium of Spartak Moscow was built on the site of the Tushino Airport. Otkrytie Arena (or Spartak Stadium) is a multi-purpose stadium in Moscow, the construction of which started in October 2010. It's used mostly for football matches and host the home matches of FC Spartak Moscow. The stadium was designed with a capacity of 35,000 people, but later this was changed to a 42,000 people. The stadium hosted 2017 FIFA Confederations Cup and 2018 FIFA World Cup games.

== See also ==
- Soviet air shows, for which Tushino airfield is notable.
