= Lavochkin La-152 =

Soviet jet fighter prototype

Izdeliye 152
- Izdeliye 152

General information
- Type: Jet fighter prototype
- National origin: Soviet Union
- Manufacturer: Lavochkin
- Designer: Semyon Alekseyevich Lavochkin
- Number built: 4

History
- First flight: 5 December 1946
- Developed from: Lavochkin La-150
- Developed into: Lavochkin La-160

The Lavochkin La-152, (Note: All Lavochkin's jet aircraft were referred to in-house, and at government level, as "Izdeliye (Item or Product) 152", etc.) (USAF reporting name - Type 4), and its variants, was a jet fighter prototype designed and manufactured by the Lavochkin Design Bureau (OKB) shortly after the end of World War II. Derived from the Lavochkin La-150, the 152 used several different engines, but the program was canceled as other fighters with more powerful engines and swept wings showed more promise.

== Design and development ==
=== Izdeliye 152 ===
Following the limited success of the 150, drastic changes were introduced to improve performance and ease of maintenance. The RD-10 engine, rated at 8.8 kN (2,000 lb_{f}) of thrust, was moved to the front of the nose and its cowling formed the bottom of the forward fuselage. This position minimized thrust losses due to the length of the intake duct and allowed the engine to be changed much more easily than its predecessor. The cockpit was widened and moved to a position over the mid-set wings, even with the engine's exhaust nozzle. The pilot's seat back was armored and he was protected by an armor plate to his front and a bulletproof windscreen. Three fuel tanks were positioned ahead of the cockpit and one behind it with a total capacity of 620 kilograms (1,370 lb) of fuel. The removable, mid-mounted wings used several different laminar flow airfoils over their span. Each wing had a single spar, slotted flaps and ailerons. The tricycle undercarriage retracted into the fuselage, which meant that the aircraft had a very narrow ground track. The aircraft was armed with three 23-millimeter (0.91 in) Nudelman-Suranov NS-23 autocannon, two on the starboard side of the aircraft's nose and the other on the port side. Each gun had 50 rounds of ammunition.

The 152 made its first flight on 5 December 1946 and the manufacturer's trials completed on 23 June 1947. State acceptance trials commenced on 12 July, but the prototype crashed on the eighth flight when the engine failed on approach. The maximum speed attained by the 152 before its crash was only 840 kilometers per hour (520 mph).

=== Izdeliye 154 ===
The Lavochkin OKB decided to improve the performance of the 152 in late 1946 by replacing the RD-10 engine with a more powerful Lyulka TR-1 turbojet of 12.3 kN (2,800 lb_{f}) thrust. The design work was completed in September 1947, and construction began of a prototype shortly afterward, but the engine was not yet ready for testing and the project was canceled. The only other significant difference from the 152 was that each cannon was furnished with 75 rounds of ammunition.

=== Izdeliye 156 ===
Meanwhile, the OKB had been developing two afterburning versions of the RD-10 to increase the engine's power. The more successful model was only 100 millimeters (3.9 in) longer and weighed an additional 31 kilograms (68 lb) more than the original engine. Its power, however, was increased by an additional 3.3 kN (740 lb_{f}), over 30% more thrust. This engine was designated the izdeliye YuF by the bureau (Note: Confusingly, some sources refer to both this engine and Yakovlev's afterburning version of the RD-10 as RD-10Fs, although they had two different afterburner designs.) and was fitted into an aircraft 152 prototype in November 1946, initially designated as the 150D (Dooblyor - Second). This was changed to Aircraft 156 the following month.

In addition to the more powerful engine, the aircraft now had an ejection seat, additional cockpit armor, and a revised canopy. More importantly, it was fitted with new wings with a greater span and more surface area; they also had a new airfoil designed to delay Mach tuck. The area of the tailplane and the vertical stabilizer was also increased. Two prototypes were built and the first one was completed in February 1947 and made its first flight on 1 March. The second prototype joined the manufacturer's trials later that month. One of these aircraft participated in the Tushino flypast on 3 August 1947, where it was given the USAF reporting name of Type 5. The additional power increased the aircraft's top speed by 40–70 km/h (25–43 mph) over the 152. The second prototype began state acceptance trials on 9 September and demonstrated a maximum speed of 905 km/h (562 mph) at an altitude of 2,000 meters (6,560 ft). It could reach 5,000 meters (16,400 ft) in four minutes using afterburner. The aircraft was rejected by the Soviet Air Forces when the trials were concluded on 28 January 1948. The report said that the YuF engine was required more work before it was ready for production, the aircraft had problems with longitudinal stability, excessive stick forces from the ailerons and elevators, and the undercarriage was troublesome. Lavochkin consequently canceled the program.

=== Izdeliye 174TK ===
An experimental version of Izdeliye 156 was built in 1947 under the name of Izdeliye 174TK (Tonkoye Krylo - thin wing). It had a very thin, straight wing of 6% thickness, believed to be the thinnest yet flown in the world, and an imported Rolls-Royce Derwent V engine, rated at 15.6 kN (3,500 lb_{f}), mounted in the nose. The three NS-23 cannon had to be repositioned on the bottom of the nose to accommodate the engine. It was first flown in January 1948 and had a top speed of 970 km/h (600 mph) at sea level. It reached an altitude of 5,000 meters in only 2.5 minutes, but even these impressive gains over the 156 were inferior to the swept-wing Lavochkin La-160 that had flown nine months earlier and the program was canceled.

== Variants ==
- Izdeliye 154 - A second 152 airframe with a Lyulka TR-1 turbojet. Canceled due to delays with the engine.
- Izdeliye 156 - Originally known as Aircraft 152D. A modified 152 with a YuF engine, an afterburning version of the RD-10.
- Izdeliye 174TK - A thin-wing version of the 156 with a Rolls-Royce Derwent engine, but performance was already overshadowed by the lower-powered Aircraft 160 so further development abandoned.

== Specifications (Izdeliye 156) ==

Data from Early Soviet Jet Fighters

General characteristics

- Crew: 1
- Length: 9.12 m (29 ft 11 in)
- Wingspan: 8.52 m (27 ft 11 in)
- Wing area: 13.24 m^{2} (142.5 sq ft)
- Empty weight: 2,398 kg (5,287 lb)
- Gross weight: 3,521 kg (7,762 lb)
- Fuel capacity: 756 kg
- Powerplant: 1 × YuF after-burning version of RD-10 turbojet, 8.5 kN (1,900 lbf) thrust dry, 10.3 kN (2,300 lbf) with afterburner

Performance

- Maximum speed: 905 km/h (562 mph, 489 kn)
- Range: 680 km (420 mi, 370 nmi)
- Service ceiling: 10,700 m (35,100 ft)
- Rate of climb: 23.6 m/s (4,650 ft/min)
- Wing loading: 264 kg/m^{2} (54 lb/sq ft)

Armament

- Guns: 3 × 23 mm Nudelman-Suranov NS-23 autocannon with 190 rounds total

== See also ==
Related development

- Lavochkin Aircraft 160

Aircraft of comparable role, configuration, and era

- Yakovlev Yak-15
- Yakovlev Yak-17-RD10

Related lists

- List of military aircraft of the Soviet Union and the CIS
