= Junkers Jumo 004 =

Early turbojet aircraft engine

Jumo 004
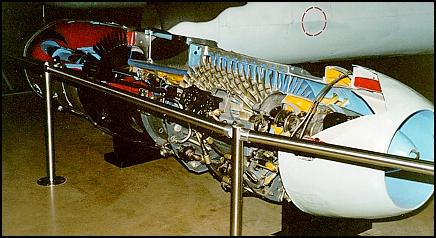
- Cutaway example of a Junkers Jumo 004 jet engine at the National Museum of the U.S. Air Force, Wright-Patterson AFB, Ohio.
- Type: Turbojet
- National origin: Germany
- Manufacturer: Junkers
- First run: 1940
- Major applications: Arado Ar 234; Messerschmitt Me 262

The Junkers Jumo 004 was the world's first production turbojet engine in operational use, and the first successful axial compressor turbojet engine. Some 8,000 units were manufactured by Junkers in Germany late in World War II, powering the Messerschmitt Me 262 fighter and the Arado Ar 234 reconnaissance/bomber, along with prototypes, including the Horten Ho 229. Variants and copies of the engine were produced in Eastern Europe and the USSR for several years following the end of WWII.

== Design and development ==
The feasibility of jet propulsion had been demonstrated in Germany in early 1937 by Hans von Ohain working with the Heinkel company. Most of the Reich Air Ministry (RLM) remained uninterested, but Helmut Schelp and Hans Mauch saw the potential of the concept and encouraged Germany's aero engine manufacturers to begin their own programmes of jet engine development. The companies remained skeptical and little new development was carried out.

In 1939 Schelp and Mauch visited the companies to check up on progress. Otto Mader, head of the Junkers Motorenwerke (Jumo) division of the large Junkers aviation firm, stated that even if the concept was useful, he had no one to work on it. Schelp responded by stating that Dr Anselm Franz, then in charge of Junkers' turbo- and supercharger development, would be perfect for the job. Franz started his development team later that year, and the project was given the RLM designation 109-004 (the 109- prefix, assigned by the RLM was common to all reaction engine projects in WWII Germany, including German WWII rocket engine designs for manned aircraft).

Franz opted for a design that was at once conservative and revolutionary. His design differed from von Ohain's in that he utilised a new type of compressor which allowed a continuous, straight flow of air through the engine (an axial compressor), recently developed by the Aerodynamische Versuchsanstalt (AVA – Aerodynamic Research Institute) at Göttingen. The axial-flow compressor not only had excellent performance, about 78% efficient in "real world" conditions, but it also had a smaller cross-section, important for high-speed aircraft. Dr. Bruno Bruckman's old assistant on the jet engine program, Dr. Österich, took over for him in Berlin, and selected the axial flow design, due to its smaller diameter; it was 10 cm (3.9 in) less than the competing axial-flow BMW 003.

On the other hand, he aimed to produce an engine that was far below its theoretical potential, in the interests of expediting development and simplifying production. One major decision was to opt for a simple combustion area using six "flame cans", instead of the more efficient single annular can. For the same reasons, he collaborated heavily on the development of the engine's turbine with Allgemeine Elektrizitäts-Gesellschaft (General Electric Company, AEG) in Berlin, and instead of building development engines, opted to begin work immediately on the prototype of an engine that could be put straight into production. Franz's conservative approach came under question from the RLM, but was vindicated when even given the developmental problems that it was to face, the 004 entered production and service well ahead of the BMW 003, its more technologically advanced but slightly lower thrust competitor (7.83 kN/1,760 lbf).

At Kolbermoor, location of the Heinkel-Hirth engine works, the post-war Fedden Mission, led by Sir Roy Fedden, found jet engine manufacturing was simpler and required lower-skill labor and less sophisticated tooling than piston engine production; in fact, most of the making of hollow turbine blades and sheet metal work on jets could be done by tooling used in making automobile body panels. Fedden himself criticized the attachment of the 004's compressor casing, which was in two halves, bolted to the half-sections of the stator assemblies.

=== Technical description and testing ===
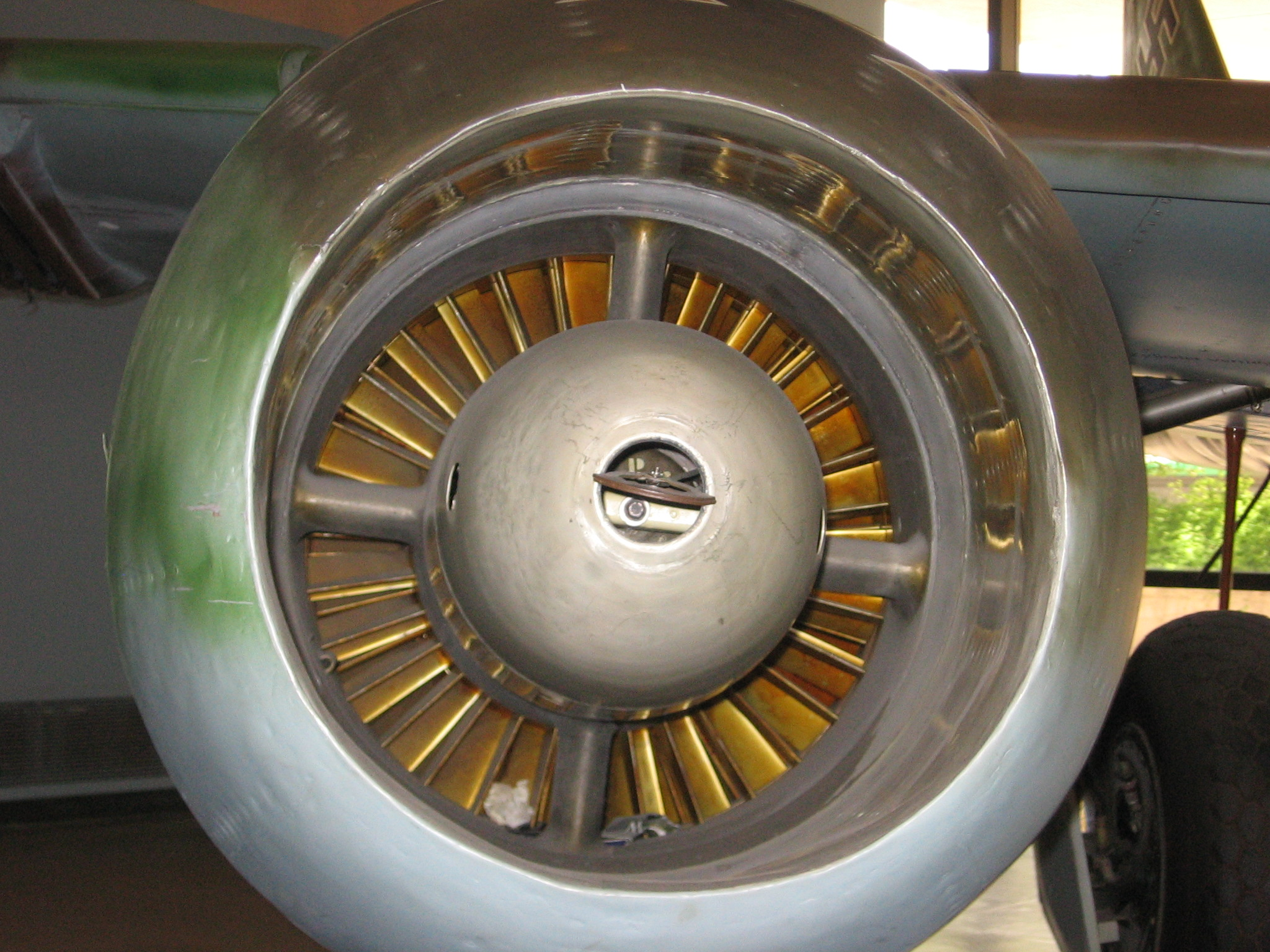
Frontal view of a Jumo 004 engine mounted in a nacelle on an Me 262 fighter, showing the starter pull-start handle in the center of the intake nose cone.

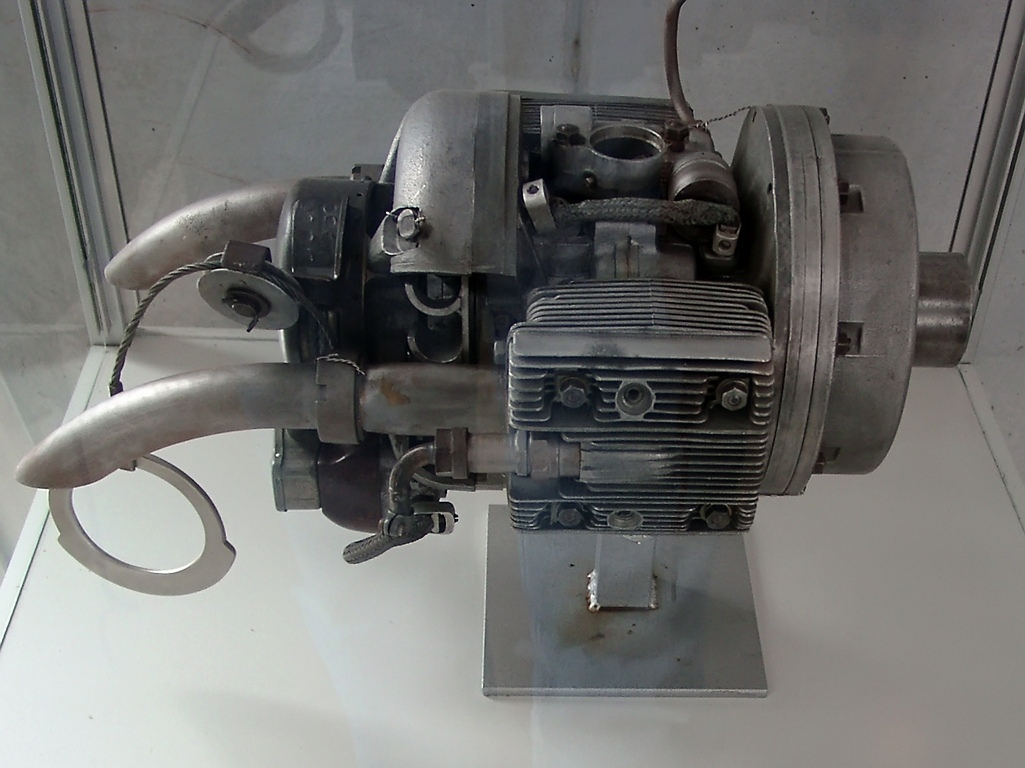
Riedel starter, with pull-start handle and cable

The first prototype 004A, which used diesel fuel, was first tested in October 1940, though without an exhaust nozzle. It was bench-tested at the end of January 1941 to a maximum thrust of 430 kgf (4,200 N; 950 lbf), and work continued to increase the thrust, the RLM contract having set a minimum of 600 kgf (5,900 N; 1,300 lbf) thrust.

Vibration problems with the compressor stators, originally cantilevered from the outside, delayed the program at this point. Max Bentele, as an Air Ministry consulting engineer with a background in turbocharger vibrations, assisted in solving the problem. The original aluminium stators were replaced with steel ones in which configuration the engine developed 5.9 kN (1,300 lb_{f}) in August, and passed a 10-hour endurance run at 9.8 kN (2,200 lb_{f}) in December. The first flight test took place on March 15, 1942, when a 004A was carried aloft by a Messerschmitt Bf 110 to run up the engine in flight. The 004 used an eight-stage axial-flow compressor, with six straight-through combustion chambers (made from sheet steel), and a one-stage turbine with hollow blades.

On July 18, one of the prototype Messerschmitt Me 262s flew for the first time under jet power from its 004 engines, and the 004 went into production with an order from the RLM for 80 engines.

The initial 004A engines built to power the Me 262 prototypes had been built without restrictions on materials, and they used scarce raw materials such as nickel, cobalt, and molybdenum in quantities which were unacceptable in production. Franz realized that the Jumo 004 would have to be redesigned to incorporate a minimum of these strategic materials, and this was accomplished. All the hot metal parts, including the combustion chamber, were changed to mild steel protected by an aluminum coating, and the hollow turbine blades were produced from folded and welded Cromadur alloy (12% chromium, 18% manganese, and 70% iron) developed by Krupp, and cooled by compressed air "bled" from the compressor. The engine's operational lifespan was shortened, but on the plus side it became easier to construct. Production engines had a cast magnesium casing in two halves, one with half-sections of stator assemblies bolted to it. The four front stators were constructed from steel alloy blades welded to the mount; the rear five were pressed steel sheet bent over the mount and welded on. Steel alloy compressor blades dovetailled into slots in the compressor disk and were fixed by small screws. The compressor itself was mounted to a steel shaft with twelve set screws. Jumo tried a variety of compressor blades, beginning with solid steel, later hollow sheet metal ones, welded on the taper, with their roots fitted over rhomboidal studs on the turbine wheel, to which they were pinned and brazed.

One interesting feature of the 004 was the starter, designed by the German engineer Norbert Riedel, which consisted of a 10 hp (7.5 kW) 2-stroke flat engine behind the intake nose-cone. A hole in the front of the cone gave access to a manual pull-start if the electric starter motor failed. Two small gasoline/oil mix tanks were fitted within the upper perimeter of the annular intake's sheet metal housing for fuelling the starter. The Riedel was also used for starting the competing BMW 003 engine, and for Heinkel's more advanced HeS 011 "mixed-flow" compressor design.

The first production model of the 004B weighed 100 kg (220 lb) less than the 004A, and in 1943 had passed several 100-hour tests, with a time between overhauls of 50 hours being achieved.

Later in 1943 the 004B version suffered turbine blade failures which were not understood by the Junkers team. They focused on areas such as material defects, grain size and surface roughness. Eventually, in December, blade-vibration specialist Max Bentele was once again brought in during a meeting at the RLM headquarters. He identified that the failures were caused by one of the blades' natural frequencies being in the engine running range. His solution was to raise the frequency, by increasing the blade taper and shortening them by 1 millimetre, and to reduce the operating speed of the engine from 9,000 to 8,700 rpm.

It was not until early 1944 that full production could finally begin. These sorts of engineering detail challenges for the 109-004-series of jet engine designs, formed the setbacks that were the principal factor delaying the Luftwaffe's introduction of the Me 262 into squadron service.

Given the lower-quality steels used in the 004B, these engines had a service life of only 10–25 hours, perhaps twice this in the hands of a careful pilot. Another shortcoming of the engine, common to all early turbojets, was its sluggish throttle response. Worse, too much fuel could be injected into the combustion chambers by moving the throttle too quickly, causing the temperature to rise too far before the airflow increased to match the increased fuel. This overheated the turbine blades, and was a major cause for engine failures. Nevertheless, it made jet power for combat aircraft a reality for the first time.

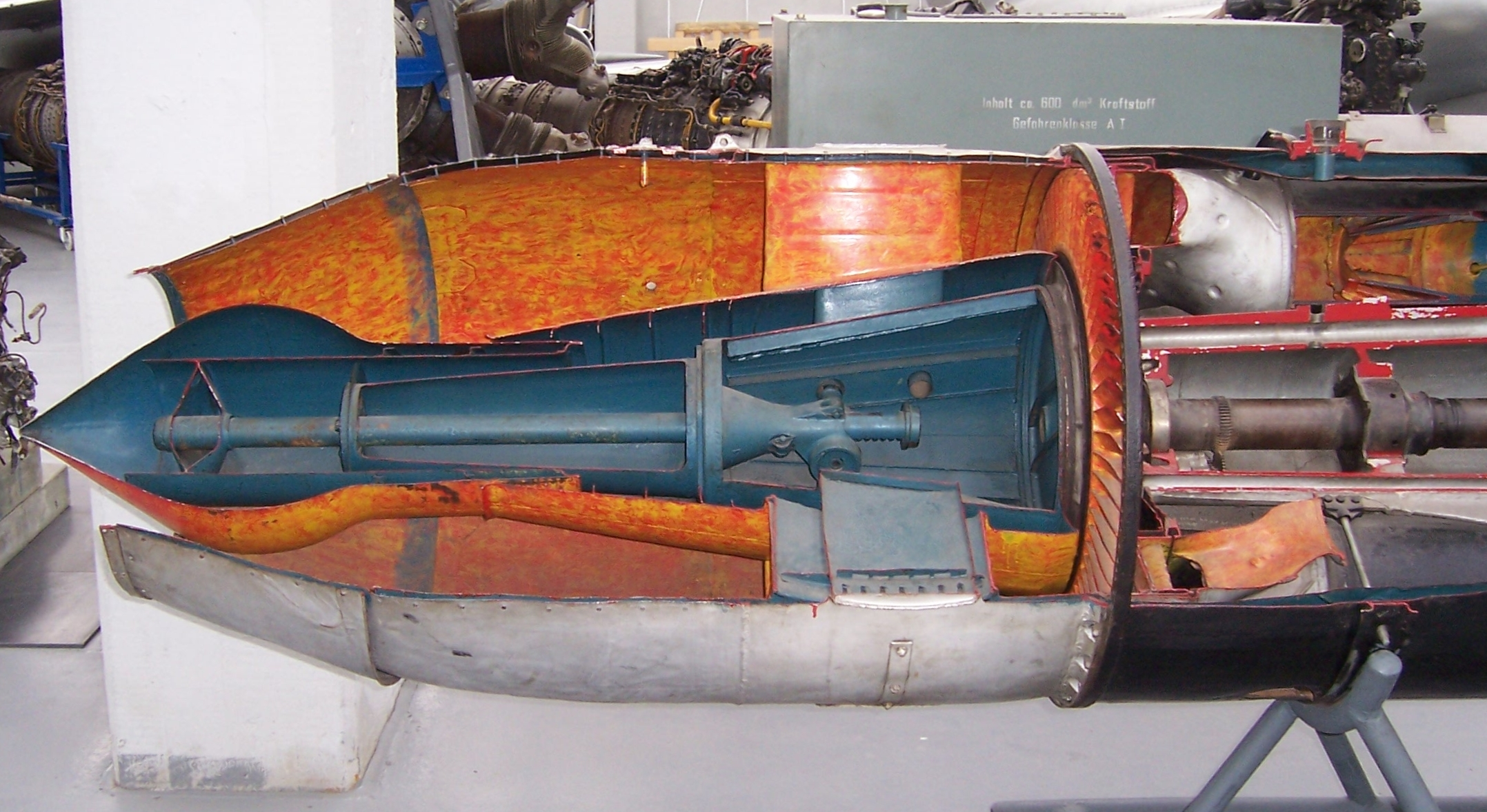
Sectioned Jumo 004 exhaust nozzle, showing the Zwiebel centrebody or plug

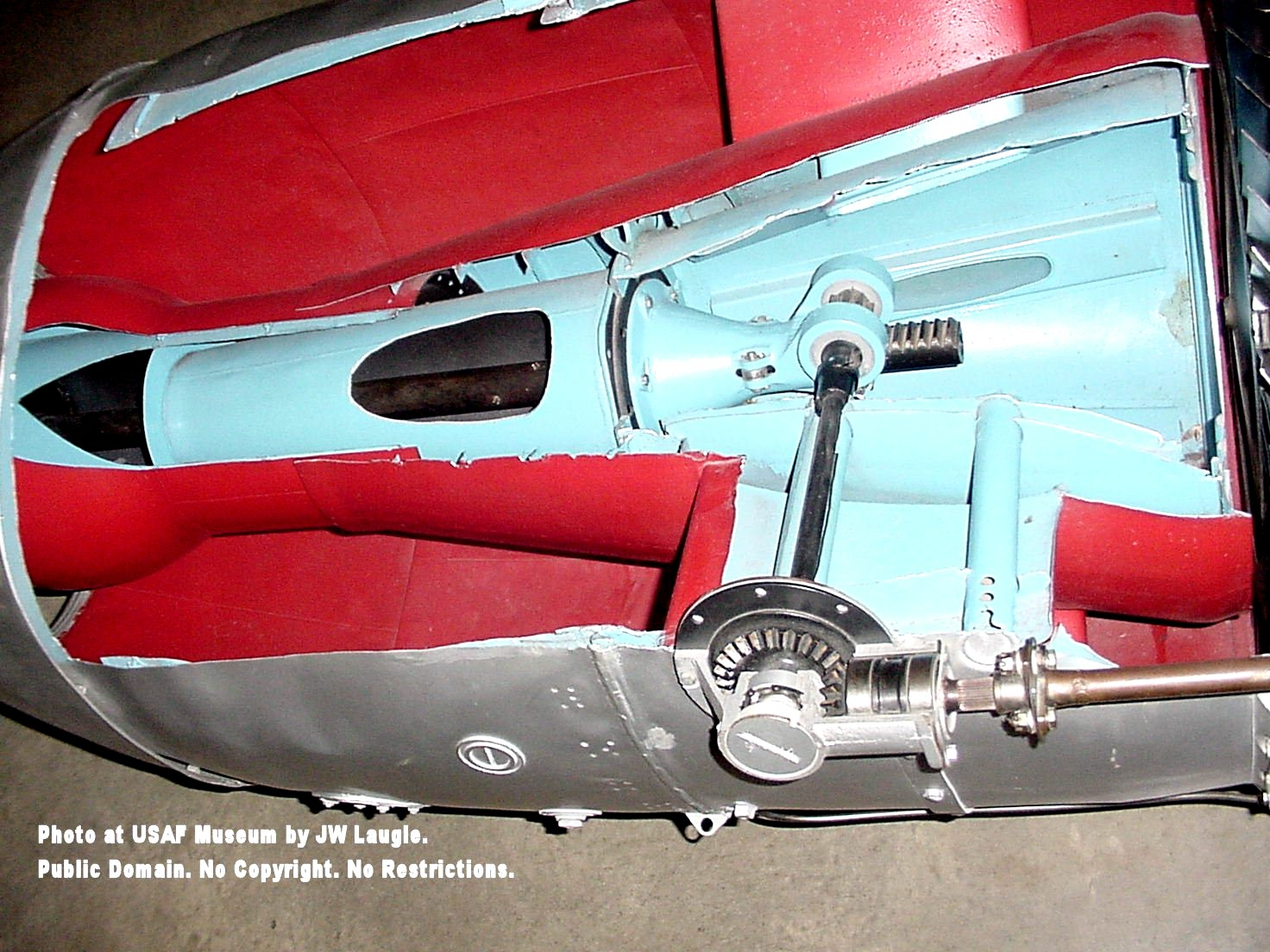
Closeup of gearing which moves the Zwiebel centrebody

The exhaust area of the engine used a a variable geometry nozzle known as a plug nozzle. The plug was nicknamed the Zwiebel (German for onion, due to its shape when seen from the side). The plug moved about 40 cm (16 inch) fore-and-aft, using an electric motor-powered rack-and-pinion, to change the exhaust cross-sectional area for thrust control.

The Jumo 004 could run on three types of fuel:

- J-2, its standard fuel, a synthetic fuel produced from coal.
- Diesel oil.
- Aviation gasoline; not considered desirable due to its high rate of consumption.

Costing RM10,000 for materials, the Jumo 004 also proved somewhat cheaper than the competing BMW 003, which was RM12,000, and cheaper than the Junkers 213 piston engine, which was RM35,000. Moreover, the jets used lower-skill labor and needed only 375 hours to complete (including manufacture, assembly, and shipping), compared to 1,400 for the BMW 801.

Production and maintenance of the 004 was done at the Junkers works at Magdeburg, under the supervision of Otto Hartkopf. Completed engines earned a reputation for unreliability; the time between major overhauls (not technically a time between overhaul) was thirty to fifty hours, and may have been as low as ten, though a skilled flyer could double the interval. (The competing BMW 003's was about fifty.) The process involved replacing compressor blades, (which suffered the most damage, usually from ingesting stones and such, later known as fodding) and turbine blades damaged by the high thermodynamic loads. The Germans were known to use both specially designed wire-framed hemispherical cages and/or flat circular covers over the intakes to prevent ingestion of foreign matter into their aircraft jet engines' intakes while on the ground. The compressor and turbine blades' life could be extended by re-balancing the rotors during routine maintenance; the Riedel two-stroke starter engine and the turbojet's governor would also be examined and replaced as needed. Combustors required maintenance every twenty hours, and replacement at 200.

Between 5,000 and 8,000 004s were built; at the end of the Second World War, production stood at 1,500 per month. The Fedden Mission, led by Sir Roy Fedden, postwar estimated total jet engine production by mid-1946 could have reached 100,000 units a year, or more.

=== Postwar production ===
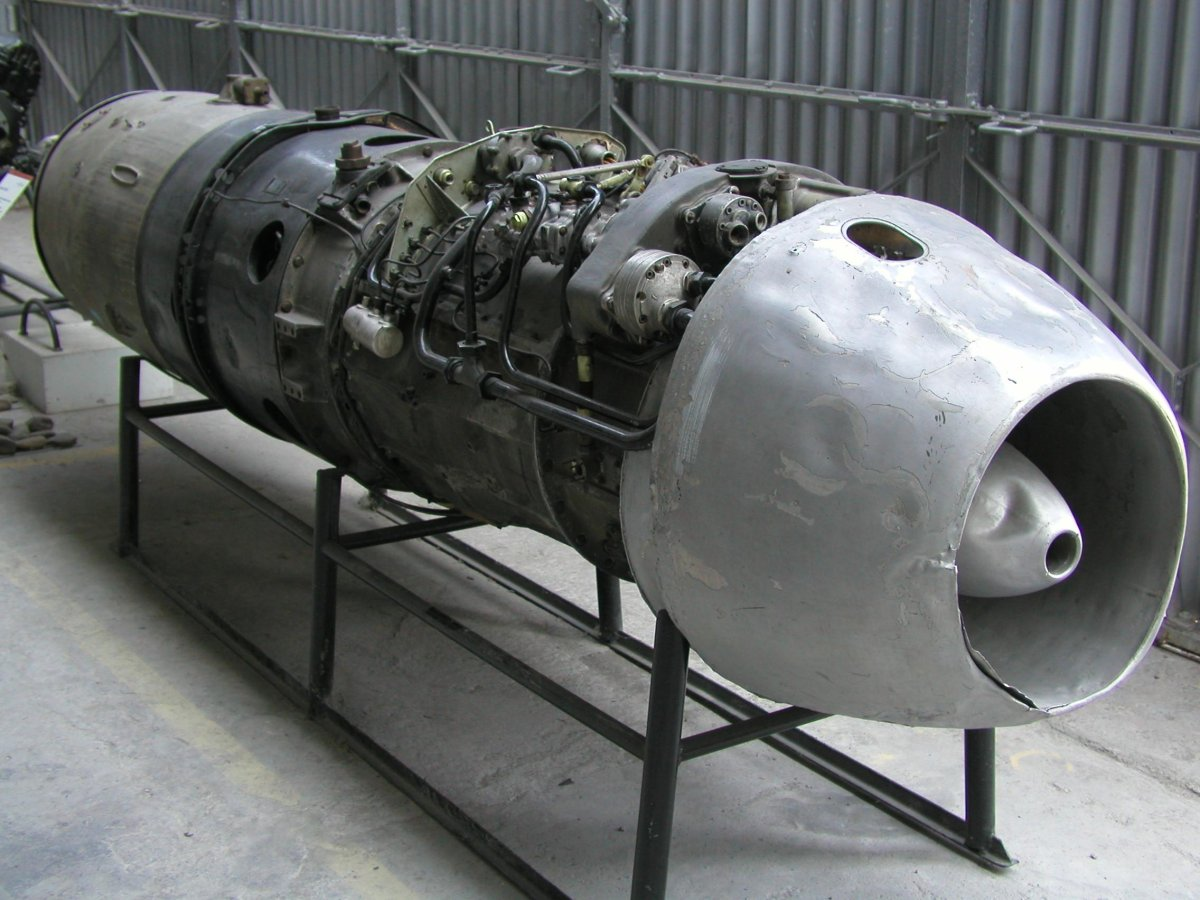
Avia M-04

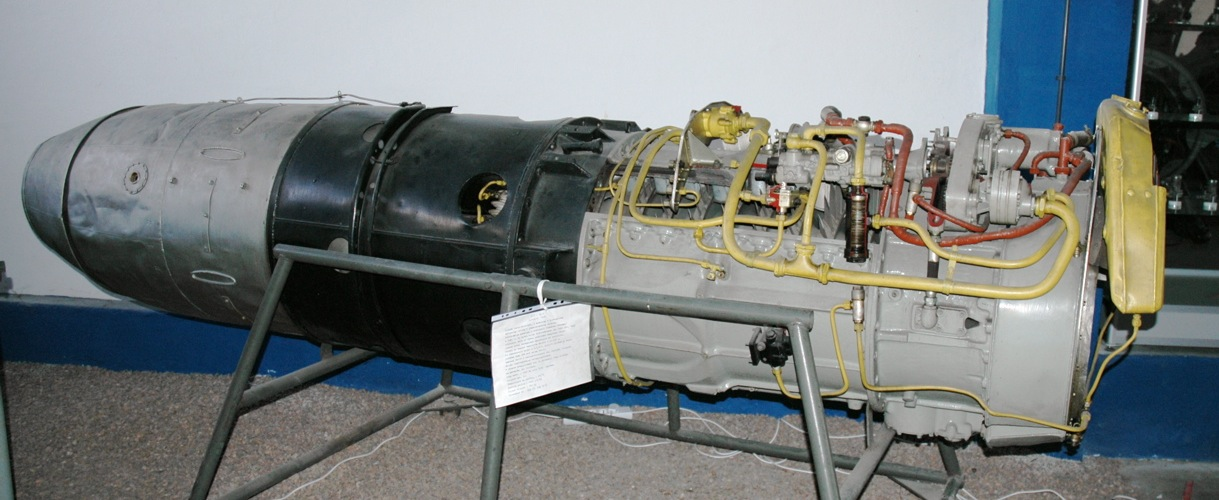
Tumansky RD-10

Following World War II, Jumo 004s were built in small numbers in Malešice in Czechoslovakia, designated Avia Avia M-04, to power the Avia S-92 which was itself a copy of the Me 262. Upgraded Jumo 004 copies were also built in the Soviet Union as the Klimov RD-10, where they powered the Yakovlev Yak-15 as well as many prototype jet fighters.

In France, captured 004s powered the Sud-Ouest SO 6000 Triton and the Arsenal VG-70.

== Variants ==
(Data from: Kay, Turbojet: History and Development 1930–1960: Volume 1: Great Britain and Germany

109-004
1/10 scale (compressor power absorption) prototype engine, test-run with limited success.
109-004A
Full-scale prototype and pre-production engines, powered early Messerschmitt Me 262 and Arado Ar 234 prototypes aircraft.

109-004A-0: Pre-production engines for flight .

109-004B
Production-series engines with reduced weight and strategic materials.

109-004B-0: initial production standard engines, 8.22 kN (1,848 lbf) thrust at 8,700 rpm.
109-004B-1: modified compressor and turbine to reduce vibration and thrust increased to 8.83 kN (1,984 lbf).
109-004B-2: Incorporating a new compressor to reduce vibration failures
109-004B-3: A development model
109-004B-4: Introduce air-cooled hollow turbine blades

109-004C
A projected version with detail refinements giving 9.81 kN (2,205 lbf) thrust, not built.
109-004D
A refined 004B with two-stage fuel injection and a new fuel control unit, ready for production by the end of World War II.

109-004D-4: Modified combustion system for increased thrust but reduced life, for testing only.

109-004E
An 004D with exhaust area optimised for high altitude performance, 11.77 kN (2,646 lbf) thrust with afterburning.
109-004F
Possibly with Water or Water/Methanol injection.
109-004G
Based on the 004C with an 11-stage compressor and 8 can combustion chambers for 16.68 kN (3,749 lbf).
109-004H
A re-designed and enlarged version of the 004 with 11-stage compressor and 2-stage turbine, only reaching the design stage by war's end; projected to deliver 17.7 kN (3,970 lbf) thrust at 6,600 rpm.
Avia M-04
Post-war production of the 004B in Czechoslovakia
RD-10
Designation used for both captured Jumo 004s and copies, built from 1945 onward by a team at 26 GAZ, headed by Klimov and at a captured underground factory near Dessau.

=== Variants table ===
RLM Designation	Type	Layout	Thrust	Weight	RPM
109-004B	Turbojet	8A 6C 1T	8.83 kN (1,984 lbf)	745 kg (1,642 lb)	8,700 rpm
109-004C	Turbojet	8A 6Cn 1T	9.81 kN (2,205 lbf)	720 kg (1,590 lb)	8,700 rpm
109-004D	Turbojet	8A 6C 1T	10.30 kN (2,315 lbf)	745 kg (1,642 lb)	10,000 rpm
109-004H	Turbojet	11A 8C 2T	17.7 kN (3,970 lbf)	1,200 kg (2,600 lb)	6,600 rpm

Layout: A=axial flow compressor stages, C=can combustion chambers, T=turbine stages.

== Applications ==
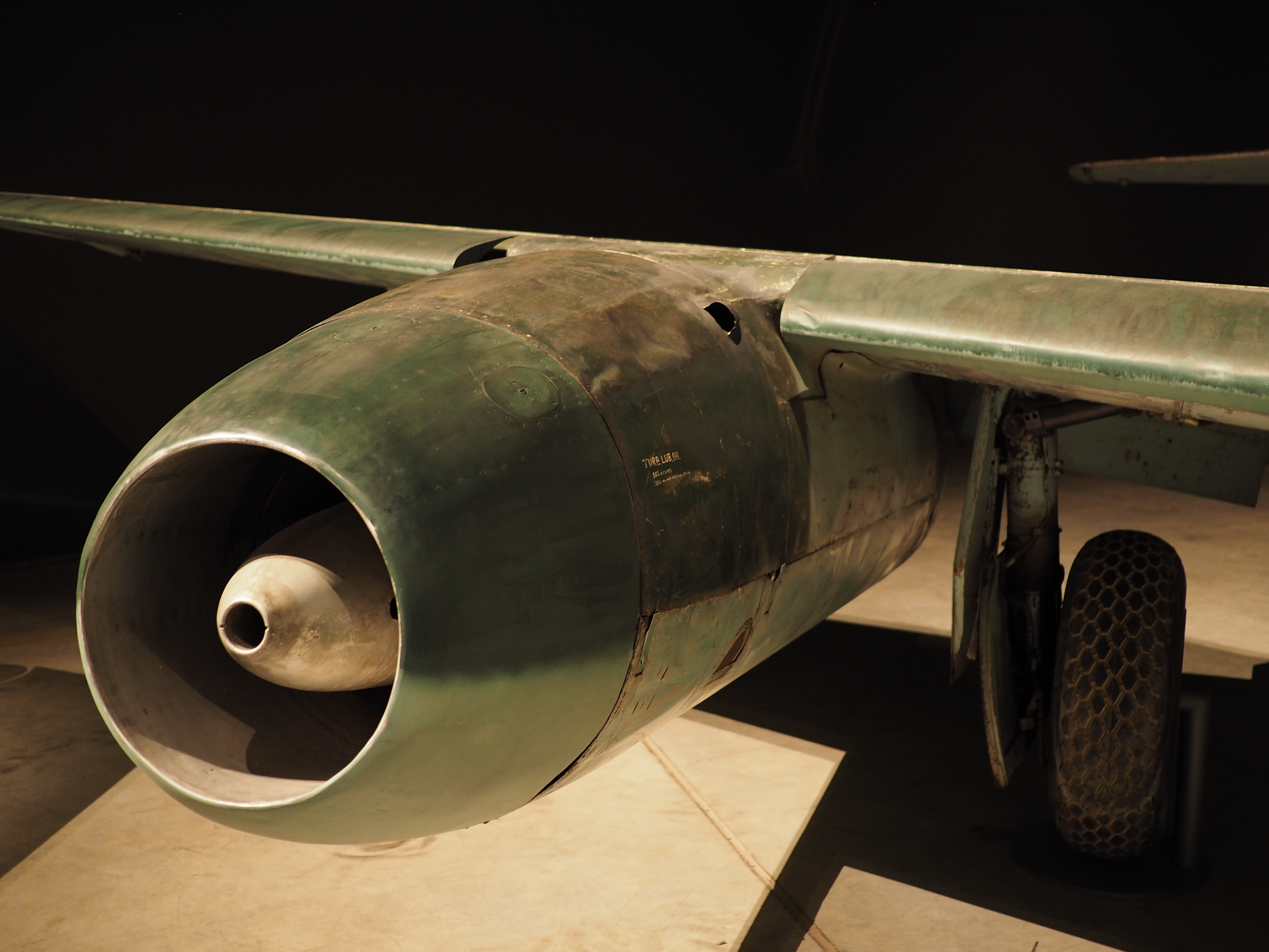
The starboard Junkers Jumo 004 engine of the Me 262 displayed at the Australian War Memorial

- Arado Ar 234
- Avia S-92: (Avia M-04) Czechoslovak-built Me 262 A-1a (fighter)
- Avia CS-92: (Avia M-04) Czechoslovak-built Me 262 B-1a (fighter trainer, two seats)
- Blohm & Voss P.188
- Focke-Wulf Ta 183 Huckebein (intended for first prototypes only)
- Gotha Go 229
- Heinkel He 280
- Heinkel He 162A-8
- Henschel Hs 132
- Horten H.IX
- Junkers Ju 287 (first and second prototypes; intended for the fourth prototype as well as the Ju 287 A-2 and B-1 production versions)
- Lavochkin La-150 (RD-10)
- Messerschmitt Bf 110: Flying engine test-bed.
- Messerschmitt Me 262
- OKB-1 EF 131: Equipped with the Soviet-made RD-10 copy of the Jumo 004
- Yakovlev Yak-Jumo: precursor to the Yakovlev Yak-15 powered with captured 004s

== Surviving engines ==
A number of examples of the Jumo 004 turbojet exist in aviation museums and historical collections in North America, Europe and Australia, including;

- Aeronautical Museum Belgrade, one Jumo 004
- Australian National Aviation Museum, Moorabbin Airport, Melbourne, Victoria, Australia; ANAM displays a single detached Jumo 004
- Deutsches Museum, Munich, Germany; The museum displays a Jumo 004B, built in 1944
- The Imperial War Museum Duxford, Cambridge, United Kingdom; Displays a sectioned Jumo 004 engine.
- Luftfahrt-Museum Laatzen-Hannover, Hannover, Germany; Offering the pre-production model Jumo 004A and a cutaway model of the later Jumo 004B besides a diverse collection of aircraft.
- National Air and Space Museum (NASM) of the Smithsonian Institution, Washington D.C., USA; NASM is in possession of two Jumo 004s, a complete engine (on display as of 2020) and a 'cutaway' engine (not on display or is in storage as of 2020)
- National Museum of the United States Air Force, Wright-Patterson Air Force Base, Dayton, Ohio, USA; NMUSAF displays one detached Jumo 004, along with one of the few surviving Me 262s (which still retains its two 004 engines)
- New England Air Museum, Bradley International Airport, Windsor Locks, CT, USA; NEAM displays a 'cutaway' engine on-loan from the NMUSAF.
- The Flying Heritage & Combat Armor Museum, located at Paine Field in Everett, Washington is currently restoring an Me 262 and its accompanying Jumo 004 engines to airworthy condition. The 004s have been re-tooled to allow for greater fatigue resistance and, therefore, a longer overall engine life. As of October 2019, the restored 262 has successfully performed taxiway testing under the power of its 004 engines
- The South African Air Force Museum, located at Ysterplaat, Cape Town. Partly sectioned Jumo 004

== Specifications (Jumo 004B) ==
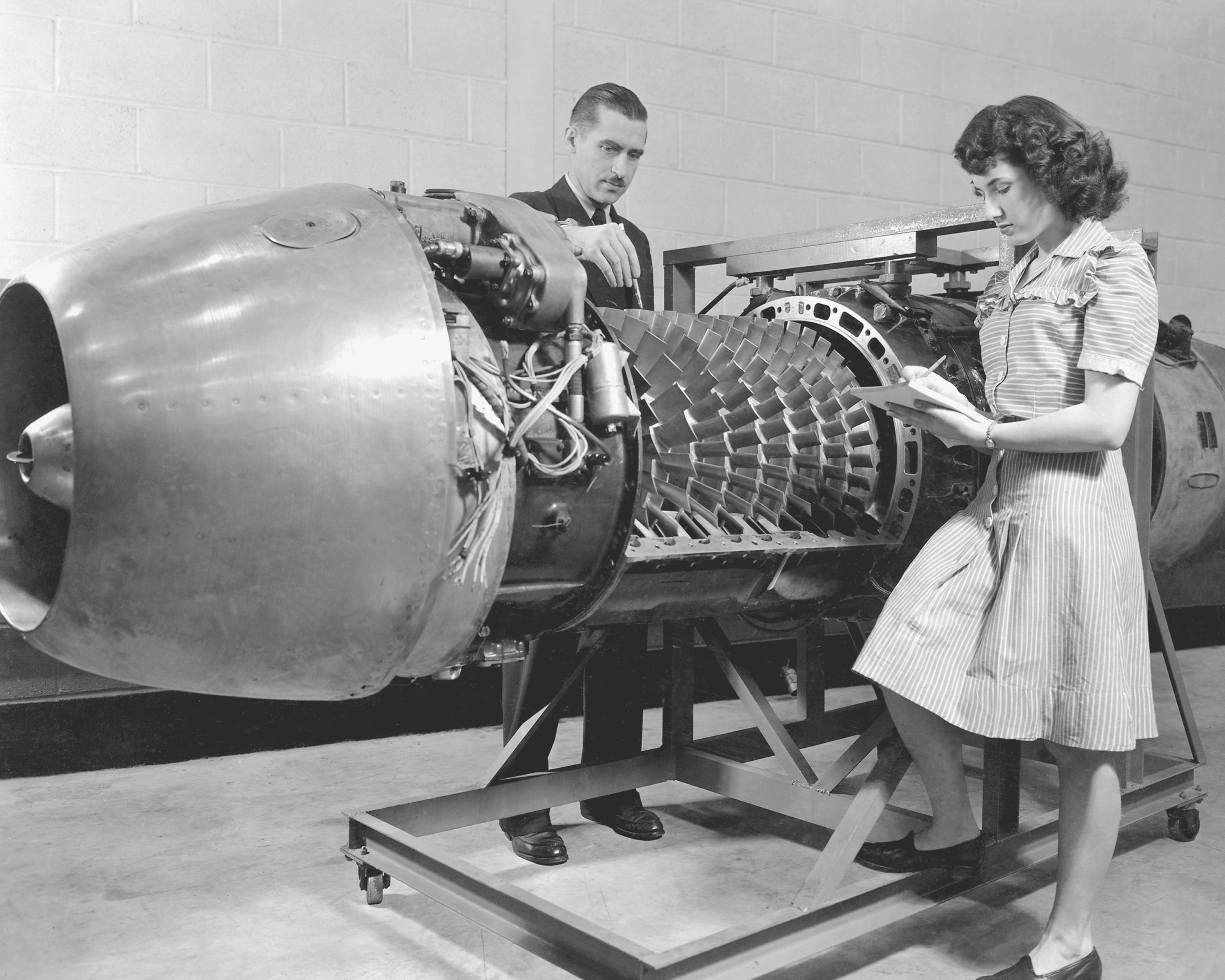
A Jumo 004 engine is being investigated by Aircraft Engine Research Laboratory engineers of the National Advisory Committee for Aeronautics in 1946

Data from

==== General characteristics ====
- Type: Turbojet
- Length: 3860 mm (152 in)
- Diameter: 813 mm (32 in)
- Dry weight: 719 kg (1,585 lb)

==== Components ====
- Compressor: 8-stage axial compressor
- Combustors: 6 chamber can-type
- Turbine: 1-stage axial

==== Performance ====
- Maximum thrust: 8.8 kN (1,980 lbf) at 8,700 rpm
- Overall pressure ratio: 3.14:1
- Thrust-to-weight ratio: 1.25

== See also ==
Comparable engines

- Armstrong Siddeley ASX
- BMW 003
- Heinkel HeS 011
- Ishikawajima Ne-20
- Lockheed J37 – first American axial-flow jet engine design attempt
- Metropolitan-Vickers F.2
- Westinghouse J30 – first operable American axial-flow jet engine (1943)

Related lists

- List of aircraft engines
- List of aircraft engines of Germany during World War II
