= Max Bentele =

German-born mechanical engineer (1909–2006)

- Bentele's Autobiography
- Born: January 15, 1909; Ulm, German Empire
- Died: May 19, 2006 (aged 97); New York City, United States
- Education: University of Stuttgart
- Occupations: Mechanical engineer and designer
- Known for: "Father" of the Wankel engine

Max Bentele (January 15, 1909 – May 19, 2006) was a German-born pioneer in the field of jet aircraft turbines and mechanical engineering. His contributions to the development of the Wankel engine earned him the title, "Father of the Wankel Engine in the United States".

== Bentele in Germany ==
Bentele had been fascinated with engineering from an early age and graduated from the Technical University of Stuttgart in the fall of 1928 with a degree in mechanical and electrical engineering. Up until World War II he was working on turbine blade design for the Heinkel-Hirth, Germany's new jet engine. Bentele excelled at this task, and after the war he managed one of Heinkel-Hirth's few remaining machine shops, which had survived virtually unscathed. He excelled at this job and was approached to undertake the design and manufacture of much needed spare parts for Allied Jeeps.

== Bentele in the United States ==
Bentele left his successful business at the request of the Americans and British in order to study and repair damaged German jet aircraft. Bentele successfully built twelve new aircraft for this purpose. While it is believed that he was interrogated at this time, Bentele made contacts which ultimately brought him to the United States.

Bentele temporarily returned to Heinkel-Hirth in Germany and established a moped business there. During this time he worked on turbine, and direct fuel injection, engines for such companies as Bosch, L'Orange, Daimler-Benz, and the British Ministry of Supply. Shortly thereafter he immigrated to the United States, where he worked for Curtiss-Wright, developing new technologies.

== Curtiss-Wright ==
Immediately after World War II, the Curtiss-Wright Corporation became a defense contractor supplying aircraft and aircraft engines. This American aircraft manufacturing company was directly descended from the business ventures of the Wright brothers and their fellow aviation pioneer Glenn Curtiss. In 1949, Roy Hurley became president of the company and sought keenly to acquire Bentele's services.

While Curtiss-Wright had once been one of the top aircraft and aircraft engine producers in the world, the company was slow to adopt the new turbojet engine, which began to dominate the market. There was simply no more tinkering that could be done to improve Curtiss's engines—a complete overhaul was necessary. Curtiss needed a new engine, if it were to compete for government contracts, which dominated the market.

=== The Wankel engine ===
Although Bentele did not have the proper government clearance—an issue which may have hindered him—he worked to his full potential and achieved results. In 1958, Roy Hurley acquired the Studebaker-Packard Corporation, and it was soon discovered that German automobile and engine producer NSU had been working on a remarkable engine concept: the Wankel rotary engine of Felix Wankel. Security surrounding this project was surprisingly lax for such a revolutionary invention, and it was even arranged for Bentele to study a model on his own, exploring the potential further development and production of such an engine at Curtiss-Wright. After a long weekend, Bentele emerged more than impressed with the project and became an admirer of a fellow mechanist Felix Wankel.

=== Chief Scientist ===
Bentele was one of several British, German and Swiss engineers that had recently been hired by Curtiss-Wright to broaden their line in engines. Bentele, when he went to Curtiss-Wright, was assigned, as a "Chief Scientist," to assist the large number of Engineering Section Heads that carried out the design, development, testing, and analysis for production engines and experimental engines. Bentele, who was well qualified to help solve existing problems, was soon unwelcome at the various Section Head offices. There were several reasons for this less-than-enthusiastic acceptance, part of it being Bentele's energetic approach. Bentele may not have been properly coordinated into the largely independent Engineering and Research Departments. Hurley, by his own admission, was a "jackknife engineer" and did not come up through Engineering. Also Bentele was not modest, when he visited each office to review their technical problems: he generally concluded, "in Germany, we did it this way", which was interpreted as arrogant. Soon all doors were closed—with one exception:

=== Charles Jones ===
The youngest Section Head at Curtiss-Wright at that time, Charles Jones, was head of the Stress and Applied Mechanics Section, responsible for the structural integrity of Curtiss-Wright engines. Jones had a staff of 30 engineers, almost all with advanced degrees, but still had to put in an inordinate number of hours to keep up. He was delighted to have Bentele's experience, similar to that of Jones' but far more extensive, available to him. Bentele became a steady visitor, even before any Wankel issues came up. Therefore, it was quite natural for Bentele to ask Jones if he would try to develop the Wankel engine basic formulae (dimensions, dynamics, accelerations, velocities, vibrations, etc.) on weekends. Jones, already loaded on weekends, was intrigued and agreed. Within a few weekends Jones delivered the formulae and analyses to Bentele.

=== Patents ===
Curtiss-Wright, led by Roy Hurley, determined that rotary engine technology would provide the comeback they needed. The Germans were very familiar with and respectful of Bentele and he was a great asset to Curtiss-Wright. Unexpectedly, NSU, who held patents and rights to the Wankel-derived engine in many countries, failed to patent their engine in the United States, due to complex patent laws, and to their lawyer who was unfamiliar with these laws.

Eventually, a deal was made that allowed Curtiss-Wright to gain a license on Wankel's technology, and this changed history. On October 21, 1958, Curtiss-Wright became the first company to purchase a license, for $2.1 million, and a 5% commission on all engines sold. Although Curtiss was forced to share major technological developments, Curtiss was the sole license holder of Wankel's technology in the United States.

=== Review of the Wankel engine ===
In 1958 Bentele was asked by Hurley to review the potential and, if promising, to head up the R&D program on the Wankel rotary engine. Bentele told Jones that Hurley had asked him to review the prospects for the Wankel, and that he would depart for Germany and France (for the Planche rotary compressor experiments in France) to further check out related efforts, and review work at the Wankel Institute. He asked Jones to give up his present assignment and, working alone and in secret, at an offsite location, to make a theoretical evaluation of the engine's requirements and potential.

Jones agreed and, a month later, Jones handed Bentele a thick volume containing the calculations. Jones had predicted major performance factors including heat rejection, fuel efficiency, power, size, etc. and concluded that certain design changes to cooling, structure, bearings, dynamic inversion, etc. had to be made to the "proof of concept" rigs that Wankel and NSU had built and briefly run, before the concept would be proven.

=== Modifications ===
The sealing elements were too fragile, as designed by Wankel, but the basic principle of using a pressure actuated cylindrical pin at each apex of the rotor was recognized. Making the trochoid profile "oversized", by the radius of the apex seal tip, was recognized as essential to seal, in three planes, and this was retained unchanged, but made heavier initially, and later changed to more rugged Curtiss-Wright patented designs that still retained the cylindrical pin.

Shortly thereafter, the 'OK to proceed' was given, even though the license agreement had not yet been sealed. A completely separate engineering unit was formed, drawing the best from every department. All personnel were told that the work they did at the separate building was not to be discussed outside that building.

Jones was assigned by Bentele to design the basic single rotor 60 cu. in. module and later, a two rotor (with & without center bearing) version, which became the workhorse for automotive, airplanes, silent "spy" aircraft, generator, automotive, inboard boat, and other engines for Curtiss-Wright, and the licensees that followed in the U.S. and elsewhere. Other groups were assigned to scale the single rotor engine up by the square root of 10 for potentially 1000 Hp/rotor, make a 4 rotor/integral shaft with split gears and bearings version for marine use,

=== The Wankel project becomes known to the public ===
Bentele started from first principles, running research and development programs in the country, beginning with mathematical formulae and solutions to problems before physically touching the engine.

Bentele's work on the engine was top secret, however word leaked to the public and it became common knowledge that Curtiss was developing a Wankel engine. The public was not familiar with the new engine, but rumors spread regarding the engine's immense potential. When Curtiss went public with this information, NSU was angry, claiming that Bentele and Curtiss were trying to present the Wankel as a product of American ingenuity, and that they were denying any German involvement. The dispute was short-lived.

As development continued throughout the early 1960s, Hurley and Curtiss were accused of fraudulent activity, as stocks soared. There was no actual product on the market at the time.

== Father of the Wankel Engine in the United States ==
Bentele and his team studied the concepts of the Wankel rotary engine and started to design a prototype before the license was granted, settling on a 60 cubic inches (980 cm^{3}) design using most of Wankel's original geometric sealing designs in the DKM54 model. In its first dyno test in 1959, the new model, dubbed the IRC6, provided a spectacular performance of 100 bhp at 5500 rpm, which was impressive for such a small engine design.

Bentele and Jones then proceeded to design a custom cooling system that surpassed NSU's, with increased engine performance and reliability. Extensive experimentation continued, following Bentele's orders, on nearly every aspect of the engine's design, the process taking several years and continuing after Bentele had left Curtiss-Wright. Output was gradually increased, as was the general size of the engine. The late RC2-60 engine was tested in a 1966 Ford Mustang and performed well, providing similar performance to the Mustang's original V8 with less fuel consumption, noise and vibration, and physical size. The engine was also emission tested in a study by Curtiss-Wright and the University of Michigan in a Ford Galaxy; GM and AMC also tested rotary engines in their vehicles but did not publish findings.

=== A new model ===
In November 1962, Bentele and his team developed a larger 425 horsepower (317 kW) four-rotor variant of the RC2-60 called the 4RC-6 for heavy duty and potential use in aircraft. It was the first multi-rotor Wankel engine built and was a technological masterpiece.

=== Leaving Curtiss-Wright ===
Through most of his career at Curtiss-Wright, which ended in May, 1967, when he went to Avco-Lycoming, Bentele was responsible for developing Wankel engine technology more than anyone, perhaps including Dr. Wankel himself. And although Curtiss-Wright amassed a large number of patented Wankel engine designs and design improvements, none of these engines were ever produced for the market by Curtiss-Wright, for complex corporate reasons. But they were used in commercially produced applications by licensees in the U.S. and abroad. John Deere was given the license for a nominal fee of $14 million, hoping to utilize such technology in its manufacture of farming and commercial equipment; nevertheless Bentele's work lives on in every Wankel engine produced around the world, as this technology was utilized by many manufacturers both in America and worldwide.

== Impact ==
Bentele's knowledge of turbine jets contributed to the successful development of American jet airplanes, which immediately dominated the field. Much of what we know today about these engines originated with Bentele.

Although the unique rotary engine was designed by Felix Wankel, the commercial success and worldwide applications of these engines were largely achieved by Bentele. Today compact and efficient rotary engines have commercial applications in automobiles, notably in Mazda sports and racing cars. Toyo Kogyo Kaisha, Limited (dba Mazda Motor Corporation) was one of the first to acquire a license for the Wankel in July 1960 (later ratified by the Japanese Government in July 1961) and spent many years refining the design. Rotary engines are also found in marine craft, and small custom airplanes, built by enthusiasts and small aircraft companies.

Bentele revolutionized the field of corporate engineering, research and development, and was chair of the SAE until his death on May 19, 2006. One of the most prestigious engineering awards, given by the SAE, is named after him.
