= Russian Air Force Day =

Russian military holiday

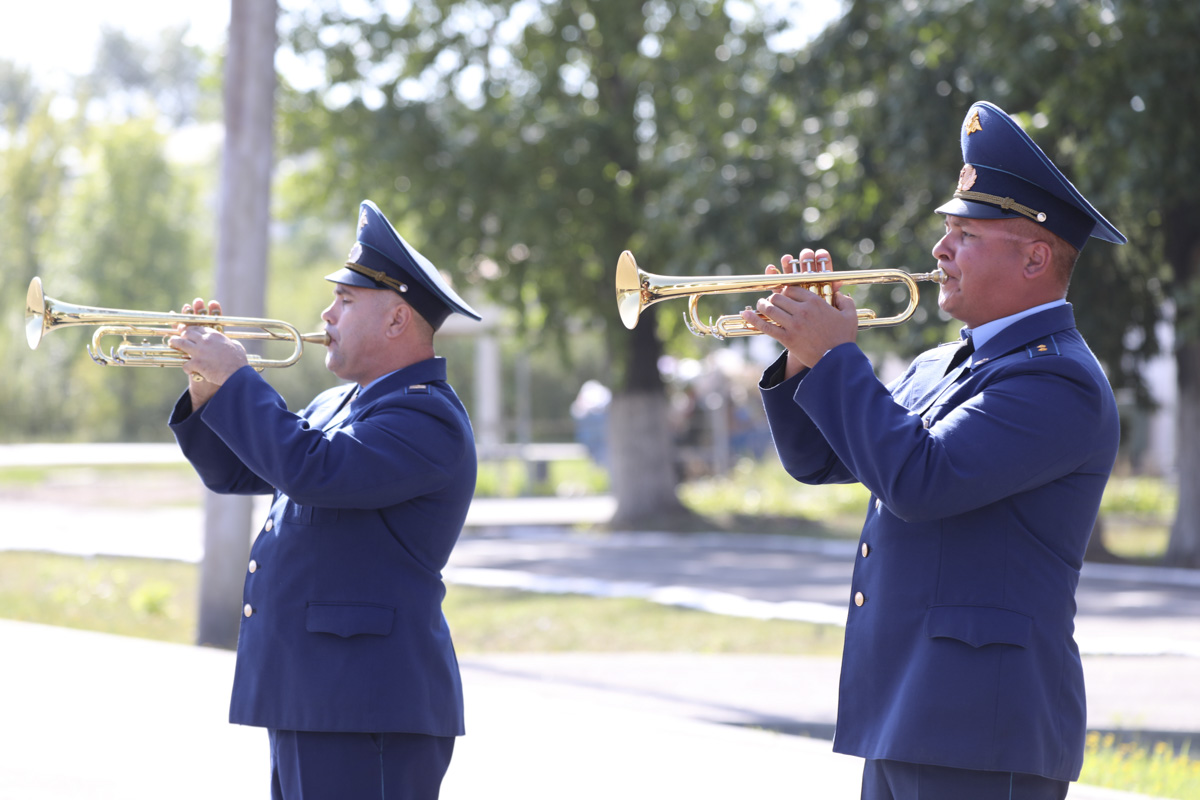
- Members of Russian military bands on Air Force Day in 2020
- Official name: День Военно-воздушных сил
- Observed by: Russia
- Type: National
- Celebrations: Parades, Fireworks, Rallies
- Date: August 12
- Frequency: Annual

Russian Air Force Day (Russian: День Военно-воздушных сил, romanized: Den Voyenno-vozdushnykh) is a professional military holiday of Russia celebrated on 12 August to honor the active and reserve personnel, as well as veterans of the Russian Aerospace Forces.

== History ==
Air Fleet Day (Russian: День Воздушного Флота, romanized: Den Vozdushnogo Flota), also known as the Air Forces Day or Soviet Aviation Day was established in 1933 and was celebrated on the third Sunday of August. The first aviation exhibition was held on 18 August 1933, at the initiative of Yakov Alksnis at Moscow's Khodynka Aerodrome. Future air parades were held at Tushino Airfield, where they remained for decades. In 1937, the parade was attended by nearly a million people,

Soviet Air Force Day was enshrined by decree of the Presidium of the Supreme Soviet on 1 October 1980. On 28 September 1992, the Presidium of the Supreme Soviet of Russia fixed this date as Russian Air Force Day. The modern holiday was introduced to the Russian Armed Forces by President Vladimir Putin on 31 May 2006. The date was chosen based on the fact that 12 August 1912 marks the anniversary of the establishment of the Imperial Russian Air Service, which was formerly part of the Engineer Corps. 12 August is today considered to be the birthday of Russian military aviation.

== Celebrations ==
Festive events dedicated to the holiday are held annually. Air shows are commonly held at Zhukovsky Airport. Solemn events are held at the Moscow House of War and Armed Forces Veterans. The 2012 Air Force Day celebrations marked the centennial of Russian military aviation, being attended by President Vladimir Putin.

== Gallery ==
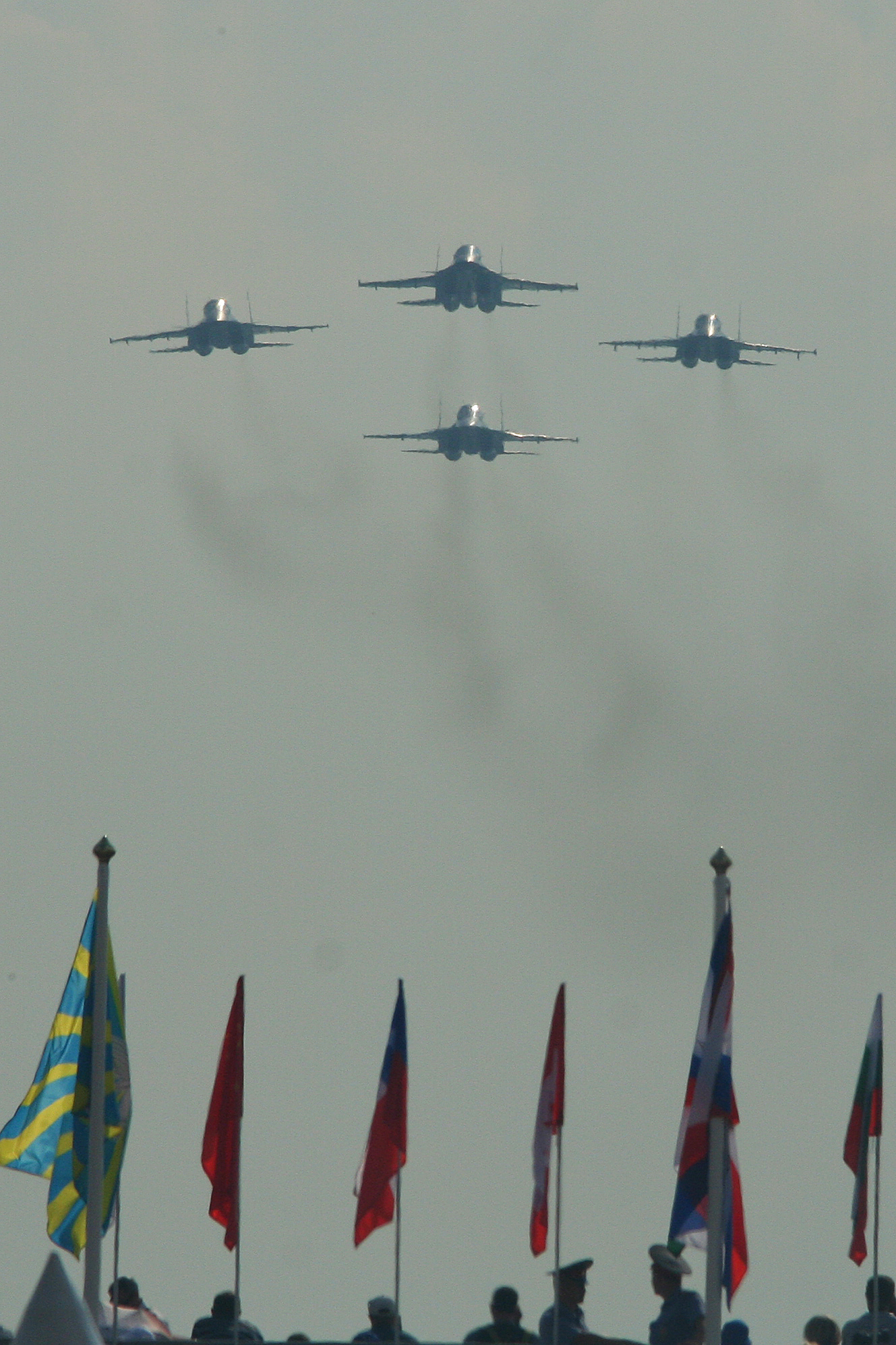
Su-34s flying over Zhukovsky Airbase in 2012.

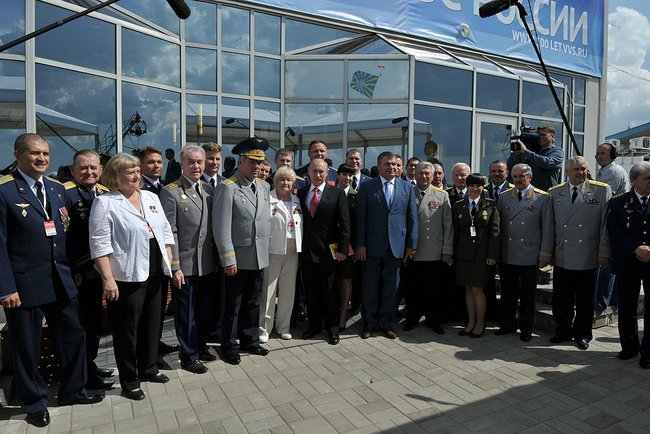
Vladimir Putin with Air Force veterans after the flypast.

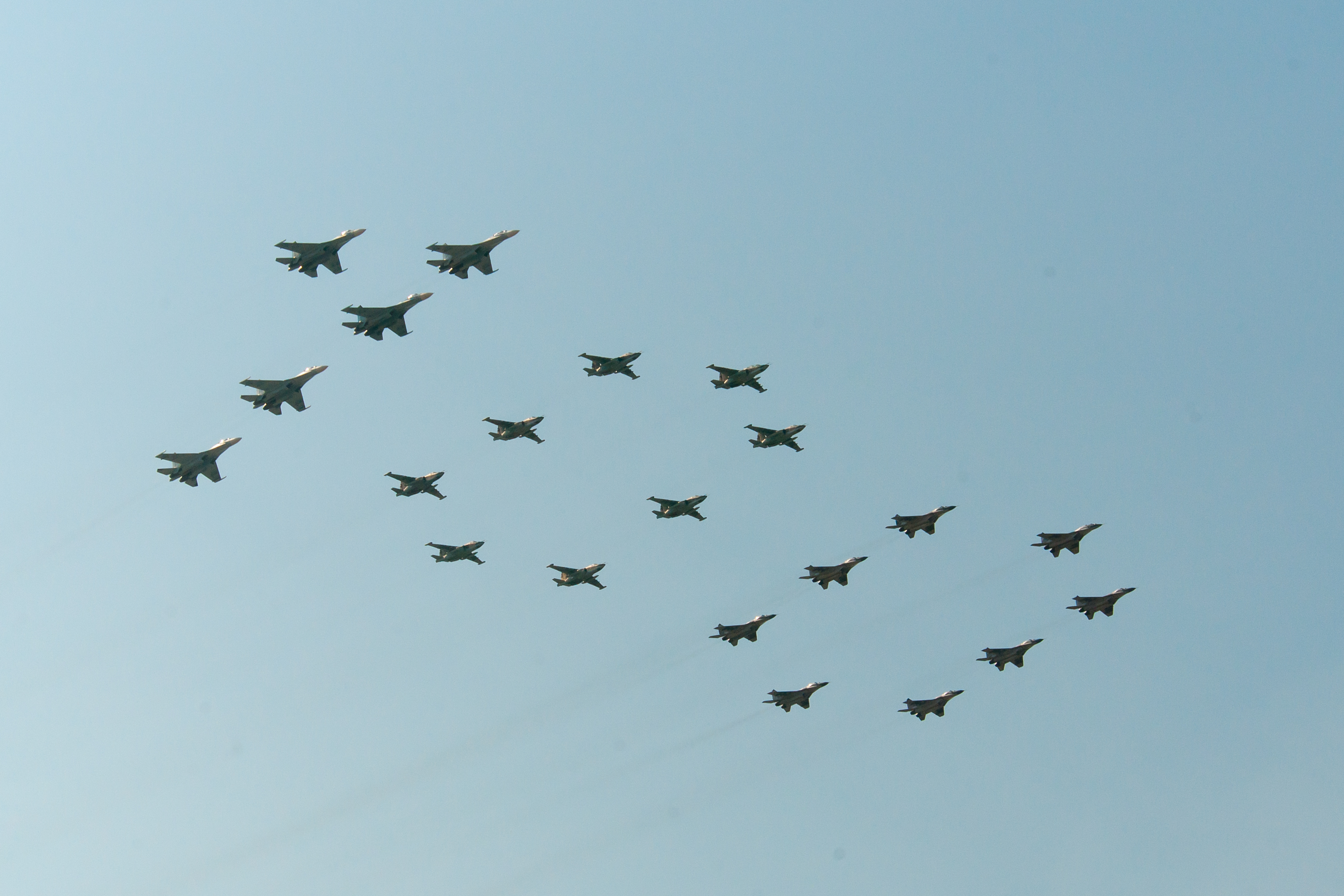
Su-27SM3, Su-25SM and MiG-29 crews perform at an air show in honour of the 100th anniversary of the Russian Air Force in Zhukovsky, August 12, 2012

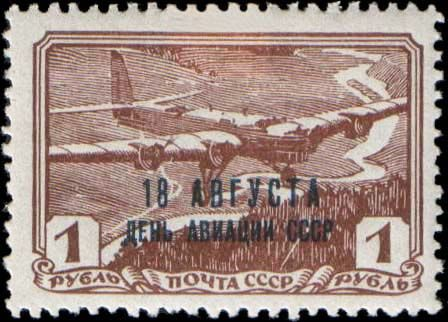
A stamp in honour of Air Fleet Day in 1939.

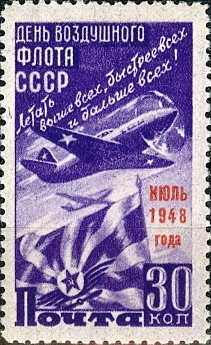
A stamp in honor of Air Fleet Day in 1948.

== See also ==
- Navy Day (Russia)
- Defender of the Fatherland Day
- Paratroopers' Day
- Cosmonautics Day
