= Lavochkin La-150 =

Soviet early jet fighter by Lavochkin

La-150

General information
- Type: Jet fighter
- Manufacturer: Lavochkin
- Designer: Semyon Lavochkin
- Status: Project cancelled
- Primary user: Soviet Air Force
- Number built: 8

History
- First flight: 11 September 1946
- Developed into: Lavochkin La-152

The Lavochkin La-150 (also known as the Izdeliye 150 – Aircraft or Article 150, (Note: All Lavochkin's jet aircraft were referred to in-house, and at government level, as "Izdeliye 150", etc.) USAF/DOD designation Type 3), was designed by the Lavochkin design bureau (OKB) in response to a 1945 order to build a single-seat jet fighter using a single German turbojet. By this time both the Americans and British, as well as the Germans, had already flown jet fighters and the single Soviet jet engine under development (the Lyulka TR-1) was not yet ready for production. The design was completed quickly, but the construction of the five flying prototypes was protracted by the factory's inexperience in building metal aircraft. The aircraft made its first flight in September 1946, but proved to require extensive modifications to meet the Soviet Air Forces' requirements. These took so long to make and test that the aircraft was essentially obsolete by the time that they were completed. Even one variant with a much more powerful engine was inferior to other aircraft that the OKB had under development and all work was terminated in 1947.

== Design and development ==
The Lavochkin OKB was ordered to design a fighter using a single Junkers Jumo 004B axial-flow turbojet in February 1945. Much like their rivals at the Mikoyan-Gurevich OKB with their MiG-9, the OKB chose a "pod-and-boom" layout for their new fighter, based on advice from the Central Aerohydrodynamic Institute (TsAGI), although their design had a shoulder-mounted wing. The wings of the all-metal aircraft had fixed leading edges and slotted flaps. The cockpit was well forward, giving the pilot good visibility, and he was protected by an armored headrest. The windscreen of the teardrop-shaped canopy was also armored. Two 23-millimetre (0.91 in) Nudelman-Suranov NS-23 autocannon were mounted on the lower side of the fuselage with 75 rounds per gun. The tricycle landing gear retracted into the fuselage which gave the 150 a very narrow track. The Soviet derivative of the Jumo engine, the RD-10, was rated at 900 kilograms-force (8.8 kN; 2,000 lbf) and was mounted behind the cockpit. A steel heat shield protected the bottom of the rear fuselage from the engine's exhaust. Air was supplied by an intake in the aircraft nose that split around the cockpit before reaching the engine. Seven tanks, five in the fuselage and one in each wing, carried a total of 500 kilograms (1,100 lb) of fuel.

Construction of a full-scale mockup was completed in June 1945 by Factory No. 81, but the order for five prototypes was given to Factory No. 381 as Factory No. 81 was already fully committed to other programs. Manufacturing drawings were delivered to Factory No. 381 by the end of August, but the prototypes were delayed because the plant had no experience building metal aircraft and lacked the necessary tooling. By the end of the year, the factory had only managed to complete a single airframe for static load testing. This showed that the rear fuselage, wings and tail needed to be reinforced, and the opportunity was taken to enlarge the vertical stabilizer as well. These tests and modifications required six months of work so that the first flying prototype was not completed until July 1946. Manufacturer's testing of the first prototype began on 27 August, after ground testing had required replacing the engine twice, and the first flight was made on 11 September.

The following day, the Council of Ministers ordered that a small batch of jets from each OKB were to participate in the 7 November parade commemorating the October Revolution. Because of the tight deadline, the components for the two incomplete prototypes were turned over to Factory No. 301 at Khimki, the new headquarters for the Lavochkin OKB, for assembly by Factory No. 381. Factory No. 21 in Gorky joined the program with three more aircraft built in record time with support from Factory No. 301. Tooling was constructed in 5–10 days with the first aircraft completed in a week and a half.

=== Testing and evaluation ===
All eight aircraft were complete by 1 November and had been tested to ensure their readiness to participate in the parade. They were later given the unofficial service designation of La-13. It was considered too risky to fly the aircraft from Gorky to Moscow and their wings could not be dismounted which meant that they could not be railed to Moscow either. Special three-wheeled trailers were built and the aircraft were driven to Moscow, but the flypast was cancelled because of bad weather.

The tests conducted in preparation for the parade revealed a number of flaws in the design including poor directional stability, a cramped cockpit without heating or ventilation, poor access to the engine, inadequate fuel capacity, compounded by the lack of a fuel gauge, and poor elevator control forces. Five aircraft were modified to correct these issues before resuming the factory's testing in late 1946. The modifications were not entirely successful and the lateral stability was now too great and the elevator forces remained too weak. Engine problems, however, plagued the tests as the first prototype alone required four engine changes.

After the conclusion of the manufacturer's trials in April 1947, one aircraft was returned to the factory for extensive modifications as the 150M. The wing tips were angled downward 35° to reduce the lateral stability, the wing was redesigned to detach from the fuselage, and the aerodynamic balancing of the elevators was reduced from 24% to 20%. The fuel capacity was increased to 660 kilograms (1,460 lb), the cockpit was widened by 80 centimeters (31 in) and fitted with an ejection seat. Fore and aft armor plates were fitted to protect the pilot and a new radio aerial mast was installed. All these changes added 365 kilograms (805 lb) of weight and increased drag which reduced the aircraft's top speed by 73 to 805 km/h (45 to 500 mph), and slowed its time to 5,000 meters (16,400 ft) from 4.8 to 7.2 minutes in comparison to the unmodified aircraft. Given that a higher-performance design, the Aircraft 156, had already been submitted for state acceptance trials, Semyon Lavochkin decided not to continue the development of the 150M.

In the meantime, the OKB had been developing two afterburning versions of the RD-10 in an effort to increase the engine's power. The more successful model was only 100 millimeters (3.9 in) longer and weighed an additional 31 kilograms (68 lb) more than the original engine. Its power, however, was increased by an additional 340 kilograms-force (3.3 kN; 750 lbf), over 30% more thrust. This engine was designated the izdeliye YuF by the bureau (Note: Confusingly, some sources refer to both this engine and Yakovlev's afterburning version of the RD-10 as RD-10Fs, although they had two different afterburner designs.) and was fitted into an aircraft 150 prototype in July 1947, designated as the 150F. The additional power increased the aircraft's top speed to 950 km/h (590 mph) at sea level and 915 km/h (569 mph) at an altitude of 4,320 meters (14,170 ft). This made the 150F the second-fastest Soviet fighter of the period, after the MiG-9 powered by two afterburning RD-21 engines. Nevertheless, Lavochkin decided not to submit the 150F for state acceptance trials as the fundamental design flaws of the airframe still had not been resolved.

== Operators ==
Soviet Union

- Soviet Air Force

== Variants ==
- 150M – One 150 prototype was modified with drooped wingtips, a wider cockpit and extra fuel.
- 150F – One 150 prototype was modified with an Izdeliye YuF engine, an afterburning RD-10.

== Specifications (Aircraft 150) ==

Data from Early Soviet Jet Fighters

General characteristics

- Crew: 1
- Length: 9.42 m (30 ft 11 in)
- Wingspan: 8.2 m (26 ft 11 in)
- Height: 2.6 m (8 ft 6 in)
- Wing area: 12.15 m^{2} (130.8 sq ft)
- Airfoil: root: TsAGI 12%; tip: TsAGI 9.5%
- Empty weight: 2,156 kg (4,753 lb)
- Gross weight: 2,973 kg (6,554 lb)
- Powerplant: 1 × RD-10 turbojet engine, 8.8 kN (2,000 lbf) thrust

Performance

- Maximum speed: 878 km/h (546 mph, 474 kn)
- Range: 493 km (306 mi, 266 nmi)
- Service ceiling: 12,600 m (41,300 ft)
- Rate of climb: 22.1 m/s (4,350 ft/min)
- Wing loading: 244.6 kg/m^{2} (50.1 lb/sq ft)
- Thrust/weight: 0.303

Armament

- Guns: 2 × 23 mm Nudelman-Suranov NS-23 autocannon with 75 rpg

== See also ==
- Lavochkin La-152
- Lavochkin La-156

Aircraft of comparable role, configuration, and era

- Mikoyan-Gurevich MiG-9

Related lists

- List of military aircraft of the Soviet Union and the CIS

== Bibliography ==
- Gordon, Yefim. Early Soviet Jet Fighters. Hinckley, UK: Midland Publishing, 2002. ISBN 1-85780-139-3.
- Gunston, Bill. The Osprey Encyclopedia of Russian Aircraft 1875–1995. London: Osprey, 1995. ISBN 1-85532-405-9.
