= Soviet grain procurement crisis of 1928 =

Pivotal economic event

The Soviet grain procurement crisis of 1928, sometimes referred to as "the crisis of NEP," was a pivotal economic event which took place in the Soviet Union beginning in January 1928 during which the quantities of wheat, rye, and other cereal crops made available for purchase by the state fell to levels regarded by planners as inadequate to support the needs of the country's urban population. Failure of the state to make successful use of the price system to generate sufficient grain sales was met with a regimen of increasingly harsh administrative sanctions against the Soviet peasantry. The state of national emergency which followed led to the termination of the New Economic Policy and spurred a move towards the collectivization of agriculture in 1929.

== History ==
=== Background ===
The Russian Revolution of November 1917 ushered in a period of civil war and economic dislocation, in which the ruling All-Union Communist Party (bolsheviks) (VKP) made use of forced grain requisitions (Russian: prodrazvyorstka), trading to the peasantry currency with little purchasing power for an underdeveloped consumer goods market. Viewed by most Soviet contemporaries as a temporary wartime expedient, this system of "War Communism" was extremely unpopular with Russia's grain-producing peasantry and the cause of a massive wave of unrest and revolts that threatened to fatally destabilize the government.

This force-based system of War Communism was abandoned in the spring of 1921 with the adoption of the so-called "New Economic Policy" (NEP), under which a stable, gold-based currency was restored and a return made to the market system. Instead of forced requisitions of all marketable surpluses, a food tax (Russian: prodnalog) was implemented which necessitated peasant households providing a limited portion of their production to the state, after which households would be free to sell its remaining surplus not needed for household survival on the open market. By 1924 this system of prodnalog had been replaced by a money tax, with Soviet state grain requisitions accomplished via buying and selling.

Although the return to the market system in agriculture was ideologically problematic for many Bolsheviks, the years from 1922 to 1926 were successful in practical terms, with total agricultural production by the peasant-based economy fully returning to pre-revolutionary levels. Production of cereal grains approximated pre-war figures, potato production greatly exceeded such figures, and livestock populations, gravely affected during the war, returned to normalcy for pigs and sheep while the count of horses was slowly and steadily restored.

The period of War Communism saw Soviet cities largely depopulated when former peasants returned en masse to their native villages amidst the ongoing economic collapse. This trend was reversed under NEP and industrial facilities were restored and restarted, approaching the pre-war levels of output during the second half of the 1920s. Further growth of the economy and improvement of living conditions, it was felt by Soviet planners, would require new investment in factory facilities and capital goods. With access to world capital markets severely restricted to the revolutionary Soviet regime, these funds that would need to be generated by the state either through a loosening of the backing of the gold-based currency, a raising in the level of taxation of the largely rural population, or some combination of these factors.

Communist Party penetration of the countryside remained weak, amounting to an average of 1 rural Communist for every 6 village soviets — a mere 0.52% of the rural population vs. 1.78% of the total population in 1927. Moreover, these rural Communists, who took leading roles in village soviets and cooperatives, included a disproportionate number of comparatively well-to-do peasants — a social group, party and non-party, which dominated local administration. This persistent strength of so-called "kulaks" in the Soviet countryside further contributed to the dissatisfaction with the economic status quo on the part of many members of the largely urban Communist Party.

From the end of 1926 demand among planners and party activists for a new program of mass industrialization that would modernize the largely peasant country. Although NEP was seen at the time as a permanent structure throughout 1927, the 15th Congress of the VKP(b), held in Moscow in December 1927, acceded to this sentiment, approving a new program for the industrialization of the USSR — an acceleration which would ultimately prove incompatible with a small peasantry freely exchanging a comparatively small fraction of its production in the marketplace.

Collectivization of agriculture was held by the Communists to be the essential corollary of any successful industrial campaign, it being faithfully maintained that collective organization would eliminate the inefficiencies inherent in capitalist agriculture, thereby expanding production and making a greater quantity of grain available to the state for conversion to capital goods.

=== Goods shortage ===
Throughout the early years of the Russian revolution the peasantry faced a shortage of basic farm and household items, including agricultural implements, construction material, cloth, and finished consumer goods. This marked a continuation of the wartime situation, in which industrial production had been moved from a consumer orientation to fulfillment of the military needs of the state in the war against the German empire. The Bolshevik regime had never been able to catch up with pent up demand, and state and cooperative supplies remained spotty, while the prices demanded by private traders remained high.

A so-called Scissors Crisis had developed in the early years of the New Economic Policy as prices of consumer goods escalated while market prices of agricultural products fell. Early in 1927 the Communist Party decided to address the disparity by lowering the selling prices of industrial goods by approximately 10%. Although this pricing decision was meant to undercut the high prices charged by private traders, in practice it only exacerbated the miserable supply situation as goods were snapped up from the market, leaving the inventories of state supply agents barren. Those goods which were available tended to be committed to larger towns, located along railway lines, rather than to smaller villages deep in the countryside.

The net result of this situation was a goods famine that provided an inadequate incentive for peasants to participate in grain sales to state grain purchasing agents, who had little of practical value to offer the peasantry in exchange.

=== Emergence of the crisis ===
The Soviet economic year (October 1 to September 30) 1925/26 had generated state grain procurement of 8.4 million tons. This was far exceeded in 1926/27, when a post-revolutionary record harvest of 76.8 million tons resulted in a state procurement of 10.6 million tons at stable prices. No upward price adjustment had been necessary owing to the massive size of the harvest, which resulted in a supply glut. Expectations for the coming year were raised accordingly, with planned procurement for the coming economic year 1927/28 exceeding quantities obtained during the previous year of record harvest.

In addition to planned establishment of a new state grain reserve of 819,000 tons, economic planners sought increased quantities of grain for export to the European market as a means of generating the foreign currency needed for purchase of capital goods from abroad.

Calls for an official policy of centrally-planned industrialization had emanated from the Left Opposition headed by Leon Trotsky throughout the middle 1920s, with an explicit criticism levied in a September 1927 program of a "frank and open drift to the Right," to accommodation with the most wealthy segment of the peasantry to the detriment of national industrialization and further development of a socialist economy. This demand was easy to ignore when grain was readily available to the state on the market and unused factory capacity remained to be restarted. However, late in 1927 the pervasive optimism associated with the boom period of NEP began to dissipate.

A severe slump in state grain collections began in October 1927, following the new harvest of wheat and rye. This trend continued in November and December, with planned total procurements for the quarter of 7 million tons missed by a massive 2.1 million tons. This quantity was not only insufficient for creation of the planned grain reserve and the meeting of export targets, but was viewed by planners as insufficient for the feeding of the nation's cities and the members of the Red Army. Reasons for the decline set off a fierce debate in the ranks of the VKP(b). Party leader Joseph Stalin depicted the shortfall as political in nature, the result of "sabotage" by the rich peasantry in an effort to force the state to raise grain procurement prices. This Stalin likened to blackmail — forcing the state to abandon its industrialization plans in favor of filling their own pockets with the proceeds of sales to the market. Stalin's joint leader of the party during previous years, Nikolai Bukharin, regarded this perspective as a "fairy tale," instead arguing that rather than hoarding and speculation the cause of grain supply difficulties was a poor harvest, combined with insufficiently attractive procurement prices that deterred sales to state grain collectors.

The crisis in grain collections caused a split of the top leadership of the Communist Party, with a majority of party activists rallying around Stalin, who had now begun vigorously espousing the virtues of rapid industrialization previously associated with Trotsky and the Left Opposition. Only a minority supported Bukharin and his call for continued social peace between the state and the peasantry and his criticism of those who would "neglect a sense of moderation, to skip over necessary stages" on the slow and measured path to industrial development.

Stalin and the rapid industrializers retained effective control over the VKP(b), controlling 6 of 9 seats of the party's Political Bureau, which handled matters of day-to-day governance, with Bukharin able to muster the support of Alexei Rykov and Mikhail Tomsky in favor of a moderate pace of industrialization and social peace. Behind the scenes Stalin organized diligently, obliquely criticizing moderates in speeches to groups of party activists and with his new right-hand man, Viacheslav Molotov maintaining effective control of the official party daily newspaper, Pravda, and efforts being made to take over editorial control of the party's monthly theoretical magazine, Bolshevik.

== See also ==
- Collectivization in the Soviet Union
- Hyperinflation in early Soviet Russia
- Prodrazvyorstka
- Soviet War Scare (1926–27)
- Ural-Siberian method
