= EFW =

EFW may refer to:

- Economic Freedom of the World
- Energy-from-waste, see Waste-to-energy
- Jefferson Municipal Airport, in Jefferson, Iowa, IATA airport code EFW
- Electric Field and Wave experiment, a scientific instrument on the Cluster space mission
- Elbe Flugzeugwerke, a Dresden-based subsidiary of Airbus and ST Aerospace specialising in freighter and tanker conversion
