= Baade 152 =

East German jet passenger airliner

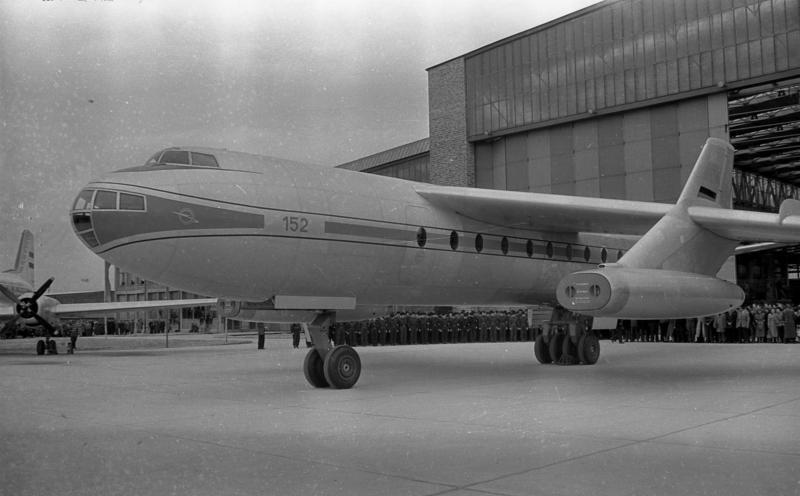
- Roll-out of "Baade 152" in Dresden on 30 April 1958

General information
- Type: Airliner
- Manufacturer: VEB Flugzeugwerke Dresden
- Status: Development terminated, never entered service
- Primary user: Deutsche Lufthansa (Intended)
- Number built: 2 flight prototypes + 1 completed that never flew. Several abandoned while under construction.

History
- First flight: 4 December 1958
- Retired: 1961
- Developed from: OKB-1 150

The Baade 152 also known as Dresden 152, VL-DDR 152 or simply 152, was a post-war airliner designed and manufactured by East German aircraft company VEB Flugzeugwerke Dresden. The aircraft was named after German aeronautical engineer Brunolf Baade, the principal designer involved in the programme. It was the first jet airliner to be developed in Germany.

The Baade 152 represents the final development in the Junkers aircraft family, which ended with the "development planes" (Entwicklungsflugzeug – EF). Its development drew upon the OKB-1 150, an aborted bomber that was developed in the Soviet Union with assistance from captured German scientists. The Baade 152's basic configuration shares many similarities, including shape, size, wing-area, landing gear configuration, empty weight, range, altitude, speed, power per engine, and double-engine cowling arrangement similar to the American-built Boeing B-47 Stratojet, a bomber/aerial reconnaissance aircraft which entered service with the United States Air Force during 1951. Work on the Baade 152 formally commenced during 1955.

On 4 December 1958, the maiden flight of the first prototype V1/I (DM-ZYA) took place. A total of three Baade 152s would be manufactured, two of which would participate in a test flight programme based out of Dresden Airport between 1956 and 1961. On 4 March 1959, the first prototype was lost in an accident, killing all crew on board; the cause is unclear. Testing continued using the second prototype. At one stage, there were reports that around 20 aircraft were in various stages of production on behalf of the East German state airline Deutsche Lufthansa. However, all flight tests of the Baade 152 were abandoned after a fuel supply problem was uncovered. The type failed to enter service, and production was terminated without any follow-on being produced.

== Design and development ==
=== Background ===
Following the end of the Second World War in Europe, Germany was divided into West Germany and East Germany. In the East, the Soviet Union became politically dominant over the region; Soviet officials sought to obtain all possible aerospace-related material in East Germany, the engineers and scientists associated with such projects were deported to the Soviet Union. During October 1946, it was announced that all East German aerospace-related projects would be transferred to the Soviet Union, while material that could not be transferred was deliberately destroyed. Following the formation of German Democratic Republic during 1949, many of the deported German scientists were allowed to return to East Germany and to practice their professions once more.

During 1952, new aeronautical facilities were established in East Germany; initially, these were operated with a focus upon military aircraft, however, following a popular uprising in the following year, military ambitions were renounced in favour of civil aircraft. The revival of the East German aerospace industry had occurred at a faster rate than that of neighbouring West Germany. Development of what would become known as the Baade 152 can be traced back as early as 1953 to a team of German aeronautical engineers headed by Brunolf Baade, for whom the type is named after, working in Zavyalovo, Russia. However, when members of the team were allowed to return to East Germany, all documentation relating to the 152 had to be left behind; the Soviets retained this cache and eventually released it to East Germany after a protracted period.

Based in East Germany, a new aerospace company, VEB Flugzeugwerke Dresden, was able to recruit Baade and several other returning engineers, and decided to commit itself to completing development of the envisaged 152. The plan was to develop the 152 as a four-engined commercial transport aircraft; an assembly line capable of producing up to 18 aircraft per year was to be established in Dresden to manufacture the type. The use of the Junkers site in Dessau was rejected for confidentiality reasons, as it was located underneath a West Berlin Air Corridor. As intended, the 152 would have been developed initially as a 57-seater airliner, plans were made to accommodate alternative seating layouts, such as a high-capacity 72-passenger configuration or a more spacious 42-passenger arrangement.

During 1955, VEB formally commenced work on the 152, having to effectively redesign the aircraft in the process. During the previous year, work had also commenced at Berlin-based Industriewerke Ludwigsfelde (IWL) on the development of the Pirna 014 turbojet engine; it was this powerplant that would be selected for the 152. According to Baade, work was hindered by a lack of optimal facilities present in East Germany. According to aviation periodical Flight International, East Germany was keen to involve Western industry in the project as well, particularly in the provision of components and materials; it was also hoped the sales of the 152 could be garnered from the west as well. Reportedly, East German officials regarded the 152 as filling a relatively unique niche upon the global airliner market, and that its nearest competitor was the French-built Sud Aviation Caravelle.

=== Testing and termination ===
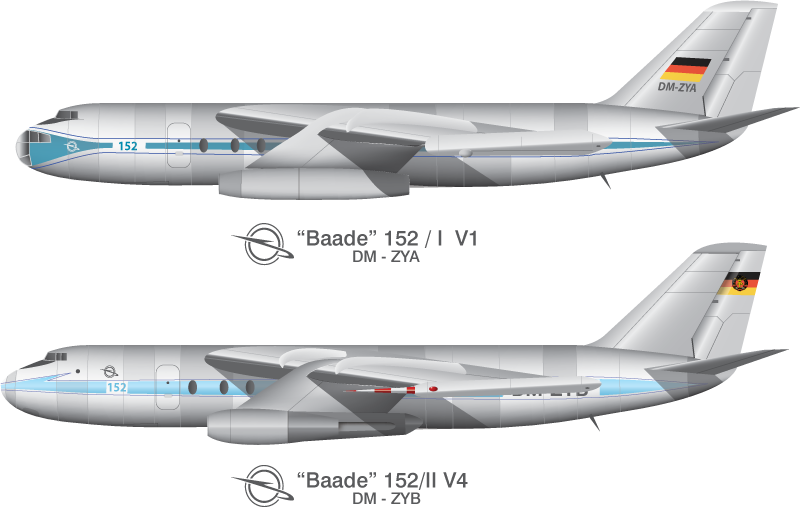
Sketch of the two prototype variants of the 152 that flew between 1958 and 1961

A total of three airworthy prototypes were constructed; two of them being flown on three flights. The design of the first prototype was largely derived from the OKB-1 150, an early jet bomber designed by former Junkers engineers in the Soviet Union. It included a tandem landing gear and glazed nose for the navigator, which was a common feature in many Eastern Bloc aircraft. The 152's landing gear was unusual for a passenger plane in that the main gear was housed along the centerline of the fuselage with outrigger wheels in the wing-tips, similar to the better-known Boeing B-47. The landing gear configuration was tested on a modified VEB 14.

On 4 December 1958, the maiden flight of the first prototype V1/I (DM-ZYA) took place, which lasted for 35 minutes. During its second flight, the aircraft was lost in a crash at Ottendorf-Okrilla on 4 March 1959, killing the entire crew. It is believed that the pilots, lacking experience operating jet-propelled aircraft, may have been unfamiliar with the slow response time of such engines, contributing to a stall and subsequent crash. The reasons for the crash were never fully investigated and the results of the limited investigation were only made public in 1990. The loss has been attributed as having been a major setback to the programme and later having played a factor in its termination.

Following the accident, test flights continued using the second prototype V4/II (DM-ZYB), although this aircraft did not fly until 1960. It would be the first to be powered by the indigenously-developed Pirna 014 turbojet engine. Other changes made on the second prototype included a different landing gear configuration, involving an unusual configuration of the main landing gear that shared the same pylon as the engines, as well as the glazed nose for the navigator being dispensed with. The third prototype, V5/II (DM-ZYC), was never flown, it was only used for ground-based testing.

The flight test programme was abruptly terminated after conducting only three flights; reportedly, a serious malfunction involving the fuel tanks, which interrupted fuel supply during a steep descent, was discovered. The question of whether this design flaw had contributed to the crash of the first prototype remains unanswered. There were still about 20 aircraft in production for the East German state airline Deutsche Lufthansa until mid-1961. On 28 February 1961, the East German government issued an order for the dissolution of its national aeronautical industry; this decision was reportedly heavily influenced by the Soviet Union, which was then promoting its own similar-sized airliner, the Tupolev Tu-124; despite earlier promises, it no longer wanted to purchase any Baade 152s or provide further development support. Similar curtailing of autonomous aviation-related programmes was carried out throughout the Eastern Bloc during this period.

All examples of the aircraft were scrapped. In 1995 a restoration effort involving the abandoned 152/II #011 fuselage was initiated at EADS EFW (Elbe Flugzeugwerke GmbH) in Dresden, which is the direct successor of VEB Flugzeugwerke Dresden. Another consequence of the project's cancellation was that engine manufacturer Industriewerke Ludwigsfelde (IWL) was left with 30 completed Pirna 014 power plants with no customers for them. These surplus engines were later used to power a number of minesweepers operated by the Volksmarine.

=== Chronology ===
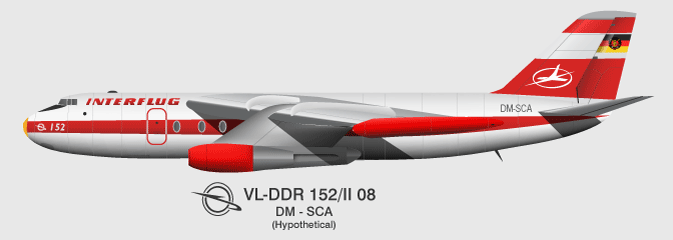
Sketch of the 152 as it would have appeared in service with Interflug

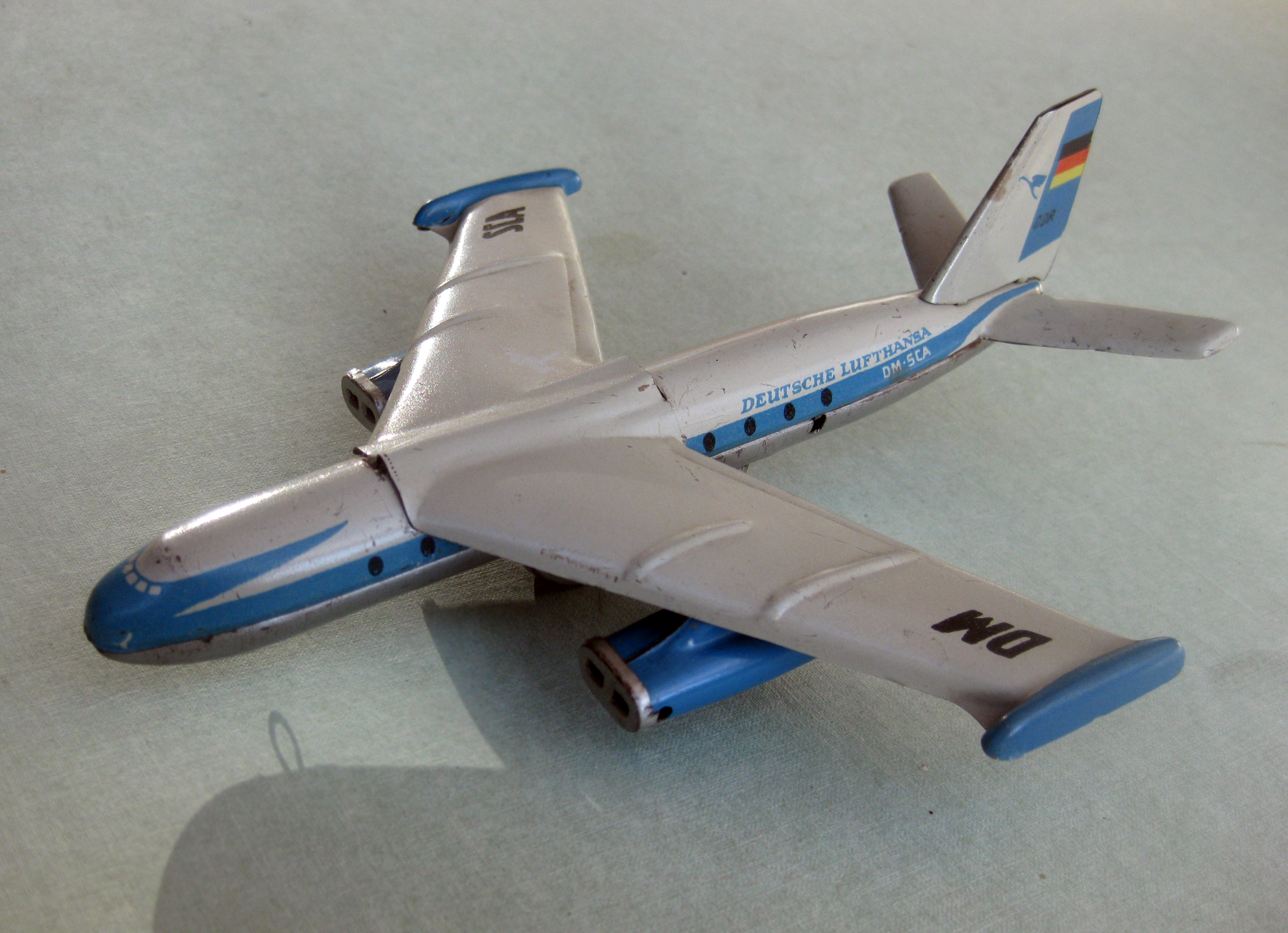
Toy of the 152 in the livery of the East German Deutsche Lufthansa

- 12 October 1956 – First test run of jet engine Pirna 014.
- March 1958 – First presentation of airplane 152 and jet engine Pirna 014 at the Leipzig Spring Fair.
- 30 April 1958 – Roll out of first 152/I V1 prototype plane without engines.
- 4 December 1958 – First flight of prototype 152/I V1 for 35 minutes with jet engines Tumansky RD-9.
- 4 March 1959 – Second flight of prototype 152/I V1 for 55 minutes. Plane crashed after rapid descent killing the crew of four.
- 9 September 1959 – Testing of Pirna 014 jet engines on test plane Ilyushin Il-28R.
- 30 July 1960 – Start of ground testing for 152/II V4 plane.
- 26 August 1960 – First flight of prototype 152/II V4 for 22 minutes with Pirna 014.
- 4 September 1960 – Second flight of prototype 152/II V4 for 20 minutes.
- 7 September 1960 – Roll out of the third prototype 152/II V5.
- 7 September 1960 – Serious fuel system malfunctions during ground tests resulting in grounding both the 152/IIs.
- December 1960 – End of ground testing of prototype 152/II V4.
- March 1961 – End of Pirna 014 jet engine production.
- 20 June 1961 – Last flight of Pirna 014 jet engine on test plane IL-28R.
- Mid-1961 – Scrapping of all produced 152 planes.

== Specifications (152/II V4) ==
Data from 152 Homepage

General characteristics

- Crew: 6
- Capacity: 48/57/72 (depending on configuration)
- Length: 31.4 m (103 ft 0 in)
- Wingspan: 26.3 m (86 ft 3 in)
- Height: 9 m (29 ft 6 in)
- Wing area: 136 m^{2} (1,460 sq ft)
- Airfoil: root: TsAGI S-10s-9; tip: TsAGI SR-3-12
- Empty weight: 28,580 kg (63,008 lb)
- Max takeoff weight: 46,500 kg (102,515 lb)
- Powerplant: 4 × Pirna 014 turbojet engines, 30.9 kN (6,900 lbf) thrust each

Performance

- Maximum speed: 920 km/h (570 mph, 500 kn)
- Cruise speed: 800 km/h (500 mph, 430 kn)
- Range: 2,000–2,500 km (1,200–1,600 mi, 1,100–1,300 nmi) (depending on configuration)

== See also ==
Related development

- Ju 287
- OKB-1 140

Aircraft of comparable role, configuration, and era

- Avro Canada C102 Jetliner
- Tupolev Tu-124

Related lists

- List of jet airliners
