= Ural-Siberian method =

Policy to seize grain in the Soviet Union in the 1930s

The Ural-Siberian method was an extraordinary approach launched in the Soviet Union for the collection of grain from the countryside. It was introduced in the Urals and Siberia, hence the name. The Ural-Siberian method was a return to the drastic policies that had characterized War Communism in the period prior to Lenin’s New Economic Policy.

Criticized by the Right Opposition for being a restoration of extraordinary measures, it was nevertheless approved and eventually received legislative support in June 1929.

== History ==
Between 1928 and 1929, various suggestions were put forth to increase the efficiency of grain procurement.

The initial version of the Ural-Siberian method was first suggested by Ural obkom of the Communist Party of the Soviet Union (CPSU), based on the actual practice used there in 1928. The Bolshevik Politburo approved the suggestion on March 20, 1929 and recommended its use in eastern regions of the Soviet Union. Siberian raikom significantly contributed to this approach (particularly, it suggested pyatikratka, see below), and therefore at the April 1928 Plenum of Central Committee and Central Control Committee of the CPSU, Joseph Stalin dubbed this method "Ural-Siberian".

The approach resembled that of the Kombeds (Poor Peasants Committees) of 1918 to 1919. The village assemblies endorsed the grain procurement plans for their villages and set up the commissions which assigned individual quotas according to the "class approach": it was supposed that kulaks (rich peasants) would be forced to deliver their surplus grain. Kulaks who failed to meet their quotas were fined the amount up to five times the quota, the fine colloquially known as pyatikratka ("five-timer"). Further refusal resulted in up to one year of forced labor camps, and in the case of group resistance, up to two years of confinement with confiscation of property and subsequent internal exile. This practice anticipated the policy of "dekulakization".

== Outcomes ==
The Ural-Siberian Method fostered increasing unrest among peasants, with a corresponding intensification of repressive measures, both in the countryside against peasants, and in cities against private grain traders declared profiteers. 1929 witnessed a significant increase of "mass disturbances" and "kulak terror". In November 1929 OGPU reported 12,808 arrests on counter-revolutionary charges and 15,536 arrests on economic charges, with the bulk of arrests in major grain production regions: Siberia, Northern Caucasus, Ukraine, Central Black Earth Region, and the Urals.

These drastic measures allowed Stalin to speak of "satisfactory procurement", with the backdrop of the 1927 crisis which resulted from the Scissors Crisis of the mid 1920s. Some researchers believe that this relative success convinced Stalin of the efficiency of a forced administrative approach to the peasantry, further developed in the policy of total collectivization in the USSR. This policy was declared an immediate priority at the November 1929 Plenum of the Central Committee of the Russian Communist Party.

== Historiography ==
In Soviet historiography, it was claimed that the method was introduced upon the initiative of a Zavyalovo village in Novosibirsk okrug, and the term Zavyalovo Method was in use for some time. On March 22, 1929 the newspaper Soviet Siberia informed about the "Zavyalovo initiative" and called for spreading it to other places. It is suggested that this publication was propaganda cover-up of the March 20 decision of Politburo.

In western historiography, different versions of the chronology of events have been published due to a lack of documentary sources. In particular, some works say that the method was first introduced in Siberia, and only later in the Urals. Additional information became available after the dissolution of the Soviet Union, which provided greater clarity regarding adoption of the Ural-Siberian method.

== See also ==
- Soviet grain procurement crisis of 1928
