= OKB-1 150 =

Type of aircraft

OKB-1 '150'
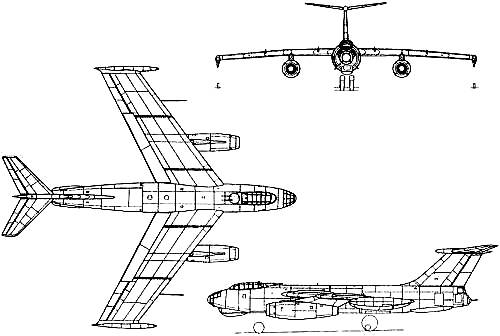

General information
- Type: Jet bomber
- National origin: Soviet Union
- Manufacturer: GOZ-1
- Number built: 1 (+ 1 test article)

History
- First flight: 5 September 1952
- Developed into: Baade 152

The OKB-1 150 was a jet bomber designed and produced in the Soviet Union from 1948.

== Development ==
At the end of World War II, many German engineers were 'seconded' by the Soviet government to continue their advanced research under direct supervision of the USSR. One of the most significant German teams was OKB-1 (opytno-konstruktorskoye byuro – experimental design bureau) set up in GOZ-1 (Gosudarstvenny opytnyy zavod – state experimental plant) at Dubna near Moscow. OKB-1, with Dr. Brunolf Baade as chief designer, continued work on German-built aircraft such as the EF-131 and '140', which used many components of the two EF-131's, as well as design work on the stillborn EF 132 long-range bomber. By early 1948 Semyon Alekseyev had been appointed supervisor/chief warden/supervisor of OKB-1, with Dr. Brunolf Baade remaining as chief designer. This has caused confusion in the past with '150' being ascribed to Alekseyev and not OKB-1 (OKB-1 was not named after Baade for propaganda reasons).

In 1948 OKB-1 started design work on a new jet bomber, designated RB-2 (Reaktiivnyy Bombardirovshchik – jet bomber), to a specification drawn up by ADD (Aviahtsiya Dahl'nevo Deystviya - long range aviation). This design evolved until the use of a new designation seemed prudent and thus '150' was born. (Note:- many aviation writers use Samolyet/aircraft or Izdeliye/product descriptors when the aircraft was simply called '150', the same applies to '140' and its variants.). The '150' was originally to be powered by two Lyul'ka TR-3 turbojet engines, but on 20 May 1949 OKB-1 was ordered to use Mikulin AMRD-04 engines, this decision was eventually overturned and the smaller, lighter and less powerful Lyul'ka TR-3A was finally selected.

The '150' was constructed throughout with light alloy stressed skin and high-strength steel for highly stressed parts. The fuselage was of oval section fore and aft with a cylindrical section in the middle. The 35° shoulder-mounted swept wings had 1 ^{o} 20' anhedral on the lower surface, outboard of rib 4. The outrigger undercarriages were mounted in large pods at the wingtips which also served as endplates and anti-flutter balance weights. The upper surface of the wings had two wing fences on each side. The 45° swept fin and 40° swept tailplane were constructed in a similar fashion to the wings, the tailplane attached to the extremity of the fin with eight degrees of dihedral to improve longitudinal stability, and a large carrot-like fairing at the fin/tailplane junction.

The main and nose undercarriages retracted aft into the fuselage, with the main undercarriage able to kneel for takeoff making takeoff possible on shorter runways. The twin-wheeled nose and main gears had levered suspension and different tracks to improve rough-field performance. The kneeling undercarriage was initiated at the start of the takeoff run and gradually bled oil out of the Oleo-pneumatic strut until the required incidence of three degrees was reached just before liftoff. After takeoff the undercarriage was selected to retract which reversed the oil flow as the undercarriage retracted. All undercarriages were enclosed with fairings and doors when retracted. The bicycle undercarriage arrangement was tested on the Alekseyev I-215D.

The seven-stage axial compressor Lyul'ka TR-3A (later AL-5) turbojet engines, with variable exhaust nozzles and petrol engine starters, were housed in the streamlined nacelles attached to pylons at 26% span. To boost takeoff performance, four '126-1' JATO rockets of 2,000 kg (4,410 lb)for 17s could be attached to the rear fuselage ('129-1' JATO bottles were used on the prototype).

The control system of the '150' was revolutionary for its time, with irreversible, electrically signalled and electrically driven screwjacks operating the control surfaces. This was one of the first "fly by wire" aircraft as well as one of the first all-powered flying control aircraft, albeit without the benefit of modern computers. Doubts about the control system were allayed at an early stage by extensive testing and demonstrations with an 'iron bird' test rig which duplicated the system installed in the aircraft, and a captured Ju 388L, designated '145', which was modified with the electrical control system. The electrical power source for the flying controls also raised doubts about the ability of the electrical system to cope, especially with an engine failure. To provide electrical power in the event of generator or engine failure a drop-down RAT(ram air turbine), driven by ram air in the aircraft slipstream provided a backup system.

The defensive armament was carried in remotely controlled dorsal and tail barbettes, with the dorsal gunner sitting at the rear of the large cockpit facing rearwards and the tail gunner in the tail operating the tail barbette. The pilot controlled a single forward-firing fixed cannon in the starboard forward fuselage.

Up to 6,000 kg (13,320 lb) of bombs were to be carried internally in the fuselage bomb bay between the nose and main undercarriages.

The forward fuselage pressure cabin housed the pilot. The co-pilot/radio-operator and dorsal gunner were accommodated under a large greenhouse-style canopy, the navigator in the extreme nose, and the tail-gunner in his own pressure cabin sitting on a downward-firing ejection seat. The forward compartment crew members were intended to have ejection seats but photographic evidence in the reference given does not show this.

'150' was provided with the latest radios, radars and navigation aids, with a ground mapping bombsight radar in a chin fairing under the nose, which also housed the taxi and landing lamps.

Despite the high priority given to the aircraft itself, progress was slow during the design and construction phases due largely to the low priority allocated to the foreign OKB for resources. Baade remained in constant contact with the authorities to defend the slow progress while stopping short of blaming the paranoid administrative system. Along with the bureaucratic setbacks, the aircraft suffered a steady stream of system and structural failures that had to be addressed before it could fly. On top of these difficulties, the OKB was forced to halt work completely in June and July 1949 while the conversion of the 140 into the 140-R received top priority, which in hindsight proved to be a waste of resources.

Flight trials finally began in September 1952. but progressed slowly due to the weather and rectifying the defects discovered during the trials. The seventeenth flight on 9 May 1953 proved to be the last, when the pilot Yakov Vernikov misjudged the flare on landing, the aircraft ballooned and stalled into the runway from approx 10m. Extensive but repairable damage was caused, but the '150' was never repaired, with test rigs, airframe components, and other parts dispersed to other OKB's. OKB-1 was disbanded and the German engineers were repatriated to the GDR.

== Variants ==
- '150' – The initial version of the aircraft, flown as the '150'
- '150-R' – A tactical photo reconnaissance aircraft variant designed early in 1951, a mockup was built but full-scale development not carried out.
- '152' - The Baade 152 (a.k.a. VEB type 152) airliner designed and manufactured in the DDR by VEB Flugzeugwerke Dresden after the OKB-1 team were repatriated.

== Specifications ('150') ==
Data from Gordon, Yefim. "Early Soviet Jet Bombers". Hinkley, Midland. 2004. ISBN 1-85780-181-4

General characteristics

- Crew: five
- Length: 26.74 m (87 ft 8.75 in)
- Wingspan: 24.1 m (79 ft 1 in)
- Height: 7.6 m (24 ft 11.25 in)
- Wing area: 158 m^{2} (1,700 sq ft)
- Empty weight: 26,100 kg (57,550 lb)
- Gross weight: 47,000 kg (103,635 lb)
- Powerplant: 2 × Lyul'ka TR-3A , 49.05 kN (11,025 lbf) thrust each

Performance

- Maximum speed: 970 km/h (603 mph, 524 kn)
- Range: 4,500 km (2,800 mi, 2,400 nmi)
- Endurance: 5 hours 36 minutes
- Service ceiling: 12,500 m (41,000 ft)
- Rate of climb: 16.66 m/s (3,281 ft/min)

Armament

- 1 x Sh-23 (Shpital'nyy – Boris Shpital'nyy 23mm cannon) fixed, forward firing in starboard forward fuselage.
- 2 x Sh-23 23mm cannon in a DB-23 remote-controlled dorsal barbette.
- 2 x Sh-23 23mm cannon in a DB-25 remote-controlled tail barbette.
- 6,000 kg (13,230 lb) of bombs in an internal bomb bay.

== See also ==
Related development

- Baade 152

Aircraft of comparable role, configuration, and era

- North American B-45 Tornado
- Martin XB-51
- Ilyushin Il-46
- Ilyushin Il-54

Related lists

- List of aircraft
