= Pirna 014 =

1950s East German turbojet aircraft engine

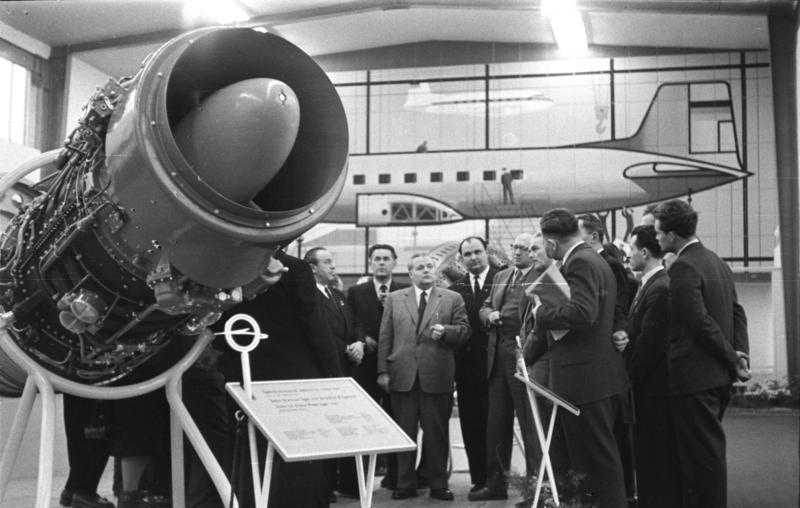
- Pirna 014 jet engine at the Spring Leipzig Trade Fair in March 1958.
- Type: turbojet
- National origin: East Germany
- Manufacturer: Industriewerke Ludwigsfelde
- First run: 12 October 1956
- Major applications: Baade 152
- Developed from: Jumo 012

The Pirna 014 was an axial turbojet designed in East Germany (or the GDR) in the mid- to late 1950s by former Junkers engineers, who were repatriated to East Germany in 1954 after being held in custody in the Soviet Union following World War II.

== Origin ==
After the remaining groups of German aircraft technology engineers, those which were not yet about to be repatriated back home, had been concentrated in Sawjelowo north of Moscow in December 1953, development planning for a four jet engine-powered civilian airliner started. The role of head of engine research & development was assigned to (then Dipl.-Ing.) Ferdinand Brandner, whereas (then Dipl.-Ing.) Brunolf Baade was given the general project lead.

Before Brandner finally went back to his family in Austria, after being forced to stay in the Soviet Union for 9 years, he selected his deputy (then Dr.-Ing.) Rudolf Scheinost to continue his work and to lead development of the engine. The engine project 014, a continuation of the numbering sequence of previous Jumo jet engines, was at this time named Dwigatel 014 (from reactivnyi dvigatel, literally "jet engine") and given high priority.

As for the airliner that was intended being powered by project 014, it was the Baade 152 passenger jet, which was to be developed and constructed as pre-production aircraft at VEB Industriewerke Dresden (Factory 803), part of which was the later VEB Flugzeugwerke Dresden.

On 5 July 1954 the last group of 200, mainly engineers but finally also the key technical leads and minds, arrived in the Saxon town of Pirna. While only some persons, for example Ferdinand Brandner or Günther Bock left again shortly afterwards for their final destinations in Austria and West Berlin, the majority were eager to continue with engine and aircraft development in the GDR. In a part of the town called Sonnenstein (literally sun stone, which itself is situated on a plateau between the river valleys of Elbe in the North and Gottleuba in the West), work centered around planning of future operations / building factories and related to 152 and 014 started almost instantly.

First they operated from the buildings of HV-18 (Hauptverwaltung 18, which was established earlier, in 1951–1952), until construction work for the engine development works started in the summer of 1955. A new design and administration building, almost identical to the one in Dresden located at Factory 801, was constructed. Two large assembly and manufacturing plants, several engine test stands (with their characteristic towers), large underground tanks intended for test runs, other halls and social facilities, plus housing for the workers were finished.

VEB Entwicklungsbau Pirna (Factory 802) (renamed VEB Gasturbinenbau und Energiemaschinenentwicklung Pirna in 1961, later in 1970 transformed into VEB Strömungsmaschinen Pirna) was officially founded there on 1 May 1955. (Other development works and factories that later formed the East German aviation industry were founded on the same date. See History of East German aviation industry.) The project documentation that was already begun before final return of the engineers involved to Germany, was extended by a new, enlarged team now being located in Pirna and prepared for prototyping.

From the beginnings in 1954 until the completion of new factories in 1957, the premises in Pirna were basically operating as the spiritual center of aviation-related research, development & production in the GDR. Only from thereon, it was that upper management level moved to their new offices in Dresden.

== Design and development ==
=== Design ===
Citations: Mewes 1997, p. 36-39.
It was designed as a single-shaft, single-flow turbojet. The basic conception was a further development of the design already applied with high perfection on Junkers Jumo 004 and Junkers Jumo 012, as well as the BMW 003 and BMW 018 engines. In this design, the compressor, combustion chamber and turbine are traversed in axial direction by the air taken directly from the inlet.

The experiences acquired by technical management in the Soviet Union during further development of mentioned Junkers and BMW engines, as well as entirely new developments like TW-2, NK-2 / NK-4 (Soviet program names of Jumo 022 developments, leading to TV-022 and 2TV-2F engines) along with the high-power turboprop NK-12 were considered during design and construction of components for this new engine project.

This knowledge was now serving as a foundation for the enlarged Pirna team to develop a modern, simple and robust jet engine from the already existing project documentation, which would be suitable for a civilian airliner according to specific needs regarding power requirements, simple handling, reliability, and low maintenance.

Compressor

The twelve-stage axial compressor was coupled directly to the two-stage turbine, just like on the Jumo 012. This resulted in relatively simple bearings construction and advantageous controllability.

The compressor housing was a welded steel sheet construction, divided in two parts. The upper half contained the fuel- and engine control systems, later also the automated starter control and ignition coils for two ignitors located in the combustion chamber's upper area.

Engine control

Engine control was handled by a fully automatic, compact commando unit using a proven Junkers single-handed lever action. In various states of flight, fuel throughput can vary greatly. Therefore, fuel injectors located in the burners were given two stages, resulting in good efficiency over a large operational range.

Combustion chamber

The chamber was a can-annular design. Based on experiences with Junkers' can-type chambers (Jumo 004) and BMW's annular-type chambers (BMW 003), this design choice was successfully applied already during the Soviet period. 12 burner cans and 60 air pockets (integrated into inner and outer wall) were used, along with several more air canals. This construction proved an efficiency of about 98% burn-out grade inside the combustion chamber during bench-tests.

This construction achieved an all-around flow of cooling air of chamber walls, so those were relatively protected of the high temperatures inside the chamber, which reached up to 3200 °C in the flame area. Thus, thermal requirements for chamber wall and air pocket materials were determined to be considerable lower at first. Engine inlet temperature was calculated to be around 780 °C (1050K), as higher-temperature resistant materials were not available at this time.

Turbine

For the two-stage reaction turbine, a low cooling effect for the turbine discs was achieved using a skillful airflow, which was diverted from beneath the combustion chamber and directed inwards toward the shaft. The turbine blades were not cooled, but the guide blades for the first turbine stage were fabricated hollow.

The major part of exhaust gases' thermal gradient was distributed equally on both turbine stages; the remainder converted to a thrust of 3150kp, using a fixed thrust nozzle.

Starter / Generator

The assembly of both components has changed; they were not anymore attached using a separate equipment carrier behind the engine. Integrated into a single component and inserted into the intake bullet, it worked directly on the shaft, where it was coupled with the engine-rotor using a separate transmission assembly for the starter.

Oil tank

Originally to be mounted beneath the engine, it was re-designed as an annular oil tank. The new mounting place was now in the diffuser area, in front of the air-intake casting.

Air-intake casting

This component was made from light metal cast design. Using a separator transmission coupled to the compressor rotor, the upper-mounted equipment carrier for fuel pump & control-pressure transmitter as well as the oil pump block were driven.

Blow-off system

Initially, 4 rectangular blow-off flaps (valves) were installed; later they were changed to 8 round flaps. Further during the re-design process, specifically from prototype engine V-07 onwards, this implementation was changed to a different, better controllable system which involved an annular blow-off belt.

=== Revision A0 ===
Citations: Mewes 1997, p. 39-42.
A mock-up engine designated V-00 was used for testing assembly & positions of components, pipes and fittings. Positions of electrical / pipe connections were also determined & matched after coordinations done with the people responsible for airframe construction in Klotzsche.

In parallel, a first trial engine was constructed at VEB Entwicklungsbau Pirna. This was engine V-01, which only at this time adopted the final program designation "Pirna 014" that was derived from both town name and former designation. It took two years of construction- and assembly time; so in October 1956 a first trial was made possible.

=== Revision A1 ===
Citations: Mewes 1997, p. 47-49.
Introduced changes for revision A-1 were:

- Newly calculated compressor blade profiles
- The already mentioned, annular blow-off belt, which opened and closed continuously
- An additional compressor stage, mounted upstream before the first compressor stage and air-intake casting
- An automatic, revolutions- and acceleration-depended blow-off system control, integrated into the commando unit
- Intake de-icing system (with associated additional, isolated pipeline management and a heat exchanger which was mounted above the turbine)

During compressor trials it was discovered that the compressor's operational range was too narrow for cruising altitudes greater than 5000m. Therefore, the compressor of revision A-0 which was conceived already in the Soviet Union had to be redesigned.

Those changes related to compressor blades and the blow-off system resulted in a quieter, smoother rotor behavior, as well as better pump characteristics. Associated critical revolutions were now in a range better suited for flight, resulting in a broader compressor operational range.

Air consumption was increased by 5,5 kg/s (52.0 kg/s to 57.5 kg/s), resulting in a thrust increase from 30.89 kilonewtons (6,940 lb_{f}) to 32.36 kilonewtons (7,270 lb_{f}).

With this revision, the intake de-icing using an integrated de-icing system was proven in the winter months of 1960. Also, bird strike trials did not disturb engine operation. (See Special trials section.)

== Trials ==
=== Bench trials ===
Engine V-01 was first run on 12 October 1956 on engine test stand 2 in building complex 62 under reduced load for about 2.5h. Pushing the engine under full load was not possible at this time, the reason being the use of non-heat-resistant materials as those were not available domestically.

The original intention was to just perform aerodynamic measurements proving correct engine test stand functionality, as well as to test oil circulation on a completed engine. Yet, the decision was made to let the engine freely run on its own power. After five start attempts, ignition was achieved, the jet carefully reaching 6200rpm. No disruptions were recorded.

First accident happened on 25 February 1958. During V-01 measurement run 50 on engine test stand 1, turbine stage 2 failed, which led to partial destruction of the engine from the combustion chamber onwards. (Mewes 1997, p. 42.)

All prototype engines from V-02 to V-14 were essentially used for experimental and measurements runs. Such trials as well as endurance tests were needed to secure engine airworthiness certification. After five years of research and development, in the second half of 1959 type certification was achieved after engine V-017 successfully completed a 150-hour endurance trial. Thus, an important prerequisite for beginning of flight trials was met.

=== Flight trials ===
The first flight trial was then performed on 11 September 1959, using an Ilyushin Il-28R with the engine mounted on the underside of the fuselage.

Four A-0 engines were used in the second Baade 152 prototype 152/II V4.

== End of Program ==
Because of political decisions, which were associated with Soviet interests, the Baade 152 program and all other aircraft programs in development at VEB Flugzeugwerke Dresden, which at the time was the entire aircraft industry of the GDR, were stopped in 1961. Except for minor remnants, the aircraft industry in the GDR was then dissolved. The Pirna 014 engines that were already series-produced (revisions A0 and A1) at VEB Industriewerke Ludwigsfelde (Factory 807) were put to other uses, including as emergency power generators.

== Applications ==
- Baade 152 – main engines (4x), two in each gondola
- "Hai" class anti-submarine ships – revisions A2 and A3, production engines that were modified for their repurposing as gas generators driving two gas turbines (3677 kW each) to form a gas-turbine propulsion plant. This combination was called Pirna 051/1 and installed on 13 of 14 ships of the class.

== Variants ==
- Pirna 014-A0 – preproduction version, 1957
- Pirna 014-A1 – series production version, 1959
- Pirna 014-A2 – modified from existing production engines for naval gas generator use, 1961
- Pirna 014-A3 – modified from existing production engines for naval gas generator use, 1961
- Pirna 014-A5 – gas generator for use in combination with gas turbine in peak load-gas turbine plant Pirna E-1, 1962
- Pirna 014-C – project, variant of A-0, 1960

== Further developments ==
- Pirna 016 – project, integrated a newly constructed compressor, was intended to replace the older 014, 1958
- Pirna 018 – project, turboprop test engine for compressor trials
- Pirna 020 – project, twin-flow turbojet test engine for compressor trials

=== Variants table ===
Designation	Type	Layout	Compression	Specific fuel consumption	Air consumption	Turbine inlet temperature	Thrust or power	Dry weight	Speed
Pirna 014-A0	Turbojet	12V2T	7:1	0.85 kg/km/h	52.0 kg/s	1050K	3,150 kiloponds (30,900 N; 6,900 lb_{f})	1,060 kg (2,340 lb)	8000rpm
Pirna 014-A1	Turbojet	12V2T+	7:1	0.86 kg/km/h	57.5 kg/s	1070K	3,300 kiloponds (32,000 N; 7,300 lb_{f})	1,050 kg (2,310 lb)	8200rpm
Pirna 014-C	Turbojet	12V2T+	7:1	0.859 kg/km/h	57.5 kg/s	1070K	3,300 kiloponds (32,000 N; 7,300 lb_{f})	1,065 kg (2,348 lb)	8200rpm
Pirna 016 (projected)	Turbojet	12V3T	11.9:1	0.72 kg/km/h	60.4 kg/s	1035K	3,500 kiloponds (34,000 N; 7,700 lb_{f})	1,050 kg (2,310 lb)	8700rpm

Layout: V=axial flow compressor stages, T=turbine stages. (+ indicates additional stage)

== Specifications (Pirna 014-A0) ==
Data from Mewes, Pirna 014. Flugtriebwerke der DDR.

==== General characteristics ====
- Type: turbojet
- Length: 3,446 mm (135.7 in)
- Diameter: 981 mm (38.6 in)
- Dry weight: 1,060 kg (2,340 lb)

==== Components ====
- Compressor: twelve stage axial flow
- Combustors: cannular combustion chamber, 12 cans
- Turbine: two stage
- Fuel type: kerosene / jet fuel (specification T-1)

==== Performance ====
- Maximum thrust: 3,150 kiloponds (30,900 N; 6,900 lb_{f}) at 8000rpm, non-afterburning
- Overall pressure ratio: 7:1
- Air mass flow: 52.0k g/s
- Turbine inlet temperature: 1050 K
- Specific fuel consumption: 0.85 kg/km/h
- Thrust-to-weight ratio: 2.97

== List of engines produced ==
=== Prototypes table (Factory 802) ===
Pirna 014

Designation	Variant	Usage
V-00	0	---
V-01	A	---
V-02	A0	---
V-03	A0	---
V-04	A0	---
V-05	A0	---
V-06	A0	---
V-07	A0	---
V-08	A0	---
V-09	A0	---
V-10	A0	---
V-11	A0	---
V-12	A0	---
V-13	A0	---
V-14	A0	---
V-15	A0	---
V-16	A0	---
V-17	A0	---
V-18	A0	---
V-19	A0	---
V-20	A1	---
V-21	A0	---
V-22	A1	---
V-23	A0	---
V-24	A0	---
V-25	A1	---
V-26	A1	---
V-27	A1	---
V-28	A1	---
V-29	A1	---
V-30	A1	---
V-31	A1	---
V-32	A1	---
V-33	A1	---
V-34	A1	---
V-35	A1	---

Pirna 014-C

Designation	Variant	Usage
V-00	C	---
V-01	C	---
V-02	C	---

Pirna 016

Designation	Variant	Usage
V-01	-	---

Pirna 018

Designation	Variant	Usage
V-00	-	---
V-01	A	---
V-02	A	---
V-03	A	---

Pirna 020

Designation	Variant	Usage
V-01	A	---

=== Series production table (Factory 807) ===
Designation	Variant	Usage
L-1	0	---
L-2	0	---
L-3	0	---
L-4	0	---
L-5	0	---
000	A0	---
001	A0	---
002	A0	---
003	A0	---
004	A0	---
005	A0	---
006	A0	---
007	A0	---
008	A0	---
009	A0	---
010	A0	---
011	A0	---
012	A0	---
013	A0	---
014	A0	---
015	A0	---
016	A0	---
017	A0	---
018	A0	---
001	A1	---
002	A1	---
003	A1	---
004	A1	---
005	A1	---
006	A1	---
007	A1	---
008	A1	---

== Survivors ==
Survivors known to exist:

- A turbojet Pirna 014 A2 (the former A0/V-16), converted to a gas generator for gas turbine plant Pirna 051/1, is on display (as a cutaway) in the aircraft section of the Dresden Transport Museum.
- At the Deutsches Museum in Munich, Pirna 014 A0/V-05 is displayed in the aircraft section (also in cutaway form). It was transferred from its former location at the Dresden University of Technology, where it was used as a teaching object.
- One revision A1 jet is on display at Industrial Museum Chemnitz. This particular example was used on a speedboat after 1961, how modifications done to the hydraulics in the middle part clearly show. In addition, the exhaust nozzle at the rear end is therefore missing.
- According to Mewes, a Pirna 014 A5 gas generator was placed together with a small gas turbine Pirna 029 in the canteen on the premises of Strömungsmaschinenbau Pirna GmbH. The company, which was the successor of VEB Strömungsmaschinen Pirna after privatization in 1990, entered insolvency already in 1995 and went finally into bankruptcy two years later. The building was sold to a private investor in 2011. The current location of the engine was not yet determined.
- Another cutaway model may still be in ownership of the Dresden University of Technology, on the premises of the Faculty of Transportation Science which is located in the Gerhart Potthoff building.
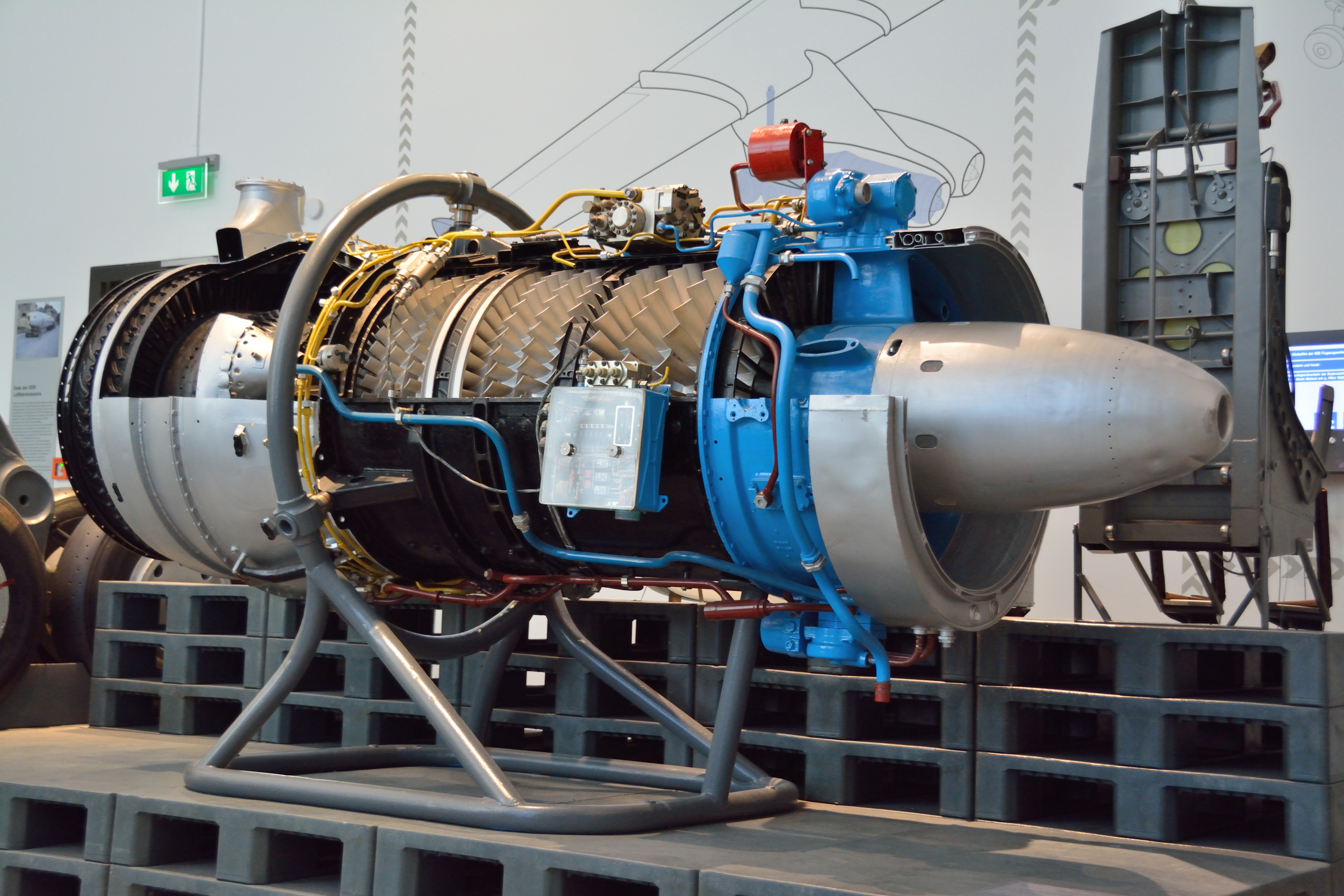
Pirna 014 A0/V-16 at Dresden Transport Museum

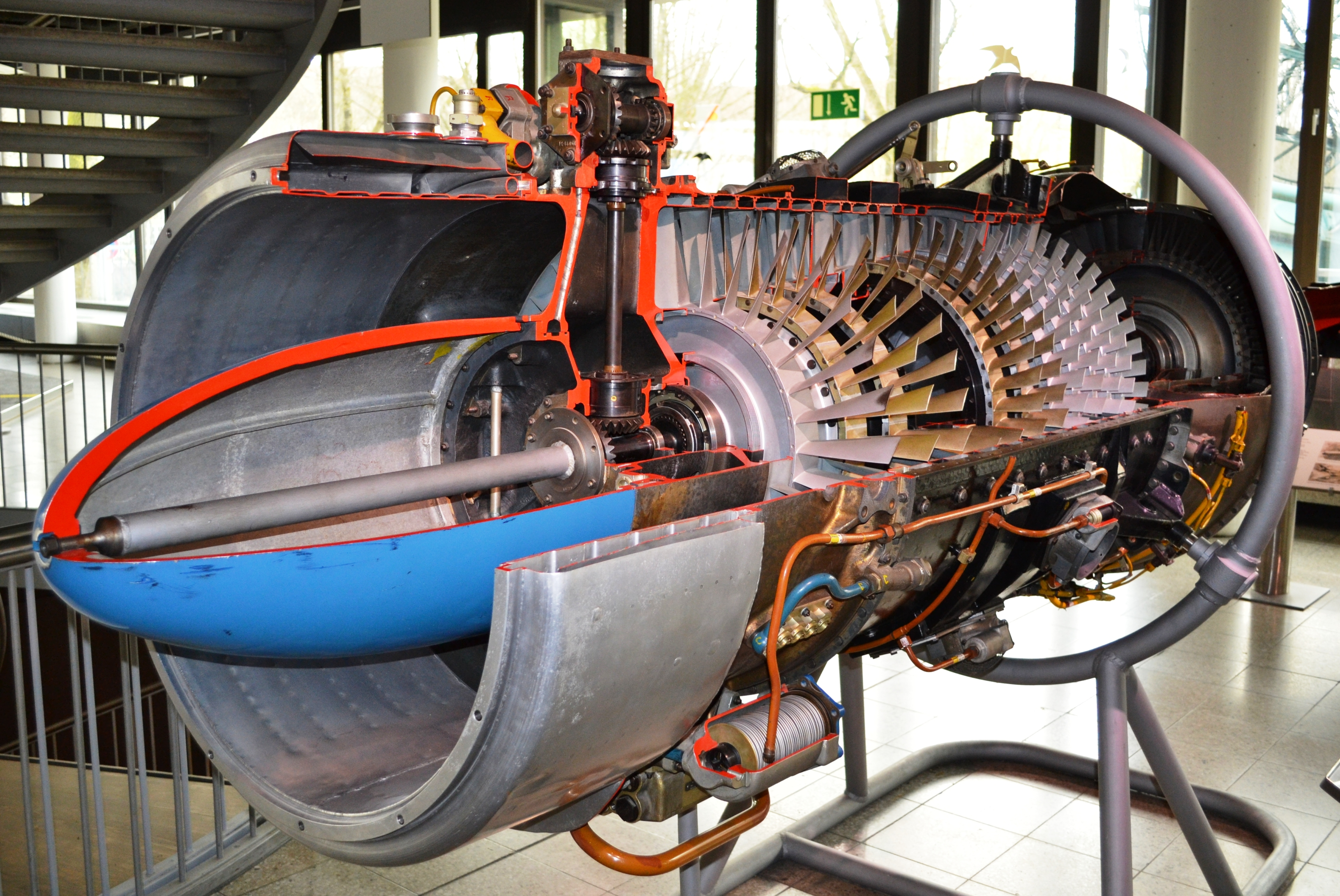
Pirna 014 A0/V-05 at Deutsches Museum Munich

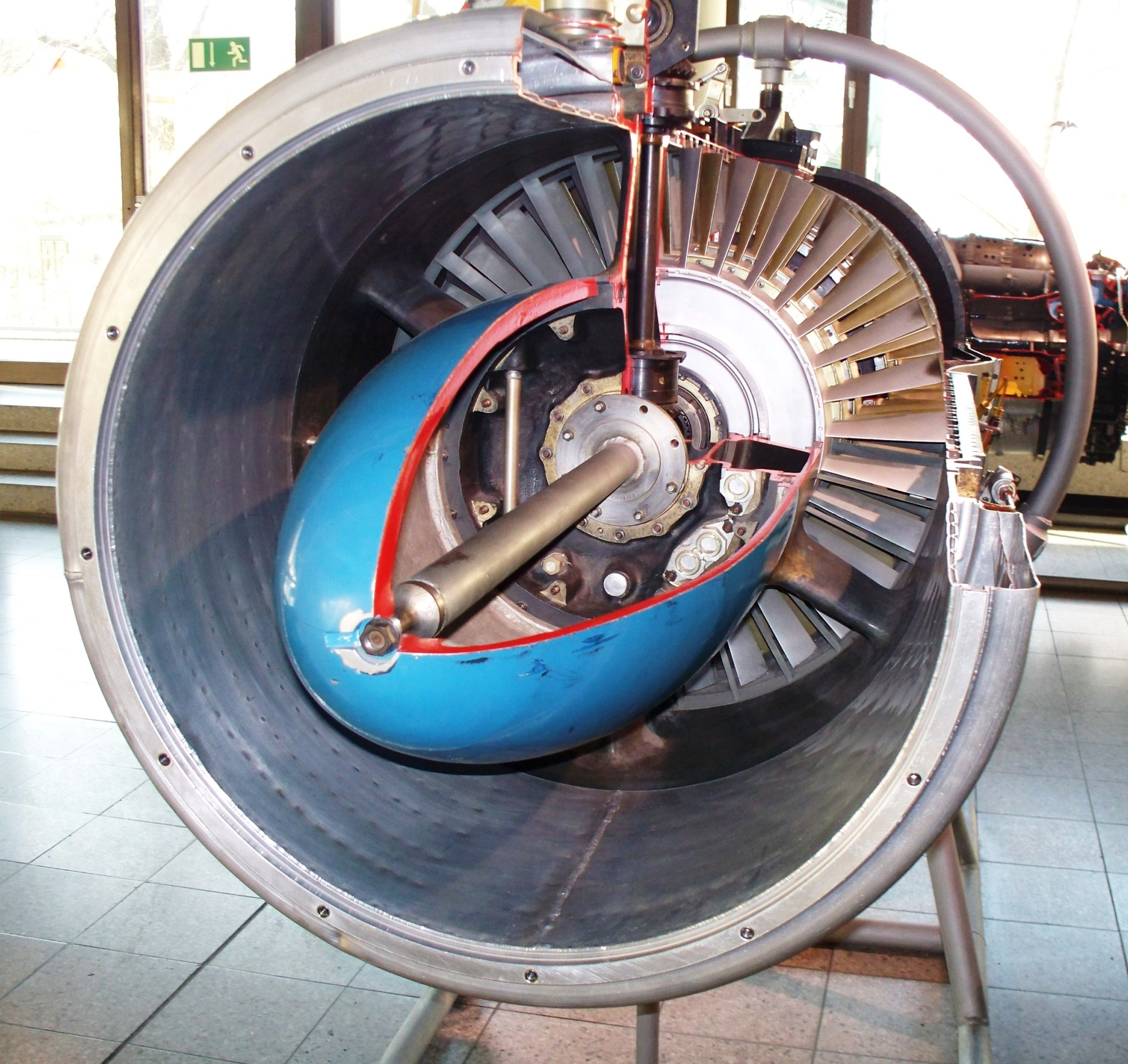
Pirna 014 A0/V-05 at Deutsches Museum Munich - front view

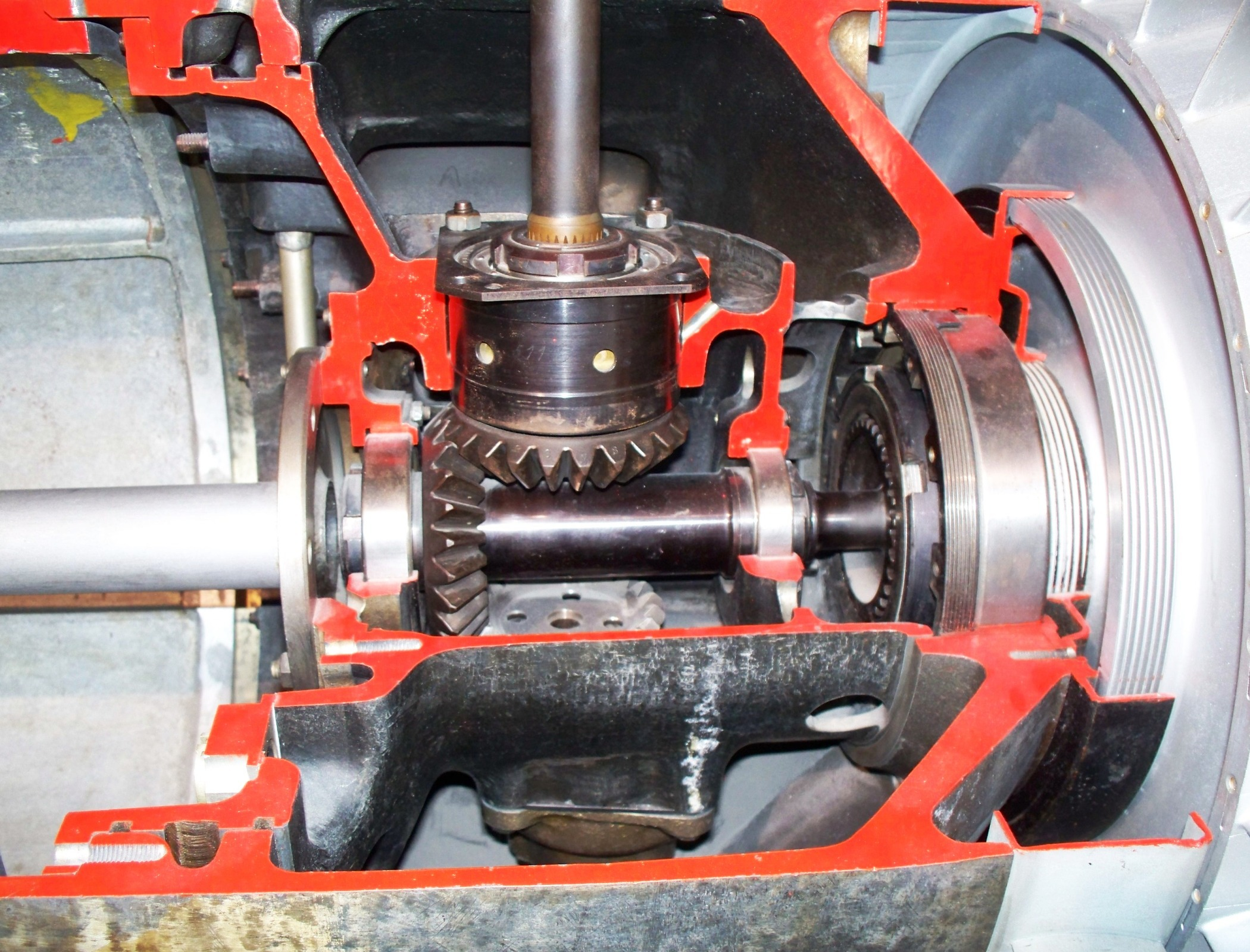
Pirna 014 A0/V-05 at Deutsches Museum Munich - detail view

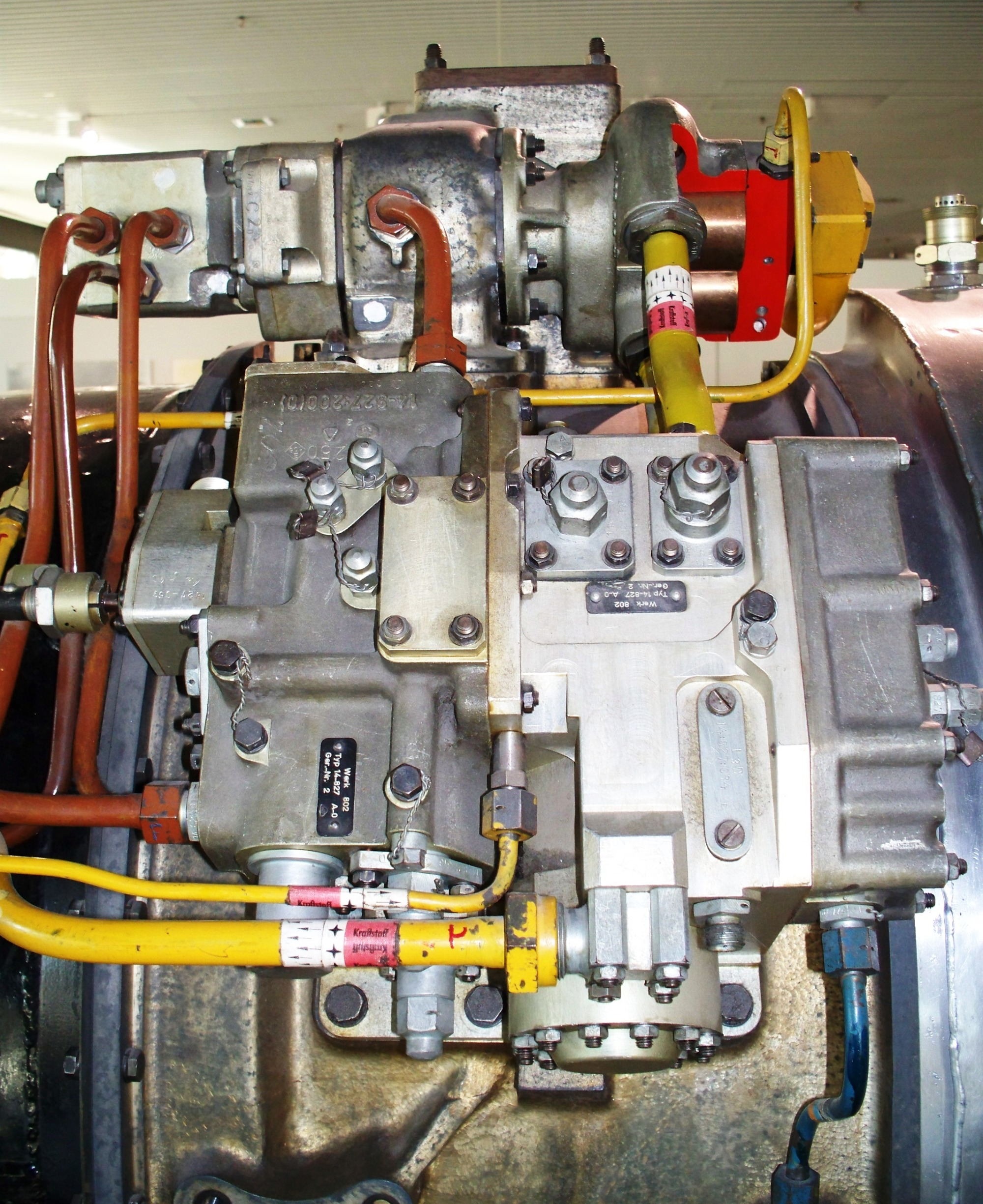
Pirna 014 A0/V-05 at Deutsches Museum Munich - detail view

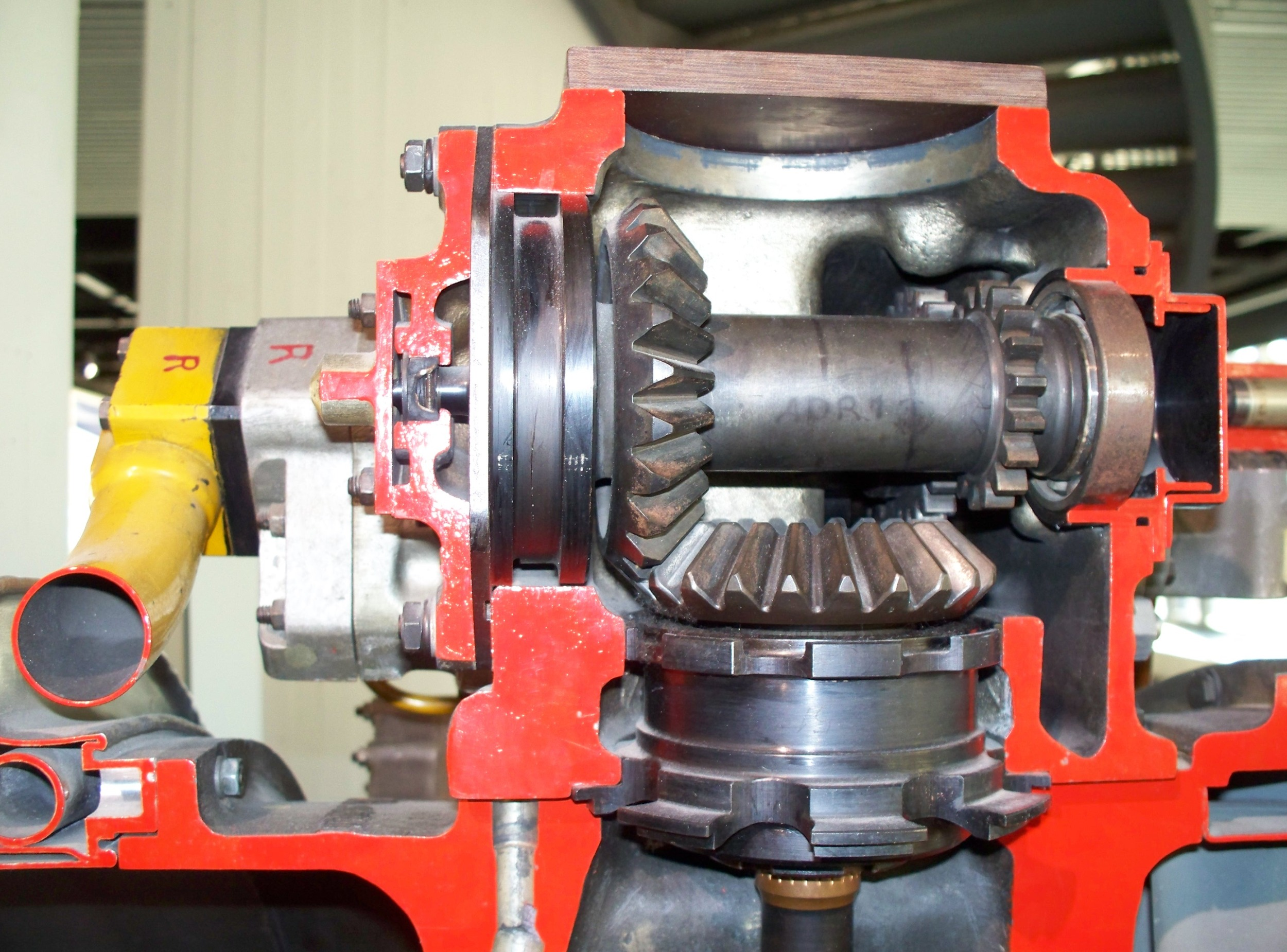
Pirna 014 A0/V-05 at Deutsches Museum Munich - detail view

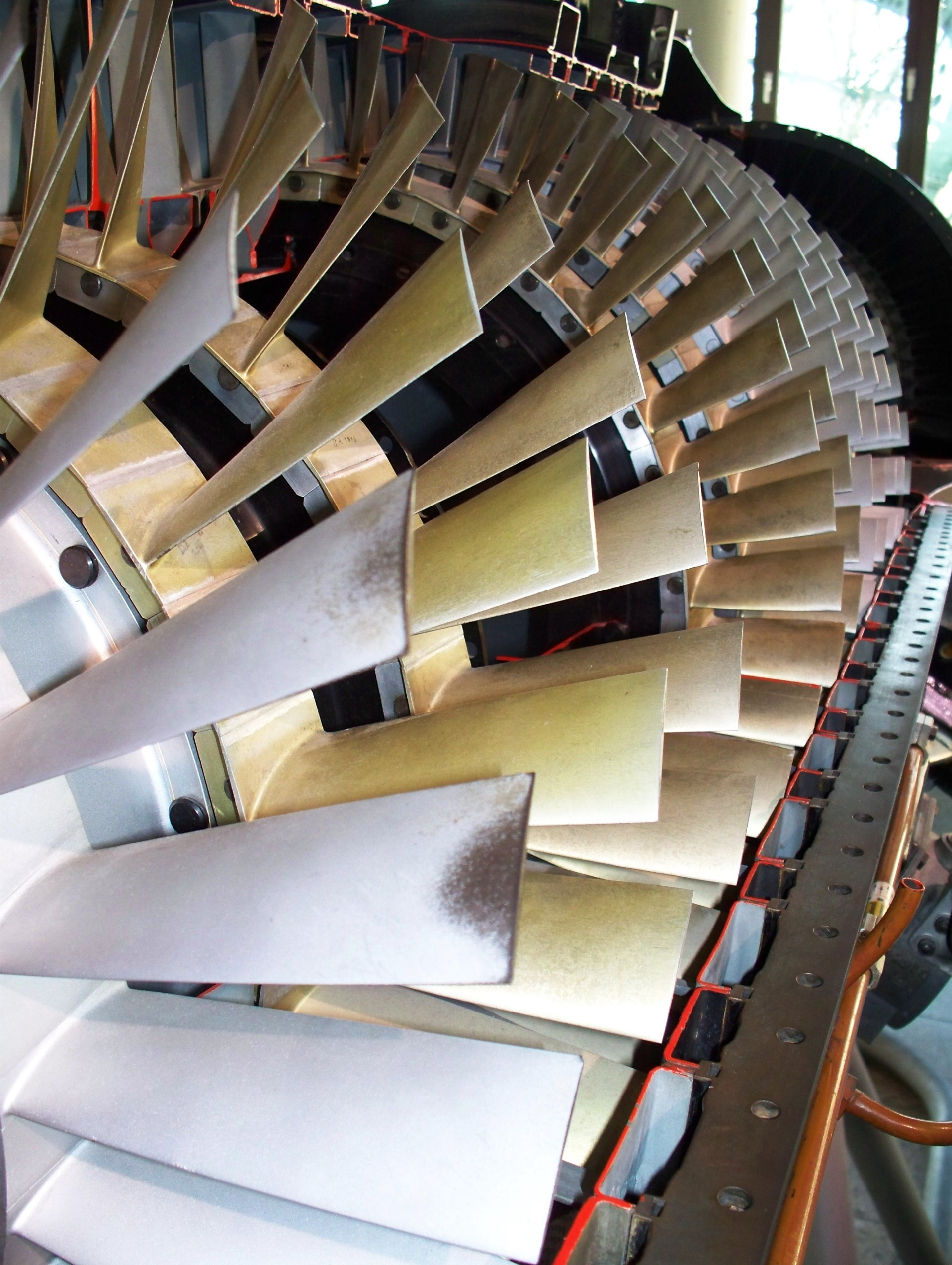
Pirna 014 A0/V-05 at Deutsches Museum Munich - compressor

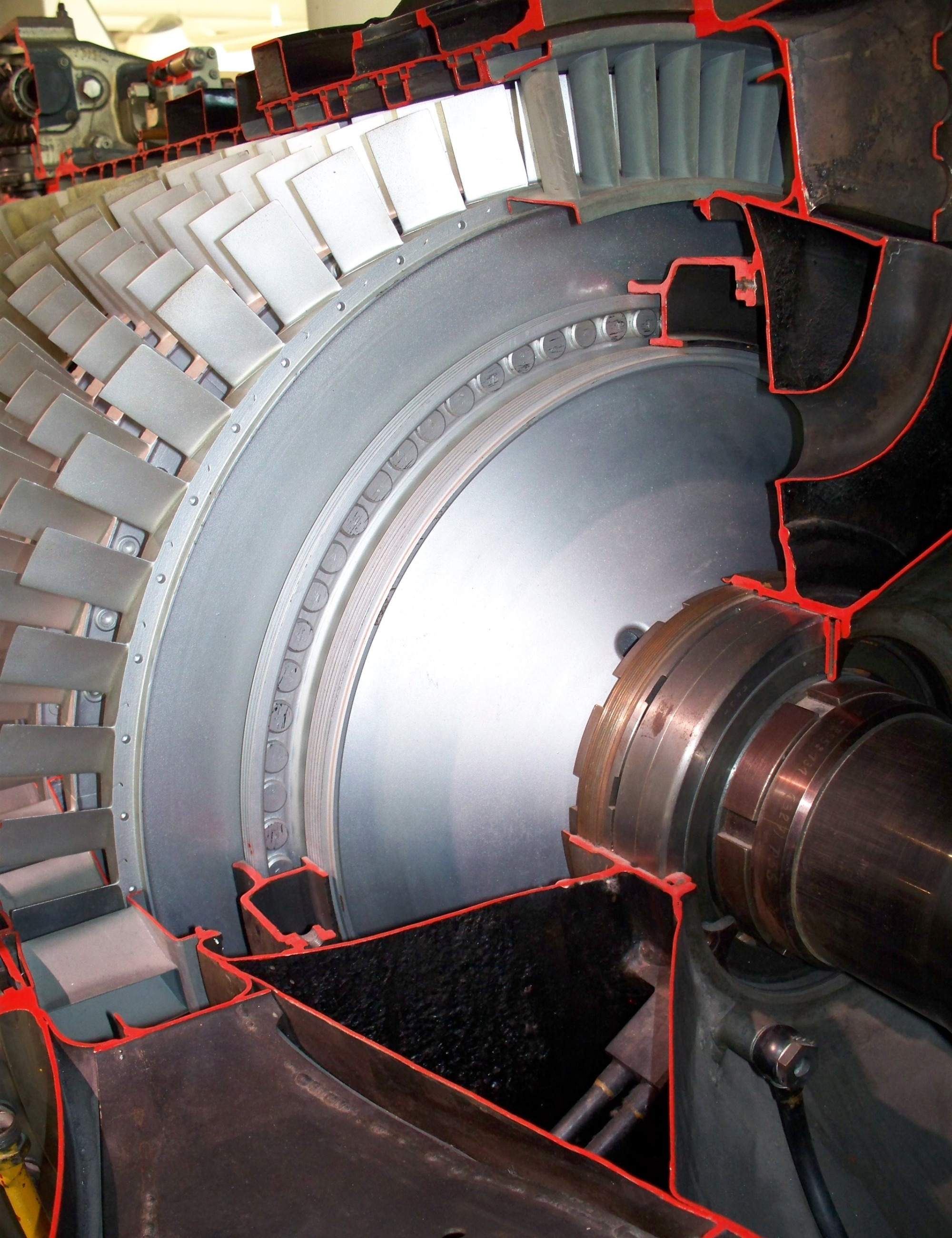
Pirna 014 A0/V-05 at Deutsches Museum Munich - compressor

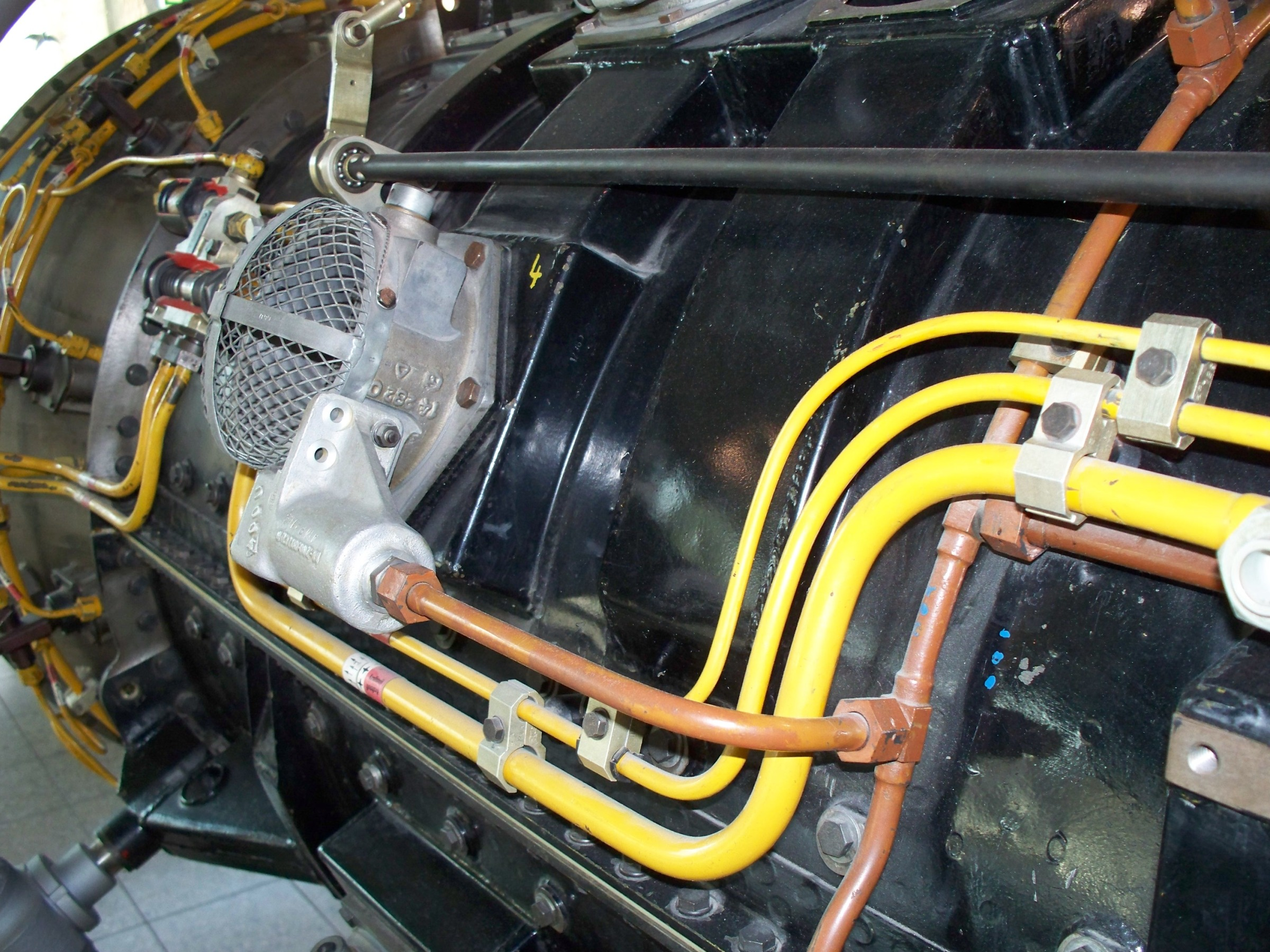
Pirna 014 A0/V-05 at Deutsches Museum Munich - side view

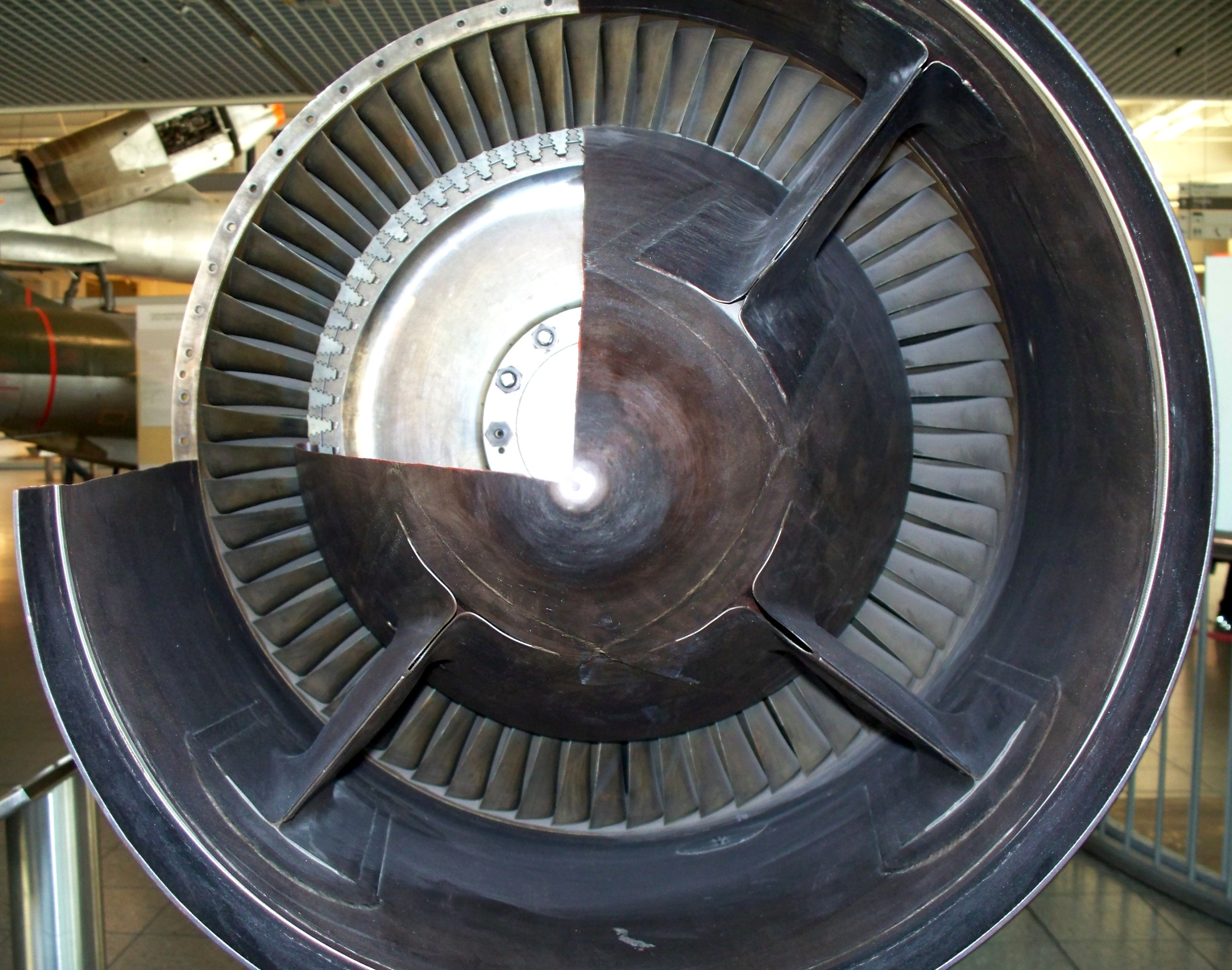
Pirna 014 A0/V-05 at Deutsches Museum Munich - back view

== See also ==
- Ferdinand Brandner

Related development

- Junkers Jumo 012

Comparable engines

- BMW 003
- BMW 018
- Junkers Jumo 004

Related lists

- List of aircraft engines
