= Prodnalog =

Food tax

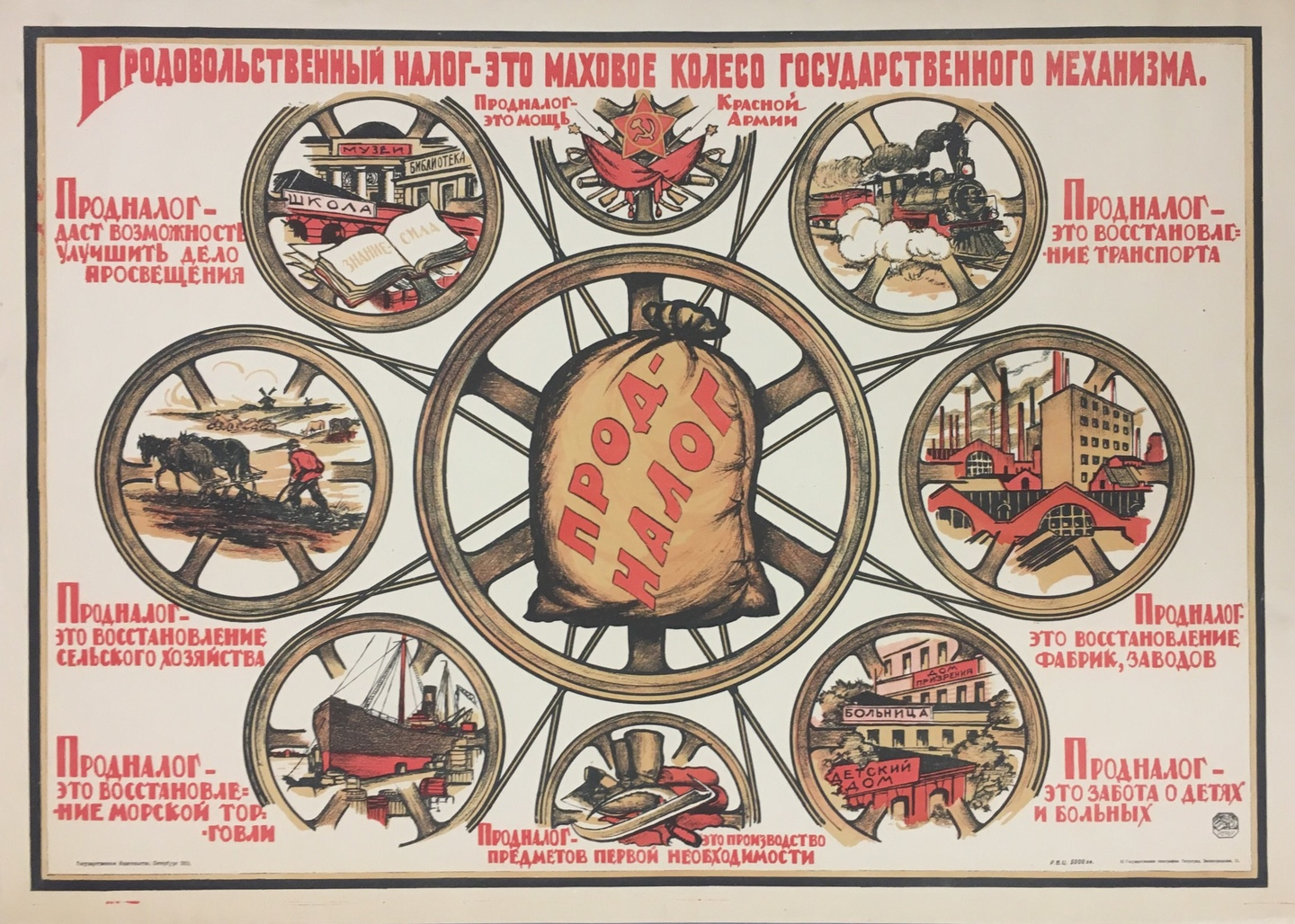
"The Food Tax is the Flywheel of the State Mechanism"

Prodnalog (Russian: продналог, IPA: [prədnɐˈlok], from продовольственный налог, prodovolstvenniy nalog; lit. "food tax";) is the Russian word for a tax on food production, paid in kind in the Soviet Union, and sometimes known as "the tax in kind". Prodnalog replaced prodrazvyorstka (introduced in 1919) and was introduced by a Decree of the All-Russian Central Executive Committee on March 21, 1921. Separate decrees were issued for taxes on particular categories of produce: bread, milk, eggs, meat, oil, etc., as well as on hay, wool, and tobacco. After paying the tax, the peasants were allowed to trade the surplus. It was abolished in 1923 with the introduction of the unified agricultural tax.

== History ==
The transition to prodnalog was the first act of the New Economic Policy and a necessary incentive for increasing Soviet agricultural production. The peasants knew in advance how much produce they would have to surrender to the state. The rate of prodnalog was much smaller than prodrazvyorstka. For comparison, in 1920-1921 the peasants surrendered to the state 367 million poods (6,010,000 metric tons) of cereals through prodrazvyorstka, as opposed to 240 million poods (3,930,000 metric tons) in 1921-1922 through prodnalog.

During the first year of introduction of prodnalog, a significant amount of bread and other products remained at peasant households' disposal, which provided an incentive for peasants to develop their own household economy, widen the sowing areas, increase the total number of livestock and productivity of crops. The rate of prodnalog on each kind of agricultural product was determined depending on local conditions and prosperity of a given peasant household. The Soviet state adhered to a policy of progressive taxation; the highest rate of prodnalog had to be paid by the kulak households.

In March and April 1921, a number of Soviet Decrees introduced a natural tax on bread, potato, oilseeds, eggs, dairy products, wool, hides, flax and hemp linen, tobacco etc. The collection of agricultural goods in excess of prodnalog, if necessary, was intended to be made on a barter basis by giving peasants manufactured goods. In order to accelerate the expansion of commodity circulation, create necessary conditions for developing farming and industry and speed up the productive forces of the country, the government encouraged small-scale production all over Soviet Union. The introduction of prodnalog revived the trade and created a different kind of relations between the city and the village.

By the decision of the 12th Congress of the RCP(b) (April 1923), prodnalog and other taxes in the rural areas were exchanged for a universal direct agricultural tax (decree of the All-Russian Central Executive Committee and Sovnarkom on May 10, 1923). The latter would be collected in monetary form starting in 1924, with the establishment of hard currency in the USSR.

However bad harvests combined with the increased needs for hard currency to support the industrialization had led to grain procurement crises. Stalin blamed kulaks for the crisis, and in 1928 extraordinary measures were introduced, including grain confiscation. This crisis was an additional motive for Stalin's forced collectivization.

== See also ==
- Ural-Siberian method of grain procurement
