= Brunolf Baade =

German aeronautical engineer (1904–1969)

- Brunolf Baade 1958
- Born: Carl Wilhelm Brunolf Baade; 15 March 1904; Berlin-Rixdorf, German Empire
- Died: 5 November 1969 (aged 65); Berlin-Buch, East Berlin, East Germany
- Occupation: Aeronautical engineer
- Political party: NSDAP (1937); SED (1954)
- Spouse: Anna Stierle

Brunolf Baade (15 March 1904 – 5 November 1969) was a German aeronautical engineer. He led the team that developed the Baade 152.

== Life ==
=== Early years ===
Brunolf Baade was born in and grew up on the southern edge of Rixdorf (today Neukölln), a densely populated district then just outside the northern perimeter of Berlin. His father was employed in a small electronics company, later rising to the position of assembly and technical worker. Brunolf had two younger sisters. His mother contributed to the household budget by running a small shop. Baade's father came from farming stock, but his mother's ancestry included teachers and artisans, along with the popular 19th-century poet Hofmann von Fallersleben, an ancestor of whom Brunolf Baade was particularly proud.

Baade attended the Emperor Frederick Grammar School (Kaiser-Friedrich-Realgymnasium) locally from 1910, successfully completing his school-leaving exam in 1922. When he was 14, his enthusiastic if brief involvement in some of the preparations for revolution, which erupted in post-World War I Germany, alarmed his parents, who were never themselves particularly political, and suggested that his rather conservative school environment had released a rebellious streak in the boy.

He then studied at the Technische Hochschule in Berlin (now Technische Universität Berlin). He combined his time as a student with an internship at Blohm + Voss in Hamburg, reflecting his ambition at that time to make his career in the booming shipbuilding industry. In Hamburg, he was involved in the construction of the Waskenland. Later, after the ship had been fitted out, she made her maiden voyage to South America. Baade joined the crew as a coal trimmer, and then took the opportunity to explore South America, discovering its people and customs.

=== Building aircraft ===
Returning to Berlin, Baade resumed his studies, now increasingly focused on the potential of the aircraft business, to which he had been introduced during his stay in South America. He joined the Academic Flying League and started to construct gliders, as production and operation of powered aircraft in Germany had been restricted under the provisions of the 1919 Treaty of Versailles. Baade also learned to fly and participated in the annual glider competitions at the Wasserkuppe.

At the end of 1927, he learned to fly powered aircraft, undertaking a course with the still semiclandestine German Flying School (DVS) and obtaining a pilot's licence. Incorporated into his study period with the DVS was an internship that ran from 27 November 1927 to 5 December 1928 and based in Berlin, which involved responsibility for static load testing. He then spent a year at the Technische Hochschule München, concluding his undergraduate studies in 1929, finally obtaining a degree in mechanical engineering. While studying in Bavaria, he also undertook a further brief period of internship, from 16 March to 20 April 1929, with the Bavarian Aircraft Works (BFW / Bayerische Flugzeugwerke AG). For another year, he continued to work for BFW through a period of financial crisis from which some years later the company emerged as Messerschmitt AG. Willy Messerschmitt had been working in partnership with BFW since 1926, and during 1929/30, Baade worked with Messerschmitt on a succession of innovative passenger aircraft, including the M18, the M20, and the M24.

In 1930, Baade traveled to the United States, sent by BFW to hand over some production licenses to American firms. Once there, however, he loosened his ties with BFW, remaining in the US for some years, working at various times for Eastern Aircraft, North American Aviation, and the US subsidiary of the (since 1919 Dutch domiciled) Fokker Company. In 1932, he switched to Goodyear, where his projects are thought to have included work on the futuristic Comet railcar project. That year, too, he married Anna Stierle, a fellow German expatriate.

Despite apparent professional success in North America, Baade maintained his contacts with the German aeronautical industry. During the early 1930s, employment prospects for aircraft engineers in Germany remained dire, but in the second half of 1936, he returned to Germany with his wife. Some ambiguity remains as to whether, at this stage, the couple had expected to stay in Germany, but on 1 October 1936, Baade took a job to the south of Berlin, at Dessau with Junkers. High-calibre aircraft engineers were now becoming highly valued; he achieved rapid promotion and an unexpectedly large salary, and ended up living in a large house, all of which led to the abandonment of any half-formed intentions that he might have had to return across the Atlantic. Appointed to head up the Development and Design Department, Baade stayed with Junkers through World War II. With Junkers, Baade was involved in development of a succession of military aircraft, including the Ju 88, Ju 188, Ju 388, and Ju 287.

=== After the war ===
World War II ended in May 1945, but the previous month, Brunolf Baade had been arrested by an advance party of US soldiers who had surprised him at the outsourced Junkers design office at Raguhn. Baade had been a member of the German Nazi Party since 1937, and was held prisoner by the Americans in Bad Hersfeld for a few months. With his gifts for easy friendship and fluent English, he was able to engage his captors in conversation. Baade later recalled emphatic assurances received at this time from US officers that Germany would be radically deindustrialised and certainly not permitted an aircraft industry for many decades. He said this persuaded him to support a German future determined by the Soviet Union. Between April and June, the Americans occupied Dessau; they comprehensively looted the Junkers library and technical documents, along with the latest aircraft and engines that their soldiers removed apparently as trophies. The Americans released Baade in June 1945, and early in July, American forces were replaced in central Germany by Soviet troops, respecting the division of Germany into occupation zones, already agreed between the Allies at the Yalta Conference. Dessau was now in the Soviet occupation zone.

=== The Soviet Union ===
The Soviets had their own plans for postwar Germany. In fall 1945, Baade was mandated by the Soviet Military Administration to reconstruct the Junkers research facilities, using whatever remained of the wreckage in Dessau factory. The physical assets having been removed by the Americans, the Soviets were chiefly dependent on the "intellectual property" that could be extracted from plant personnel. Engineering and production specialists were required to write down everything they could remember. In the end, more than 2,000 written reports were prepared and shipped to the Soviet Union, though as matters turned out, the subsequent research of the Junkers engineers would be of greater value than their memories of the past.

Progress resumed on the company's advanced jet-engined designs, and work began on rebuilding the former Junkers factory at Dessau. On 22 October 1946, however, as part of Operation Osoaviakhim, Soviet troops appeared outside the houses of selected company personnel who were given four hours to pack their possessions and prepare for a two-week journey by truck to a village north of Moscow, and close to Dubna, called Podberezye (Подберезье). Some were accompanied by their wives, while for others, their families followed a few weeks later. When they arrived, they were confronted by a large complex of otherwise abandoned military buildings containing a considerable quantity of machinery that the Soviets had managed to gather from various formerly German aircraft manufacturing facilities. Never had any doubt existed that the Soviets viewed formerly German military-industrial assets in their occupation zone as Soviet property, and while their commitment to progress on the advanced aircraft design for which Junkers was known was genuine enough, it now transpired that further work would be undertaken in the Soviet Union. Whether Baade was one of those abruptly transported or whether he was already in the Soviet Union is unclear. In any event, Baade, whose talents for leadership and for charming people were not in doubt, quickly emerged as the leader of the relocated German engineers, and as a man whom the Soviets were in large part prepared to trust. Unlike the other German engineers in Podberezye, Baade was apparently allowed to move freely, and was even seen, early in 1947, on holiday in the Crimea, while the other Germans aircraft specialists had no choice but to shiver through the coldest winter the Moscow region had known for many years.

Under Baade, work continued on developing the Junkers Ju 287 jet bomber with its characteristic "forward-swept" wings, now renamed as the OKB-1 EF 131, although progress was hampered by the Soviet refusal to allow the German engineers near the military airfield used to test the prototypes. The project was abandoned in June 1948. The final prototype was adapted for use in the OKB-1 140 programme. The other principal project of Baade's team of involuntary expatriates was the OKB-1 150, a jet bomber on which serious work began in 1948. The design incorporated innovative ideas on materials and design. As with the earlier project, progress was hampered by the inconsistent nature of support from the Soviets in obtaining materials and permitting the German expatriates the freedom necessary to develop and test the aircraft effectively. By 1951, the OKB-1 150 had been developed into a heavy bomber with a range around 1,500 km and a bomb capacity around 600 kg, but in 1952, this project, too, was abandoned, as resources were again reprioritized.

While the German aircraft engineers were enduring the hospitality of the Soviet Union, Germany's Soviet occupation zone had become the German Democratic Republic, formally founded in October 1949. Economic hardships in the young country, exacerbated by the large reparations payments still being made to the Soviet Union and the high cost of supporting the Soviet military presence, are seen by some historians as a key cause, directly and indirectly, of the East German uprising in 1953. High-profile show trials of officially designated enemies of the state were also a feature of East Germany in the first half of the 1950s. Nevertheless, 1953 was also the year in which Stalin died, and as the decade unfolded, the political temperature in Moscow and East Berlin started, slowly, to become a little less nervous, and Moscow's approach to its East German ally became less antagonistic. After a period of uncertainty, in December 1953 Baade persuaded the Soviets to permit his team to develop the abandoned OKB-1 150 bomber into a world-class jet-engined passenger aircraft. Holding the German aeronautical engineers in a village north of Moscow made less sense once the decision had been taken to lift the ban on aircraft manufacture in East Germany with effect from 1955. In 1954, Brunolf Baade relocated to East Germany and joined the country's ruling Socialist Unity Party of Germany (SED) / Sozialistische Einheitspartei Deutschlands). By June 1954, the last of the German engineers had been repatriated back to Germany or Austria.

=== Back in the GDR ===
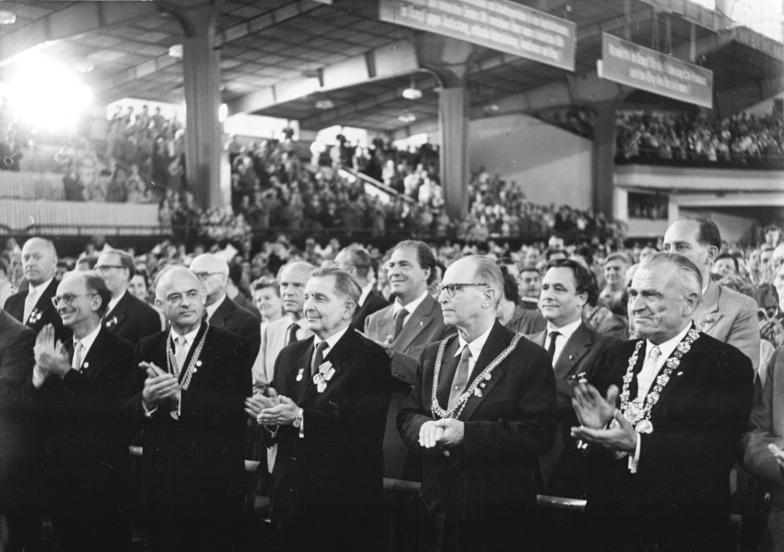
5th party conference of the SED in July 1958. Baade is in the second row, third from the right.

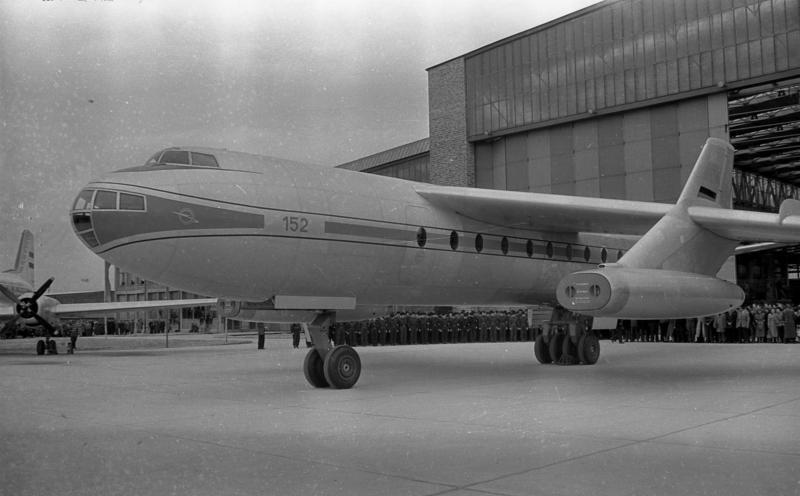
Roll-out of the "152/I V-1" passenger jet (Dresden-Klotzsche, April 1958)

After returning the German Democratic Republic with Soviet assent to the passenger jet promised, Brunolf Baade was given responsibility for developing and producing what came to be known as the 152. In terms of stealing a march on the west, political support from the national leadership was enthusiastic, but sources written with the benefit of hindsight nevertheless surmise that Baade had underestimated the challenges. When his 300 aeronautical engineers arrived back from the Soviet Union, not even space was available to accommodate them. No infrastructure remained to support an aeronautical industry in terms of a supply chain, and although enthusiasm was plentiful, no experienced labour pool existed from which to draw workers. High wages in West Germany and elsewhere were sucking the country dry of its skilled workforce. A survey in 1956 found that only 11% of the specialist workers engaged on the project had worked in aeronautics the last time Germany had had an industry, before 1945. In respect of the development work already undertaken in the Soviet Union, Baade no longer had access to the Soviet test pilots who had been permitted to fly the earlier military versions of the plane. He had been forced to leave key technical documentation behind, and never passed over: whether this resulted from overlapping bureaucratic structures in the Soviet system or from some high level decision was never entirely clear. Nevertheless, Baade's connections in the Soviet Union meant that where key components could not be obtained in East Germany, they would be delivered from the Soviet Union.

Finance was found for the construction of a new development centre at a former Luftwaffe airfield at Klotzsche on the edge of Dresden, and work began on recruitment and training of the necessary workforce. Meanwhile, developments to the west of what had come to be known as the Iron Curtain, such as the prototype maiden flights of the Comet (1949), Boeing 367-80 (1954), and Caravelle (1955) led Baade's team to distance the 152 further from its bomber origins, increasing the seating capacity, fracture load factor, and (marginally) maximum speed without changing the basic architecture of the design or significantly increasing its weight. Time-line slippage was inevitable, and a critical constraint clearly would be development of the Pirna 014 engines. To secure continued funding and political support, Baade was committed to a 1958 launch, but when the 152 appeared outside the hangar at Klotzsche for its high-profile "roll-out" in April 1958, the "152-V1", it did so without engines. A 35-minute first flight was achieved for December 1958 when the prototype was powered not by the Pirna engines designed for the purpose, but by Soviet-built Tumansky RD-9 engines, for which the controls and fuel feed components had been adapted. A second flight took place in March 1959, still with the Soviet engines, to pass low over the prestigious Leipzig Trade Fair and provide photography opportunities, but on this occasion, the engines stalled and "152-V1" crashed while descending towards the Klotzsche airfield, as it rehearsed for the public demonstration scheduled to take place half an hour later. The four people on board were killed, and the accident was attributed to pilot error. Much later, more considered verdicts concur around the suspicion that the engines were starved because of issues involving the fuel feed system and/or the 16 rubber fuel bladders positioned in the wings.

Aircraft development at the Dresden facility and Pirna engine plant ended formally in 1961. In March 1961, Baade became director of the newly founded Institute for Lightweight construction and the economical use of Materials (IfL), based in Dresden-Klotzsche. He had previously held a position, since 1955, as a lecturer at what was at the time the Faculty for Aeronautical Engineering at the Dresden University of Technology.

=== Death ===
Brunolf Baade retired from the Institute when he reached 65, in March 1969. He died on 5 November 1969 in a Berlin hospital or in Dresden, from complications caused by stomach cancer. He is buried at Eichwalde on the edge of Berlin. At least one source indicates that he had never recovered his full health after returning from the Soviet Union in 1954.

Some consensus exists between the sources that Baade's real brilliance lay not so much in his engineering talents as in his personal gifts as a political and institutional fixer. He was an imposing man, capable of great achievements when supported by good technicians and economists.

== Awards and honours ==
- 1959: Patriotic Order of Merit

Many streets are named after him, including the Brunolf-Baade-Straße (Brunolf Baade Street) alongside Berlin's Schönefeld Airport and another in Ludwigsfelde.
