= Andreas Sperl =

President of the Chamber of Industry and Commerce Dresden

Andreas Sperl is the President of the Chamber of Industry and Commerce Dresden. He was the CEO of Elbe Flugzeugwerke until 2022 and former chief financial officer (CFO) of the European aircraft manufacturer Airbus S.A.S until 2006. He was appointed CFO of Airbus in June 2000, responsible for finance, controlling, accounting, as well as internal audits and risk management. He is also a former member of the Airbus executive committee.

== Professional history ==
Sperl began his professional career as a scientific assistant at the University of Münster and joined Daimler Benz AG in 1979 as a specialist in the Participations department. He was appointed assistant to the president and chief executive officer in 1982, and in 1986 became director of group planning.

Between 1989 and 1991, Sperl was chairman of the management board of Otomarsan, which later became Mercedes-Benz Türk, and from 1991 to 1995 he was general director of Mercedes-Benz Mexico.

From 1995 until he was appointed chief financial officer of Airbus, Sperl held the position of executive vice president of DaimlerChrysler Aerospace in Munich, responsible for mergers and acquisitions.
