= Scissors Crisis =

1923 economic crises in Soviet Union

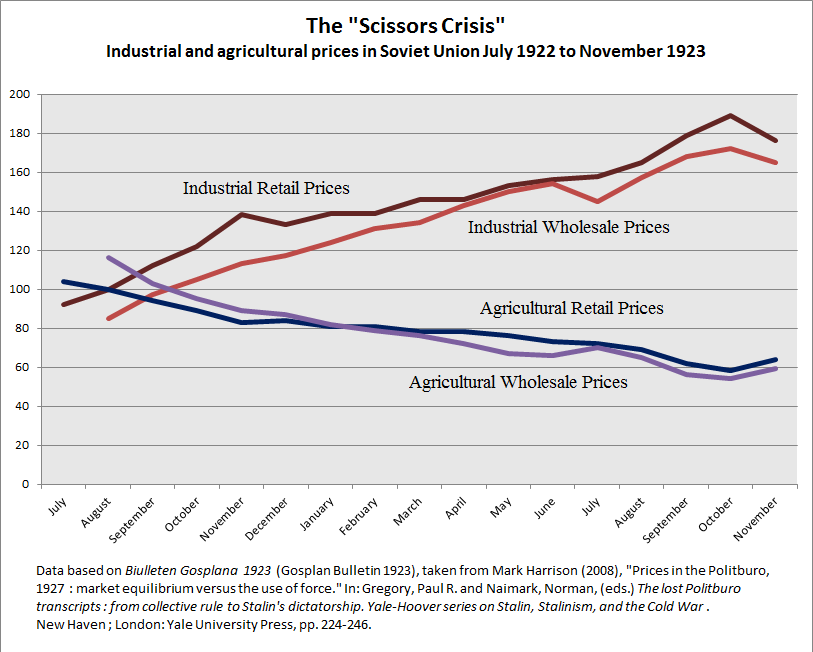
The Scissors: retail and wholesale prices of agricultural and industrial goods in the Soviet Union July 1922 to November 1923

The Scissors Crisis (Russian: Ножницы цен) was an incident in 1923 in the economy of the Soviet Union during the New Economic Policy (NEP), when there was a widening gap ("price scissors") between industrial and agricultural prices. The term is now used to describe this economic circumstance in many periods of history.

== History ==
Like the blades of a pair of open scissors, the prices of industrial and agricultural goods diverged, reaching a peak in October 1923 where industrial prices were 276 percent of their 1913 levels, while agricultural prices were only 89 percent. The name was coined by Leon Trotsky after the scissors-shaped price/time graph. This meant that peasants' incomes fell, and it became difficult for them to buy manufactured goods. As a result, peasants began to stop selling their produce and focus on subsistence farming, leading to fears of a famine.

The crisis happened because agricultural production had rebounded quickly from the famine of 1921–22 and the Russian Civil War. In contrast, industry took longer to recover, due to the need to rebuild infrastructure. Furthermore, the problem was exacerbated by the government seeking to avoid another famine by keeping the bread grain prices at artificially low levels.

By August 1923, a wave of economic strikes spread across Russian industrial centres. Within the Communist Party, The Declaration of 46 was produced as a signed protest sent to the Central Committee of the RCP. To combat the crisis, the government reduced costs of industrial production by cutting staff, rationalizing production, controlling wages and benefits and reducing the influence of traders and middlemen (NEPmen) by expanding the network of consumer cooperatives (such as the People's Commissariat of Trade).

As a result of these actions, the imbalance started to decrease. By April 1924, the agricultural price index had reached 92 (compared to its 1913 level) and the industrial index had fallen to 131.

After the 1927 crisis, Soviet economist Lev Gatovsky performed an analysis and actively participated in the planning for the state intervention that followed.

A similar crisis had occurred in 1916, when for example the price of rye rose by 47% whereas that of a pair of boots rose by 334%.

== See also ==
- Ural-Siberian method
- Industrialization in the Soviet Union
- Collectivization in the Soviet Union
- Soviet grain procurement crisis of 1928
- Monetary reform in the Soviet Union, 1922–24#Price scissors
- Primitive socialist accumulation#Economic Research on Preobrazhensky's Work
