= New Economic Policy =

1921–28 Soviet economic policy theorized by Lenin

The New Economic Policy (NEP) (Russian: новая экономическая политика (НЭП), romanized: novaya ekonomicheskaya politika) was an economic policy of the Soviet Union proposed by Vladimir Lenin in 1921 as a temporary expedient. Lenin characterized the NEP in 1922 as an economic system that would include "a free market and capitalism, both subject to state control", while socialized state enterprises would operate on "a profit basis". Nouveau riche people who took advantage of the NEP were called NEPmen (нэпманы).

The NEP represented an early form of market socialism to foster economic growth for the country, which had suffered severely since World War I and the Russian Civil War. The Soviet authorities partially revoked the complete nationalization of industry (established during the period of war communism of 1918 to 1921) and introduced a mixed economy which allowed private individuals to own small and medium-sized enterprises, while the state continued to control large industries, banks and foreign trade. The Bolshevik government adopted the NEP in the course of the 10th Congress of the All-Russian Communist Party (March 1921). The decree on 21 March 1921: "On the Replacement of Prodrazvyorstka by Prodnalog" abolished forced grain-requisition (prodrazvyorstka) and introduced a tax on farmers, payable in the form of raw agricultural product (prodnalog). Further decrees refined the policy. Other policies included monetary reform (1922–1924) and the attraction of foreign capital.

NEP was abandoned in 1928 with Joseph Stalin's "Great Break" and gradually phased out during 1928–1931.

== Beginnings ==
In November 1917, the Bolsheviks seized control of key centres in Russia. This led to the Russian Civil War of 1917–1922, which pitted the Bolsheviks and their allies against the Whites and other counter-revolutionary forces. During this period the Bolsheviks attempted to administer Russia's economy purely by decree, a policy of the War Communism. Farmers and factory workers were ordered to produce, and food and goods were seized and issued by decree. While this policy enabled the Bolshevik regime to overcome some initial difficulties, it soon caused economic disruptions and hardships. Producers who were not directly compensated for their labor often stopped working, leading to widespread shortages. Combined with the devastation of the war, these were major hardships for the Russian people and diminished popular support for the Bolsheviks.

At the end of the Civil War, the Bolsheviks controlled Russian cities, but 80% of the Russian population were peasants. Although almost all the fighting had occurred outside urban areas, urban populations decreased substantially. The war disrupted transportation (especially railroads), and basic public services. Infectious diseases thrived, especially typhus. Shipments of food and fuel by railroad and by water dramatically decreased. City residents first experienced a shortage of heating oil, then coal, until they resorted to wood. Populations in northern towns (excluding capital cities) declined an average of 24%. Northern towns received less food than towns in the agricultural south. Petrograd alone lost 850,000 people, half of the urban population decline during the Civil War. Hunger and poor conditions drove residents out of cities. Workers migrated south to get peasants' surpluses. Recent migrants to cities left because they still had ties to villages.

Urban workers formed the core of Bolshevik support, so the exodus posed a serious problem. Factory production severely slowed or halted. Factories lacked 30,000 workers in 1919. To survive, city dwellers sold personal valuables, made artisan craft-goods for sale or barter, and planted gardens. The acute need for food drove them to obtain 50–60% of food through illegal trading (see meshochnik). The shortage of cash caused the black market to use a barter system, which was inefficient. Drought and frost led to the Russian famine of 1921, in which millions starved to death, especially in the Volga region, and urban support for the Bolshevik party eroded. When no bread arrived in Moscow in 1921, workers became hungry and disillusioned. They organised demonstrations against the Bolshevik Party's policy of privileged rations, in which the Red Army, Party members, and students received rations first. The Kronstadt rebellion of soldiers and sailors broke out in March 1921, fueled by anarchism and populism.

The economic and political disorganization wrought by war communism, led Lenin and the Bolsheviks to institute structural economic changes in the spring of 1921. The policy of forced food requisitioning, a pillar of the old economic system, was abandoned in favor of a fixed tax on agricultrual output, signaling the inauguration of the New Economic Policy.

In the estimation of Socialist Revolutionary economist Nikolai Kondratiev, this change marked a rejection of a centralized economic regime that excluded competition and the free buying and selling of commodities in favor of a new system of state capitalism, in which "the state emerged as the supreme, leading capitalist entrepreneur" with an interest in retaining direct jurisdiction over those enterprises which could be run profitably on capitalist principles. As these were almost exclusively large-scale concerns, this essentially left all small shops, industrial enterprises, and agriculture a largely free hand to operate on a commercial basis.

Many Bolsheviks saw the policy as a disheartening reversal, including Lenin himself, who nevertheless defended the measure as "taking one step backward to take two steps forward later on".

== Policies ==
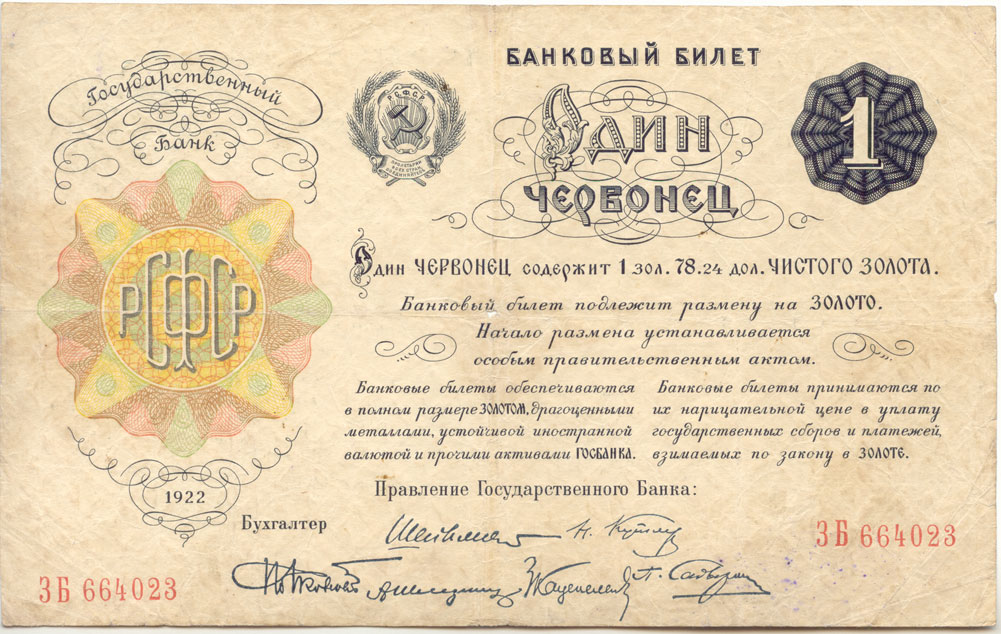
Reestablishment of a stable currency, the gold-backed chervonets, was an essential policy component of the Soviet state's return to a money-based economy.

The laws sanctioned the co-existence of private and public sectors, which were incorporated in the NEP, which was a state oriented "mixed economy". The NEP represented a move away from full nationalization of certain parts of industries. Some kinds of foreign investments were expected by the Soviet Union under the NEP, in order to fund industrial and developmental projects with foreign exchange or technology requirements.

The NEP was primarily a new agricultural policy. The Bolsheviks viewed traditional village life as conservative and backward. With the NEP, the state only allowed private landholdings because the idea of collectivized farming had met strong opposition.

Lenin understood that economic conditions were dire, so he opened up markets to a greater degree of free trade, hoping to motivate the population to increase production. Under the NEP, not only were "private property, private enterprise, and private profit largely restored in Lenin's Russia", but Lenin's regime turned to international capitalism for assistance, willing to provide "generous concessions to foreign capitalism". Lenin took the position that in order to achieve socialism, he had to create "the missing material prerequisites" of modernization and industrial development that made it imperative for Soviet Russia to "fall back on a centrally supervised market-influenced program of state capitalism". Lenin was following Karl Marx's precepts that a nation must first reach "full maturation of capitalism as the precondition for socialist realization". Future years would use the term Marxism–Leninism to describe Lenin's approach to economic policies which were seen to favor policies that moved the country toward communism. The main policy Lenin used was an end to grain requisitions and instead instituted a tax (Prodnalog) on the peasants, thereby allowing them to keep and trade part of their produce. At first, this tax known was paid in kind, that is in the form of agricultural service, but as the currency became more stable in 1924, it was changed to a cash payment. This increased the peasants' incentive to produce, and in response production jumped by 40% after the drought and famine of 1921–22.

NEP economic reforms aimed to take a step back from central planning and allow the economy to become more independent. NEP labor reforms tied labor to productivity, incentivizing the reduction of costs and the redoubled efforts of labor. Labor unions became independent civic organizations. NEP reforms also opened up government positions to the most qualified workers. The NEP gave opportunities for the government to use engineers, specialists, and intelligentsia for cost accounting, equipment purchasing, efficiency procedures, railway construction, and industrial administration. A new class of "NEPmen" thrived. These private traders opened up urban firms hiring up to 20 workers. NEPmen also included rural artisan craftsmen selling their wares on the private market.

== Disagreements in leadership ==
Lenin considered the NEP as a strategic retreat from socialism. He believed it was capitalism, but justified it by insisting that it was a different type of capitalism, "state capitalism", the last stage of capitalism before socialism evolved. While Stalin seemed receptive towards Lenin's shift in policy towards a state capitalist system, he stated in the Twelfth Party Congress in April 1923 that it allowed the "growth of nationalistic and reactionary thinking". He also states that in the recent Central Committee plenum there were speeches made which were incompatible with communism, all of which were ultimately caused by the NEP. These statements were made just after Lenin was incapacitated by strokes.

Leon Trotsky and Joseph Stalin disagreed over how to develop the Soviet economy. Trotsky would elaborate on his views concerning the prospects and challenges associated with the NEP in his work, Towards Socialism or Capitalism?. Trotsky believed in the importance of creating a basis of capital for communism to build on and in Trotsky's mind, the New Economic Policy helped lay a foundation of economic opportunities that would aid in a gradual transition to Collective Farming. Additionally, Trotsky saw the New Economic Policy as a means to prevent the stratification of the classes. Trotsky believed the state should repossess all output to invest in capital formation. On the other hand, Stalin supported the more moderate members of the Communist Party and advocated for a state-run capitalist economy. Stalin would later play on Trotsky's support of New Economic Policy to gain political influence over him by stating that Trotsky lacked confidence in his people. Stalin managed to wrest control of the Communist Party from Trotsky, and after defeating the Trotsky faction, Stalin reversed his opinions about economic policy. Stalin believed that creating a socialist society was achievable in the Soviet Union without aid from outside sources or capitalist ideology. Backed by Stalin's Bolshevik-leaning ideology, he believed there was no need to build a basis of capital upon communism and implemented the first five-year plan.

== Results ==
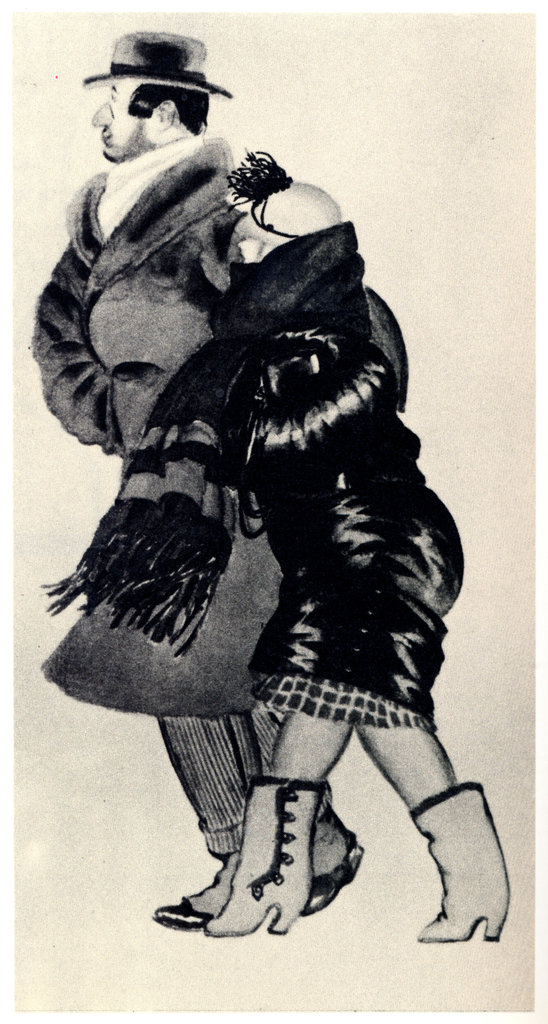
"Nepmen", caricature by Dmitry Kardovsky, 1920s

After the New Economic Policy was instituted, agricultural production increased greatly. In order to stimulate economic growth, farmers were given the opportunity by the Bolsheviks to sell portions of their crops to the government in exchange for monetary compensation. Farmers now had the option to sell some of their produce, giving them a personal economic incentive to produce more grain. This incentive, coupled with the breakup of the quasi-feudal landed estates, resulted in agricultural production surpassing pre-Revolution levels. The agricultural sector became increasingly reliant on small family farms, while heavy industries, banks, and financial institutions remained under state ownership and control. This led to an imbalance in the economy where the agricultural sector started to grow much faster than heavy industry. To maintain their income, factories raised prices. Due to the rising cost of manufactured goods, peasants had to produce much more wheat to buy these consumer goods, which increased supply and thus lowered the price of agricultural products. This fall in prices of agricultural goods and the sharp rise in prices of industrial products was dubbed by Trotsky the "Scissors Crisis" (due to the crossing of the representation of the prices of the two types of product on graphs). Peasants began withholding their surpluses in the expectation of higher prices, or sold them to "NEPmen" (traders and middle-men) who re-sold them at high prices. Many members of the Communist Party considered this an exploitation of urban consumers. To lower the price of consumer goods, the state took measures to decrease inflation and enacted reforms of the internal practices of the factories. The government also fixed prices, in an attempt to halt the scissor effect.

The NEP succeeded in creating an economic recovery after the devastation of World War I, the Russian Revolution, and the Russian Civil War. By 1925, in the wake of Lenin's NEP, a "major transformation was occurring politically, economically, culturally and spiritually. Small-scale and light industries were largely in the hands of private entrepreneurs or cooperatives". By 1928, agricultural and industrial production had been restored to the 1913 (pre-World War I) level. The austere social practices and social-equality theories of revolution and war communism gave way to a more stratified society in which a new bureaucratic elite flaunted conspicuous status symbols: Vladimir Sosnovsky dubbed this "the automobile-harem factor".

=== NEPmen ===
NEPmen (Russian: нэпманы, romanized: nepmani) were businesspeople in the early Soviet Union who took advantage of the opportunities for private trade and small-scale manufacturing provided under the NEP.

The biggest group of the 3 million or so NEPmen were engaged in handicrafts in the countryside, but those who traded or ran small businesses in the cities faced the most negative attitudes because some amassed considerable fortunes. One of the main objectives of the Communist Party was to promote socialism, and the capitalist behavior of the NEPmen challenged that goal. However, given the economic benefits that NEPmen provided, the government allowed their existence. As they gained a better standard of living compared to their poor, working class counterparts, NEPmen became reviled and stereotyped as greedy. Among ordinary folk, traditional hatred of profiteers found focus in the NEPmen, some of it acquiring an antisemitic tinge. That was reinforced by the official media representation of NEPmen as vulgar nouveaux riches. As Joseph Stalin consolidated his power, he moved aggressively to end the NEP and to put NEPmen out of business, eventually abolishing private commerce in 1931.

==== Under Lenin ====
When the NEP was introduced by Lenin in 1921, many NEPmen took advantage of the chance to establish themselves in Soviet society. Lenin's plan was to use the NEP as a temporary measure to develop rural Russia to proletarianize the peasant class. The NEPmen's role in the new economic climate was to help spread trade to the parts of the country the government could not reach. In fact, in 1922 the NEPmen accounted for almost 75% of the Soviet Union's retail trade. However, not everyone in the country was happy about the NEP and the emergence of NEPmen. Many Bolsheviks saw the NEPmen as competition and feared that they would end up in positions of power, turning the Soviet Union into a capitalist nation. Lenin was highly criticized by his party members for the NEP because it was essentially capitalism controlled by the state. The disapproval of the NEP by many members of society greatly affected a NEPman's quality of life. They were closely scrutinized and heavily taxed, and their right to vote was revoked. Socialist advertising was also produced to oppose the NEPmen's capitalistic activities, and this war on capitalism became one of the main goals of Soviet socialist advertising at the time.

Lenin combated this slander and disapproval by asserting that the NEP was just a temporary measure required to repair the Soviet's crumbling economy. He also pointed out that the NEPmen were helping the economy because they could be heavily taxed, providing more revenue for the state. The increase in revenue would aid the government in securing its plans for a socialist society, while also strengthening the economy. In the eyes of those who supported the policy, NEPmen were nothing more than a stepping stone, providing stability for the creation of the Soviet socialist state in that era. However, by the time of Lenin's death in 1924, the NEPmen were being phased out of society to make room for socialist values, and during the Stalin era, NEPman became a dying breed.

==== Under Stalin ====
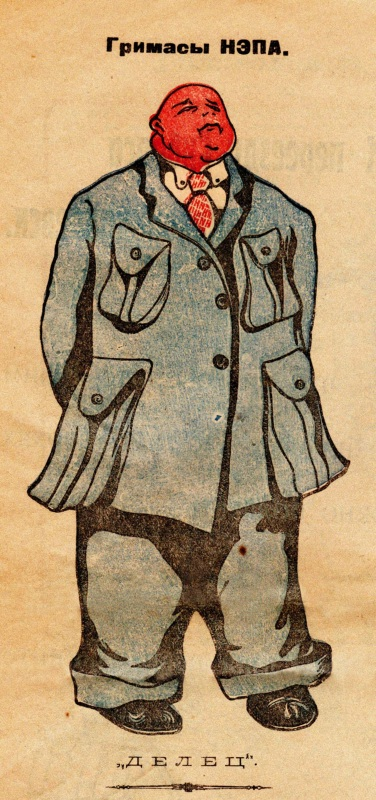
"Businessman", from the series "Grimaces of NEP", 1922, by artist Veniamin Romov.

In 1922, Lenin had his second stroke, which affected his ability to lead. Before his death in 1924, an obvious power struggle between Stalin and Leon Trotsky had begun. Given the instability in Russian leadership, NEPmen gained a small window of opportunity. After a dramatic drop in sales directly from state industry to NEPmen (14.7% to 2.1%) in 1924, the Soviet economy once again relied heavily on NEPmen for stabilization. Decrees in 1925 and 1926 reduced taxes, state loans were no longer mandatory, and employee penalties were alleviated (i.e., lower number of employees, lower taxes). Although NEPmen enjoyed a more hospitable economic and social environment, it did not indicate that they were universally accepted, but rather tolerated. Stalin frequently expressed his disdain for the NEP and NEPmen. It was public knowledge that he was frustrated with members within the Communist Party who supported the policy.

During Stalin's rise to power, his moderate position was opposed by both the anti-NEP left wing of the party led by Trotsky, and the pro-NEP right wing led by Bukharin. By October 1927, Zinoviev and Trotsky, Stalin's main opposition, had been removed from the Central Committee, and could no longer threaten Stalin. As a result, Stalin gained the maneuverability to propose a new economic strategy, and the freedom to develop means of eliminating private entrepreneurship. In 1928, Stalin reignited the attitudes of the October Revolution era, and aggressively propagated anti-NEPmen propaganda.

In the same year, the NEP was replaced by Stalin's Five Year Plan, suggesting that NEPmen would also be replaced. However, some scholars argue that a modified version of NEPmen existed into the 1930s. Nonetheless, with Stalin's increasingly unlimited power, tensions escalated, and force became an acceptable means of removing the wealthier class or the "enemy of the people".

== End of NEP ==
By 1924, the year of Lenin's death, Nikolai Bukharin had become the foremost supporter of the New Economic Policy. The USSR abandoned NEP in 1928 after Joseph Stalin obtained a position of leadership during the Great Break. Stalin was initially noncommitted to the NEP. Stalin then enacted a system of collectivization during the Grain Procurement Crisis of 1928 and saw the need to quickly accumulate capital for the vast industrialization programme introduced with the Five Year Plans starting in 1928. The Bolsheviks hoped that the USSR's industrial base would reach the level of capitalist countries in the West, to avoid losing a future war. (Stalin proclaimed, "Either we do it, or we shall be crushed".) Stalin asserted that the grain crisis was caused by kulaks – relatively wealthy farmers who allegedly "hoarded" grain and participated in "speculation of agricultural produce". He also considered peasant farms too small to support the massive agricultural demands of the Soviet Union's push for rapid industrialization, and Soviet economists claimed that only large collective farms could support such an expansion. Accordingly, Stalin imposed collectivization of agriculture. Land held by the kulaks was seized and given to agricultural cooperatives (kolkhozes and sovkhozes).

Lenin and his followers saw the NEP as an interim measure. However, it proved highly unpopular with the Left Opposition in the Bolshevik Party because of its compromise with some capitalist elements and the relinquishment of state control. The Left saw the NEP as a betrayal of Communist principles, and believed it would have a negative long-term economic effect, so they wanted a fully planned economy instead. In particular, the NEP fostered a class of traders ("NEPmen") whom the Communists regarded as "class enemies" of the working class. Vladimir Lenin is quoted to have said "For a year we have been retreating. On behalf of the Party we must now call a halt. The purpose pursued by the retreat has been achieved. This period is drawing, or has drawn, to a close". which implies Lenin believed the NEP should have ended in his lifetime. Lenin had also been known to say about NEP, "We are taking one step backward, to take two steps forward later", suggesting that, though the NEP pointed in another direction, it would provide the economic conditions necessary for socialism eventually to evolve.

After only seven years of NEP, Lenin's successor Stalin introduced full central planning, re-nationalized much of the economy, and from the late 1920s onwards introduced a policy of rapid industrialization. Stalin's collectivization of agriculture was his most notable departure from the NEP approach.

== International influence ==
Pantsov and Levine see many of the post-Mao reform and opening up policies of the Chinese Communist Party's former paramount leader Deng Xiaoping away from a command economy and towards a socialist market economy during the 1980s as influenced by the NEP: "It will be recalled that Deng Xiaoping himself had studied Marxism from the works of the Bolshevik leaders who had propounded NEP. He drew on ideas from NEP when he spoke of his own reforms. In 1985, he openly acknowledged that 'perhaps' the most correct model of socialism was the New Economic Policy of the USSR".

During the Great Debate in Cuba, views diverged on whether Cuba should follow the Soviet economic model or an alternative model proposed by Che Guevara. In taking a position that diverged from the Soviet model, Guevara contended that the Soviet model had developed following the historically contingent NEP rather than objective Marxist principles.

== See also ==
- Dirigisme
- Hyperinflation in early Soviet Russia
- Left Opposition
- Kulak
- Mixed economy
- Neoauthoritarianism (China)
- New Russians
- New Soviet man
- Perestroika
- Primitive socialist accumulation
- Scissors Crisis
- Soviet-type economic planning
- Social market economy
- Socialist market economy
- Socialist-oriented market economy
- Market socialism
- Liberal socialism
- Social democracy
- Social corporatism
- State capitalism

== Multimedia ==
- Vladimir I. Lenin: About Natural Tax (Text of the speech in Russian, Record).
