= Zavyalovo =

Zavyalovo (Russian: Завьялово) is the name of several rural localities in Russia:

- Zavyalovo, Altai Krai, a selo in Zavyalovsky Selsoviet of Zavyalovsky District of Altai Krai
- Zavyalovo, Iskitimsky District, Novosibirsk Oblast, a selo in Iskitimsky District, Novosibirsk Oblast
- Zavyalovo, Toguchinsky District, Novosibirsk Oblast, a selo in Toguchinsky District, Novosibirsk Oblast
- Zavyalovo, Omsk Oblast, a selo in Zavyalovsky Rural Okrug of Znamensky District of Omsk Oblast
- Zavyalovo, Perm Krai, a village in Sivinsky District of Perm Krai
- Zavyalovo, Tyumen Oblast, a village in Tobolovsky Rural Okrug of Ishimsky District of Tyumen Oblast
- Zavyalovo, Udmurt Republic, a selo in Zavyalovsky Selsoviet of Zavyalovsky District of the Udmurt Republic
