= Elbe Flugzeugwerke =

German aircraft manufacturing company

Coordinates: 51.129°N 13.773°E

Elbe Flugzeugwerke GmbH
- Type: Joint venture
- Industry: Aerospace
- Founded: 1955; 71 years ago (as VEB Flugzeugwerke Dresden); 1990; 36 years ago (as Elbe Flugzeugwerke)
- Headquarters: Dresden, Germany
- Key people: Andreas Sperl
- Products: Aircraft conversion
- Revenue: €225.2 million
- Owners: ST Engineering (55%); Airbus (45%)
- Number of employees: 1,143
- Website: www.elbeflugzeugwerke.com

Elbe Flugzeugwerke GmbH (lit. 'Elbe aircraft factory', commonly abbreviated as EFW) is an aerospace manufacturer based in Dresden, Germany.

It was established during 1955 as VEB Flugzeugwerke Dresden (VEB), in what was then the German Democratic Republic. Early projects included the licensed production of Ilyushin Il-14 airliners and the development of an indigenously developed four-engine jetliner, the Baade 152, which was terminated during the flight-testing phase following the loss of the first prototype. Between 1961 and 1990, the majority of VEB's activities centered around support and overhaul services for Soviet-designed fighters and helicopters for Warsaw Pact air forces, as well as the civil airliners of the GDR's national airline Interflug.

The company underwent drastic restructuring following the reunification of Germany in 1990, quickly becoming aligned with Airbus. EFW is a joint venture between Singapore-based ST Engineering (55%) and the multinational aerospace company Airbus (45%) Since the end of the Cold War, the company has largely focused on servicing airliners and the conversion of passenger airliners into dedicated freighter and aerial refuelling tanker configurations. EFW is also a supplier of Airbus, producing fiber composite sheets for aircraft interiors.

== History ==
=== Background and early years ===
Following the end of the Second World War in Europe, Germany was divided into West Germany and East Germany. In the East, the Soviet Union became politically dominant over the region; Soviet officials sought to obtain all possible aerospace-related material in East Germany, the engineers and scientists associated with such projects were deported to the Soviet Union. During October 1946, it was announced that all East German aerospace-related projects would be transferred to the Soviet Union, while material that could not be transferred was deliberately destroyed. Following the formation of German Democratic Republic during 1949, many of the deported German scientists were allowed to return to East Germany and to practice their professions once more.

During 1955, the company was founded under the name VEB Flugzeugwerke Dresden and established its base in the German city of Dresden. The use of the Junkers site in Dessau was rejected for confidentiality reasons, as it was located underneath a West Berlin Air Corridor. The revival of the East German aerospace industry had occurred at a faster rate than that of neighboring West Germany. VEB was not the first effort to establish new aeronautical facilities in East Germany; however, following a popular uprising during 1953, officials chose to publicly renounce military aviation ambitions in favor of civil aircraft.

VEB was initially engaged in the manufacture of Ilyushin Il-14 airliners, which were built under license. Additionally, VEB also embarked on the development of an indigenously developed four-engine jetliner, known as the Baade 152, which was intended to be the German Democratic Republic's (GDR) first passenger jet. The company had intended to develop the 152 as a commercial endeavor; an assembly line capable of producing up to 18 aircraft per year was to be established in Dresden to manufacture the type. As envisioned, the 152 would have been developed initially as a 57-seater airliner, plans were made to accommodate alternative seating layouts, such as a high-capacity 72-passenger configuration or a more spacious 42-passenger arrangement. At one point, up to 8,000 personnel were employed on this program, along with an additional 25,000 jobs across numerous other companies involved in the supply chain; these were bundled in a combined Volkseigener Betrieb during 1958.

A total of three airworthy 152 prototypes were constructed, two of which actually being flown. However, flight testing of the 152 yielded tragedy and disappointment. On 30 April 1958, the second prototype crashed during one such flight, resulting in the airliner's development being delayed. The reasons for the crash were never fully investigated and the results of the limited investigation were only made public in 1990. The loss has been attributed as having been a major setback to the 152 program and having subsequently played a factor in its termination.

On 28 February 1961, the East German government issued an order for the dissolution of its national aeronautical industry; this decision was reportedly heavily influenced by the Soviet Union, which was then promoting its own similar-sized airliner, the Tupolev Tu-124; despite earlier promises, it no longer wanted to purchase any Baade 152s or provide further support towards its development. Similar curtailing of autonomous aviation-related program was carried out throughout the Eastern Bloc during this period. Following the GDR's instruction to stop work on all indigenous aircraft programs, VEB underwent heavy restructuring, becoming a maintenance facility for both MiG combat aircraft and Mil helicopters of various Warsaw Pact air forces. Following the delivery of East German airline Interflug's Airbus A310 jetliners in 1989, VEB undertook servicing and overhaul work for the fleet.

=== Post-Cold War activities ===
Following the reunification of Germany in 1990, VEB quickly became heavily supported by Deutsche Airbus, based in Hamburg. On 27 April 1990, Elbe Flugzeugwerke GmbH (EFW) was founded by DASA and Airbus. After the merger of DASA, Aérospatiale-Matra and Construcciones Aeronáuticas to form EADS in 2000, the new entity became EFW's sole owner.

Since 1993, EFW has been a supplier of fiber-reinforced furnishing components, which have been commonly used throughout Airbus' airliners. It reportedly has a capacity to manufacture up to 200,000 sandwich components per year. During 1996, the company started converting passenger aircraft into freighters. Early on, it converted Airbus A300 and Airbus A310 airliners, a process which takes about four months to complete, which includes higher Aircraft maintenance checks. EFW has also undertaken the conversion of Airbus A310 MRTT and Airbus A330 MRTT aerial refuelling tanker aircraft. At one stage, the firm was designated to deliver the first four prototype Northrop Grumman KC-45 tanker planes (without military tanker equipment).

At one point, EFW was co-proprietor of Airbus Freighter Conversion GmbH joint venture, which was also based in Dresden. Ownership was divided between Airbus, the Russian government-owned United Aircraft Corporation and Irkut; it was established in 2007 with the aim of creating a second production line for converting freighters, to be based in Lukhovitsy, Russia. EFW had the largest stake of 32%, Airbus had 18% while the Russian shareholders each owned 25%. However, during 2011, this program was terminated for financial reasons without ever having converted any aircraft.

In the 2010s, EFW's management decided that a greater proportion of the company's revenue ought to be derived from MRO activity. During 2015, EFW was approved as a full maintenance provider for the Airbus A380, thus becoming one of the only companies able to offer overhaul, servicing, and structural improvement packages to airlines; customers have included Lufthansa and Emirates.

Lower demand for A300-600 freighter conversions led EFW to concentrate on converting A330-200s and A330-300s to freighters. On 1 December 2017, launch customer DHL Express took delivery of the first Airbus A330 freighter conversion. The programme has since expanded. By mid-2025 it had delivered the first A330P2F freighter under its new conversion program and secured multi‑aircraft freighter conversion orders. During February 2018, it was announced that EFW had also launched a freighter conversion program for the Airbus A321.

In February 2013, ST Aerospace purchased an initial 35% stake in EFW. In February 2016, ST Aerospace announced that it completed the purchase of another 20%, giving the firm an overall stake of 55%, rendering EFW a subsidiary of ST Aero.
