= Forward-swept wing =

Aircraft wing configuration

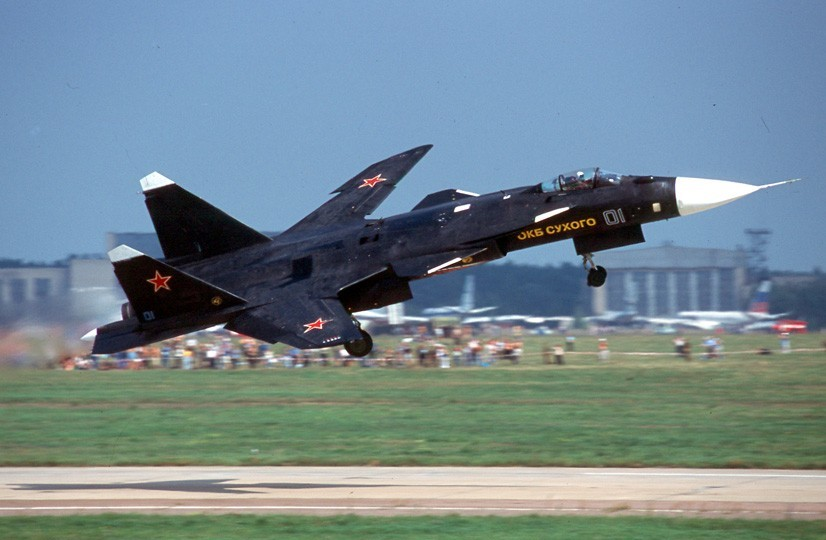
Forward-swept wing of the Sukhoi Su-47

A forward-swept wing or reverse-swept wing is an aircraft wing configuration in which the quarter chord line of the wing, from root to tip, has a forward sweep. Typically, the leading edge also sweeps forward. Forward-swept wings allow aircraft to safely sustain higher attack angles, making them more maneuverable, but introduce other aerodynamic instabilities.

Research into forward-swept wings began in the early 20th century, continuing after World War II in a limited capacity.

== Characteristics ==
The forward-swept wing configuration has a number of characteristics which increase as the sweep angle increases.

=== Stall characteristics ===
Any swept wing tends to be unstable in a stall. On a backward-swept wing, the wing tips stall first; this causes a pitch-up force that can worsen the stall and make recovery difficult. This effect is less significant with forward-swept wings, as the rearward root produces greater lift and provides stability. However, sufficient aeroelastic deflection can counteract this behavior by increasing the angle of attack at the wing tips to such an extent that the tips stall first, negating one of the main advantages of a forward sweep design.

Composite materials allow the tailoring of aeroelastic behavior so that as the wing approaches a stall, it twists to reduce the angle of attack at the tip. This ensures that the stall occurs at the root, making it more predictable and allowing the ailerons to retain full control.

=== Advantages ===
==== Main spar location ====
The aft location of the main wing spar may lead to a more efficient interior arrangement with more usable space. In the case of bombers such as the prototype Junkers Ju 287, bombs can be dropped with a minimal effect on the aircraft's center of mass.

==== Inward spanwise flow ====
Spanwise airflow over a forward-swept wing is the reverse of flow over a backward-swept wing.

Air flowing over any swept wing tends to move spanwise towards the aftmost end of the wing. On a backward-swept wing, this is outwards towards the tip, while on a forward-swept wing, it is inwards towards the root. As a result, the dangerous tip stall condition of a rearward-swept design becomes a safer and more controllable root stall on a forward-swept design. This allows for the retention of full aileron control during a stall, and also means that drag-inducing leading-edge slots or other devices are not required. At transonic speeds, shockwaves build up first at the root rather than the tip, again helping ensure effective aileron control.

With air flowing inwards, wingtip vortices and their accompanying drag are reduced. Instead, the fuselage acts as a very large wing fence; since wings are generally larger at the root, this raises the maximum lift coefficient, allowing for a smaller wing. As a result, maneuverability is improved, especially at high angles of attack.

=== Disadvantages ===
==== Yaw instability ====
When a swept-wing aircraft yaws sideways, one wing retreats while the other advances. With backward-swept wings, this leads to Dutch roll, which is an unpleasant but ultimately stable flight condition. On a forward-swept design, this reduces the sweep of the rearward wing. This increases its drag, pushing it further back and ultimately leading to directional instability.

==== Aeroelasticity ====
One of the drawbacks of forward-swept wings is the increased chance of divergence, an aeroelastic consequence of the lift force on forward swept wings twisting the tip upwards under increased lift. On a forward-swept design, this causes a positive feedback loop that increases the angle of incidence at the tip, resulting in yet more lift and additional changes in wing shape. The effect of divergence increases with speed; the maximum safe speed below which this does not happen is the divergence speed of the aircraft.

Such an increase in tip lift under load causes the wing to tighten into turns, and may result in a spiral dive from which recovery is not possible. In the worst case, the wing structure can be stressed to the point of failure.

At large angles of sweep and high speeds, in order to build a structure stiff enough to resist deforming yet light enough to be practicable, materials such as advanced composites may be required. Composite fibers can also be aligned to influence deformation into a more favorable shape, impacting stall behavior and other characteristics.

== History ==
=== Pre-WWII studies ===
Viktor Belyayev tested the BP-2 and BP-3 forward-swept gliders in 1934 and 1935. Other prewar design studies include the Polish PWS Z-17, Z-18 and Z-47 "Sęp" series.

=== World War II and aftermath ===
Forward-swept wing designs were further developed during World War II, independently in Germany, the Soviet Union, Japan, and the United States. An early flying example was the Soviet Belyayev DB-LK, a 1940 twin-boom design with forward-swept outer wing sections and backwards-swept tips. It reportedly flew well. Belyayev's proposed Babochka research aircraft was cancelled following the German invasion.

Numerous fighters, bombers, and other military aircraft in WWII can be described as having forward-swept wings due to the average chord of their wings being forward-sweeping. However, these designs almost always utilized a rearward-swept leading edge, which would technically render them as high aspect ratio trapezoidal wings.

The American Cornelius Mallard flew on 18 August 1943. The Mallard was powered by a single engine, but it was followed by the Cornelius XFG-1 prototypes, which were flying fuel tanks, unpowered and designed for towing by larger aircraft. These Cornelius designs were unusual for being not only forward-swept but also tailless.

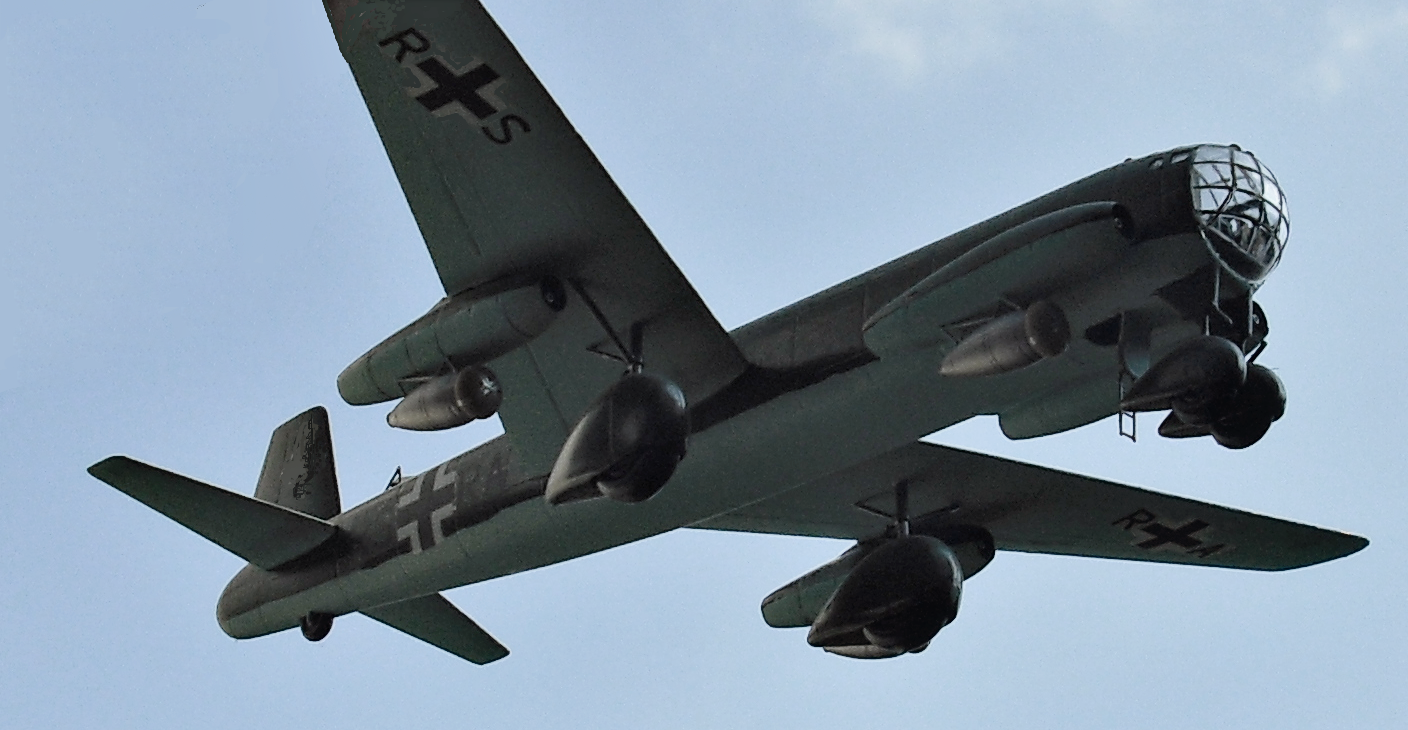
A model of the Ju 287 V1

In Germany, Hans Wocke was studying the problems of swept wings at the near-sonic speeds of which the new jet engines were capable. He recognised many of the advantages that a forward sweep offered over the backwards-swept designs then being developed, and also understood the implications of aeroelastic bending and yaw instability. His first such design to fly was the Junkers Ju 287 on 16 August 1944. Flight tests confirmed the low-speed advantages but also soon revealed the expected problems, preventing high-speed trials.

Wocke and the incomplete Ju 287 V3 prototype were captured in 1945 and taken to Moscow, where the aircraft was completed and flown the next year as the OKB-1 EF 131. The later EF 140 was essentially an EF 131 airframe equipped with a pair of more powerful Mikulin-designed jet engines. In 1948, the Soviet Union developed the Tsybin LL-3. The LL-3 prototype would have a great influence on the Sukhoi SYB-A, which first flew in 1982.

When German research reached the United States after the war, a number of proposals were put forward. These included the Convair XB-53 supersonic bomber and forward-swept variants of the North American P-51 Mustang, Bell X-1, and Douglas D-558-1. The Bell proposal reached the wind tunnel testing stage, where the problems of aeroelasticity were confirmed. The structural issues confirmed by the Ju 287 and X-1 studies proved severe enough that the materials available at the time could not make a wing strong and stiff enough without also making it too heavy to be practical. As a result, high-speed forward sweep designs were abandoned until many years later, when advancements in materials science occurred.

=== Post-WWII general aviation ===
LET L-13 two-seat glider

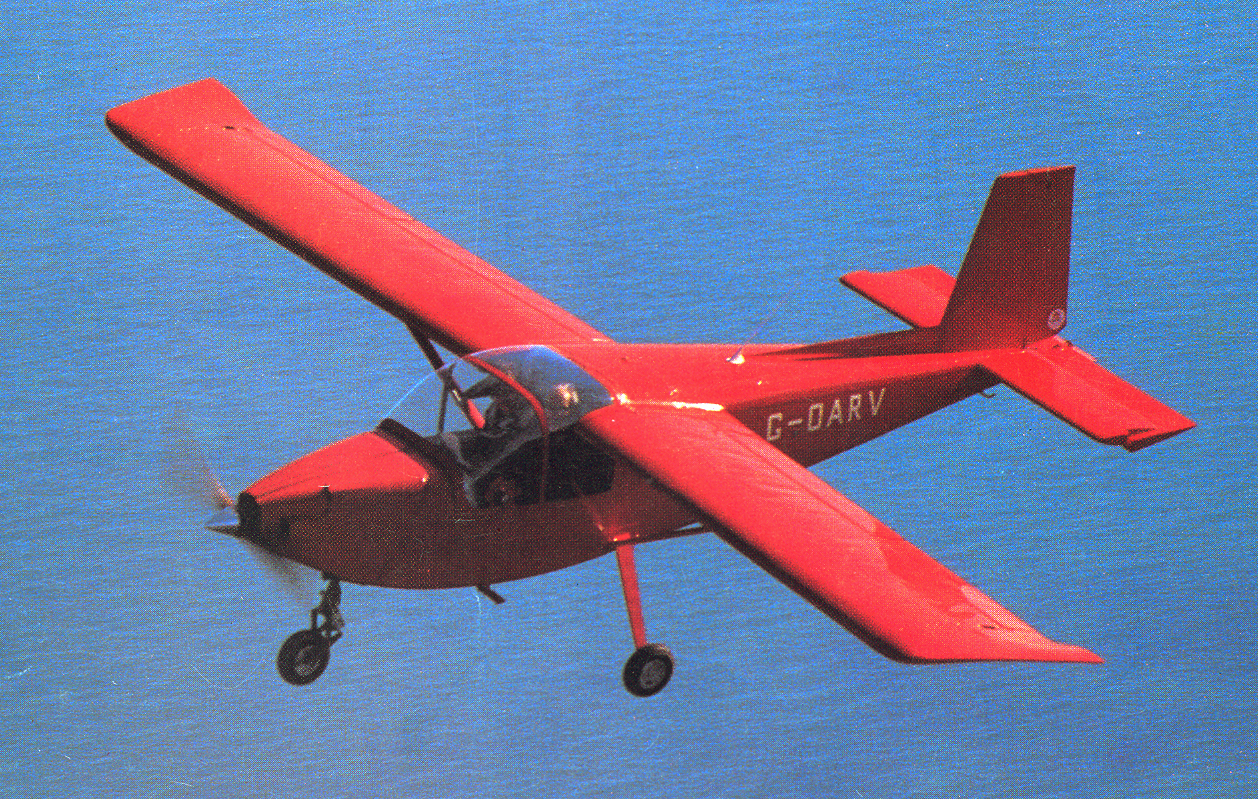
ARV Super2

Small amounts of sweep do not cause serious problems, and even a moderate forward sweep allows a significant rearward movement of the main spar attachment point and carry-through structure.

In 1954, Wocke returned to East Germany, moving to West Germany shortly afterwards and joining Hamburger Flugzeugbau as their chief designer. In Hamburg, Wocke completed work on the HFB 320 Hansa Jet business jet, which first flew in 1964. The forward sweep enabled the main spar to be moved behind the cabin for a less intrusive interior layout.

Moderate forward sweep has been used for similar reasons in many designs, mainly sailplanes and light aircraft. Many high-wing training gliders with two seats in tandem, such as the LET L-13 Blaník and Schleicher ASK 13, have slightly forward-swept wings in order to prevent the wing root from obscuring the rear occupant's lateral visibility. Examples include:

- The Cessna NGP, a prototype light aircraft intended to eventually replace the Cessna 172 and Cessna 182.
- The Mooney M20, with a modest forward sweep, wherein the leading edge is almost straight but the trailing edge and quarter-chord line are swept.
- The ARV Super2, Bölkow Junior, CZAW Parrot, and Saab Safari, which all have shoulder wings for increased visibility, necessitating a forward sweep to position the wing root behind the pilots’ heads so it does not obscure their view to the sides.
- The Rutan Boomerang, a prototype piston-engined twin-fuselage design which would allow for safe handling in the event of a single engine failure.
- The SZD-9 Bocian and SZD-50 Puchacz Polish multi-purpose two-seat sailplanes.

=== High-speed aviation ===
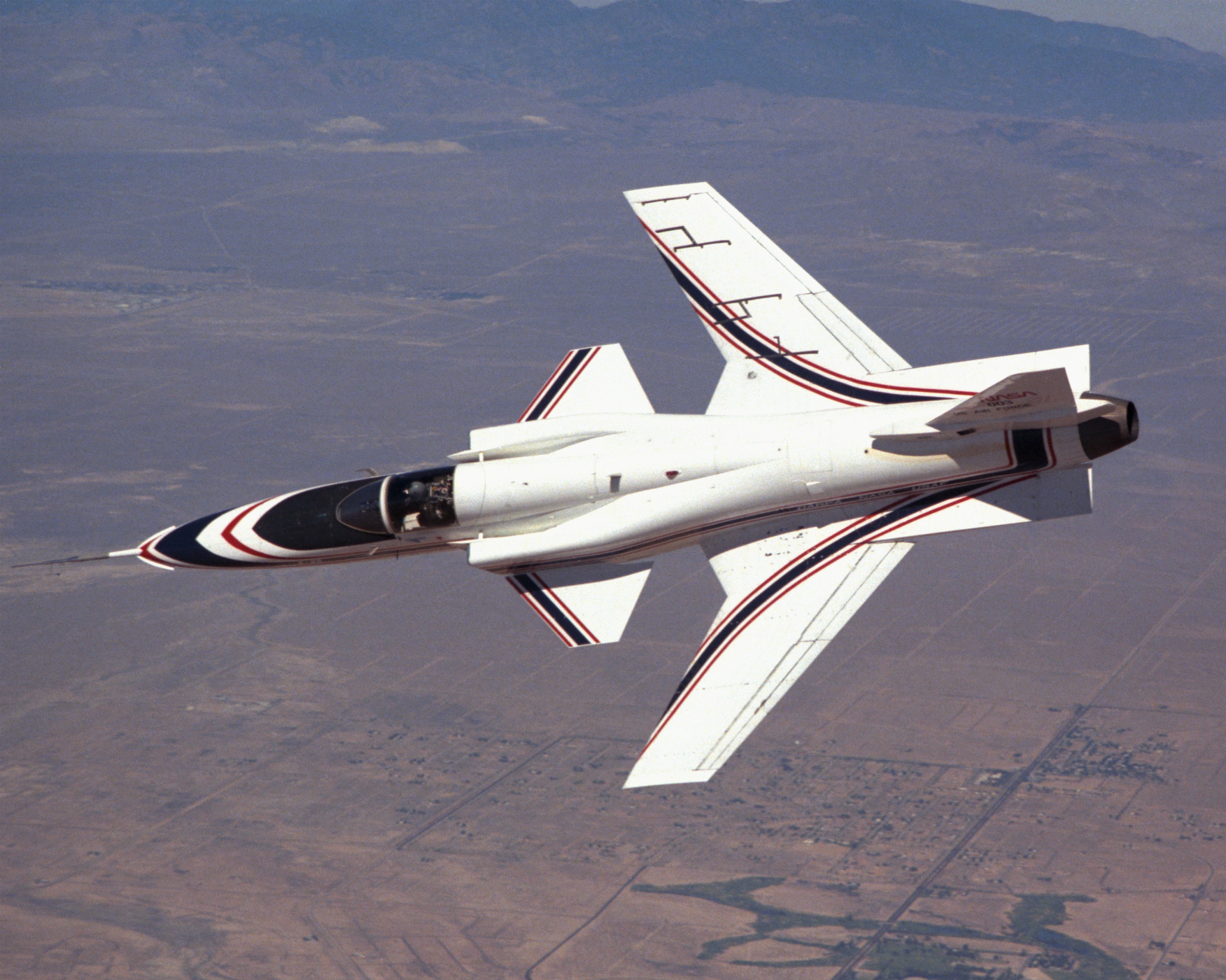
Grumman X-29 displaying forward-swept wing configuration

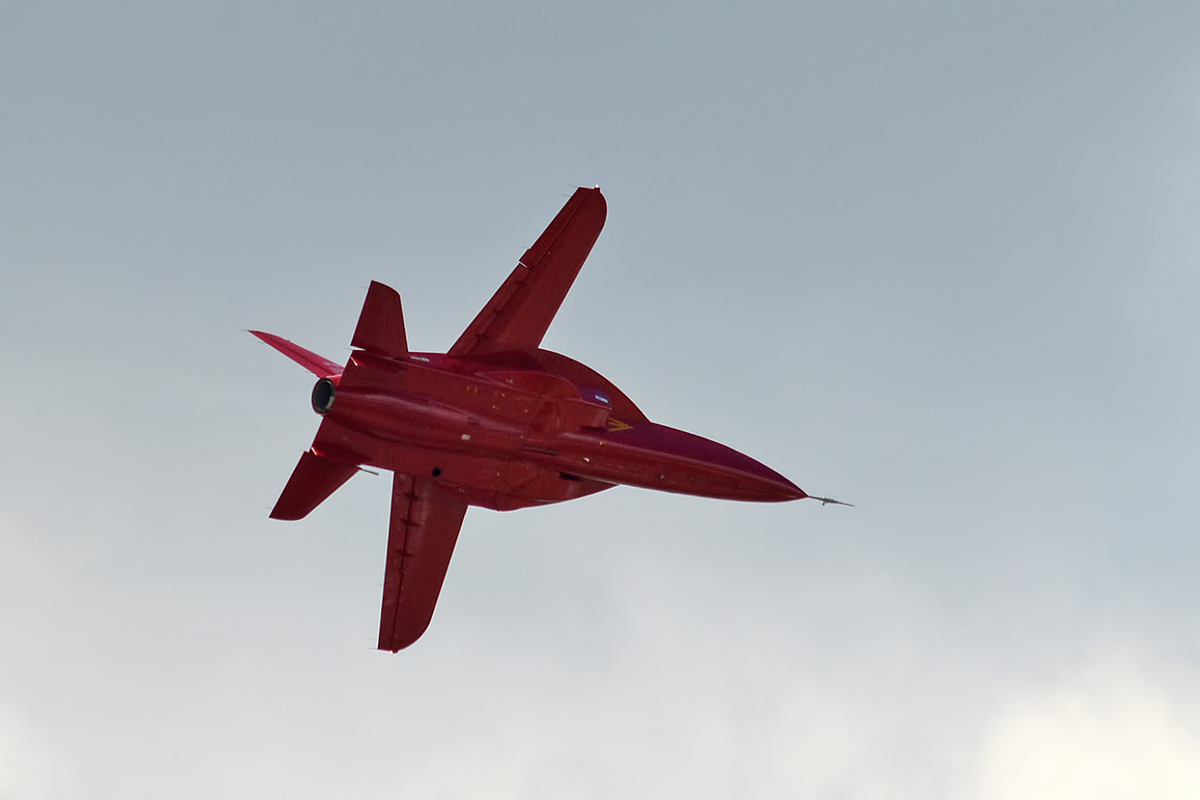
KB SAT SR-10 trainer

In the late 1970s, DARPA began investigating the use of composite materials to increase divergence speed through aeroelastic tailoring. Fly-by-wire technology allowed for the design to be dynamically unstable with improved maneuverability. Grumman built two X-29 technology demonstrators, first flying in 1984, with forward-swept wings and canards. The X-29 remained controllable at a 67° angle of attack.

Advances in thrust vectoring technology and a shift in aerial warfare tactics toward medium-range missile engagements decreased the relevance of forward-swept wing designs for fighter aircraft.

In 1997, Sukhoi introduced the Su-47 fighter prototype at the Paris Air Show. It did not enter series production, though it underwent a series of flight tests and performed at several air shows.

The KB SAT SR-10 is a prototype Russian single-engine jet trainer fitted with forward-swept wings. It first flew in 2015.

== In biology ==
Large-headed pterosaurs had forward-swept wings in order to maintain balance in flight.

== See also ==
- Sweep theory
- Variable-sweep wing
