= Junkers EF 132 =

Type of aircraft

Ju EF 132
- CG image of Junkers EF 132 in flight

General information
- Type: Bomber
- Manufacturer: Junkers
- Status: Incomplete
- Number built: 0 (One mockup was built)

History
- Developed from: Junkers Ju 287

The EF 132 was a planned jet bomber, under development for the Luftwaffe during World War II. It was the last aircraft project development undertaken by Junkers during the war, and was the culmination of the Ju 287 design started in 1942.

== Design ==
The shoulder-mounted wings were swept back 35° and featured a small amount of anhedral. Six Junkers Jumo 012 jet engines, each of which developed 24.5 kN (5,500 lbf) of thrust, were buried in the wing roots. Wind tunnel results showed the advantages of having the engines within the wing, rather than causing drag by being mounted below the wing surfaces. Several wooden mockups were built of the wing sections, in order to find the best way to mount the engines without wasting too much space while at the same time providing maintenance accessibility. The trailing edge flaps were designed to be split flaps, and the goal was to make the gearing and operation simple. Because of the high placement of the wings to the fuselage, an unbroken bomb bay of 12 m (39 ft 4 in) could be utilized in the center fuselage. The tailplanes were also swept back and the EF 132 had a normal vertical fin and rudder. An interesting landing gear arrangement was planned, that consisted of a nose wheel, two tandem main wheels beneath the center rear fuselage, and outrigger-type wheels under each outer wing. A fully glazed, pressurized cockpit located in the extreme fuselage nose held a crew of five. Armament consisted of two remotely-controlled twin 20 mm cannon turrets (one located aft of the cockpit, the other beneath the fuselage) and a tail barbette containing another pair of 20 mm cannons. All of this defensive armament was remotely controlled from the cockpit, and a bomb load of 4,000–5,000 kg (8,820–11,020 lb) was envisioned to be carried.

== Tests and outcome ==
A windtunnel model was tested in early 1945, and a full-scale wooden mockup was also built at the Dessau Junkers facility. The development stage had progressed far when the Red Army reached the Dessau complex and took possession of the Junkers Ju 287, EF 131 and EF 132 designs and components. In October, 1946 the whole complex and the German engineers were transferred to GOZ No.1 (Gosoodarstvenny Opytnyy Zavod, State Experimental Plant), at Dubna in the Soviet Union, to continue development of the EF 131 and EF 132. Design work on the EF 132 continued under Dr. Brunolf Baade at OKB-1 (the design bureau attached to GOZ No.1), under order of Council of Ministers directive No.874-266, an unpowered example was constructed to gather additional data, but only slow progress was made before the project was terminated on 12 June 1948, by CoM directive 2058-805.

== Specifications (EF 132, as designed) ==
General characteristics

- Crew: Five
- Length: 30.80 m (101 ft 1 in)
- Wingspan: 32.40 m (106 ft 4 in)
- Height: 8.40 m (27 ft 7 in)
- Wing area: 161 m^{2} (1,730 ft^{2})
- Empty weight: 31,300 kg (69,000 lb)
- Max takeoff weight: 65,000 kg (143,300 lb)
- Powerplant: 6× Junkers Jumo 012 turbojets, 24.5 kN (5,500 lbf) 24.5 kN each

Performance

- Maximum speed: 930 km/h (502 kn, 578 mph)
- Range: 3,500 km (1,900 nmi, 2,175 mi)
- Service ceiling: 10,300 m (33,792 ft)
- Rate of climb: 15.5 m/s (2,834 ft/min)

Armament

- Guns: 3 × 20 mm cannons each in remotely controlled dorsal, ventral and tail installations
- Bombs: 5,000 kg (11,023 lb) of bombs

== See also ==
Related development

- Junkers Ju 287
- OKB-1 150

Aircraft of comparable role, configuration, and era

- Boeing B-47 Stratojet

Related lists

- List of bomber aircraft
- List of German aircraft projects, 1939–45
- List of jet aircraft of World War II
- List of military aircraft of Germany
- List of World War II military aircraft of Germany
