= Cornelius XFG-1 =

American military fuel transporting towed glider

XFG-1
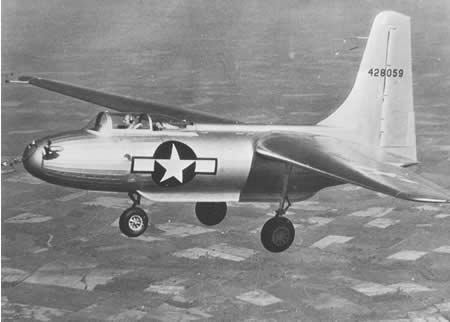

General information
- Type: Fuel tanker glider
- National origin: United States
- Manufacturer: Cornelius Aircraft Co.
- Designer: George Cornelius
- Primary user: United States Army Air Force
- Number built: 2

History
- First flight: 1944

The Cornelius XFG-1 was an American military fuel transporting towed glider, without a tailplane and with a forward-swept wing. Two were built but development ended in 1945.

== Design and development ==
The Cornelius XFG-1, developed under the project designation MX-416 was an aerodynamically unusual aircraft intended for an unusual military role. George Cornelius had been experimenting with aircraft featuring differentially variable incidence since the 1920s. His first two machines were otherwise conventional but the third, the Cornelius Mallard from 1943 was not, being without a horizontal tailplane and having low aspect ratio and strongly forward swept wings. Though very different in detail, the XFG-1 built on the Mallard experience. A 1/4 scale model of the XFG-1 was built for wind tunnel tests.

The FG in its designation stood for fuel glider and its role was as a fuel transport. It was to be towed behind another aircraft rather like contemporary troop carrying gliders, but its two fuselage tanks held 677 US gal (564 imp gal; 2,560 L) of avgas. Unlike other troop carrying gliders, e.g. Waco CG-4, the XFG-1 could be towed by modern bombers or transports at a cruise speed of 250 mph (220 kn; 400 km/h). Proposals seem to have included a piloted tow version behind a large transport, the glider landing loaded on skids having jettisoned its wheels after takeoff; or a pilot-less version towed behind a B-29 bomber, disconnected and abandoned after fuel transfer was completed; the intent of the scheme being for the glider to act, essentially, as a giant, winged drop tank for extending the range of the towing aircraft.

The XFG-1 was a high-wing monoplane, its wing set far back towards its vertical stabilizer. The wing was quite high aspect ratio and of modest forward sweep. Though the earlier Cornelius aircraft had wings that had their incidence variable in the air, the incidence on the XFG-1 could only be adjusted on the ground, with two settings of 3˚ and 7˚. There was no horizontal tail. It had a simple fixed tricycle undercarriage and a conventional single seat cockpit; two examples of the type were built.

== Operational history ==
Two prototypes were built (44-28059 and 44-28060) and 32 flights were made between them in 1944–45, although the first was lost to a spin, killing the pilot. On many of the flights, but not the fatal one, the pilot was Alfred Reitherman. The fuel glider concept was abandoned at the end of World War II.

== Specifications (XFG-1) ==
Data from , Fighting gliders of World War II

General characteristics

- Crew: 0/1
- Length: 29 ft 3 in (8.92 m)
- Wingspan: 54 ft (16 m)
- Wing area: 356 sq ft (33.1 m^{2})
- Empty weight: 3,362 lb (1,525 kg)
- Gross weight: 8,000 lb (3,629 kg)
- Fuel capacity: 677 US gal (564 imp gal; 2,560 L)

Performance
