= Millardair =

Canadian aviation company

IATA	ICAO	Call sign
—	MAB	Millardair
- Founded: 1963
- Ceased operations: 1990 (as an airline)
- Focus cities: Malton, Ontario (later Mississauga, Ontario)
- Headquarters: Toronto International Airport; Etobicoke, Ontario (as MRO)
- Key people: Carl Millard (1963–2006); Wayne Millard (2006–2012); Dellen Millard (2012–2013)

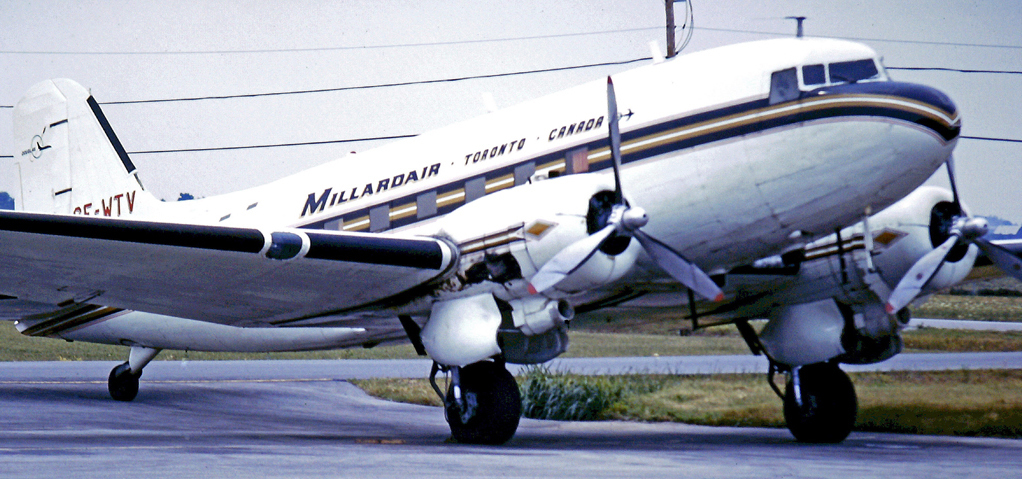
Millardair Douglas C-47A at Toronto's Malton airport in 1975

Millardair Ltd. was a Canadian airline that operated from 1963 until 1990 and from the 1990s to 2012 was an aircraft maintenance and servicing firm Millard Air Incorporated (Millardair MRO). Formerly based in Mississauga, Ontario, Millard Air moved their operations to Breslau, Ontario, in 2012 and ceased MRO activities after Wayne Millard's murder in December 2012.

== History ==
Millardair was founded in 1963 by aviator, Carl Millard (1913–2006) as Carl Millard and was based in Toronto, Ontario, Canada. Operations began using the Douglas DC-3. The main business was flying automotive parts and other cargo.

In 1970 the DC-3s were used to fly passengers on third-level services, and in 1972 the four-engine Douglas DC-4 joined the company's fleet. Some of the DC-3s were exchanged for Douglas C-117 Super Dakota, and operations continued until finding slots at Toronto airport became difficult and operations ceased due to bankruptcy on 31 May 1990. While no longer a flying operator, previously flown aircraft were stored at Pearson Airport along with other aircraft acquired.

Carl Millard died in 2006 and son Wayne Millard took over as President.

In 2012, after the company's lease expired at Toronto Pearson Airport, the company moved to Waterloo International Airport where it undertook a massive new hangar construction.

After Wayne Millard's death the role of CEO was taken up firstly, by his son, Dellen and subsequently by Wayne Millard's ex-wife Madeline Burns. The MillardAir MRO license was voluntarily cancelled in February 2013.

On May 10, 2013, Dellen was charged with the murder of Tim Bosma while attempting to steal Bosma's Dodge Ram 3500. He and his friend Mark Smich were convicted of first-degree murder on June 17, 2016. Millard and Smich were also convicted of first-degree murder in the death of Laura Babcock, Millard’s former girlfriend. Millard was convicted of murdering his father on September 24, 2018.

== Fleet details ==
- Douglas DC-3
- Douglas DC-4 Skymaster
- Douglas C-117 Super Dakota
- Piper PA-23
- Piper PA-30
- Piper PA-31
- Beechcraft Model 18
- Hansa Jet
- Cessna Citation I

== See also ==
- List of defunct airlines of Canada
