= Sukhoi Su-47 =

Experimental technology demonstrator

Su-47 Berkut
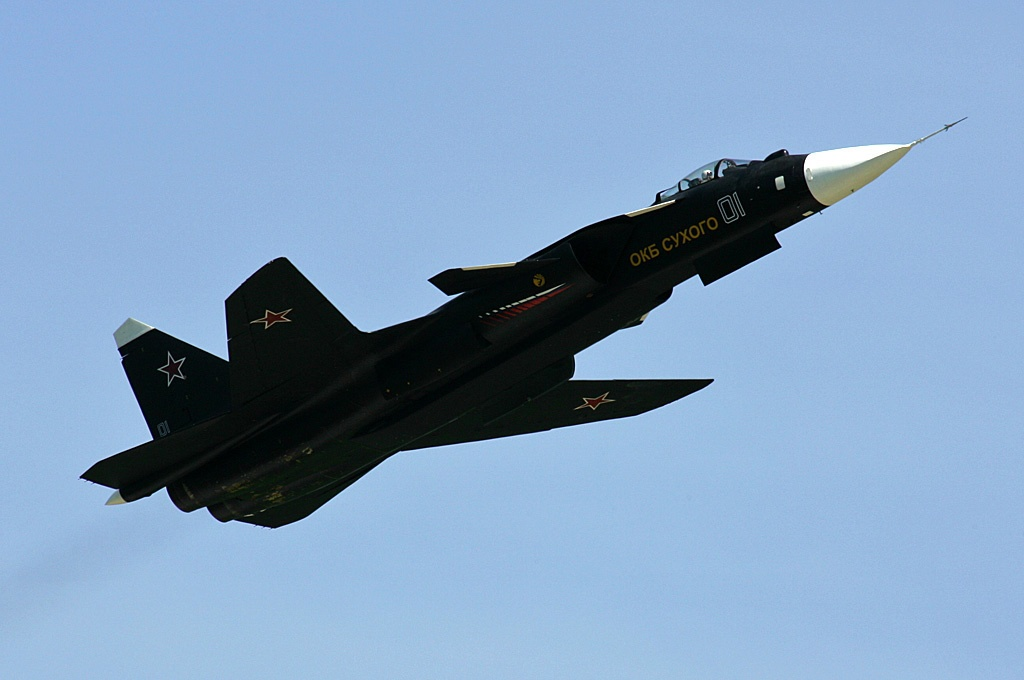
- The Su-47 at an airshow in June 2007

General information
- Type: Experimental aircraft/Technology demonstrator
- Manufacturer: Sukhoi
- Designer: Mikhail Pogosyan
- Status: Cancelled
- Primary user: Russian Air Force
- Number built: 1

History
- First flight: 25 September 1997; 29 years ago
- Developed from: Sukhoi Su-37

The Sukhoi Su-47 Berkut (Russian: Сухой Су-47 «Беркут», lit. 'Golden eagle', NATO: Firkin, designated S-32 and S-37 during initial development) is a Russian twin-engine, forward-swept wing, supersonic technology demonstrator developed by the JSC Sukhoi Company.

Powered by two Soloviev D-30 engines, the forward-sweep was intended to give the aircraft increased agility and maneuverability. While serial production of the type never materialized and the configuration was not further pursued, the sole aircraft produced served as a prototype for a number of technologies later used in Sukhoi's Su-35 fourth-generation fighter, and the Su-57 fifth-generation fighter.

The single model was first flown in 1997, and made regular appearances at Russia's MAKS air show until 2007, after which it made one appearance in 2019.

== Development ==
Originally known as the S-37, Sukhoi redesignated its advanced test aircraft as the Su-47 in 2002. Officially nicknamed Berkut (Russian: Беркут; the Kazakh word for "Eagle"), the Su-47 was originally built as Russia's principal testbed for composite materials and sophisticated fly-by-wire control systems, as well as new airframe technologies.

TsAGI has long been aware of the advantages of forward-swept wings, with research including the development of the Tsibin LL and study of the captured Junkers Ju 287 in the 1940s. At high angles of attack, the wing tips remain retracted allowing the aircraft to retain aileron control. Conversely to more conventional rear-swept wings, forward sweep geometrically creates increased angle of incidence of the outer wing sections when the wing bends under load. The wings experience higher bending moments, leading to a tendency for the wings to fail structurally at lower speeds than for a straight or aft-swept wing.

The project was launched in 1983 on order from the Soviet Air Force. However after the fall of the USSR, funding from the government was frozen and instead the project continued to be privately funded by Sukhoi. Like its US counterpart, the Grumman X-29, the Su-47 was primarily a technology demonstrator for future Russian fighters such as the Sukhoi Su-57. The forward-swept wing configuration was ultimately not pursued because it was mainly advantageous at transonic speeds while an aft-swept wing was superior at supersonic speeds.

Outline of the Sukhoi Su-47

The Su-47 is of similar dimensions to previous large Sukhoi fighters, such as the Su-35. To reduce development costs, the Su-47 borrowed the forward fuselage, vertical tails, and landing gear of the Su-27 family. Nonetheless, the aircraft includes an internal weapons bay, and space set aside for an advanced radar.

Like its immediate predecessor, the Su-37, the Su-47 is of tandem-triple layout, with canards ahead of wings and tailplanes. The Su-47 has two tailbooms of unequal length outboard of the exhaust nozzles, carrying rearward-facing radar and a breaker-chute.

=== Maneuverability ===
The Su-47 has extremely high agility at subsonic speeds, enabling the aircraft to alter its angle of attack and its flight path very quickly while retaining maneuverability in supersonic flight.

The forward-swept wings give the Su-47 an unconventional appearance. The inner portion of the wing generates a substantial part of the lift. This lift is not restricted by wingtip stall, and the lift-induced wingtip vortex generation is thus reduced. The aileron remain effective at the highest angles of attack, and controllability of the aircraft is retained even in the event of airflow separating from the remainder of the wings' surface.

A disadvantage of such a forward-swept wing design is that it twists when under load, resulting in greater stress on the wing than occurs with a similar straight or aft-swept wing. This requires the wing be designed to twist as it bends—opposite to the geometric twisting. This is done by the use of composite wing skins laid-up to twist. The aircraft was initially limited to Mach 1.6. Because the forward sweep was primarily beneficial at transonic speed while losing out to aft-swept wing at supersonic speed, it was not pursued further.

=== Thrust vectoring ===
The thrust vectoring (with PFU engine modification) of ±20° at 30°/second in pitch and yaw was intended to support the agility gained by other aspects of the design.

== Status since cancellation ==
The Su‑47 Berkut was last seen publicly in August 2019 at the MAKS‑2019 air show in Zhukovsky, Russia. This was its first appearance since MAKS‑2007, making it a rare and unexpected sighting.

== Specifications (Su-47) ==
Data from Jane's All the World's Aircraft 2000–01

General characteristics

- Crew: 1
- Length: 22.6 m (74 ft 2 in)
- Wingspan: 16.7 m (54 ft 9 in)
- Height: 6.4 m (21 ft 0 in)
- Wing area: 56 m^{2} (600 sq ft)
- Airfoil: 5%
- Gross weight: 25,670 kg (56,593 lb)
- Max takeoff weight: 34,000 kg (74,957 lb)
- Powerplant: 2 × Soloviev D-30F11 afterburning turbofan engines, 93.1 kN (20,900 lbf) thrust each engines with 2-dimensional and 3-dimensional thrust-vectoring nozzles planned for testing. dry, 153 kN (34,000 lbf) with afterburner

Performance

- Maximum speed: 2,200 km/h (1,400 mph, 1,200 kn) / M2.21 at altitude

1,400 km/h (870 mph; 760 kn) / M1.12 at sea level

- Range: 3,300 km (2,100 mi, 1,800 nmi)
- Service ceiling: 18,000 m (59,000 ft)
- g limits: +9
- Rate of climb: 233 m/s (45,900 ft/min)
- Wing loading: 607 kg/m^{2} (124 lb/sq ft) max (approx.)

458 kg/m^{2} (94 lb/sq ft) normal (approx.)

- Thrust/weight: 1.00 max take-off weight

1.29 normal take-off weight

Armament

- provision for conformal weapon storage

Avionics

- provision for mission radar in nose and ECM in tail radomes

== Gallery ==
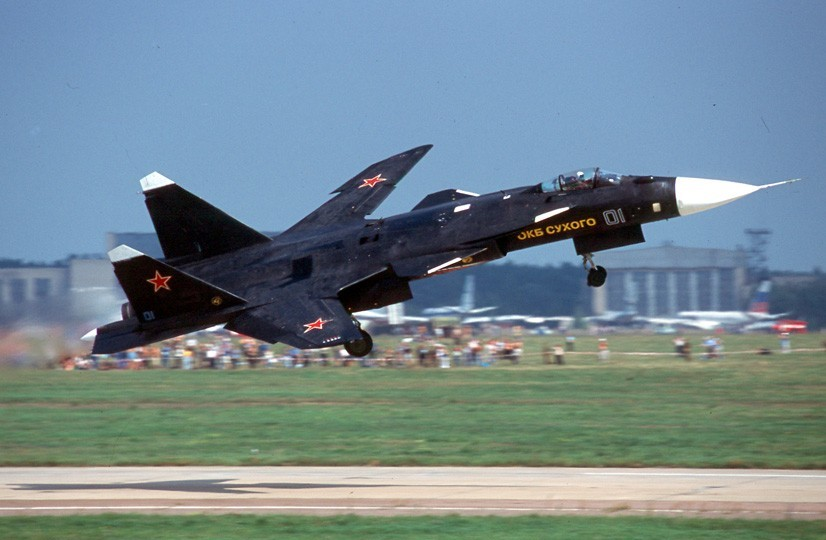
The Sukhoi Su-47 Berkut during MAKS airshow in 2001.

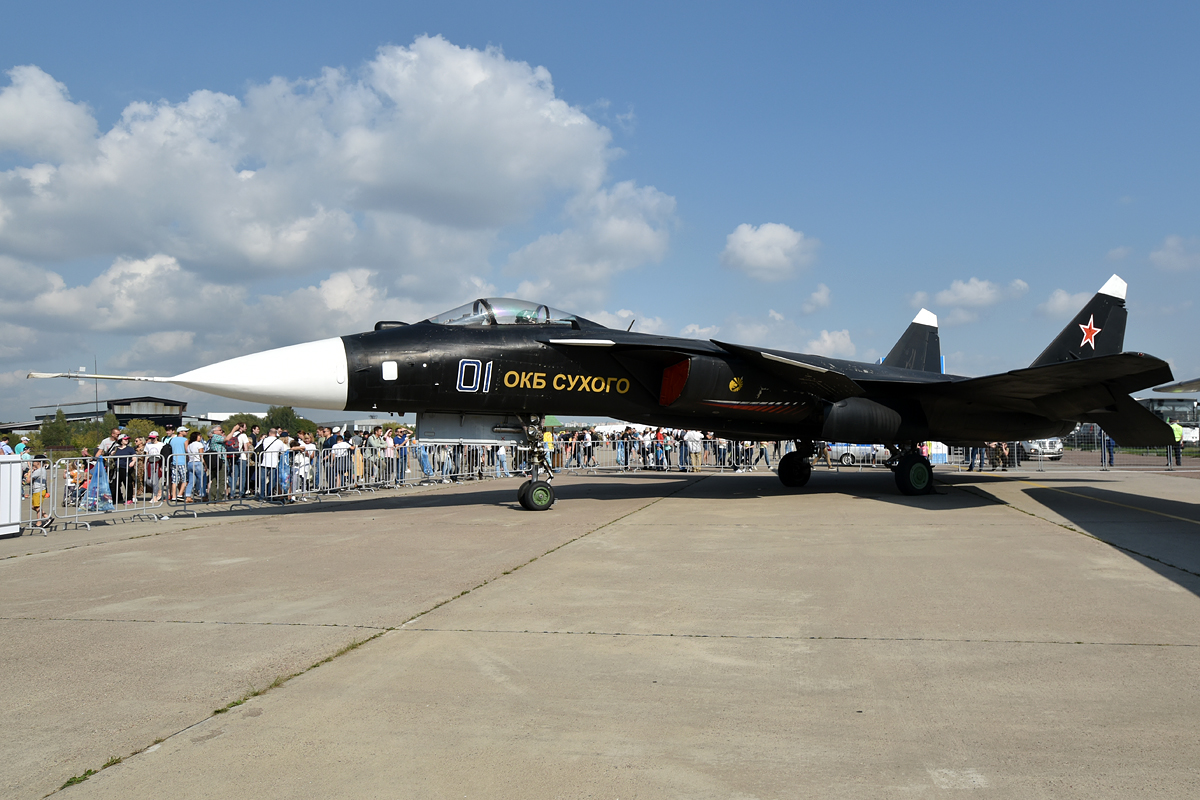
The Sukhoi Su-47 on the ground.

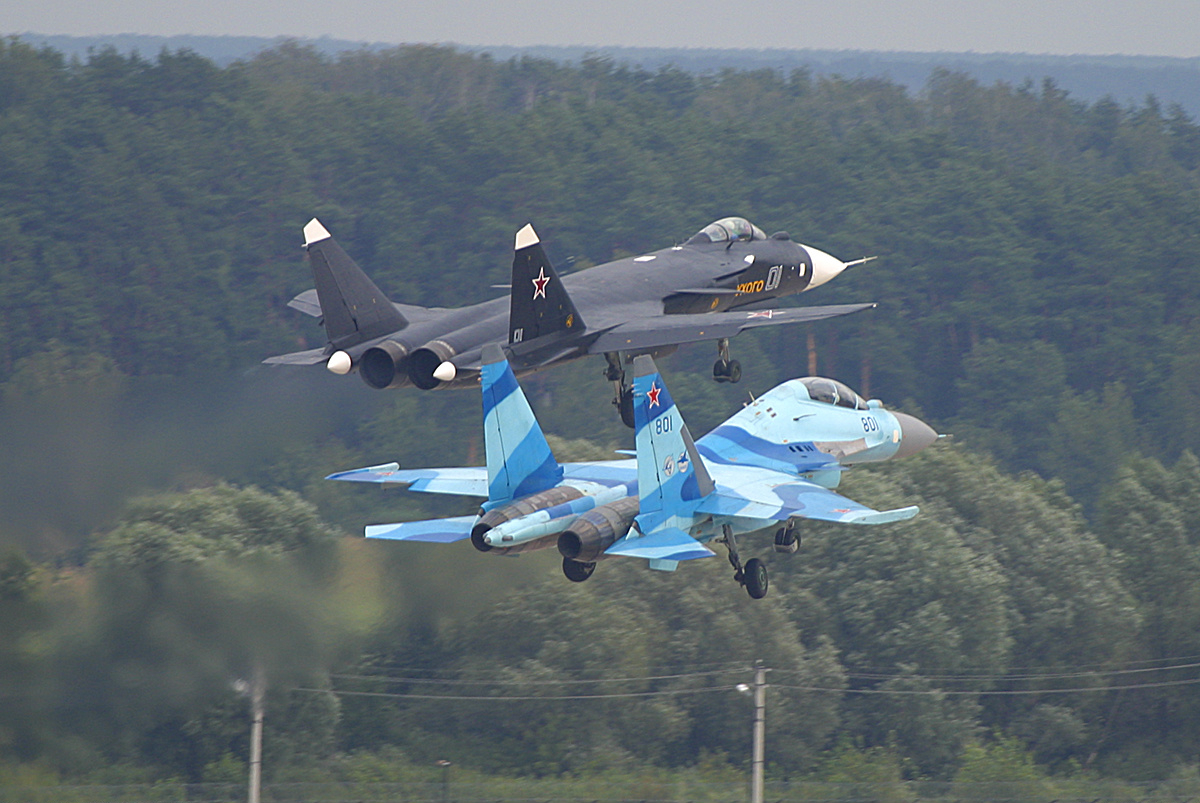
Su-47 next to a Sukhoi Su-35UB at the MAKS-2003 air show.

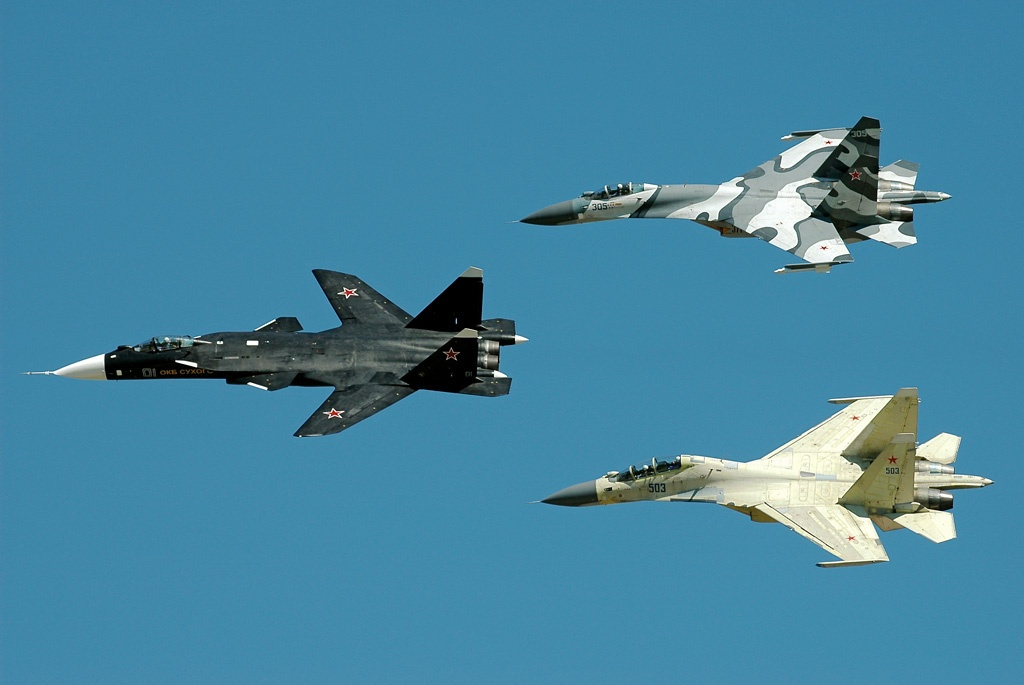
Sukhoi Su-47 Berkut in the lead, followed by a Su-27SKM (top) and a Su-30MKK (bottom).

== See also ==
Related development

- Sukhoi Su-27
- Sukhoi Su-30
- Sukhoi Su-33
- Sukhoi Su-34
- Sukhoi Su-35
- Sukhoi Su-37
- Sukhoi Su-57 / Sukhoi/HAL FGFA

Aircraft of comparable role, configuration, and era

- KB SAT SR-10
- Grumman X-29
- Mikoyan Project 1.44

== Bibliography ==
- Gordon, Yefim (2002). Sukhoi S-37 and Mikoyan MFI: Russian Fifth-Generation Fighter Demonstrators – Red Star Vol. 1. Midland Publishing. ISBN 978-1-85780-120-0.
- Tayor, Michael J. H. (1999). World Aircraft & Systems Directory. Herndon, VA: Brassey's. pp. 78–79.
