= Junkers Jumo 012 =

German turbojet engine

Jumo 109-012
- Type: Turbojet
- Manufacturer: Junkers
- Major applications: Junkers EF 132

The Junkers Jumo 109-012, known colloquially post-war as Jumo 012, was a turbojet engine under development in Germany during the Second World War. In essence, it was a scaled up version of the Jumo 004 (the Jumo 004 had already reached serial production by 1944). It was intended to power the EF 132 and variants of the Ju 287.

== Development ==
After the Jumo 004 had entered serial production, the Technical Department of the RLM requested Junkers to build a much larger engine capable of powering the heavy jet bombers then under development for the Luftwaffe. Initially, Junkers proposed modifications of the Jumo 004, specifically the 109-004G and 109-004H. However, these variants were rejected as they were not powerful enough, and Junkers began to design the 109-012.

The engine was to feature an 11-stage axial compressor enclosed in a sheet-steel casing and a 2-stage, air-cooled turbine. It was proposed that a bleed air system should be installed after the fifth compressor stage to supply compressed air, if needed. The RLM ordered ten pre-production examples of the 109-012 to be built at Dessau for testing, where several parts for the engines including nine exhaust cones were already completed. In December 1944, the RLM issued an order to Junkers calling for the firm to cease development on the 109-012, and further design work was moved to several other firms. By the end of the war, only one mock-up had been completed.

== Specifications ==
Data from

==== General characteristics ====
- Type: Turbojet
- Length: 4860 mm (191 in)
- Diameter: 1064 mm (42 in)
- Dry weight: 2000 kg (4,409 lb)

==== Components ====
- Compressor: 11-stage axial compressor
- Combustors: 8 chamber can-type
- Turbine: 2-stage

==== Performance ====
- Maximum thrust: 27.3 kN (2780 kgf / 6135 lbf)
- Thrust-to-weight ratio: 1.39

== In popular culture ==
An episode of The Antiques Roadshow filmed at Powis Castle in summer 2022 featured a blueprint of the Junkers 0-12.

== See also ==
Comparable engines

- Heinkel HeS 011

Related lists

- List of aircraft engines

== Bibliography ==
- Christopher, John (2013). The Race for Hitler's X-Planes: Britain's 1945 Mission to Capture Secret Luftwaffe Technology. Stroud, UK: History Press. ISBN 978-0-7524-6457-2.
- Gunston, Bill (2006). World Encyclopedia of Aero Engines: From the Pioneers to the Present Day (5th ed.). Stroud, UK: Sutton. ISBN 0-7509-4479-X.
- Kay, Anthony L. (2002). German Jet Engine and Gas Turbine Development 1930–1945. The Crowood Press. ISBN 1-84037-294-X.
- Kay, Antony (2004). Junkers Aircraft & Engines 1913–1945. London: Putnam Aeronautical Books. ISBN 0-85177-985-9.
- Kay, Anthony L. (2007). Turbojet History and Development 1930–1960. Vol. 1. Ramsbury: The Crowood Press. ISBN 978-1-86126-912-6.
