= Hans Wocke =

German airplane designer

Hans Wocke (born 2 August 1908 in Danzig, died 1991) was a German airplane designer. He was the chief developer of Junkers (JFM AG) during World War II. One of Wocke's major achievements was the development of the Junkers Ju 287 wing design since autumn 1942. Wocke was sent to Moscow in 1946 together with Brunolf Baade where he worked on the EF131 to EF150 projects. In 1954, Wocke returned to the German Democratic Republic, moving to West Germany shortly afterwards and joining Hamburger Flugzeugbau (HFB) to head up an engineering team. In Hamburg, Wocke completed work on the HFB 320 business jet, whose wings were forward swept, a design Wocke transferred from the Junkers Ju 287 in the early 1960s.
