= HFB 320 Hansa Jet =

Business jet

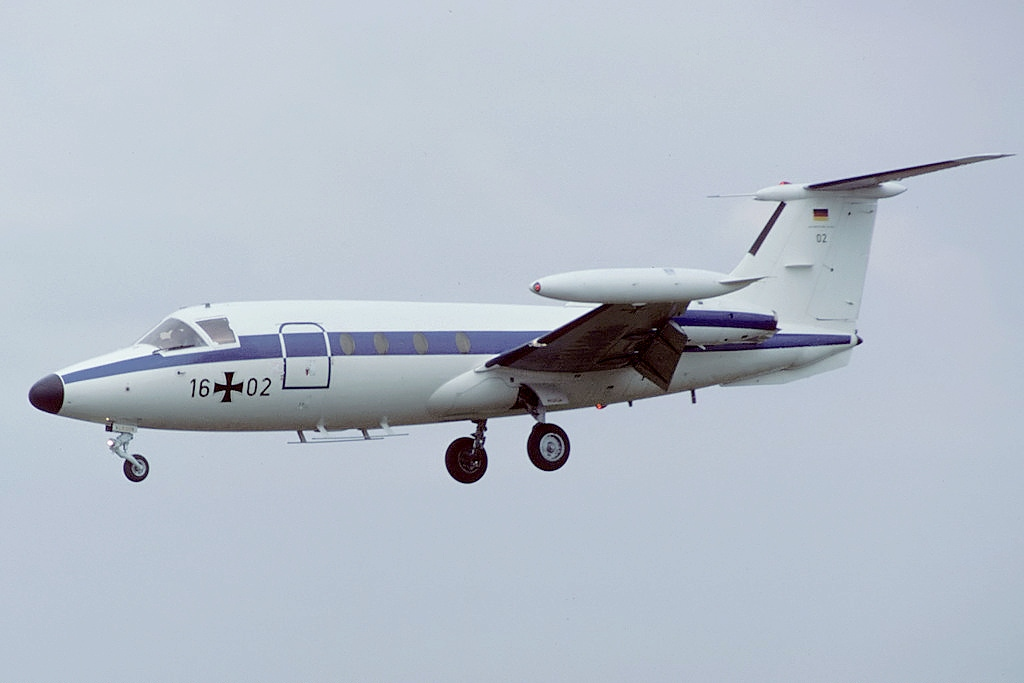
- The HFB-320, a business aircraft with twin aft-mounted turbojets

General information
- Type: Business jet
- National origin: Germany
- Manufacturer: Hamburger Flugzeugbau
- Status: Retired
- Primary user: West German Air Force
- Number built: 47

History
- First flight: 21 April 1964
- Retired: Military: 24 June 1994 Civilian: 30 November 2004

The HFB 320 Hansa Jet is a twin-engine, ten-seat business jet that was designed and produced by German aircraft manufacturer Hamburger Flugzeugbau between 1964 and 1973. The most recognisable and unconventional feature of the aircraft is its forward-swept wing.

The Hansa Jet began development during the 1960s, the selection of the forward-swept wing can be largely attributed to head engineer Hans Wocke, who had previously worked on the experimental Junkers Ju 287. It possessed a spacious cabin, which was achieved due to its wing design, but was a relatively heavy aircraft, posing some issues during both take-off and landing. On 21 April 1964, the prototype conducted its maiden flight. On 12 May 1965, the first prototype was lost during a test flight, killing Hamburger Flugzeugbau's chief test pilot; several design changes were made to change the Hansa Jet's stall characteristics.

Type certification of the Hansa Jet was received during early 1967 and the first deliveries commenced during the following year. The largest customer of the type was the German Air Force, who tasked it with both training and VIP transport duties. During 1973, it was decided to end production of the Hansa Jet. Reasons for the programme's termination include increased competition from newer executive jets, a decline in the value of the US dollar, and the limited sales of the type. The German Air Force continued to operate their Hansa Jets into the early 1990s. A limited number continued to be used amongst civilian operators into the 21st century.

== Development ==
=== Origins ===
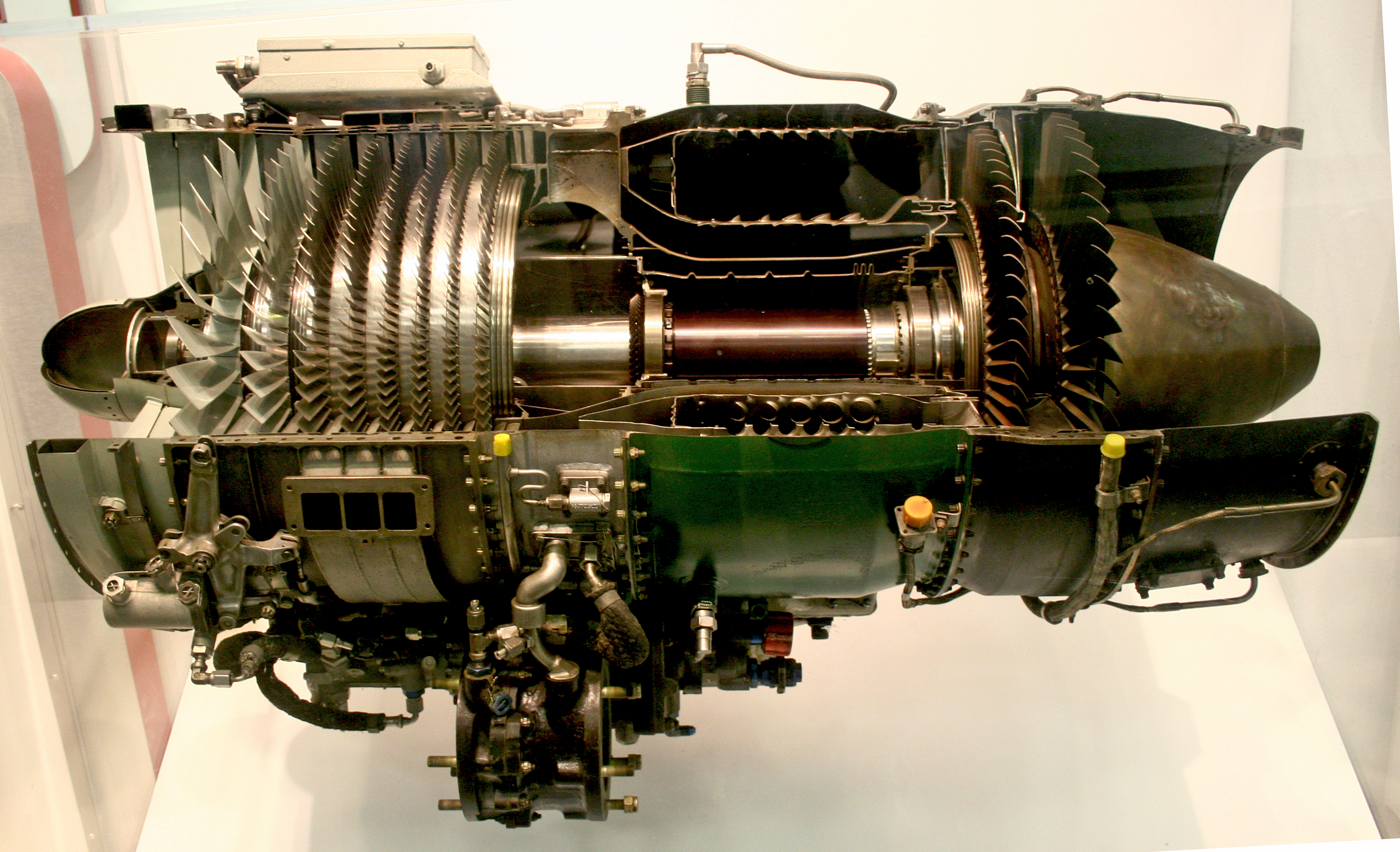
The selected General Electric CJ610 turbojet is derived from the military J85, pictured.

During the early 1960s, American businessman and inventor Bill Lear successfully launched the Learjet 23, one of the first light business jets. Several other manufacturers paid heed to this newly-found niche in the global aircraft market, one of these being the German aircraft manufacturer Hamburger Flugzeugbau. At this time, the company was reportedly keen to reassert its authority as a design agency and looking for a suitable commercially viable project in light of limited funding available from the West German government. Having identified the development of its own business jet as a suitable venture, Hamburger Flugzeugbau tasked its design team with producing an innovative small jet aircraft of its own.

The head of Hamburger Flugzeugbau's engineering team, German aeronautical engineer Hans Wocke, had previously designed the Junkers Ju 287, an experimental jet bomber of the Second World War which was the first aircraft to feature forward-swept wings. This experience strongly influenced the decision to adopt a forward-swept wing for the new design, which became known as the HFB 320 or the Hansa Jet. A more spacious cabin could be achieved than that of the Learjet, while remaining just as fast by minimising drag. The aircraft's aerodynamics were shaped by in excess of 2,000 hours of model-based testing performed in various wind tunnels at sites such as the Aerodynamische Versuchsanstalt in Göttingen, the Nationaal Lucht- en Ruimtevaartlaboratorium in Amsterdam, and Modane in France.

The selection of the American General Electric CJ610 turbojet engine to power the design was a straightforward choice; at the time, there were no other compact turbojets that had reached quantity manufacture yet. It provided some benefits, such as a relatively high thrust output, but was both noisy and fuel-hungry. Despite this power, the Hansa Jet required a runway length of roughly 5,900 feet, preventing it from using most smaller airports thus limiting its practicality. Possessing a maximum takeoff weight (MTOW) of 20,280-pounds, it was a relatively heavy aircraft compared with several competing business jets, such as the pre-existing Learjet 23 that had motivated the Hansa Jet's development.

While the German manufacturer would construct the majority of the airframe including the fuselage, engine pods and control system within its own factory, Hamburger Flugzeugbau formed partnerships with multiple other aircraft manufacturers, including Spain's CASA, Dutch Fokker and American Lockheed Corporation, which produced several other elements of the airframe abroad at their own facilities. On 18 March 1964, assembly of the first prototype Hansa Jet was completed; its use in a round of ground-based testing commenced immediately thereafter.

=== Into flight ===
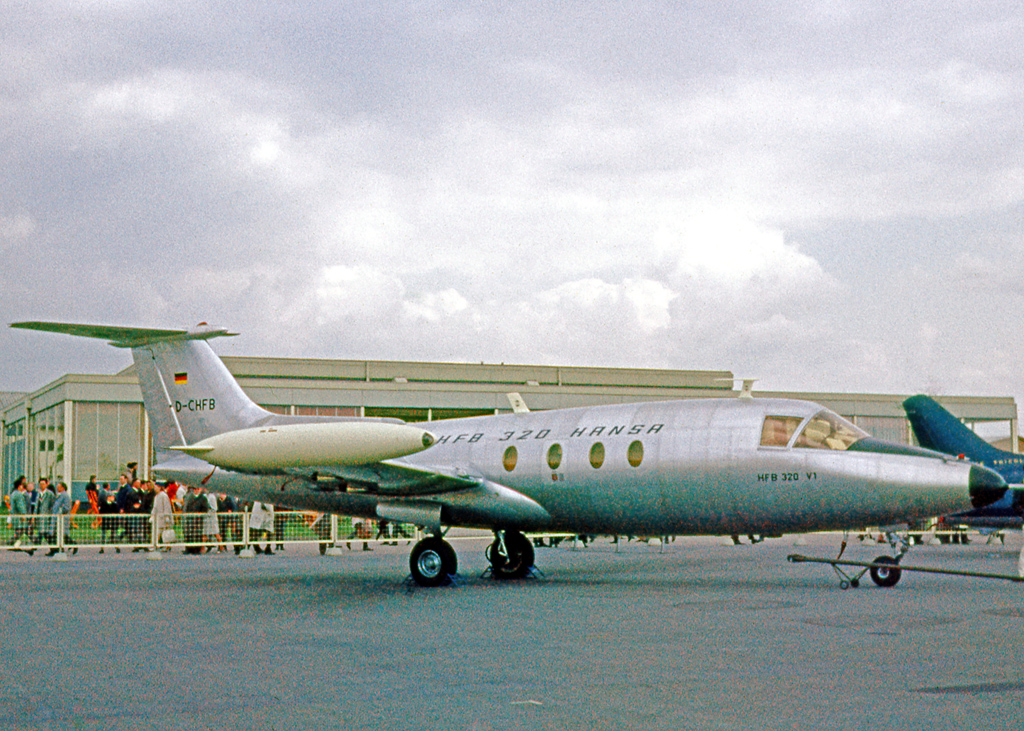
The prototype HFB 320 Hansa Jet displayed at the May 1964 Hanover Air Show

On 21 April 1964, the prototype conducted its maiden flight; during the following month, it was exhibited at the Hanover Air Show. A second prototype was flown on 19 October 1964. After a year of certification flight testing, on 12 May 1965, the first prototype crashed resulting in the death of Hamburger Flugzeugbau's chief test pilot; the cause was determined to have been the occurrence of an unrecoverable deep stall which had been induced by the design of the T-tail. As a consequence of the accident, various modifications were introduced to improve the aircraft's stall characteristics, including the installation of a stick pusher.

Assembly of the first ten production aircraft commenced during May 1965, the first of these reportedly flew on 2 February 1966. The granting of type certification by German authorities was achieved on 23 February 1967, certification from the American Federal Aviation Administration (FAA) followed on 7 April 1967. Deliveries commenced during the following year. According to aviation journalist Richard Collins, Hamburger Flugzeugbau's sales and service teams appeared to make only half-hearted efforts, which led to little customer interest in comparison to other business jets. In the long run, this inability to generate sales soon brought about the end of the programme.

Factors such as increased competition from newer executive jets and a comparatively poor safety record had contributed to dwindling orders during the late 1960s; during 1973, production of the type was ceased. According to EADS, the multinational successor company to Hamburger Flugzeugbau, the decision to terminate further development efforts involving the Hansa Jet had been attributed to the intense international competition from rival manufacturers, as well as a decline in value of the U.S. dollar during this period.

In 1969, the $840,000 HFB 320 was to be developed into the $1.7 million, Mach 0.76 HFB 330: flight-testing was to start in 1971 for FAR 25 certification by late 1972. It would have been stretched by 27.5 in (70 cm) and powered by Garrett ATF3 turbofans with thrust reversers for short-field operation. A 7,300 lb (3,300 kg) fuel capacity would have given it a maximum endurance of over seven hours and a transcontinental range of 2,000 miles (1,700 nmi; 3,200 km) with five people.

== Design ==
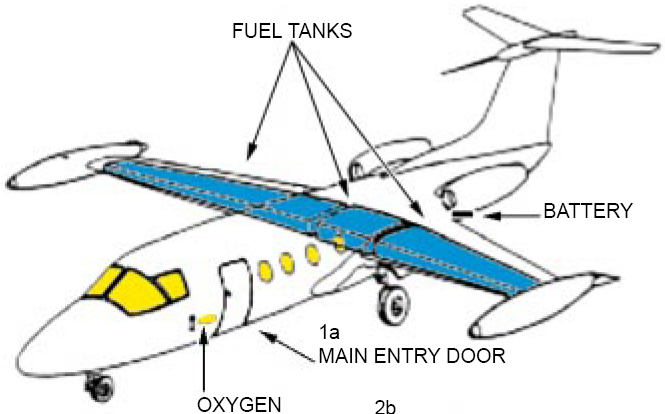
HFB 320 schematic

The HFB 320 Hansa Jet is a mid-wing monoplane of basically conventional layout, powered by twin rear-mounted jet engines beneath a T-tail. Constructed entirely of metal, it has a 10-seat passenger cabin and retractable undercarriage. As certified, the Hansa Jet can carry up to 12 passengers. Its General Electric CJ610 turbojet engines enabled the aircraft to achieve a maximum speed of 900 km/h (486 kn) along with a maximum endurance in excess of 2,200 km (1,200 nmi). The decision to mount these engines far aft contributed to the relatively quiet cabin.

An unusual feature of the Hansa Jet is its forward-swept wing, which is mid-mounted in the fuselage. This arrangement provided multiple benefits, not least maximising the aircraft's speed capabilities. It also allowed the main wing spar to pass through the fuselage behind the passenger cabin, thus leaving it unencumbered by carry-through spars or similar structural elements; this choice facilitated the adoption of a longer cabin with more seats while maintaining adequate headroom in the small-diameter fuselage. As of 2019, the HFB 320 remains the only civilian jet ever to have a forward-swept wing.

For added safety, the Hansa Jet was furnished with triple-redundant systems. It was also provisioned with a fully automated fuel system, having a 4,070 L (1,075 US gal) capacity distributed across multiple fuel tanks located in the fuselage, wing, and wing tips. Early aircraft were known to wear out their brakes at a high rate during landings; while a drogue parachute was made available as an option. The brake issue was later effectively addressed via the availability of more substantial brake units and the introduction of thrust reversers.

== Operational history ==
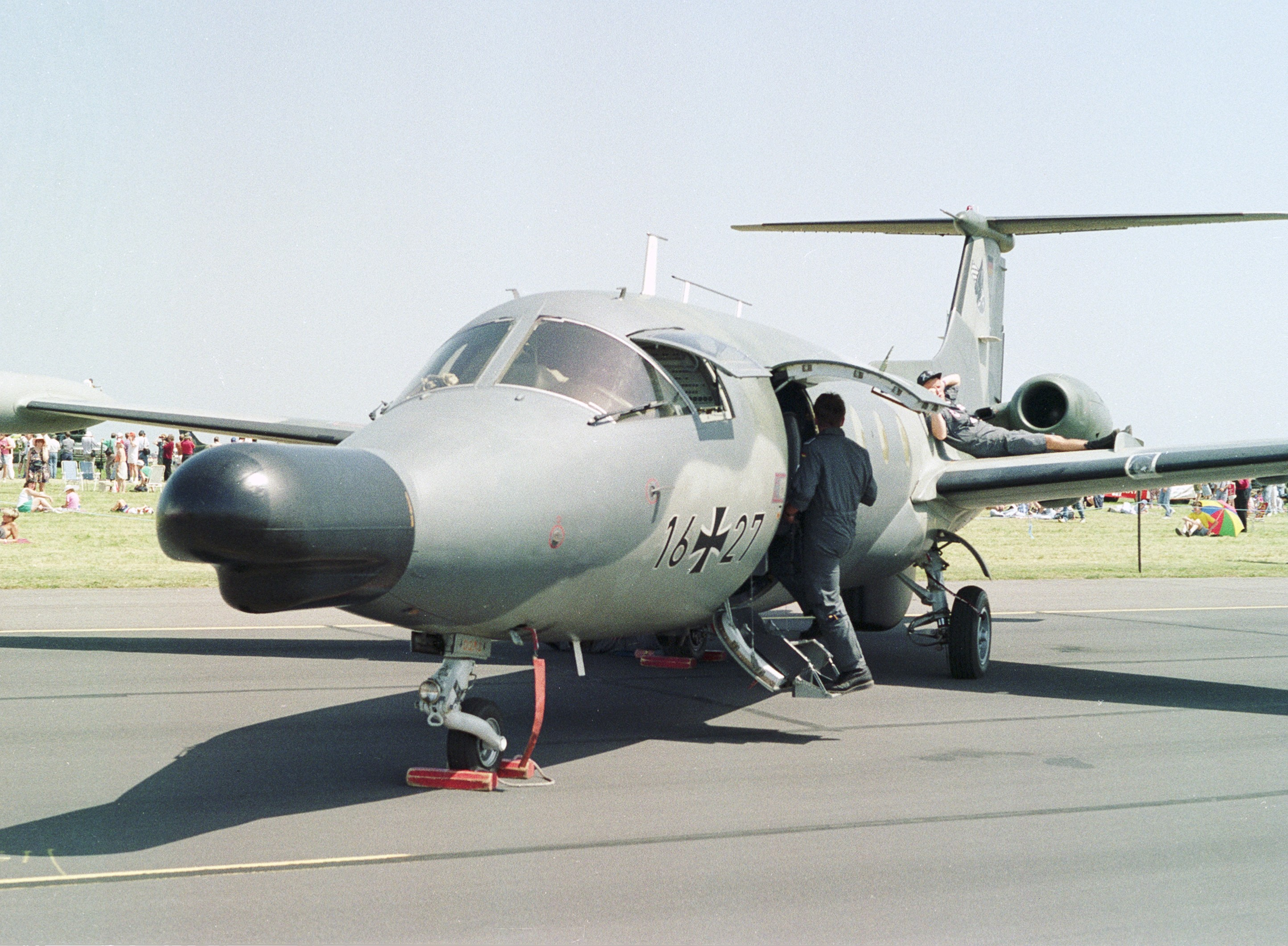
German Air Force HFB 320 ECM with nose radome and additional aerials

The first customer for the Hansa Jet was the Italian construction materials manufacturer Italcementi, which received the first delivery on 26 September 1967.

As part of the evaluation of the type, two preproduction aircraft were delivered to the ErpSt 61 test wing at Oberpfaffenhoffen in 1966. As a consequence of this evaluation, a total of six aircraft were ordered for VIP transport duties by the German Air Force; deliveries of these aircraft commenced during 1969.

Additionally, a further eight Hansa jets were purchased by the German Air Force for providing electronic countermeasure (ECM) training to air crews; these aircraft were delivered between August 1976 and April 1982. During 1985, the German Air Force decided to replace its Hansas with newer Canadair Challengers in the VIP role; the service's ECM aircraft remained operational until their withdrawal in 1994.

The Aviation Safety Network lists a total of nine accidents (six fatal) for the type, a 20 percent hull-loss rate; but only the crash of the prototype was directly attributable to the aircraft's design. Pilot error was blamed in a majority of the accidents. According to aviation publication "AIN Online", perhaps the last flying Hansa in the U.S. crashed on 30 November 2004. Because of the low number of airframes remaining, it became economically impractical to re-engine or install hush kits on the Hansa Jet's relatively-noisy CJ610 engines.

The APU is the Adolph Saurer GT15.

== Operator ==
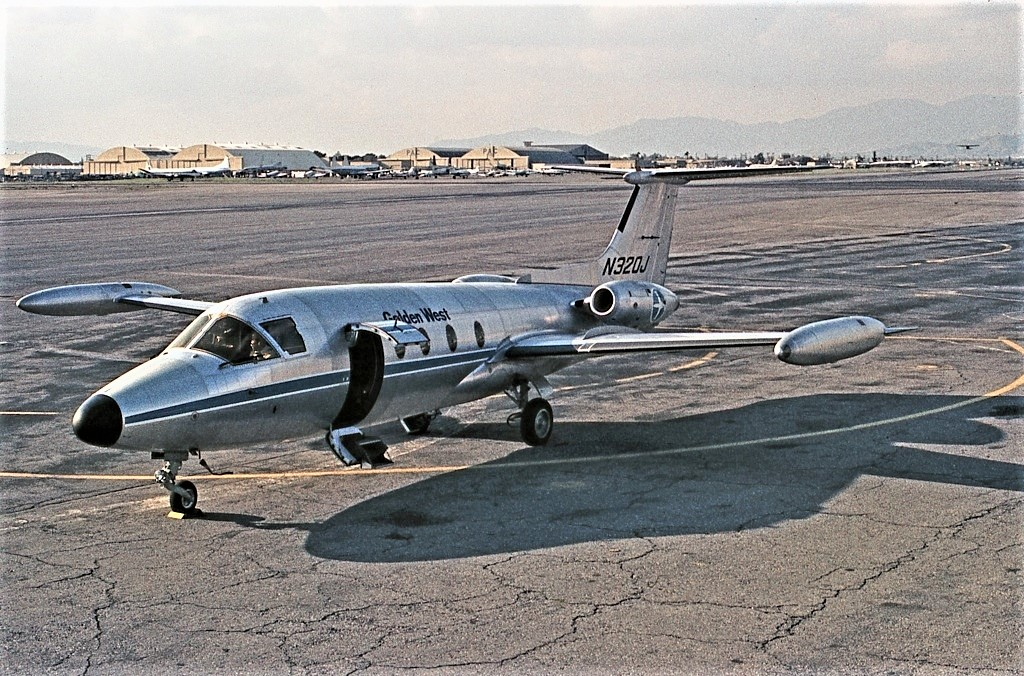
Golden West Airlines HFB-320

=== Civilian operators ===
Canada

- Millardair

Libya

- Libyan Arab Airlines

United States

- Golden West Airlines
- Grand Aire Express
- Jet Hansa Corporation
- Midwest Air Charter
- Modern Air Transport
- Zantop Airways

=== Military operators ===
West Germany

- West German Air Force

== Specifications (HFB 320) ==
Data from Jane's all the World's Aircraft 1973–74

General characteristics

- Crew: 2
- Capacity: 7, 11 or 15 passenger configurations / 1,814 kg (3,999 lb) payload in freighter versions
- Length: 16.61 m (54 ft 6 in)
- Wingspan: 14.49 m (47 ft 6 in) inc. tip-tanks
- Height: 4.94 m (16 ft 2 in)
- Wing area: 30.14 m^{2} (324.4 sq ft)
- Aspect ratio: 6
- Airfoil: root: NACA 65A(1.5)13; tip: NACA 63A(1.8)11
- Empty weight: 5,425 kg (11,960 lb)
- Max takeoff weight: 9,218 kg (20,322 lb)
- Fuel capacity: 4,140 L (1,094 US gal; 911 imp gal) usable fuel
- Powerplant: 2 × General Electric CJ610-9 turbojet aircraft, 14 kN (3,100 lbf) thrust each (Note: The first 15 production units used General Electric CJ610-1 engines; the next 20 units used the more powerful CJ610-5; subsequent units used the CJ610-9.)

Performance

- Cruise speed: 825 km/h (513 mph, 445 kn) max, at 7,620 m (25,000 ft) at 7,500 kg (16,535 lb)
- Economical cruise speed: 675 km/h (419 mph; 364 kn) at 10,670 m (35,000 ft) at 7,500 kg (16,535 lb)
- Stall speed: 198 km/h (123 mph, 107 kn) with take-off flap, 178 km/h (111 mph; 96 kn) in landing configuration
- Never exceed speed: 700 km/h (430 mph, 380 kn) EAS below 5,800 m (19,000 ft), M0.83 above 5,800 m (19,000 ft)
- Range: 2,370 km (1,470 mi, 1,280 nmi) with six passengers and baggage and 45 minutes fuel reserve
- Service ceiling: 12,000 m (40,000 ft) maximum operating altitude
- Rate of climb: 21.6 m/s (4,250 ft/min) at sea level at 7,500 kg (16,535 lb)
- Time to altitude: 7,600 m (24,900 ft) in 12 minutes
- Wing loading: 305 kg/m^{2} (62 lb/sq ft)
- FAA balanced field length at MTOW: 1,450 m (4,760 ft)
- FAA landing field length: 1,350 m (4,430 ft)

== See also ==
Aircraft of comparable role, configuration, and era

- British Aerospace 125
- Dassault Falcon 10
- IAI Westwind
- Learjet 25
- North American Sabreliner
- Piaggio PD.808

Related lists

- List of civil aircraft
