= Dellen Millard and Mark Smich =

Canadian murderers

- Born: Dellen Millard; August 30, 1985 (age 41); Toronto, Ontario, Canada Mark Smich; August 13, 1987 (age 39); Toronto, Ontario, Canada
- Conviction: First-degree murder
- Penalty: Life imprisonment with no possibility of parole for 25 years (both)

Details
- Victims: 3 (Millard), 2 (Smich)
- Span of crimes: c. July 2012 – May 6, 2013
- Country: Canada
- Date apprehended: May 11, 2013 (Millard), May 22, 2013 (Smich)

Dellen Millard (born August 30, 1985) and Mark Smich (born August 13, 1987) are two Canadian convicted murderers from Toronto, Ontario, who together murdered Laura Babcock and Tim Bosma in separate killings in July 2012 and May 2013 respectively. They were convicted of the murders in December 2017 and June 2016, respectively. Millard was also convicted individually of first-degree murder for the 2012 death of his father, Wayne Millard, which was initially deemed a suicide, but was later reinvestigated. The guilty verdict for that charge was delivered on September 24, 2018.

== Background ==
=== Dellen Millard ===
Dellen Millard was born on August 30, 1985, to Wayne Millard and Madeleine Burns. Wayne was a pilot who had worked at both Air Canada and Millardair, an aviation firm founded by his father, Carl. Burns was a flight attendant at Air Canada when they met. Millard grew up in Toronto, Ontario, the only child of his wealthy parents. In 1999, at age 14, Millard set a world record for the youngest person to fly both a helicopter and a fixed-wing plane solo on the same day.

Millard owned several properties in the Toronto area, including a $1.2 million home in Etobicoke, a $500,000 condominium in an unspecified location, a $2 million residential rental property, and a $850,000 hundred-acre farm in Ayr. In May 2013, he finalised the purchase of a $627,000 condo in Toronto's Distillery District.

=== Mark Smich ===
Smich was born on August 13, 1987. Unlike Millard's parents, Smich's parents were middle-class. He had a criminal record involving petty offences such as drug possession, driving impaired, mischief, failure to appear, and breach of conditions. Smich sold drugs and cigarettes for a living and occasionally worked odd jobs in Millard's hangar.

=== Millard and Smich's relationship ===
Millard and Smich were introduced around 2006. Friends described their friendship as initially one-sided: "Mark worshipped Dell, but Dell hated him". By 2011, they had grown closer, and in 2012 Smich and his girlfriend Marlena Meneses moved into the basement suite of the Millard family house. Around the same time, Millard began to arrange for Smich and other friends to accompany him on what he termed "missions": night-time excursions to steal items such as Bobcat construction equipment, lawnmowers, and even trees. A friend later described these "missions" as being strictly "for the thrill of it", as Millard had more than enough money to have purchased such things if he had wanted to.

== Murder of Tim Bosma ==
=== The night of the murder ===
32-year-old Tim Bosma was a Canadian from Ancaster, a community within the city of Hamilton, Ontario. Bosma had not previously known Millard or Smich. The pair contacted Bosma by phone to arrange a test drive of a pickup truck he had been selling online on Kijiji. Millard and Smich arrived on foot for the test drive just after 9:20 pm on May 6, 2013, telling Bosma's wife Sharlene they had been dropped off by a friend. Bosma told his wife he would be right back, but none of the three men returned. After several hours, Sharlene contacted police to report her husband missing.

During the test drive, Bosma was shot and killed. It is unclear whether it was Smich or Millard who ultimately pulled the trigger. Bosma's body was incinerated that night at the Millard hangar.

=== Investigation ===
The Hamilton Police Service treated the Bosma case as "a missing persons investigation with unusual circumstances". They conducted a ground search of the area around Bosma's home with the assistance of a canine unit and local search and rescue, and held a press briefing on May 7. Police quickly discovered that the phone used to contact Bosma had been a burner phone. On May 9, Bosma's deactivated cell phone was found in an industrial area on the west side of nearby Brantford.

Using the call records from the burner phone, police discovered that the men had arranged two other test drives in similar vehicles in the days preceding Bosma's murder. The two failed to arrive on time for the first, so it never occurred. The pair took the second vehicle on a test drive in Toronto on May 5. The men from that test drive matched the descriptions of the pair who had left with Bosma. One of the men carried a small satchel bag and had a tattoo on his wrist of the word "ambition" inside a box, a detail the police released to the public hoping for an identification.

On May 10, police from Peel and Toronto advised the Hamilton police about a Toronto man named Dellen Millard, who was known to carry a satchel bag and had an "ambition" tattoo on his wrist. On May 11, Dellen Millard was arrested. On May 12, Bosma's truck was found inside a trailer in the driveway of Millard's mother's home. The trailer was registered to Millardair.

Police publicly confirmed that Bosma was deceased on May 14. Burned remains believed to be Bosma's had been located inside the incinerator, which had been found at Millard's farm in Ayr.

Following approximately a week of surveillance, Smich was arrested on May 22.

=== Trial ===
At trial, Smich, Millard, and the Crown all presented different theories of what happened on the night of Bosma's murder. Smich and Millard each attempted to blame the other for the shooting.

Smich contended that he was actually in a separate vehicle following behind Bosma and Millard, testifying that Millard shot Bosma while they were together in Bosma's truck. Millard's lawyer, Nadir Sachak, argued that all three men were in Bosma's vehicle, with Millard driving, Bosma in the front passenger seat, and Smich in the back seat behind him. According to this version, during the ride, Smich pulled out a gun and told Bosma they intended to steal the vehicle. A struggle ensued and Bosma was shot by accident. Millard did not testify during the trial, but has repeated this version of events in interviews since. Smich strongly denied this version of events at trial.

The Crown contended that both Smich and Millard were in the vehicle and participated in the killing. The Crown never definitively proved which of the men fired the gun. As long as both had participated in the planning and execution of the crime, both could be charged with first-degree murder regardless of who actually pulled the trigger. On June 17, 2016, the two men were convicted of first-degree murder in Bosma's killing and were sentenced to life imprisonment, with no parole eligibility for 25 years.

== Murder of Laura Babcock ==
In December 2017, Millard and Smich were convicted of the murder of Laura Babcock, who was last seen alive in July 2012. Her remains have never been recovered. Millard and Smich were again sentenced to life in prison, with the parole ineligibility period of 25 years to be served consecutively with that of the previous sentence, meaning they are to serve a minimum of 50 years and will not be released prior to 2063.

== Murder of Wayne Millard ==
On November 29, 2012, Millard's father, Wayne Millard, was found dead with a gunshot through the left eye. His death was initially ruled as a suicide. It was later discovered that father and son had disagreements over the family business. After the murders of Bosma and Babcock, police reviewed Wayne Milliard's death, and Dellen was charged individually with his murder.

=== Trial ===
During this trial by judge alone, which started in June 2018, Millard did not testify; his lawyer insisted that his father's death was by suicide and that the Crown did not prove any motive. Evidence presented by the Crown included the fact that Millard had purchased the gun which had killed his father, and the fact that Millard's cell phone had been at his father's home around 1:00 a.m. that night, where it stayed until shortly after 6:00 a.m.

On September 24, 2018, Millard was found guilty of first-degree murder in the death of his father Wayne Millard. The 90-minute reading of Justice Maureen Forestell's finding included this statement: "I am satisfied that Dellen Millard killed his father by shooting him in the left eye as he slept. I can find no theory consistent with innocence". On December 18, 2018, Millard was sentenced to life in prison for a third time, again with no parole eligibility for 25 years. The latest sentence was to be served consecutively along with the other life sentences handed down in the Bosma and Babcock murders. This meant Millard would be required to serve a minimum of 75 years before becoming eligible for parole, first able to apply in the year 2088 at age 103. However, a 2022 ruling of the Supreme Court changed that, as explained below.

=== Conviction of Matthew Ward-Jackson ===
On 12 January 2018, Matthew Ward-Jackson (born 1987), an acquaintance of Millard, was sentenced to eleven years of imprisonment after pleading guilty to nine charges relating to gun possession and trafficking. Among the charges were the sale of a .32 calibre Smith & Wesson revolver to Millard that he used to kill his father and the sale of a Walther PPK that was used in the murder of Bosma. As Ward-Jackson was already incarcerated for a different conviction at the time of the new sentence, credits were applied to his sentence and his final additional sentence was three years, seven months and two weeks.

== Aftermath and appeals ==
In 2021, Millard was involved in a fight at Millhaven Institution, in which he restrained a man while another inmate stabbed him. The victim survived, and Millard and the other man were charged with assault causing bodily harm and weapons possession. His co-accused pled guilty, but Millard pled not guilty. His weapons charge was dropped for lack of evidence, but he was convicted of the assault charge in March 2023.

Millard and Smich have appealed their convictions for the murders of Tim Bosma and Laura Babcock. As of June 15, 2023, this appeal was rejected. Millard separately appealed his conviction for the murder of his father; the appeal was rejected in March 2023, with the higher court affirming the conviction was correct. Their appeals of the convictions for the Babcock and Bosma murders were rejected in June 2023. Smich's lawyer said he intended to request leave to appeal to the Supreme Court.

The Supreme Court of Canada's 2022 R. v. Bissonnette decision struck down consecutive parole ineligibility periods as unconstitutional. Millard and Smich's respective 75- and 50-year ineligibility periods have been reduced to no more than 25 years of parole ineligibility. They will be eligible for parole in 2043.

== See also ==
- List of serial killers by country

== Bibliography ==
- Brocklehurst, Ann (2016). Dark Ambition: the Shocking Crime of Dellen Millard. Toronto: Viking. ISBN 9780670070145. OCLC 945719170.
- Carter, Adam (June 17, 2016). "Wayward Son". CBC News.
- Carter, Adam (June 17, 2016). "Tim Bosma trial: Millard and Smich guilty of 1st-degree murder". CBC News.
- "Tim Bosma case". The Hamilton Spectator. June 17, 2016.
