= Cornelius Mallard =

Single-engined light aircraft of very unusual configuration

Mallard
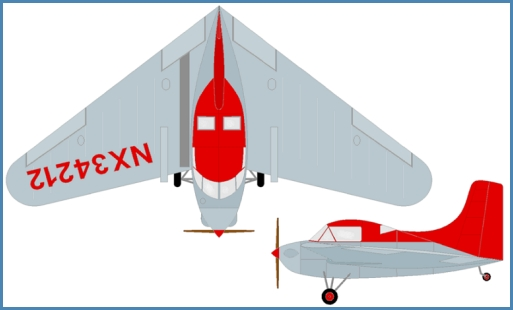

General information
- Type: two-seat light aircraft
- National origin: U.S.A
- Manufacturer: Cornelius Aircraft Co.
- Designer: George Cornelius
- Number built: 1

History
- First flight: 18 August 1943

The Cornelius Mallard was a single-engined light aircraft of very unusual configuration, tailless and with a swept forward wing of variable incidence. It flew between 1943-4.

== Design and development ==
The Mallard was the third aircraft type produced by Cornelius Aircraft. The first two, the FreWing and the LW-1 were conventional in layout but unusual in using independently variable incidence wings for pitch and roll control. The wings of the Mallard could also be adjusted in the air, but they were of low aspect ratio with marked forward sweep. The trailing edge carried conventional ailerons near the tips and elevators close to the fuselage. The Mallard was also a tailless aircraft, in the sense of lacking a horizontal tailplane. The rest of the aircraft was conventional, with single fin and rudder and a side-by-side cockpit for two behind a flat four engine. The undercarriage was fixed and of the tailwheel type. Like other Cornelius designs, the sole Mallard was built by the Spartan Aircraft Company.

The Mallard first flew on 18 August 1943, flown by Arthur Reitherman, though some sources suggest that most of the subsequent 18 flights were in the hands of the Romanian aerobatic pilot Alexander Papana. The first public flight was on 7 September 1943. It was reported to have been 700 lb (320 kg) overweight and there were plans to install a more powerful engine. The designer claimed that the Mallard was stall and spin proof, though the later loss of the much larger but similarly configured Cornelius XFG-1 in an irrecoverable spin has cast doubt on this.

== Specifications ==
Data from

General characteristics

- Crew: 1
- Wingspan: 38 ft 0 in (11.58 m)
- Gross weight: 2,470 lb (1,840 kg)
- Powerplant: 1 × Engine , 130 hp (97 kW)

Performance

- Cruise speed: 125 mph (200 km/h, 109 kn)
