= OKB-1 140 =

1947 USSR jet bomber

General information
- Type: Jet Bomber
- National origin: USSR
- Manufacturer: GOZ-1
- Designer: Brunolf Baade
- Number built: 2

History
- First flight: 30 September 1948
- Developed from: OKB-1 EF 131

The OKB-1 '140', (sometimes known as '001') was a jet bomber produced in the USSR from 1947.

== Development ==
The '140' was a reconnaissance/bomber aircraft, derived from the OKB-1 EF 131 with Soviet turbojet engines. The initial version, a tactical jet bomber with a secondary reconnaissance role, was initiated as the EF-140 by Dr. Brunolf Baade, at OKB-1, in 1947. The six Jumo 004 engines of the EF-131 were replaced by two Mikulin AM-TKRD-01 axial flow turbojets, rated at 32.372 kN (7,280 lb) thrust, in large nacelles attached to the underside of the wing at the same position.

Using the airframe of the second EF-131 prototype, the '140' was very similar in appearance, and to its forebear Junkers Ju 287, with the classic Junkers-style crew compartment in the nose, wings swept forward 19°50' with marked dihedral, and the underslung engine nacelles extending forward of the leading-edge. Construction was of aluminium alloy stressed skin, with a semi-monocoque fuselage, wings with multiple spars covered with stressed skin panels, and high strength steel for highly stressed parts. Defensive armament consisted of VDB-6 dorsal and NDB-1M ventral remotely controlled turrets controlled by the gunner, in the rear of the crew compartment, using upper and lower periscopes.

The prototype was completed quickly and ready for flight tests by late September 1948 after being disassembled and transported to Tyoply Stan airfield on the outskirts of Moscow. The first flight took place on 30 September 1948, but early test flights were disrupted by severe problems with the fuel control units of the AM-TKRD-01 engines. A replacement set was fitted and testing continued until the manufacturer's tests were completed on 24 May 1949.

Council of Ministers directive No. 1886-696 called for development of 140 as a tactical reconnaissance aircraft powered by two Klimov VK-1 centrifugal flow turbo-jets. During the design work for the '140-R' the deficiencies highlighted by flight testing of the '140' were addressed as well as the addition of wingtip-mounted fuel tanks and new nacelles for the VK-1 engines, and the fitting of DT-V1 and DT-N1 turrets, replacing those of the '140', armed with 2 × 23mm cannon each. Flight testing of '140-R' commenced on 20 October at a specially built airfield near the GOZ-1 factory at Borki, (the German workers were not admitted to Tyoplyy Stan for security reasons), where four flights were carried out, all of which suffered from severe vibration of the wings.

The final variant of '140' was the '140-B/R', which was a reconnaissance bomber, powered by the same engines but with increased weight and reduced performance. Design work, static tests and construction were complete and ground testing of the aircraft partially completed when all work on '140-R' and '140-B/R' aircraft was terminated by the Council of Ministers' directive No. 2474-974 issued on 18 June 1950.

== Variants ==
140
The initial prototype tactical jet bomber utilising the airframe of the second EF-131 with two Mikulin AM-TKRD-01 turbojet engines.
140-R
Converted from '140', the '140-R' was a reconnaissance aircraft powered by Klimov VK-1 engines and various improvements highlighted by flight testing of '140'.
140-B/R
A second '140 airframe, completed as a reconnaissance-bomber, which had partially completed ground tests, prior to flight testing, when the programme was cancelled.

== Specifications ('140-R') ==
Data from Early Soviet Jet Bombers

General characteristics

- Crew: 4
- Length: 19.25 m (63 ft 2 in)
- Wingspan: 21.87 m (71 ft 9 in)
- Height: 5.65 m (18 ft 6 in)
- Wing area: 61 m^{2} (660 sq ft)
- Empty weight: 14,676 kg (32,355 lb)
- Gross weight: 25,543 kg (56,313 lb)
- Powerplant: 2 × Mikulin AM-TKRD-01 turbojet engines, 26.487 kN (5,955 lbf) thrust each

Performance

- Maximum speed: 837 km/h (520 mph, 452 kn)
- Range: 3,600 km (2,200 mi, 1,900 nmi)
- Service ceiling: 14,100 m (46,300 ft)

Armament

- 2 × 23 mm (0.906 in) cannon in a DT-V1 dorsal barbette.
- 2 × 23 mm (0.906 in) cannon in a DT-N1 ventral barbette
- 8 × 100 kg (220 lb) SAB-100/75 high explosive bombs.
- or 8 × 100 kg (220 lb) SAB-100/55 high explosive bombs.
- or 12 × 50 kg (110 lb) FOTAB-50/35 flare bombs

== See also ==
Related development

- OKB-1 EF 131

Aircraft of comparable role, configuration, and era

- English Electric Canberra
