= Aeroelastic tailoring =

Aeroelastic tailoring is defined as "the embodiment of directional stiffness into an aircraft structural design to control aeroelastic deformation, static or dynamic, in such a fashion as to affect the aerodynamic and structural performance of that aircraft in a beneficial way", or "passive aeroelastic control". Objectives associated with aeroelastic tailoring include weight minimization, flutter, divergence, stress, roll reversal, control effectiveness, lift, drag, skin buckling, and fatigue.

== History ==
According to Shirk et al., the first record of aeroelastic tailoring is from 1949 by Munk, who oriented the grain of his wooden propeller blade to create desirable deformation couplings when operated. In the late 1960s, there was a thrust in aeroelastic tailoring research, which has continued fairly steadily through to today. The forward swept wings of the X-29 and the Active Aeroelastic Wing are two aeroelastic tailoring examples highlighted by Weisshaar. Today the use of composite materials is becoming more prevalent in transport aircraft, including the Boeing 787, the Airbus A380, and the upcoming Airbus A350. Enhanced fabrication processes for composite laminates offer new design possibilities that have not been fully exploited for optimal aeroelastic performance and weight savings.
