= Junkers Ju 287 =

Prototype German jet bomber

Ju 287
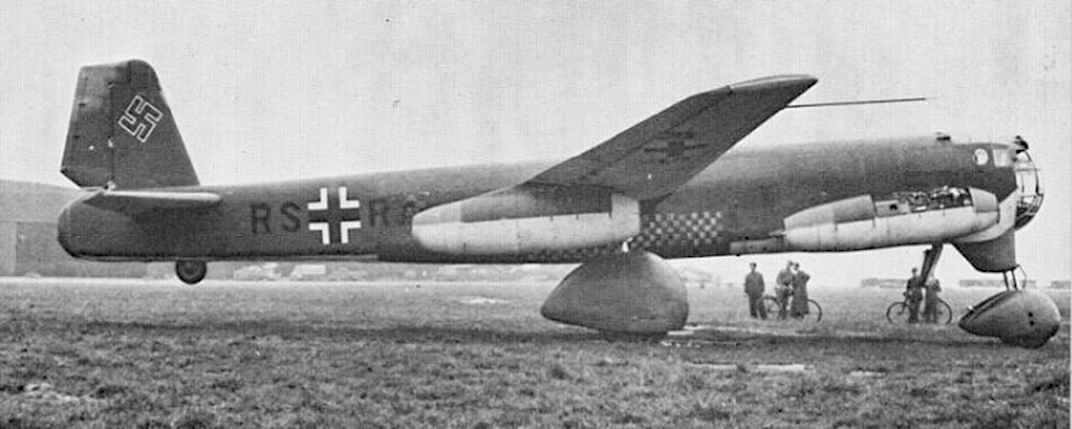
- Side view of Junkers Ju 287 V1 at Brandis prior to first flight, August 1944

General information
- Type: Bomber prototype
- Manufacturer: Junkers
- Designer: Philipp von Doepp
- Status: Prototype
- Primary user: Luftwaffe (intended)
- Number built: 2 (Ju 287 V1 flown, Ju 287 V2 almost completed)

History
- Manufactured: 1944-1945
- First flight: 8 August 1944
- Variant: OKB-1 EF 131
- Developed into: OKB-1 140

The Junkers Ju 287 was a multi-engine tactical jet bomber built in Nazi Germany in 1944. It featured a novel forward-swept wing, and the first two prototypes (which were aerodynamic testbeds for the production Ju 287) were among the very few jet propelled aircraft ever built with fixed landing gear.

== Development ==
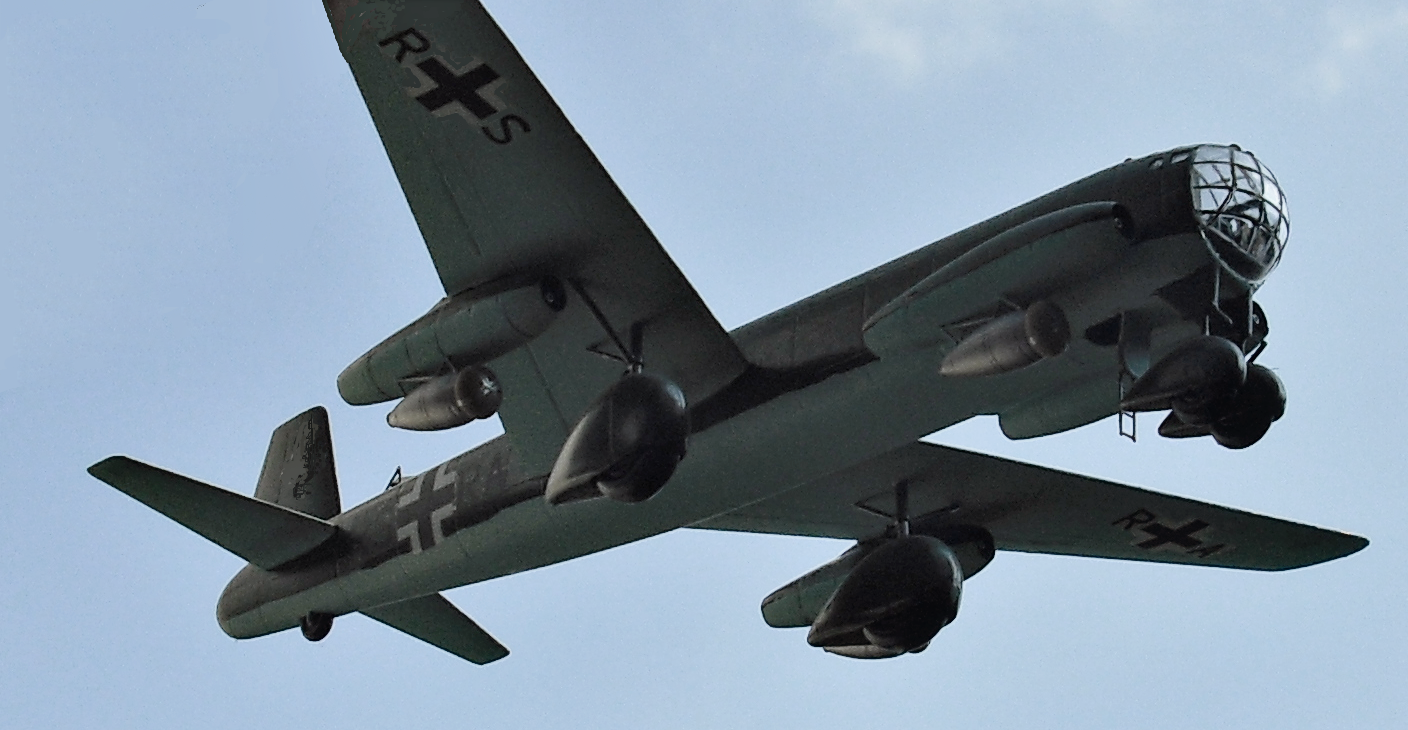
Model of Ju 287 V1 from side bottom view

The Ju 287 was intended to provide the Luftwaffe with a bomber that could avoid interception by outrunning enemy fighters. The swept-forward wing was suggested by the project's head designer Dr. Hans Wocke as a way of providing extra lift at low airspeeds—necessary because of the poor responsiveness of early turbojets at the vulnerable times of takeoff and landing. A further structural advantage of the forward-swept wing was that it would allow for a single massive weapons bay in the best location, the centre of gravity of the plane, with the main wing spar passing behind the bomb bay. The same structural requirement meant the wing could then be located at the best aerodynamic location, the centre of the fuselage. Prior to the assembly of the first Ju 287, an He 177 A-3 (designated as an He 177 prototype, V38) was modified at the Letov plant in Prague to examine the technical characteristics of this single large bomb bay design.

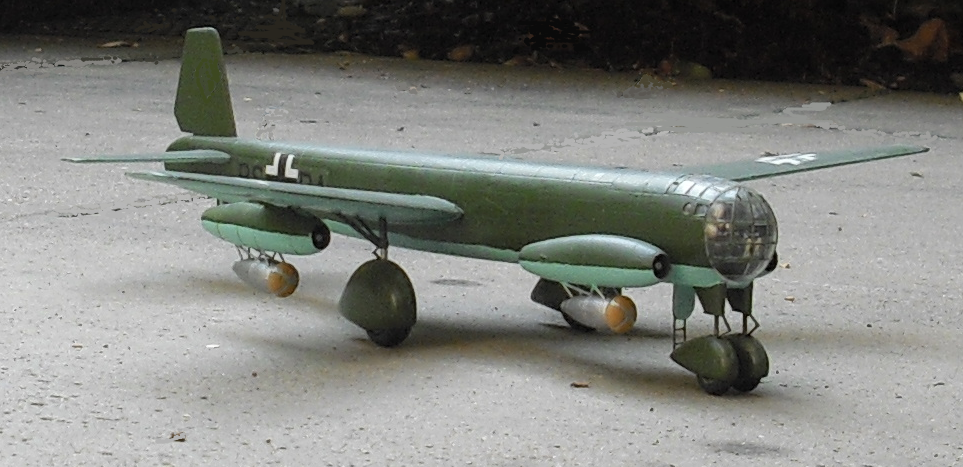
Side view (Model)

The first and second prototypes (Ju 287 V1 and V2; both designated Ju 288 V201 and Ju 288 V202 for security reasons) were intended to evaluate the concept, with V1 being intended to test the FSW and V2 being earmarked for evaluating flight at high subsonic speeds, and both were assembled from the fuselages of the He 177 A-3, the tail of the Ju 188G-2, main undercarriage and nosewheels taken from shot-down B-24 Liberators, all of which were fixed to lower weight and complexity, and equipped with spats to reduce drag. The fixed undercarriage was used as the wing box could not have cutouts for wheel stowage which would reduce wing torsion box stiffness required for the forward sweep design. Later prototypes with higher power engines and higher top speed would have the undercarriage stowage in the centre fuselage sides. Two of the Jumo 004 engines were hung in nacelles (pods) under the wings, with the other two mounted in nacelles added to the sides of the forward fuselage. The Ju 287 had been initially intended to be powered by four Heinkel-Hirth HeS 011 engines, but because of the development problems experienced with that engine, the BMW 003 was selected in its place. The second prototype (Junkers Ju 287 V2) would have had six engines (originally four underwing BMW 003s and two fuselage-mounted Jumo 004s, but later changed to two triple clusters composed of four Jumo 004s and two BMW 003s), and also differed from the Ju 287 V1 in having the main undercarriage struts with an inward cant, the horizontal stabilizer lowered by 30 centimeters, and light grey-colored trouser pants for the nose wheels. The third and fourth prototypes, the Ju 287 V3 and V4, had six BMW 003s in a triple cluster under each wing, and featured the all-new fuselage and tail design intended for the production bomber, the Ju 287A-1, utilizing a pressurised cockpit used on the Junkers Ju 288. The Ju 287 V5 and V6 were similar but had tail armament, full operational equipment, and ejection seats. The Ju 287B-1 would have had six Junkers Jumo 004s arranged in the same configuration as the BMW 003s that were to power the Ju 287A-1.

Rocket engine Walter HWK 109-501 on display at the Polish Aviation Museum

Flight tests began on 8 August 1944 (pilot: Siegfried Holzbaur), with the aircraft displaying extremely good handling characteristics, as well as revealing some of the problems of the forward-swept wing under some flight conditions. The most notable of these drawbacks was excessive in-flight flexing of the main spar and wing assembly in the manner of wing warping. Tests suggested that the warping problem would be eliminated by concentrating greater engine mass under the wings. This technical improvement would be incorporated in the subsequent prototypes with the under wing engines moved forward under the leading edge as a mass balance. The components for the Junkers Ju 287 V2 had been completed by that time, and were shipped to Brandis for final assembly. Seventeen test flights of the Ju 287 V1 were undertaken in total, which passed without notable incident. Minor problems, however, did arise with the turbojet engines and the equally-experimental HWK 109-501 higher-thrust (14.71 kN apiece) bipropellant Starthilfe RATO booster units, which proved to be unreliable over sustained periods. This initial test phase was designed purely to assess the low-speed handling qualities of the forward-swept wing, but despite this the V1 was dived at full jet power on at least one occasion, attaining a speed in the medium dive-angle employed of 660 km/h. To gain data on airflow patterns, small woolen tufts were glued to the airframe and the "behavior" of these tufts during flight was captured by a cine camera mounted on a sturdy tripod directly ahead of the plane's tailfin. After the seventeenth and last flight in September 1944, the V1 was transferred to the Luftwaffe's primary Erprobungsstelle evaluation and test centre at Rechlin, for flow tests. By this time, the Ju 287 program along with the Heinkel He 343 project were shelved to save resources for the Volksjäger emergency fighter program. However, in March 1945, for unknown reasons, the Ju 287 program was restarted, with the RLM issuing a requirement for mass production of the jet bomber (100 airframes a month) as soon as possible.

== Postwar development ==
The Junkers factory in Dessau was overrun by the Red Army in late April 1945. Before long, the Junkers Ju 287 V2 had been almost completed, waiting for its engines to be fitted, and construction of the V3 had reached 80-90 percent completion, while the V4 was reportedly 60 percent complete. Both V1 and V2 were destroyed by the personnel at the Luftwaffe test base in Brandis to avoid capture by Allied forces. Wocke and his staff were captured by the Red Army and taken to the Soviet Union, and remnants of V2, especially the wings, were used in construction of the EF 131 which was flown on 23 May 1947, but by that time, jet development had already overtaken the Ju 287. A final much-enlarged derivative, the EF 140, was tested in prototype form in 1949 but soon abandoned.

== Variants ==
Data from: Junkers Ju 287: The World's First Swept-Wing Jet Aircraft

Ju 287 V1 (cover designation Ju 288 V201)
First prototype, technology demonstrator with fixed landing gear, fuselage taken from He 177A-5, tail empennage taken from Ju 188G-2, and 4 × Jumo 004B engines.

Ju 287 V2 (cover designation Ju 288 V202)
Second prototype; similar to Ju 287 V1 in overall layout, but with tail wheel removed, horizontal stabilizer lowered 30 cm (12 in), and inward main undercarriage braces; originally intended to utilize 4 × BMW 003s in underwing pairs and 2 × Jumo 004Bs mounted on the sides of the fuselage, but engine configuration later changed to utilize two underwing pods comprising 3 × BMW 003 engines. Virtually complete when Ju 287 program halted in late 1944, but not flown.

Ju 287 V3
Third prototype, intended prototype for Ju 287A-1; fuselage based on that of the Ju 288, fully glazed, pressurized cockpit accommodating three crewmembers; retractable landing gear, no provision for armament, and 6 × BMW 003 engines mounted in two triple pack configurations under the wings. Approximately 80–90% complete by war's end.

Ju 287 V4
Fourth prototype; reportedly 60 percent complete on the eve of Allied takeover of Junkers factory at Dessau.

Ju 287 V5 & V6
Armed prototypes equipped with ejection seats and an FHL 131/Z turret with two MG 131 machine guns.

Ju 287 A-1
Production version with six BMW 003s in two underwing triple clusters, operational equipment and FHL 131/Z turret featuring two MG 131 machine guns; no ejection seat.

Ju 287 B-1
Production version with six Jumo 004s in two underwing triple clusters, FHL 131/Z with two MG 131 machine guns, and larger nose wheels; no ejection seat.

EF 125
Proposed design powered by either two Junkers Jumo 012 or BMW 018 turbojets mounted under the wings.

EF 131
Similar to production Ju 287 but with two underwing triple clusters of RD-10s; prototype only.

== Specifications (Ju 287 V1) ==
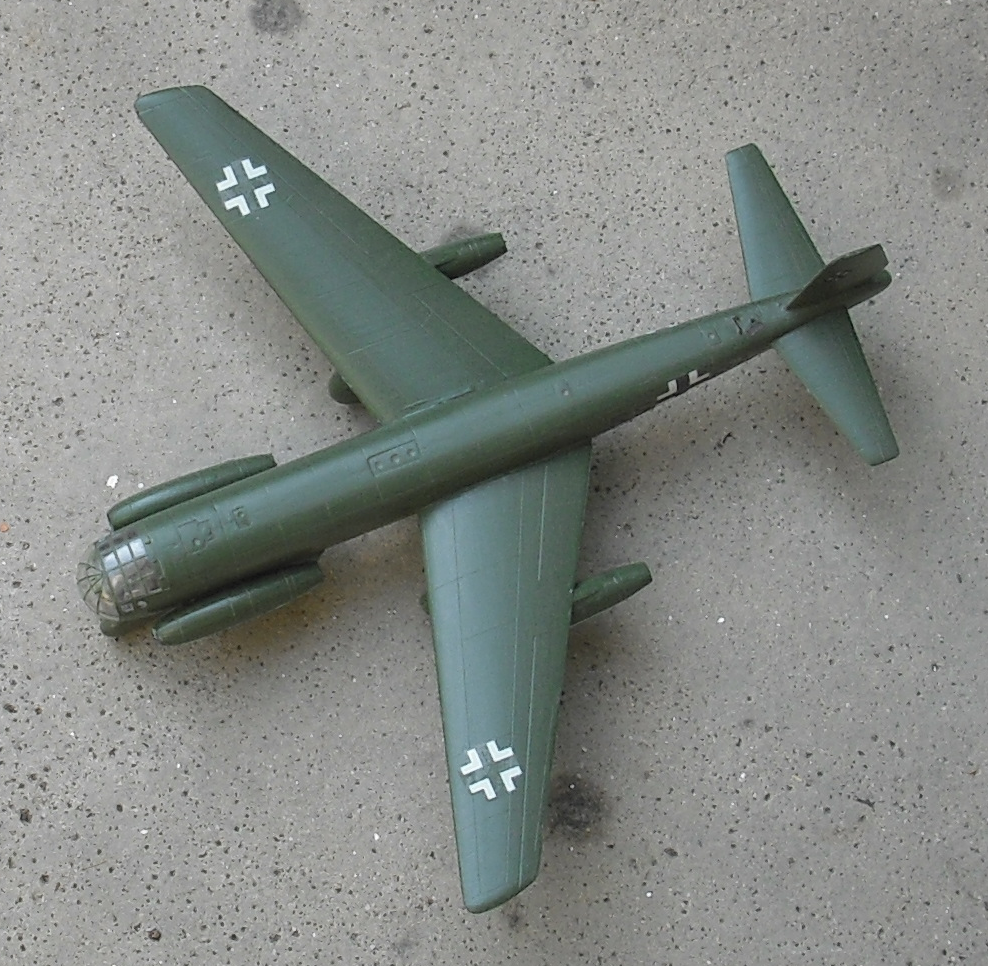
Top view (Model)

Data from

General characteristics

- Crew: 2
- Length: 18.30 m (60 ft 0 in)
- Wingspan: 20.11 m (66 ft 0 in)
- Height: 4.70 m (15 ft 5 in)
- Wing area: 61 m^{2} (660 sq ft)
- Airfoil: root: Ju 0.9 23 10.7-0.825-40; tip: Ju 0.9 23 12.7-0.825-40
- Empty weight: 12,500 kg (27,558 lb)
- Gross weight: 20,000 kg (44,092 lb)
- Powerplant: 4 × Junkers Jumo 004B-1 turbojet engines, 8.825 kN (1,984 lbf) thrust each

Performance

- Maximum speed: 558 km/h (347 mph, 302 kn) at 6,000 m (20,000 ft)
- Cruise speed: 512 km/h (318 mph, 276 kn) at 7,000 m (23,000 ft)
- Range: 1,570 km (980 mi, 850 nmi)
- Service ceiling: 9,400 m (30,800 ft)
- Rate of climb: 9.7 m/s (1,910 ft/min)

== See also ==
- Grumman X-29
- Sukhoi Su-47

Related development

- OKB-1 EF 131
- OKB-1 EF 140

Related lists

- List of jet aircraft of World War II
- List of military aircraft of Germany
