= OKB-1 EF 131 =

Soviet/German jet bomber project

EF 131
- OKB-1 EF 131 parked at Ramenskoye, spring 1948

General information
- Type: Bomber
- National origin: USSR
- Manufacturer: GOZ-1
- Designer: Dr. Brunolf Baade
- Status: Cancelled
- Number built: 1

History
- First flight: 23 May 1947
- Retired: 1948
- Developed from: Junkers Ju 287
- Variant: OKB-1 140

The OKB-1/Junkers EF 131 was a jet bomber produced in Germany and the USSR from 1944. It was cancelled in August 23, 1948, after further work was stopped on the aircraft.

== Development ==
The EF-131 was developed based on fragments of project documentation for the Ju 287 after the Red Army captured the Junkers factory in Dessau. The first prototype was built from components of the Junkers Ju 287 V2 and V3, the second and third prototypes (V – Versuchs – test/research/prototype) of the Luftwaffe's radical forward-swept-wing jet bomber. The V2 was nearly complete before the end of World War 2, but was hidden in the forest at Brandis along with Ju 287 V1 and eventually blown up by the Germans to avoid capture by US forces, and remnants of it, including wing sections, were taken into Red Air Force hands under military intelligence supervision along with the skeletal airframe of the unfinished V3. The V3 was to have been the first 287 to be made to pre-production model specifications, and the eventual EF-131 was almost identical to it in terms of overall design, except in having a slightly longer fuselage. The airplane was completed in the Soviet zone of occupied Germany, but was dismantled and transported to GOZ-1, (Gosudarstvenny Optniy Zavod – state experimental plant), at Dubna near Moscow, because the victorious Allies forbade the construction and testing of aircraft in occupied Germany. OKB-1 at GOZ-1 was formed with Dr. Brunolf Baade as the chief designer, and a very talented team of German engineers seconded by the Soviet government. Extreme pressure was applied to get the aircraft ready to appear in the 1947 Aviation Day fly-past at Tushino airfield, but several factors combined to prevent the EF-131 from appearing.

Flight testing in the USSR began on 23 May 1947, at the LII airfield, after the airframe had been strengthened to meet the requirements of a TsAGI(Tsentralniy Aerodinamicheskiy i Gidrodinamicheskiy Institut- central aerodynamics and hydrodynamics institute) structural survey, which revealed major weaknesses of the airframe. The first flight resulted in the port undercarriage collapsing due to a bolt failure, subsequent flight tests revealed major deficiencies such as nosewheel shimmy and tail surface vibration. Rectification of the defects caused many delays but the worst delays were caused by bureaucracy when it was decreed that foreign workers could not work at the LII airfield.

The aircraft sat at LII over the winter but the harsh conditions caused the deterioration of rubber components and wiring, which required lengthy repairs. Preparations for resuming flight tests were almost complete in June 1948 when Ministry of Aircraft Industry Order No. 440 ordered that further work on the EF-131 be discontinued, termination of the programme being confirmed by resolution No.3206-1301 issued on 23 August 1948.

The EF-131 had become obsolete as newer Soviet-built engines with better performance became available. The airframe of the second prototype was used for the 140 programme.

== Specifications (EF 131) ==
Data from

General characteristics

- Crew: 3
- Length: 20.47 m (67 ft 2 in)
- Wingspan: 19.4 m (63 ft 8 in)
- Height: 5.7 m (18 ft 8 in)
- Airfoil: root: Ju 0.9 23 10.7-0.825-40; tip: Ju 0.9 23 12.7-0.825-40
- Empty weight: 11,900 kg (26,235 lb)
- Gross weight: 22,955 kg (50,607 lb)
- Powerplant: 6 × Junkers Motoren Jumo 109-004 turbojet engines, 8.829 kN (1,985 lbf) thrust each

Performance

- Maximum speed: 860 km/h (530 mph, 460 kn)
- Range: 1,710 km (1,060 mi, 920 nmi)
- Service ceiling: 12,500 m (41,000 ft)

Armament

- Guns: 2 x 13mm machine-guns in a remotely controlled tail barbette
- Bombs: 2,000kg (4,410 lb) of bombs in an internal bomb bay

== See also ==
Related development

- Junkers Ju 287

Aircraft of comparable role, configuration, and era

- Martin XB-48
- Martin XB-51

Related lists

- List of aircraft

== Bibliography ==
- Gunston, Bill. "The Osprey Encyclopaedia of Russian Aircraft 1875–1995". London, Osprey. 1995. ISBN 1-85532-405-9
- Gordon, Yefim. "Early Soviet Jet Bombers". Hinkley, Midland. 2004. ISBN 1-85780-181-4
