= History of Soviet Russia and the Soviet Union (1917–1927) =

Period of history of Russia

- 1917–1927
History of Russia (1894–1917)	History of the Soviet Union (1927–1953)
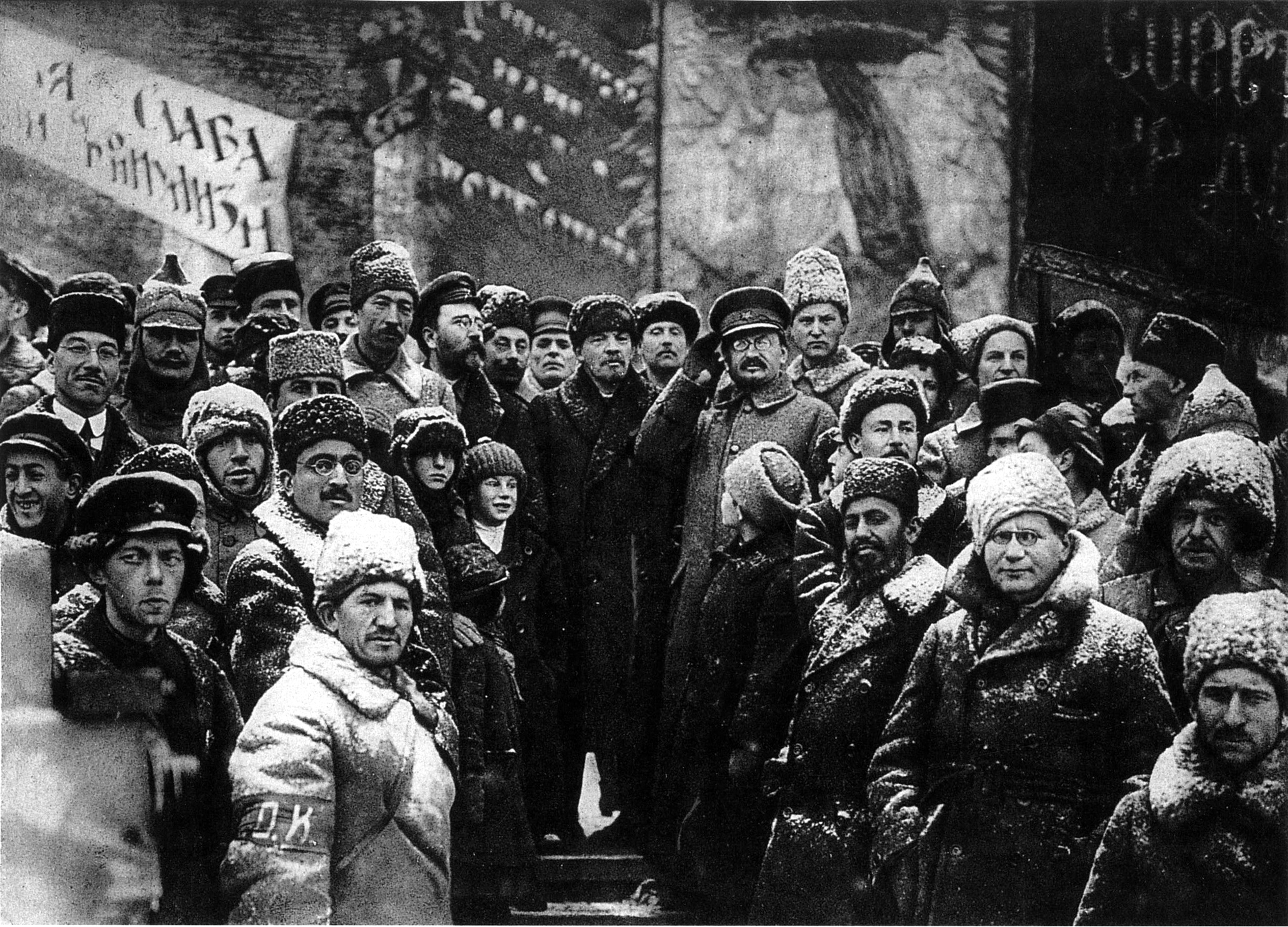
- Vladimir Lenin, Leon Trotsky and Lev Kamenev celebrating the second anniversary of the October Revolution
- Location: Soviet Russia → Soviet Union
- Including: February Revolution; Revolutions of 1917–1923
- Leader(s): Vladimir Lenin; Joseph Stalin
- President: Mikhail Kalinin
- Key events: World War I October Revolution; Russian Civil War; Polish–Soviet War; Treaty on the Creation of the Union of Soviet Socialist Republics; New Economic Policy; Death and state funeral of Vladimir Lenin

The ten years 1917–1927, saw a radical transformation of the Russian Empire into a socialist state, the Soviet Union: initially called Soviet Russia from 1917 to 1922 and then the Soviet Union from 1922 onward. This period spanned the 1917 Russian revolutions to Joseph Stalin's rise to power in 1927.

Following the February Revolution in 1917 that deposed Tsar Nicholas, a short-lived provisional government had given way to Bolsheviks in the October Revolution. After winning the Russian Civil War (1917–1923), the Bolsheviks solidified their political control. They were dedicated to a version of Marxism developed by Vladimir Lenin, promising the workers would rise, destroy capitalism, and create a socialist society under the leadership of the Communist Party of the Soviet Union. The awkward problem, regarding Marxist revolutionary theory, was the small proletariat, in an overwhelmingly peasant society with limited industry and a very small middle class.

The Bolshevik Party was renamed the Russian Communist Party (RCP). All politics and attitudes that were not strictly RCP were suppressed, under the premise that the RCP represented the proletariat and all activities contrary to the party's beliefs were "counterrevolutionary" or "anti-socialist." Most rich families fled to exile. During 1917 to 1923, the Bolshevik government capitulated to Germany in World War I, then fought an intense civil war against multiple enemies especially the White Army. They won the Russian heartland but lost most non-Russian areas that had been part of Imperial Russia. One by one defeating each opponent, the RCP established itself through the Russian heartland and some non-Russian areas such as Ukraine and the Caucasus. It became the Communist Party of the Soviet Union (CPSU) upon the creation of the Soviet Union (USSR) in 1922. Following Lenin's death in 1924, Joseph Stalin, General Secretary of the CPSU, became the leader of the USSR, being general secretary from the early 1920s to his death in 1953.

== Russian Revolution of 1917 ==
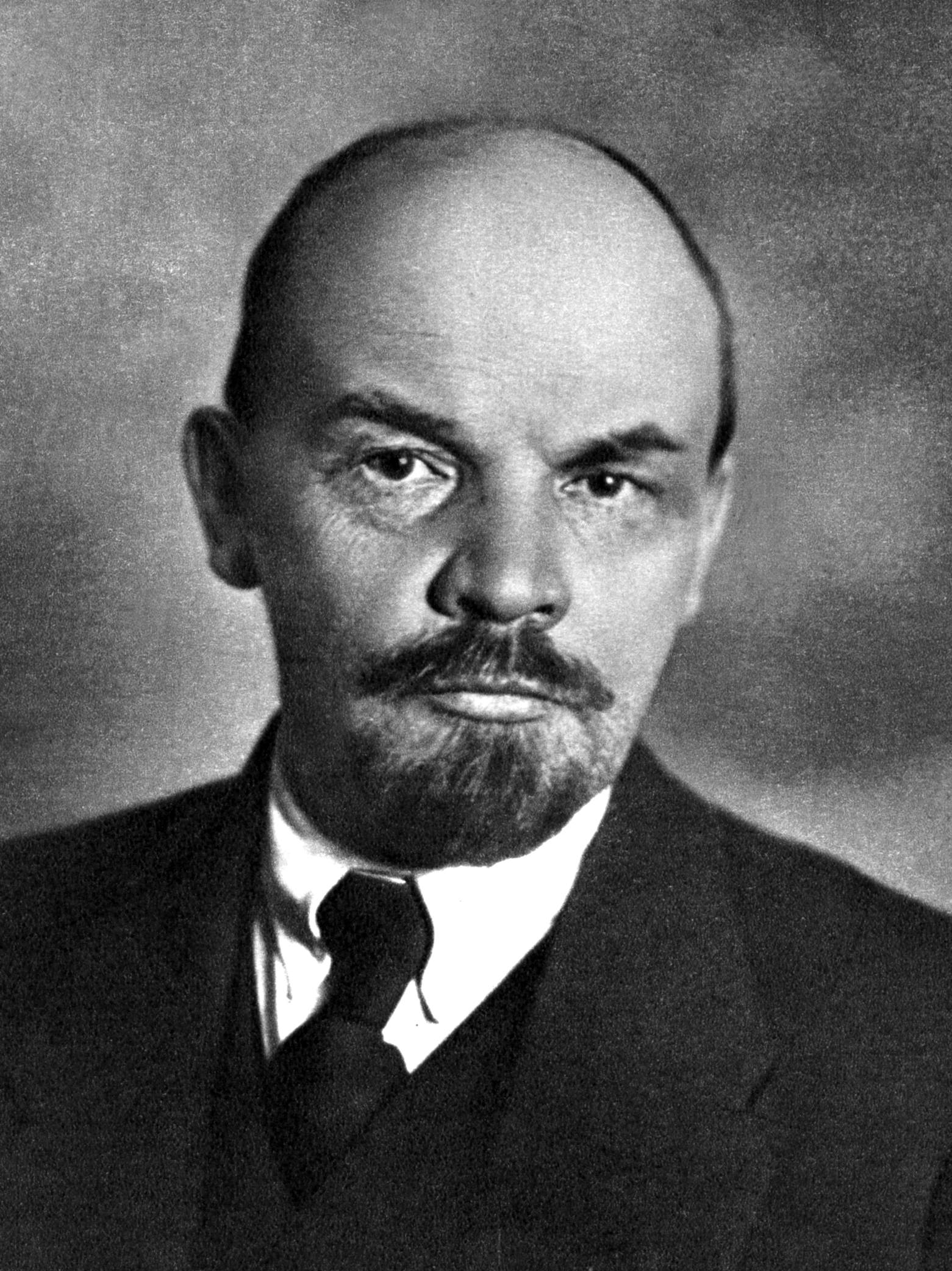
Vladimir Lenin, founder of the Soviet Union and the leader of the Bolshevik party.

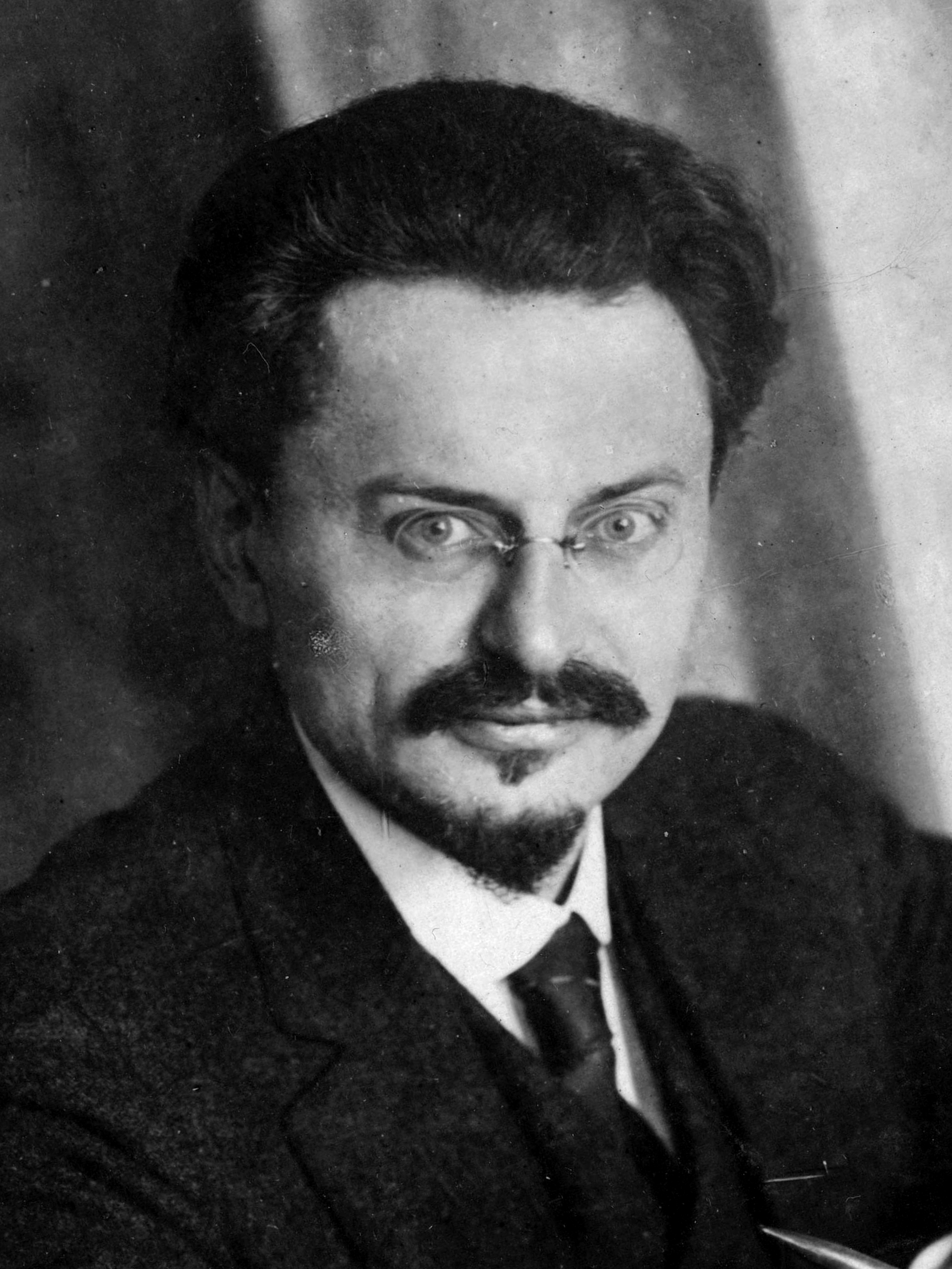
Leon Trotsky, founder of the Red Army and a key figure in the October Revolution.

During World War I, Tsarist Russia experienced military humiliation, famine and economic collapse. The demoralized Imperial Russian Army suffered severe military setbacks, and many captured soldiers deserted the front lines. Dissatisfaction with the monarchy and its policy of continuing the war grew among the Russian people. Tsar Nicholas II abdicated the throne following the February Revolution of 1917 (March 1917 N.S. See: Soviet calendar.), causing widespread rioting in Petrograd and other major Russian cities.

The Russian Provisional Government was installed immediately following the fall of the Tsar by the Provisional Committee of the State Duma in early March 1917 and received conditional support of the Mensheviks. Led first by Prince Georgy Lvov, then Alexander Kerensky the Provisional Government consisted mainly of the parliamentarians most recently elected to the State Duma of the Russian Empire, which had been overthrown alongside the Tsar. The new Provisional Government maintained its commitment to the war, remaining in the Triple Entente with Britain and France. The Provisional Government postponed the land reforms demanded by the Bolsheviks.

Lenin, and his assistant Joseph Stalin embodying the Bolshevik ideology, viewed alliance with the countries of Western Europe and the United States as slavery of the proletariat, who was forced to fight the imperialists' war. As seen by Lenin, Russia was reverting to the rule of the Tsar, and it was the job of Marxist revolutionaries, who truly represented socialism and the proletariat, to oppose such counter-socialistic ideas and support socialist revolutions in other countries.

Within the military, mutiny and desertion were pervasive among conscripts. The intelligentsia was dissatisfied over the slow pace of social reforms; poverty was worsening, income disparities and inequality were becoming out of control while the Provisional Government grew increasingly autocratic and inefficient. The government appeared to be on the verge of succumbing to a military junta. Deserting soldiers returned to the cities and gave their weapons to angry, and extremely hostile, socialist factory workers. The deplorable and inhumane poverty and starvation of major Russian centers produced optimum conditions for revolutionaries.

During the months between February and October 1917, the power of the Provisional Government was consistently questioned by nearly all political parties. A system of "dual power" emerged, in which the Provisional Government held nominal power, though increasingly opposed by the Petrograd Soviet, their chief adversary, controlled by the Mensheviks and Socialist Revolutionaries (both democratic socialist parties politically to the right of the Bolsheviks). The Soviet chose not to force further changes in government due to the belief that the February Revolution was Russia's "crowing" overthrow of the bourgeois. The Soviet also believed that the new Provisional Government would be tasked with implementing democratic reforms and pave the way for a proletarian revolution. The creation of a government not based on the dictatorship of the proletariat in any form was viewed as a "retrograde step" in Vladmir Lenin's April Theses. However, the Provisional Government still remained an overwhelmingly powerful governing body.

Failed military offensives in summer 1917 and large scale protesting and riots in major Russian cities (as advocated by Lenin in his Theses, known as the July Days) led to the deployment of troops in late August to restore order. The July Days were suppressed and blamed on the Bolsheviks, forcing Lenin into hiding. Still, rather than use force, many of the deployed soldiers and military personnel joined the rioters, disgracing the government and military at-large. It was during this time that support for the Bolsheviks grew and another of its leading figures, Leon Trotsky, was elected chair of the Petrograd Soviet, which had complete control over the defenses of the city, mainly, the city's military force. Membership of the Bolshevik party had risen from 24,000 members in February 1917 to 200,000 members by September 1917.

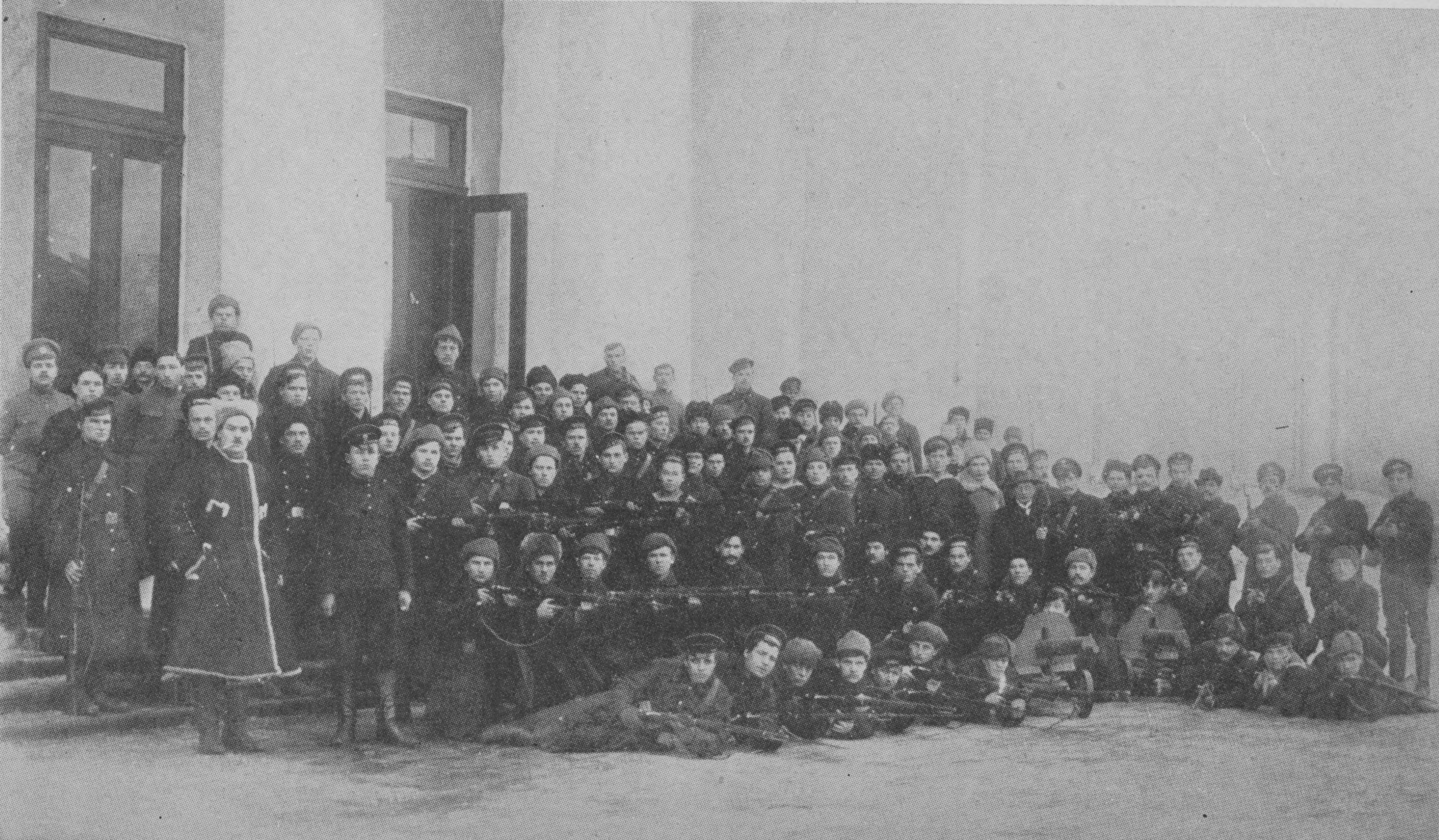
A detachment of Red Guard sailors who dissolved the Constituent Assembly

In the early days of the October Revolution, the Provisional Government moved against the Bolsheviks, arresting activists and destroying pro-Communist propaganda. The Bolsheviks were able to portray this as an attack against the People's Soviet and garnered support for the Red Guard of Petrograd to take over the Provisional Government. The administrative offices and government buildings were taken with little opposition or bloodshed. The generally accepted end of this transitional revolutionary period, which will lead to the creation of the Union of Soviet Socialist Republics (USSR) lies with the assault and capture of the poorly defended Winter Palace (the traditional home and symbol of power of the Tsar) on the evening of 26 October 1917.

Bolshevik figures such as Anatoly Lunacharsky, Moisei Uritsky and Dmitry Manuilsky agreed that Lenin's influence on the Bolshevik party was decisive but the October insurrection was carried out according to Trotsky's, not to Lenin's plan.

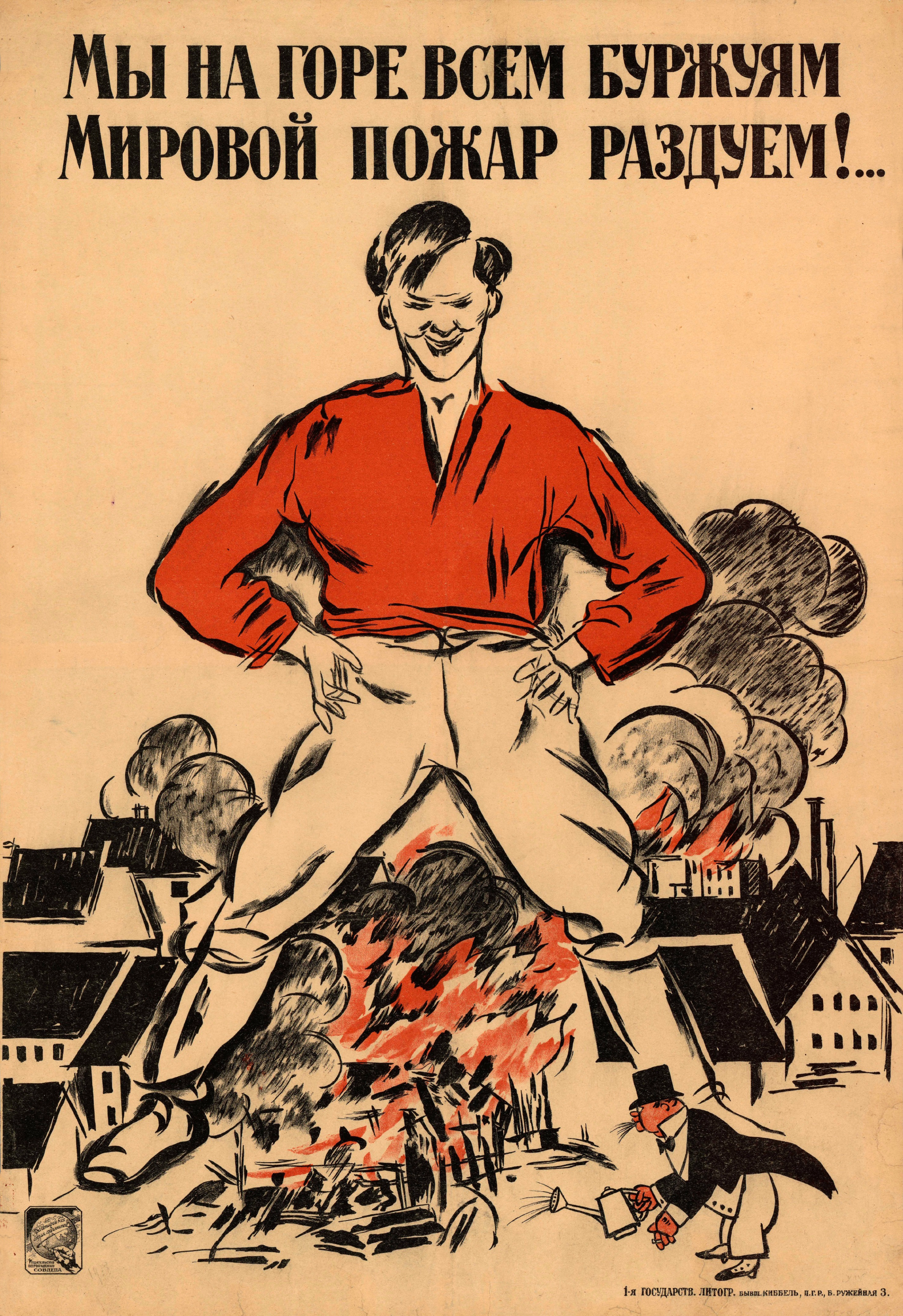
To the grief of all the bourgeois we'll fan a worldwide conflagration!, a Soviet poster with the words from the poem The Twelve by Alexander Blok (artist Alexander Zelenskiy)

The Mensheviks and the right wing of the Socialist Revolutionaries, outraged by the abusive and coercive acts carried out by the Red Guard and Bolsheviks, fled Petrograd, leaving control in the hands of the Bolsheviks and remaining Left Socialist Revolutionaries. Second All-Russian Congress of Soviets of Workers' and Soldiers' Deputies held on 7–9 November 1917 formed the Council of People's Commissars as the new government headed by Lenin and issued Decree on Peace and Decree on Land. Then the Left Socialist Revolutionaries entered the Council of People's Commissars, which became a coalition government of Bolsheviks and Left Socialist Revolutionaries

Red Guard in Chelyabinsk, 1917–1918

The period from November 1917 to February 1918 was distinguished by the relative speed and ease of establishing the power of the Bolsheviks and eliminating the armed resistance of their opponents. The victory of the uprising in Petrograd marked the beginning of the transfer of power into the hands of the Soviets in all major cities of Russia. A series of radical legislative acts was issued, fulfilling revolutionary promises to the working class, and completely dismantling the old Tsarist social and economic order.

Russian Constituent Assembly met for 13 hours, from 4 p.m. to 5 a.m., 18–19 January [O.S. 5–6 January] 1918, whereupon it was dissolved by the Bolshevik-led All-Russian Central Executive Committee. Third All-Russian Congress of Workers', Soldiers' and Peasants Deputies' Soviets which took place on 23-31 January 1918 [O.S. 10-18 January 1918] renamed the unrecognised state, calling it Russian Soviet Republic.

== Russian Civil War ==
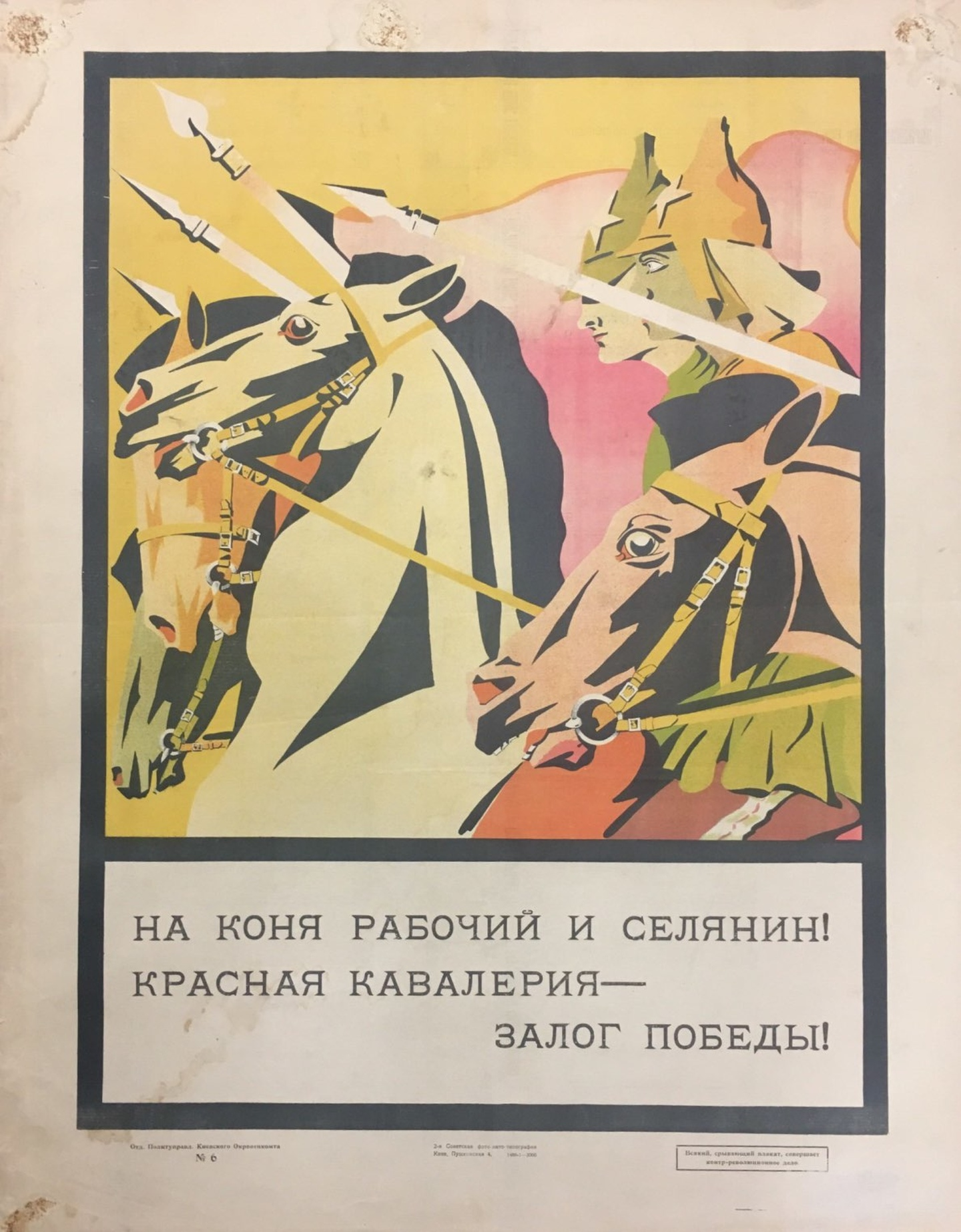
1919 poster, "Mount your horses, workers and peasants! The Red Cavalry is the pledge of victory."

Prior to the revolution, the Bolshevik doctrine of democratic centralism argued that only a tightly knit and secretive organization could successfully overthrow the government; after the revolution, they argued that only such an organization could prevail against foreign and domestic enemies. Fighting the civil war would actually force the party to put these principles into practice.

Arguing that the revolution needed not a mere parliamentary organization but a party of action which would function as a scientific body of direction, a vanguard of activists, and a central control organ, the Tenth Party Congress banned factions within the party, initially intending it only to be a temporary measure after the shock of the Kronstadt rebellion. It was also argued that the party should be an elite body of professional revolutionaries dedicating their lives to the cause and carrying out their decisions with iron discipline, thus moving toward putting loyal party activists in charge of new and old political institutions, army units, factories, hospitals, universities, and food suppliers. Against this backdrop, the nomenklatura system (a class of people who were granted key positions only with approval of the party) would evolve and become standard practice.

In theory, this system was to be democratic since all leading party organs would be elected from below, but also centralized since lower bodies would be accountable to higher organizations. In practice, "democratic centralism" was centralist, with decisions of higher organs binding on lower ones, and the composition of lower bodies largely determined by the members of higher ones. Over time, party cadres would grow increasingly careerist and professional. Party membership required exams, special courses, special camps, schools, and nominations by three existing members.

On 14 June 1918, representatives of the Right Socialist-Revolutionaries and the Mensheviks were expelled from the All-Russian Central Executive Committee by a Bolshevik decree. Left Socialist-Revolutionaries, who resigned its position in government after the signing of the Treaty of Brest-Litovsk in March 1918, ultimately assassinated German ambassador Wilhelm von Mirbach oт 6 July 1918 in an attempt to cause Russia to re-enter World War I and launched an ill-fated uprising against the Bolsheviks shortly after. The resulting expulsion of the Left SRs from the All-Russian Central Executive Committee meant that the few sessions of the body that followed the Fifth All-Russian Congress of Soviets had a ceremonial character, all opposition to the Bolsheviks having been excluded from them. For many historians, July 1918 is considered the milestone of the final formation of a one-party Bolshevik dictatorship in the country, since after July 1918 the representation of other parties in the Soviets became insignificant.

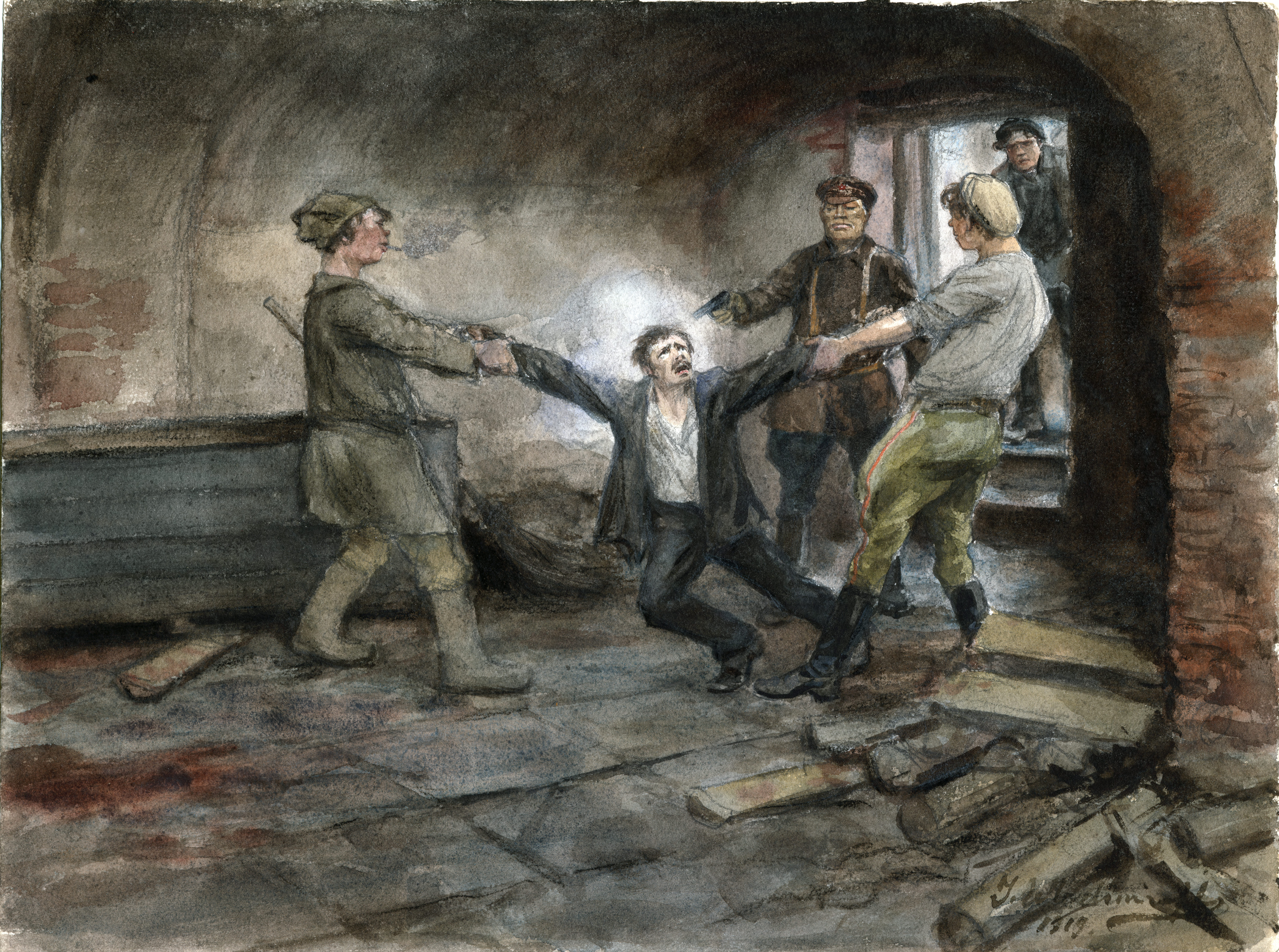
"In the basements of a Cheka", by Ivan Vladimirov

In December 1917, the Cheka was founded as the Bolshevik's first internal security force following the failed assassination attempt on Lenin's life. Later it changed names to GPU, OGPU, MVD, NKVD and finally KGB. The Red Terror became the instrument to eliminate groups defined as "enemies" of the new society. Summary executions were widespread, including in service of dekulakization (redistribution of wealth from prosperous peasants). Leon Trotsky led the Red Army, despising "bourgeois democracy" and committed to the forced removal of the prosperous and political opponents, often through summary executions. He initiated concentration camps, labor camps, military control over labor, and state control of trade unions.

At the same time, the White Terror, mostly uncontrolled and perpetrated by such warlords as the Cossack atamans Grigory Semenov or Boris Annenkov, targeted suspected Bolshevik sympathizers.

During the Russian civil war the Jewish communities of Ukraine, and to a lesser extent Belarus, suffered the worst pogroms ever to take place in these regions. They were performed by various armed units: by the White Army of Anton Denikin, by troops of the Ukrainian People's Republic headed by Symon Petliura, by gangs of warlord atamans and "Green" insurgent peasants, and even by some Red Army units.

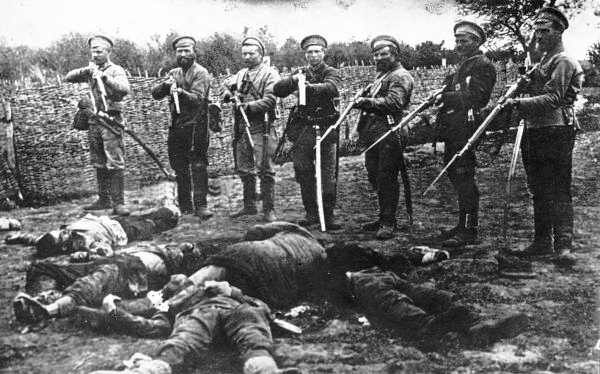
Execution of the members of the Alexandrovo-Gaysky Regional Soviet by Cossacks under the command of Ataman Alexander Dutov, 1918.

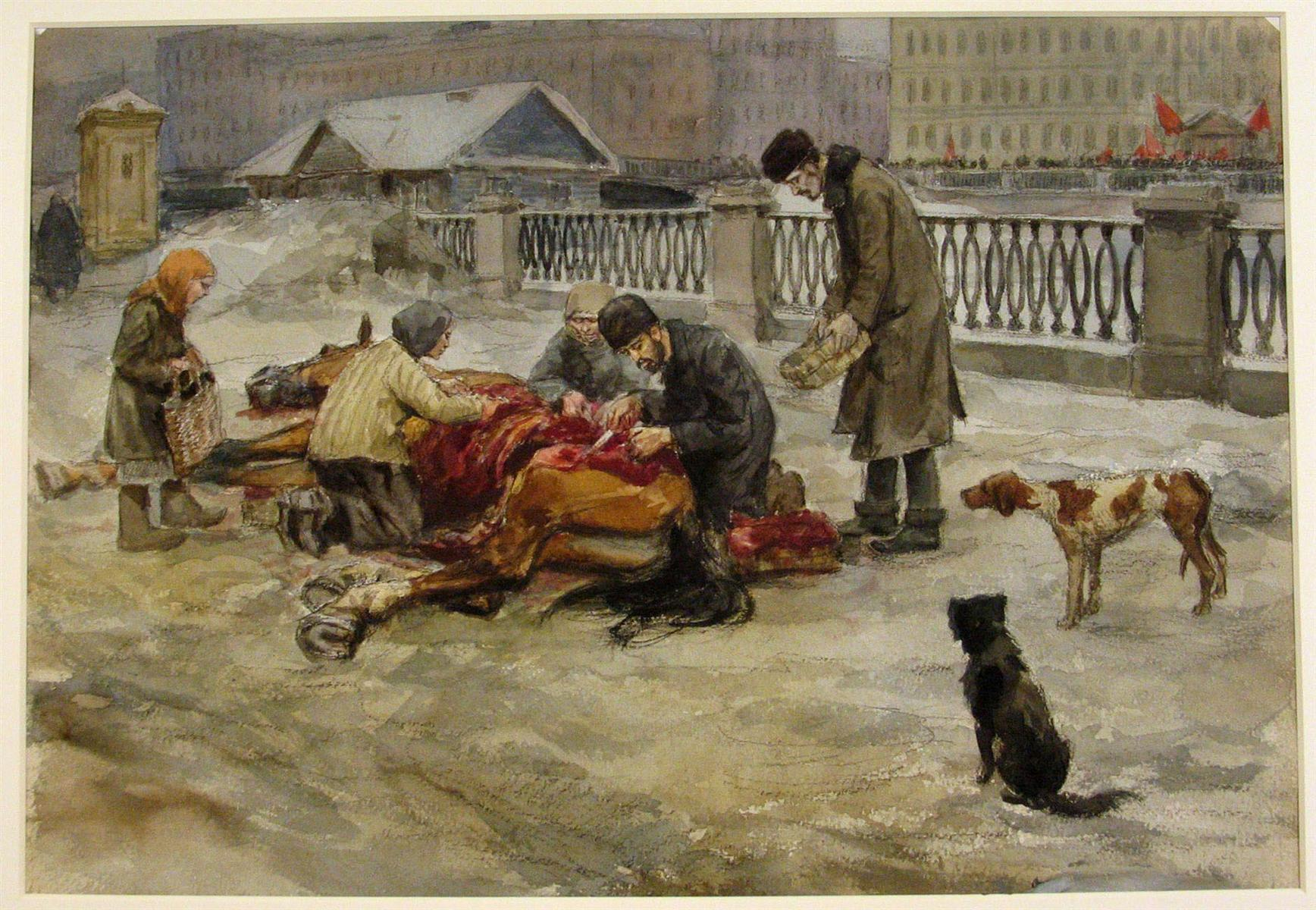
"Famine", by Ivan Vladimirov

The Soviet government was able gradually to consolidate its hold on central Russia first and then to fight its enemies successfully. The Allied intervention and the Polish invasion allowed the Bolsheviks to play the nationalist card. Worsening economic conditions, however, created mass social turmoil. This came to a head after the final defeat of organised White military forces in the autumn of 1920 with mass peasant insurgencies, such as the Tambov Rebellion. They were brutally suppressed.

== Polish–Soviet War ==
The frontiers between Poland, which had established an unstable independent government following World War I, and the former Tsarist empire, were rendered chaotic by the repercussions of the Russian revolutions, the civil war and the winding down of World War I. Poland's Józef Piłsudski envisioned a new federation (Międzymorze), forming a Polish-led East European bloc to form a bulwark against Russia and Germany, while the Russian SFSR considered carrying the revolution westward by force. When Piłsudski carried out a military thrust into Ukraine in 1920, he was met by a Red Army offensive that drove into Polish territory almost to Warsaw. However, Piłsudski halted the Soviet advance at the Battle of Warsaw and resumed the offensive. The "Peace of Riga" signed in early 1921 split the territory of Belarus and Ukraine between Poland and Soviet Russia.

== Creation of the USSR ==
On 29 December 1922 a conference of plenipotentiary delegations from the Russian SFSR, the Transcaucasian SFSR, the Ukrainian SSR and the Byelorussian SSR approved the Treaty on the Creation of the USSR and the Declaration of the Creation of the USSR, forming the Union of Soviet Socialist Republics. These two documents were confirmed by the 1st Congress of Soviets of the USSR and signed by heads of delegations Mikhail Kalinin, Mikhail Tskhakaya, Mikhail Frunze and Grigory Petrovsky, Alexander Chervyakov on 30 December 1922.

== Propaganda and media ==
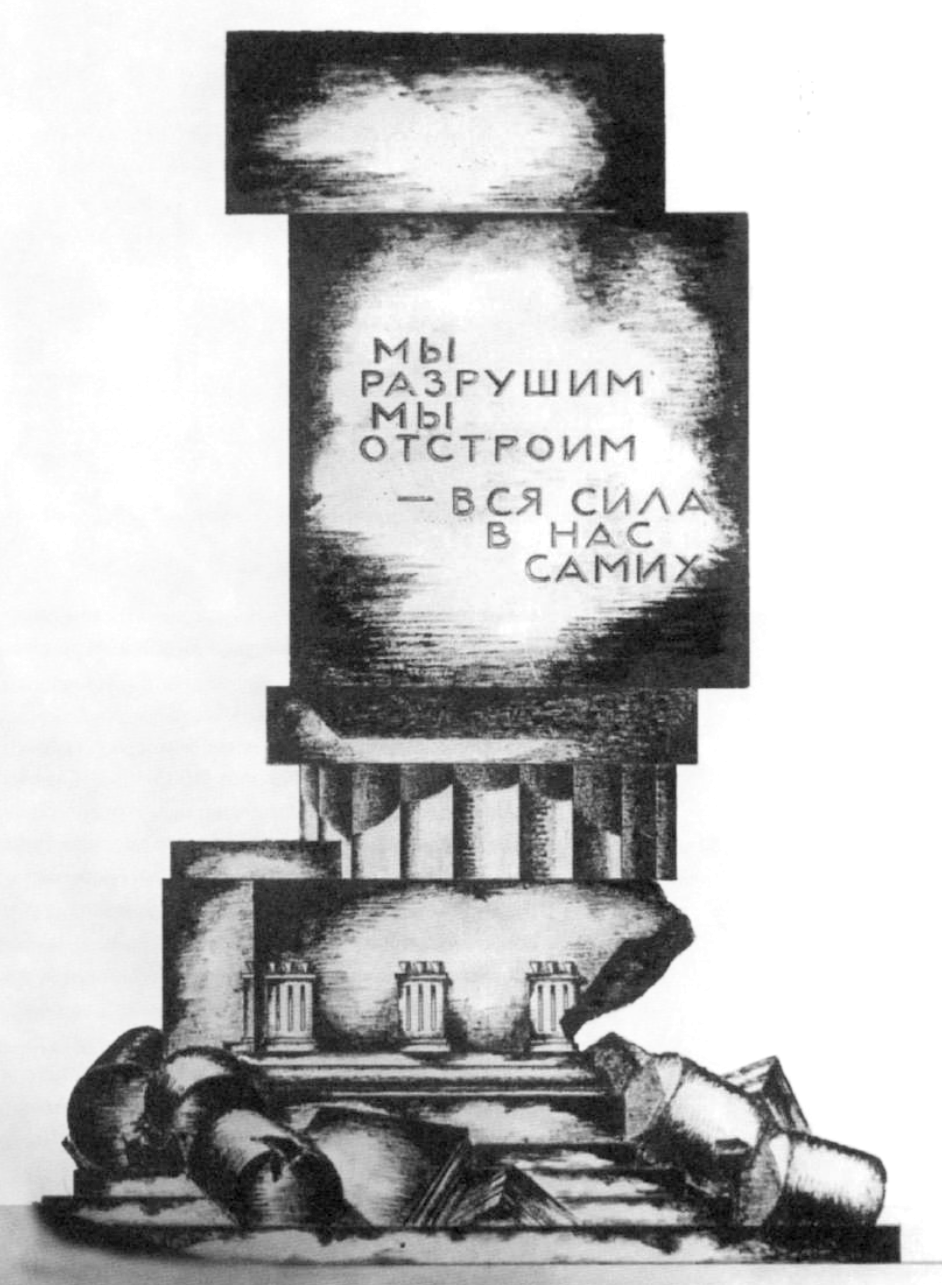
The draft sketch of the Monument to the Revolution by Ivan Fomin (1921). The inscription reads: "We will destroy, we will build anew, the whole power is within us".

Some of the leading Bolsheviks who came to power in 1917 had been pamphleteers or editors, including Lenin, Trotsky, Stalin, Bukharin, and Zinoviev. Lenin set up the daily newspaper Pravda in January 1912. Before it was suppressed by the government in 1914 it was a "singularly effective propaganda and educational instrument which enabled the Bolsheviks to gain control of the Petersburg labour movement and to build up a mass base for their organization." Under Lenin, the Bolsheviks controlled all of the media after 1917. The major national newspapers were Izvestia (the voice of the government), and especially Pravda (the voice of the party). Pravda acquired the first and best printing equipment for illustrations. The leading newspapers developed a specialized rhetorical vocabulary designed to enhance the totalitarian structure of society, with total truth emanating from the top, and all sorts of mischievous errors stemming from clumsy bureaucrats at lower levels, or from devious traitors and spies working on behalf of capitalism.

The Communist leadership was rooted in printed propaganda. Taking over a nation where 90% could not read, they made schools and literacy a high priority in order to optimize printed journalism and propaganda through newspapers and magazines, as well as posters that reached the illiterate older generations.

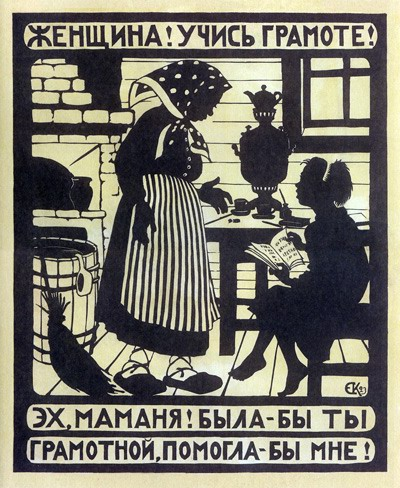
Woman, learn to read and write! - Oh, Mother! If you were literate, you could help me! A poster by Elizaveta Kruglikova advocating female literacy. 1923.

The Likbez (eradication of illiteracy) campaign was started on 26 December 1919, when Vladimir Lenin signed the Decree of the Soviet government "On eradication of illiteracy among the population of RSFSR" ("О ликвидации безграмотности среди населения РСФСР"). According to this decree, all people from 8 to 50 years old were required to become literate in their native language. 40,000 liquidation points (ликпункты) were arranged to serve as centers for education, and achieving literacy. Fighting for time and funding during the ensuing Russian Civil War of 1917–23, Narkompros, the Soviet Ministry of Education, quickly assembled the Cheka Likbez (an acronym for the "Extraordinary Commission for the Liquidation of Illiteracy") which was to be responsible for the training of literacy teachers as well as organizing and propagating the literacy campaign.

Radio was not neglected—it was a major new technology, and was used for political speeches. Soviet authorities realized that the "ham" operator was highly individualistic and encouraged private initiative– too much so for the totalitarian regime. Criminal penalties were imposed but the working solution was to avoid broadcasting over the air. Instead radio programs were transmitted by copper wire, using a hub and spoke system, to loudspeakers in approved listening stations, such as the "Red" corner of a factory.

The Soviet style involved citizens listening to party leaders, using in-person speeches, radio talks or printed speeches. There was little role for the journalist to summarize or interpret the text; there was no commentary or background or discussion. No one questioned or challenged the leadership. There were no press conferences and little in the way of broadcast news.

Foreign correspondents were strictly prevented from any access beyond official spokesmen. The result was a rosy depiction of Soviet life in the Western media before Khrushchev exposed Stalin's horrors in the 1950s. The most famous exemplar was Walter Duranty of the New York Times.

== War Communism ==
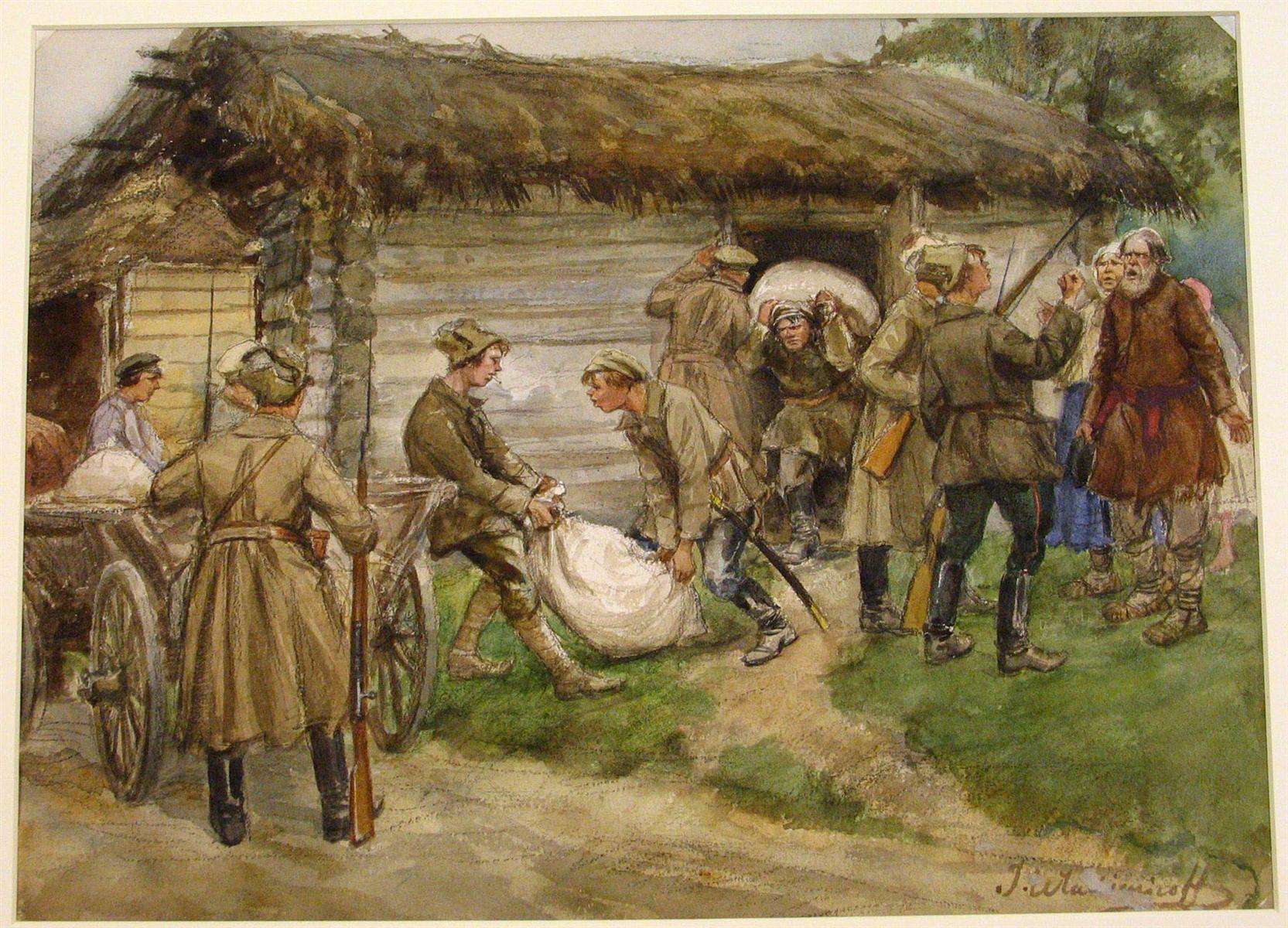
Corn requisitioning, by Ivan Vladimirov

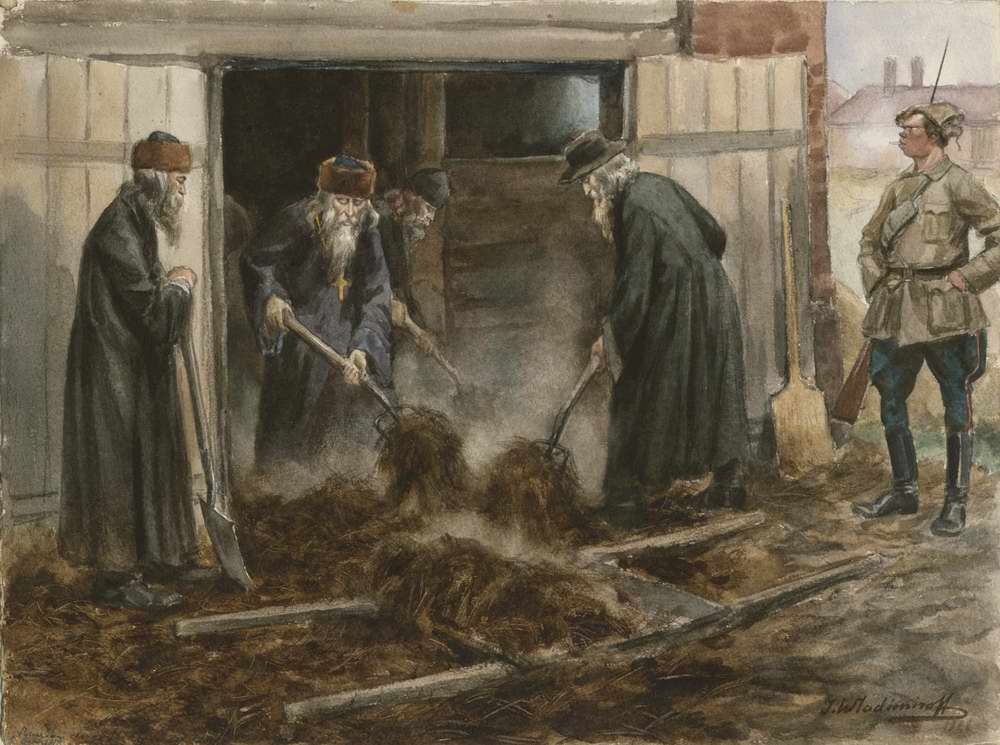
Clergy on forced labor, by Ivan Vladimirov

During the Civil War (1917–21), the Bolsheviks adopted War communism from June 1918 to March 1921, which entailed the breakup of the landed estates and the forcible seizure of agricultural surpluses. In the cities there were intense food shortages and a breakdown in the money system (at the time many Bolsheviks argued that ending money's role as a transmitter of "value" was a sign of the rapidly approaching communist epoch). Many city dwellers fled to the countryside – often to tend the land that the Bolshevik breakup of the landed estates had transferred to the peasants. Even small scale "capitalist" production was suppressed.

The Kronstadt rebellion signaled the growing unpopularity of War Communism in the countryside: in March 1921, at the end of the civil war, disillusioned sailors, primarily peasants who initially had been stalwart supporters of the Bolsheviks, revolted against the economic failures of the new regime. The Red Army, commanded by Lev Trotsky, crossed the ice over the frozen Baltic Sea to quickly crush the rebellion. This sign of growing discontent forced the party to foster a broad alliance of the working class and peasantry (80% of the population), despite left factions of the party which favored a regime solely representative of the interests of the revolutionary proletariat.

As millions died of starvation, Communist officials were paralyzed by the Russian famine of 1921–22 because they could not blame it on the usual enemies. Food was purchased abroad but it all went to cities, not to peasants. Eventually Herbert Hoover's offer of $62 million worth of American food and $8 million in medicine was accepted, feeding up to 11 million people. Other outside agencies fed another three million.

== New Economic Policy ==
Silver Rubel 1924

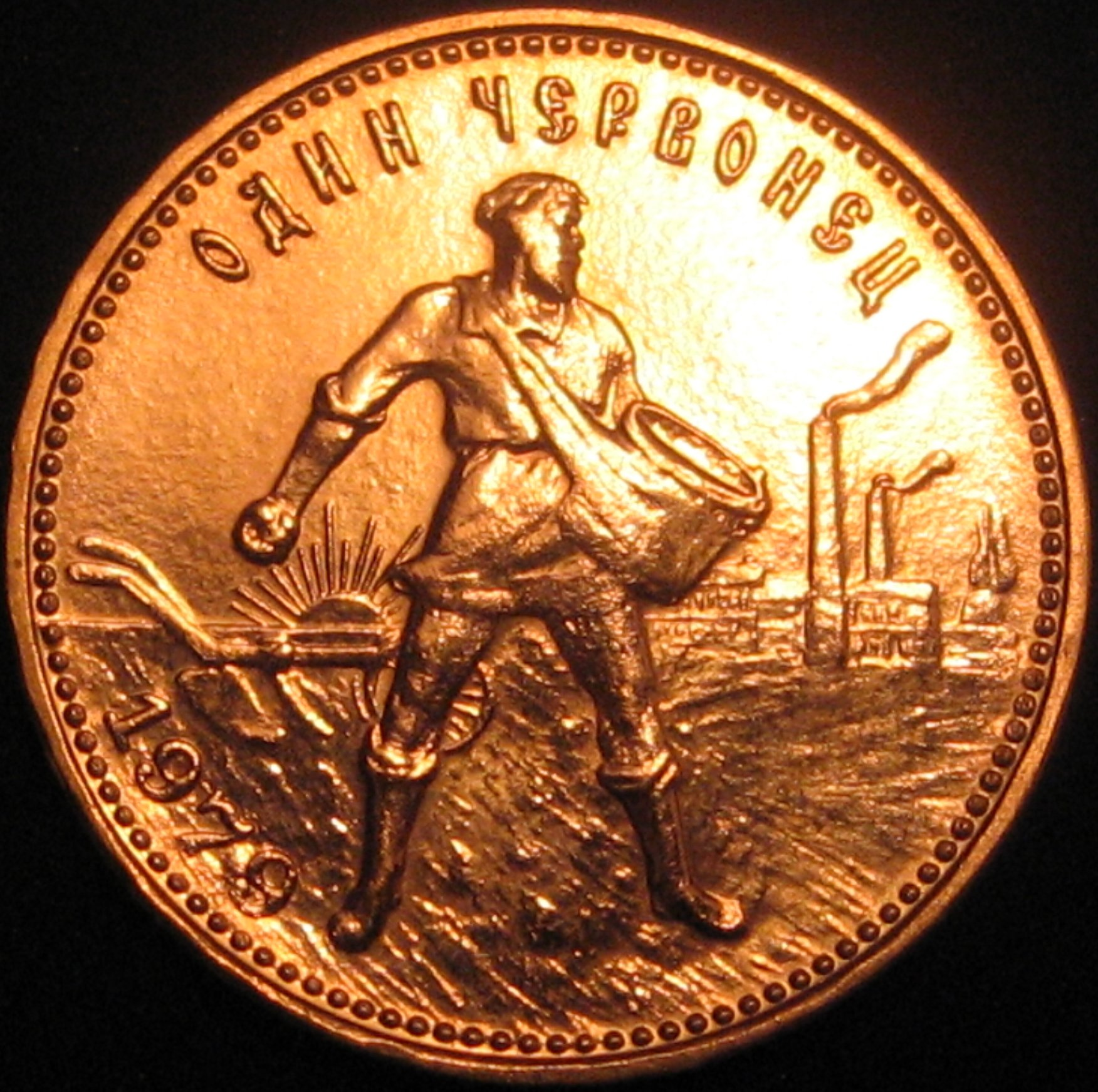
Gold Chervonetz (1979)

At the Tenth Party Congress in March 1921, it was decided to end War Communism and institute the New Economic Policy (NEP), in which the state allowed a limited market to exist. Small private businesses were allowed and restrictions on political activity were somewhat eased.

However, the key shift involved the status of agricultural surpluses. Rather than simply requisitioning agricultural surpluses in order to feed the urban population (the hallmark of War Communism), the NEP allowed peasants to sell their surplus yields on the open market. Meanwhile, the state still maintained state ownership of what Lenin deemed the "commanding heights" of the economy: heavy industry such as the coal, iron, and metallurgical sectors along with the banking and financial components of the economy. The "commanding heights" employed the majority of the workers in the urban areas. Under the NEP, such state industries would be largely free to make their own economic decisions.

In the cities and between the cities and the countryside, the NEP period saw a huge expansion of trade in the hands of full-time merchants – who were typically denounced as "speculators" by the leftists and also often resented by the public. The growth in trade, though, did generally coincide with rising living standards in both the city and the countryside (around 80% of Soviet citizens were in the countryside at this point).

Factories, badly damaged by civil war and capital depreciation, were far less productive. In addition, the organization of enterprises into trusts or syndicates representing one particular sector of the economy would contribute to imbalances between supply and demand associated with monopolies. Due to the lack of incentives brought by market competition, and with little or no state controls on their internal policies, trusts were likely to sell their products at higher prices.

The slower recovery of industry would pose some problems for the peasantry, who accounted for 80% of the population. Since agriculture was relatively more productive, relative price indexes for industrial goods were higher than those of agricultural products. The outcome of this was what Trotsky deemed the "Scissors Crisis" because of the scissors-like shape of the graph representing shifts in relative price indexes. Simply put, peasants would have to produce more grain to purchase consumer goods from the urban areas. As a result, some peasants withheld agricultural surpluses in anticipation of higher prices, thus contributing to mild shortages in the cities. This, of course, is speculative market behavior, which was frowned upon by many Communist Party cadres, who considered it to be exploitative of urban consumers.

In the meantime, the party took constructive steps to offset the crisis, attempting to bring down prices for manufactured goods and stabilize inflation, by imposing price controls on essential industrial goods and breaking-up the trusts in order to increase economic efficiency.

== Death of Lenin and the fate of the NEP ==
Following Lenin's third stroke, a troika made up of Joseph Stalin, Grigory Zinoviev and Lev Kamenev emerged to take day to day leadership of the Communist Party of the Soviet Union and the country and try to block Trotsky from taking power. Lenin, however, had become increasingly anxious about Stalin and, following his December 1922 stroke, dictated a letter (known as Lenin's Testament) to the party criticizing Stalin and urging his removal as General Secretary, a position which was starting to arise as the most powerful in the party. Stalin was aware of Lenin's Testament and acted to keep Lenin in isolation for health reasons and increase his control over the party apparatus.

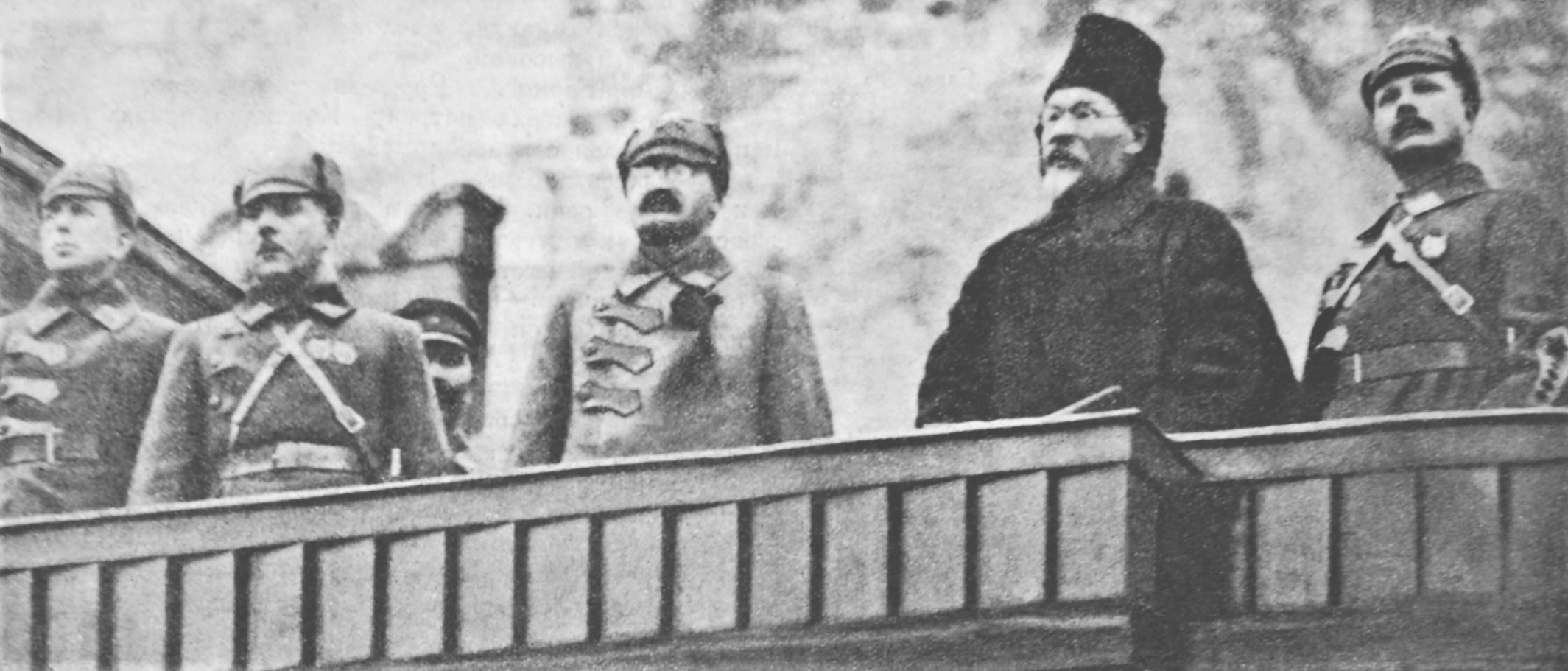
From left, Andrei Bubnov, Klim Voroshilov, Leon Trotsky, Mikhail Kalinin and Mikhail Frunze attend October Revolution Day parade on the Red Square in Moscow on 7 November 1924. Leon Trotsky attends the last time as the People's Commissar for Military and Naval Affairs.

Zinoviev and Nikolai Bukharin became concerned about Stalin's increasing power and proposed that the Orgburo which Stalin headed be abolished and that Zinoviev and Trotsky be added to the party secretariat thus diminishing Stalin's role as general secretary. Stalin reacted furiously and the Orgburo was retained but Bukharin, Trotsky and Zinoviev were added to the body.

Due to growing political differences with Trotsky and his Left Opposition in the fall of 1923, the troika of Stalin, Zinoviev and Kamenev reunited. At the Twelfth Party Congress in 1923, Trotsky failed to use Lenin's Testament as a tool against Stalin for fear of endangering the stability of the party.

Lenin died in January 1924 and in May his Testament was read aloud at the Central Committee but Zinoviev and Kamenev argued that Lenin's objections had proven groundless and that Stalin should remain General Secretary. The Central Committee decided not to publish the testament.

Meanwhile, the campaign against Trotsky intensified and he was removed from the position of People's Commissar of War before the end of the year. In 1925, Trotsky was denounced for his essay Lessons of October, which criticized Zinoviev and Kamenev for initially opposing Lenin's plans for an insurrection in 1917. Trotsky was also denounced for his theory of permanent revolution which contradicted Stalin's position that socialism could be built in one country, Russia, without a worldwide revolution. As the prospects for a revolution in Europe, particularly Germany, became increasingly dim through the 1920s, Trotsky's theoretical position began to look increasingly pessimistic as far as the success of Russian socialism was concerned.

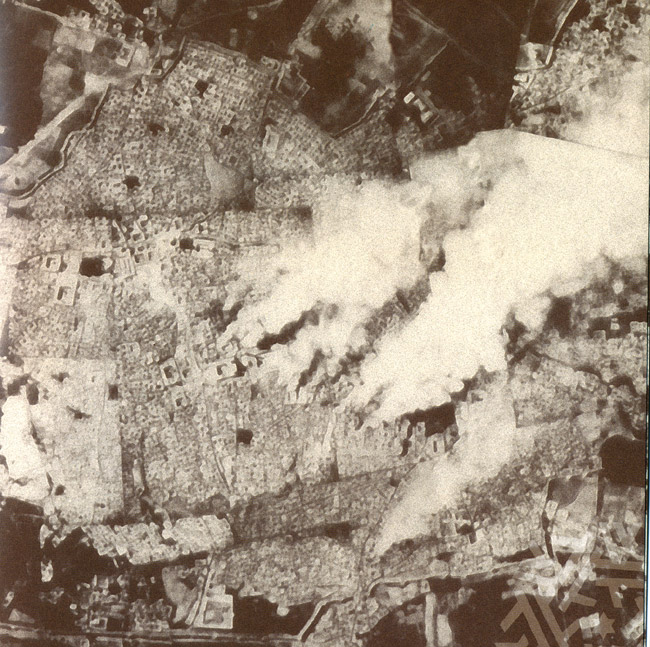
Bukhara burning under siege by Red Army troops during the Bukhara operation, 1 September 1920

In 1925, the Soviet Union occupied the island of Urtatagai, which was considered Afghan territory at the time, due to the island being used as a base to start border raids by the Basmachi movement. In 1926, the Soviet Union withdrew from the island after the Kingdom of Afghanistan agreed to restrain the Basmachi.

With the resignation of Trotsky as People's Commissar for Military and Naval Affairs, the unity of the troika began to unravel. Zinoviev and Kamenev again began to fear Stalin's power and felt that their positions were threatened. Stalin moved to form an alliance with Bukharin and his allies on the right of the party who supported the New Economic Policy and encouraged a slowdown in industrialization efforts and a move towards encouraging the peasants to increase production via market incentives. Zinoviev and Kamenev criticized this policy as a return to capitalism. The conflict erupted at the Fourteenth Party Congress held in December 1925 with Zinoviev and Kamenev now protesting against the dictatorial policies of Stalin and trying to revive the issue of Lenin's Testament which they had previously buried. Stalin now used Trotsky's previous criticisms of Zinoviev and Kamenev to defeat and demote them and bring in allies like Vyacheslav Molotov, Kliment Voroshilov and Mikhail Kalinin. Trotsky was dropped from the politburo entirely in 1926. The Fourteenth Congress also saw the first developments of the Stalin's cult of personality with him being referred to as "leader" for the first time and becoming the subject of effusive praise from delegates.

Trotsky, Zinoviev and Kamenev formed a United Opposition against the policies of Stalin and Bukharin in 1926, but they had lost influence as a result of the inner party disputes and in October 1927, Trotsky, Zinoviev and Kamenev were expelled from the Central Committee. In November 1927, shortly after the tenth anniversary of the October Revolution and weeks prior to the Fifteenth Party Congress, Trotsky and Zinoviev were expelled from the Communist Party itself as Stalin sought to deny the Opposition opportunity to make their struggle public. By the time that the Congress finally convened in December 1927, Kamenev spoke for the Opposition at the Congress due to Trotsky's and Zinoviev's expulsion. Just prior to Congress, Zinoviev had capitulated to Stalin and denounced his previous adherence to the opposition as "anti-Leninist" and the few remaining members still loyal to the opposition were subjected to insults and humiliations. Kamenev's speeches were heavily booed, and the Congress made Opposition views "incompatible" with Communist Party membership, which saw Kamenev and Oppositionists banned from the party. Kamenev then capitulated, and he and Zinoviev were allowed back into the Communist Party in June 1928 after a six–month cooling off period. In January 1928, Trotsky and other leading members of the Left Opposition who refused to capitulate had been sentenced to internal exile.

A few months later in 1928, Stalin moved against Bukharin by appropriating Trotsky's criticisms of his right wing policies and he promoted a new general line of the party favoring collectivization of the peasantry and rapid industrialization, forcing Bukharin and his supporters into the Right Opposition.

At the Central Committee meeting held in July 1928, Bukharin and his supporters argued that Stalin's new policies would cause a breach with the peasantry. Bukharin also alluded to Lenin's Testament. While he had support from the party organization in Moscow and the leadership of several commissariats, Stalin's control of the secretariat was decisive in that it allowed Stalin to manipulate elections to party posts throughout the country, giving him control over a large section of the Central Committee. The Right Opposition was defeated and Bukharin tried again to join forces with Kamenev and Zinoviev but it was too late.

== Nationalities ==
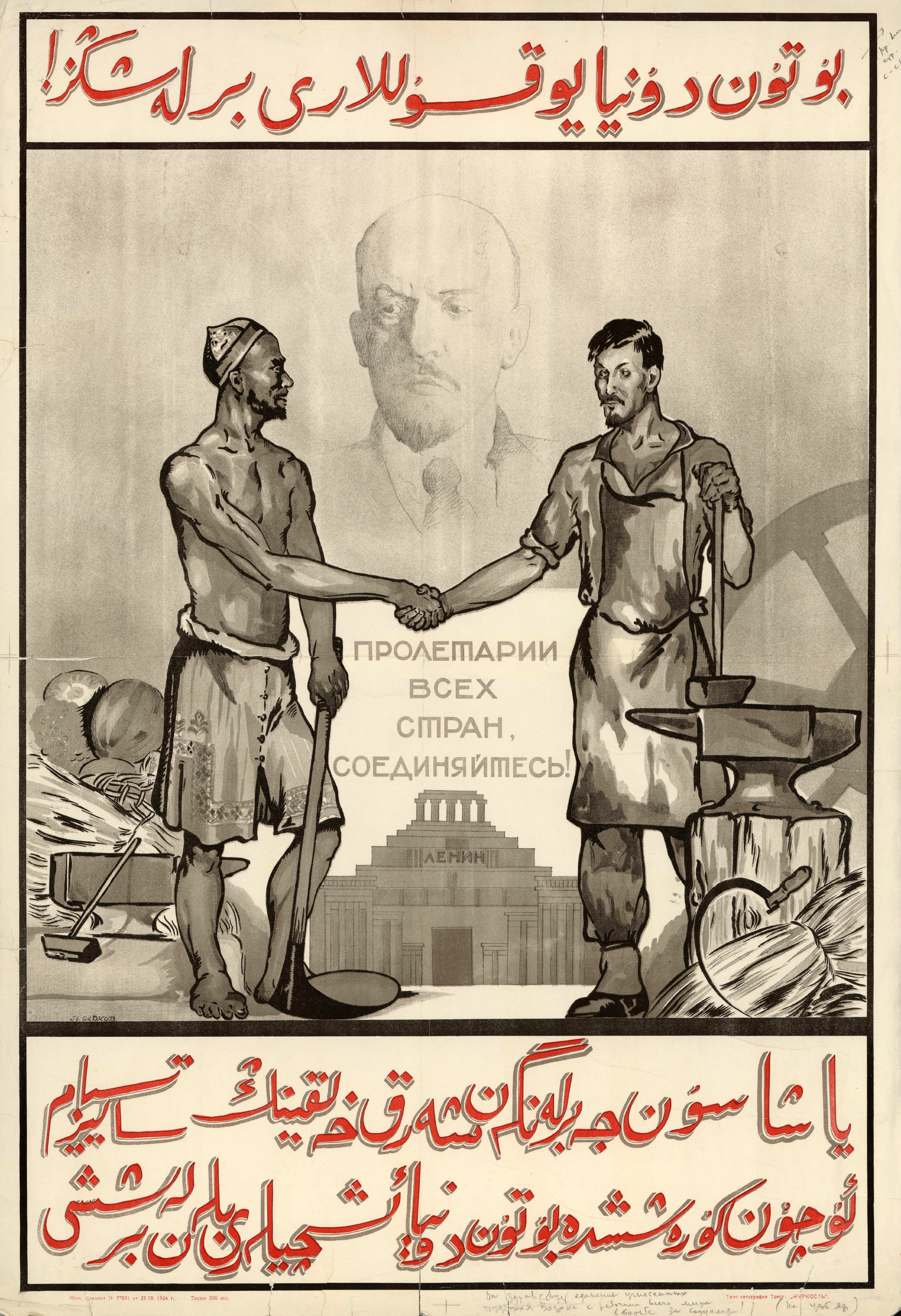
"Long live the unity of the oppressed labourers of the East with the workers of all the world in the struggle for the socialism!", a 1924 poster in Uzbek language

The Russian Empire comprised a multitude of nationalities, languages, ethnic groups and religions. The spirit of nationalism, so strong in 19th century Europe, was significant in Russia, Ukraine, and Finland especially before 1900. Much later the spirit of nationalism appeared in central Asia, especially among the Muslim population. The Bolsheviks made use of the slogan "Self-determination" to fight imperialism and to build support among non-Russian nationalities. Lenin's position was that after the revolution all nationalities would be free to choose, either to become part of Soviet Russia or become independent. Left-wing Bolsheviks, most notably Georgy Pyatakov, derided nationalism as a false consciousness that was much less important than class conflict, and would disappear with the victory of socialism.

Lenin's views prevailed, and were supported by Stalin, who became the Party's specialist on nationalities. The "Declaration of the Rights of the Peoples of Russia", issued 15 November 1917, left the new Soviet state with undefined boundaries, and invited of other nations to join in. The "Declaration of the Rights of the Toiling and Exploited People", issued in January 1918, announced that all nationalities would have the right to determine on what basis they would participate in the federal government of the new state. A new agency was set up, the People's Commissariat for Nationalities (NARKOMNATS) based in Moscow. It operated from 1918 to 1924 and had responsibility for 22 percent of the entire Soviet population. It was led by Stalin and settled boundary disputes as it set up autonomous regions for non-Russian peoples. It established newspapers in the local languages and fostered literacy. It took a paternalistic view toward "backward" or "primitive peoples". Soviet anthropology and ethnography specialized in understanding these people. Evkom was the Jewish Commissariat; Muskom was the Muslim Commissariat.

== See also ==
- Foreign relations of the Soviet Union
- History of Russia
- Timeline of Russian history
- Historiography in the Soviet Union
- Leninism
- Politics of the Soviet Union
- Political repression in the Soviet Union
