= Committees of Poor Peasants =

Russian Civil War

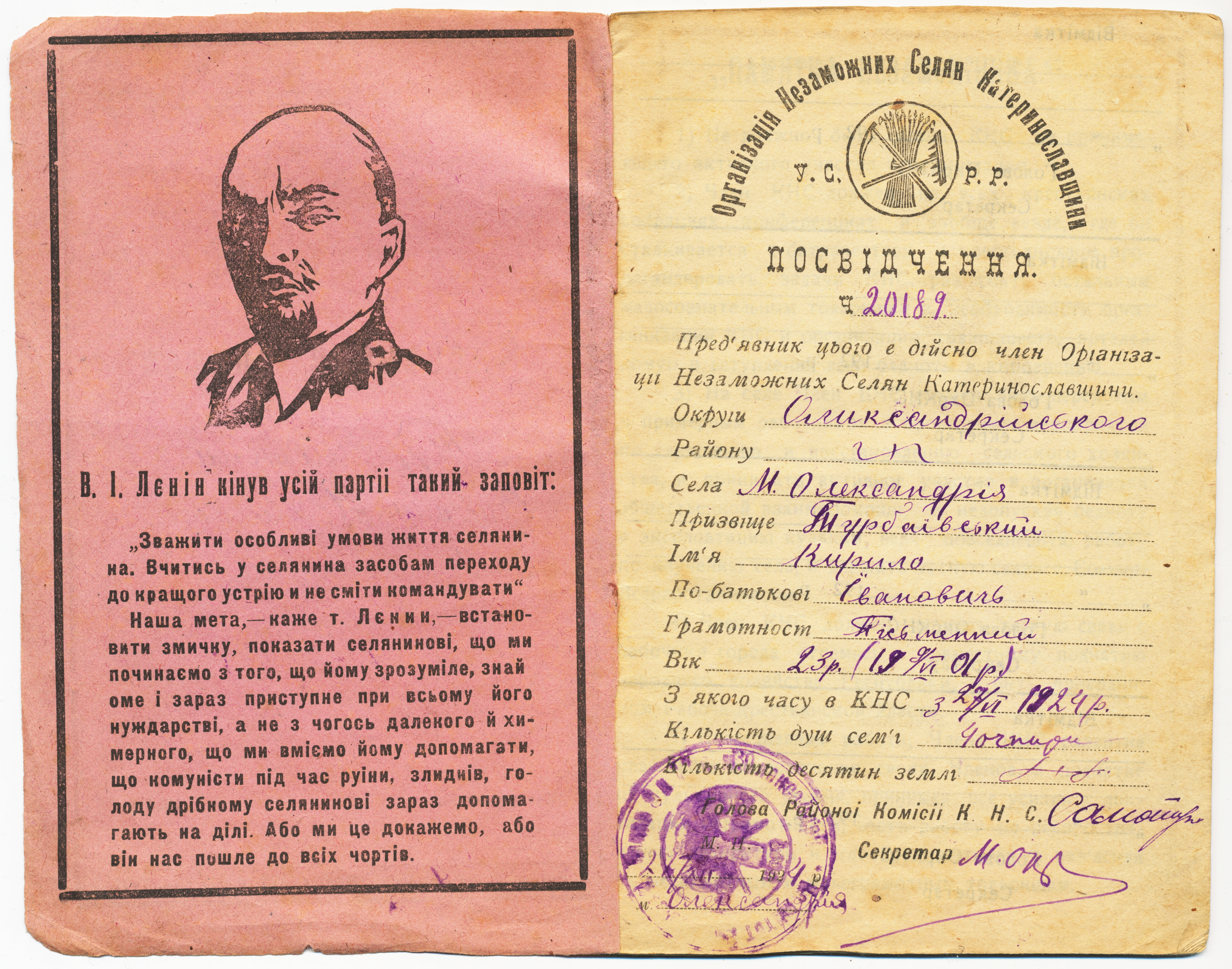
Membership card of the organization of the unwealthy peasants Katerynoslavshchyna Oleksandriia district, 1924 (for Kyrylo Ivanovych Turbaivskyi)

In Soviet-ruled Russia the Bolshevik authorities established Committees of Poor [Peasants] (Russian: Комитеты Бедноты, komitety bednoty or Russian: комбеды, kombedy, commonly rendered in English as kombeds) during the second half of 1918 as local institutions bringing together impoverished peasants to advance government policy. The committees had as their primary task grain requisitioning on behalf of the Soviet state; they also distributed manufactured goods in rural areas. After 1918 many of the Committees of Poor Peasants were disbanded, though they remained strong in some areas including Ukraine where they were known as Committees of Unwealthy Peasants (komnezam or komnezamozhi).

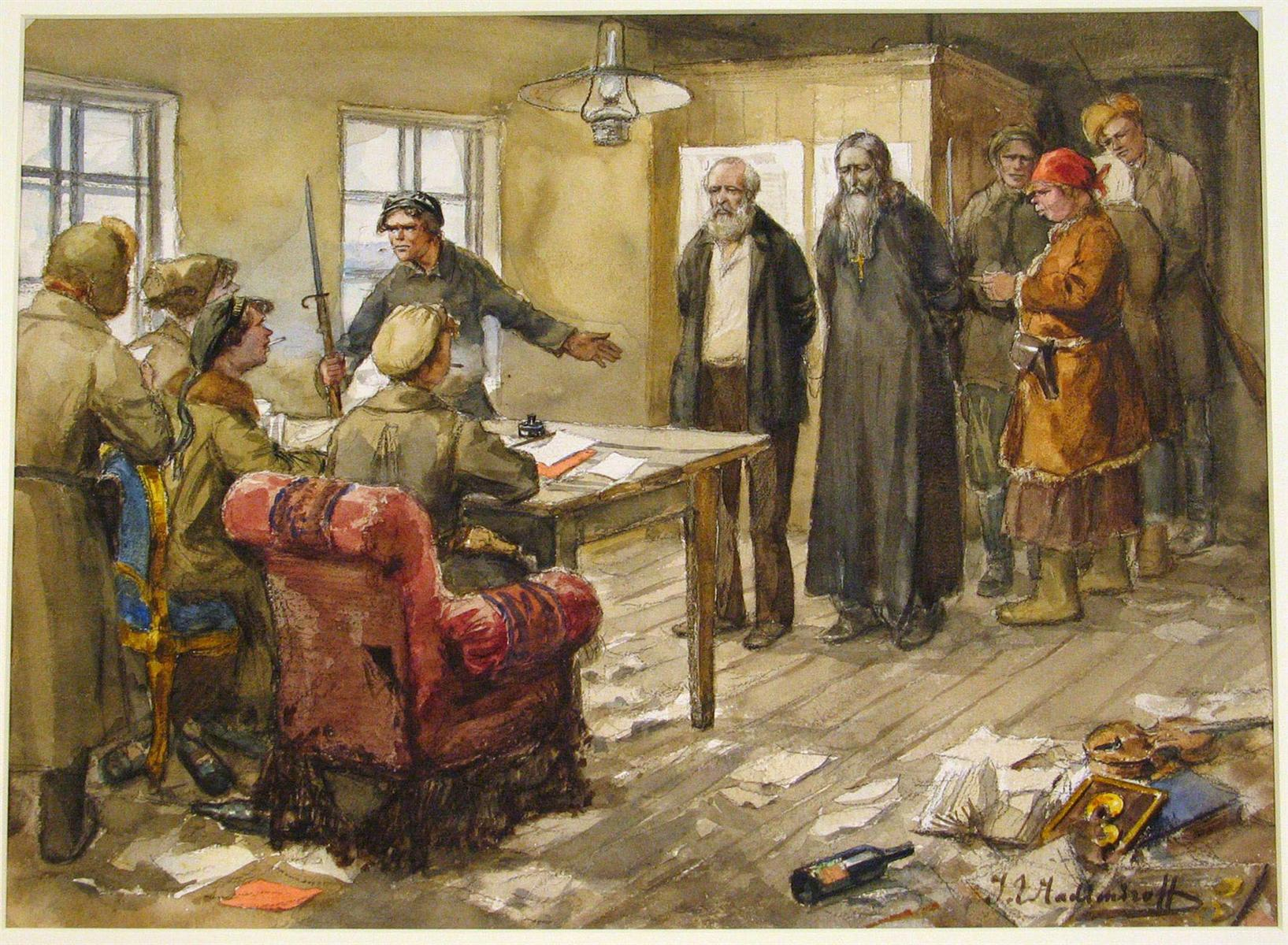
Painting by Ivan Vladimirov. "Interrogation in the Committee of Poor Peasants"

== Institutional history ==
=== Establishment ===
By the spring of 1918, a situation of chronic food shortage existed in the cities of Soviet Russia and urban manufacturing threatened to grind to a halt. Local village assemblies were insufficient to the task of gathering foodstuffs for the cities, a crisis which the Bolsheviks attributed to the domination of local government by wealthy opponents of the new regime.

A new "class war" was desired in the village to empower the rural poor in support of the Soviet regime. According to Bolshevik doctrine, the Russian peasantry was divided into three categories: poor peasants (bednyaks), individuals who were forced to sell their labor to others to survive and were thus regarded as natural allies of the new Soviet regime; "middle" peasants (serednyaks), who conducted farming operations on their own land with their own labor; and wealthy peasants (kulaks), who profited through the hired labor of others.

On June 11, 1918, the People's Commissariat for Food Supplies (Narkomprod) of Soviet Russia was instructed by the All-Russian Central Executive Committee of the Congress of Soviets to establish a new institution to assist it in gathering foodstuffs for the country's hungry cities, the Committees of Poor Peasants.

Membership in these kombeds was to be denied to all wealthy peasants as well as to those who hired labor or held surplus grain.

The kombeds were given the task of helping to locate and confiscate surplus grain from other peasants of that same village. The groups were also placed in charge of the distribution of food, manufactured commodities, and those limited agricultural implements that were available to the members of the village. This activity inevitably brought the members of the kombed into conflict with others in the village from whom grain was taken.

=== Nature ===
In the view of many experts, the kombeds were doomed by a poor understanding of the true essence of the soviet peasantry. In the view of historian Orlando Figes:

"Most villages thought of themselves as farming communities of equal members related by kin—they often called themselves a 'peasant family'—and as such were hostile to the idea of a separate body for the poor. They either failed to elect a kombed, leaving it to outside agitators, or else set up one which every peasant joined on the grounds that all the villagers were poor. ... The poor peasants were simply not aware of themselves as 'proletarians'. They all thought of themselves as fellow villagers and looked at the efforts of the Bolsheviks to split them with suspicion and hostility.

"Consequently, most of the kombedy were set up by elements from outside the commune. These were not the poor peasant farmers but immigrant townsmen and soldiers, landless craftsmen, and laborers excluded from the land commune. ... Disconnected from the peasant commune, upon which all rural government depended, they were unable to carry out their tasks without resort to violence. They requisitioned private property, made illegal arrests, vandalized churches, and generally terrorized the peasants. It was more like a local mafia than an organ of the Soviet state."

Figes notes that many members of these kombeds were quick to resort to such brutality in the "desperate struggle to procure foodstuffs and military supplies" and that they sometimes were a means for local officials to "operate networks of corruption and extortion from the peasantry."

The vast majority of members of the Committees of Poor Peasants were not affiliated with the Communist Party, with a majority categorized as "non-Party" individuals and a small minority listed in official records as "sympathetic" to the party. Most were supportive of the 1917 revolution, however, and many saw themselves as "true representatives of the people's government" and sought to carry out their assigned duties loyally.

=== Disestablishment and legacy ===
In the fall of 1918, the need of the Soviet state to forge closer relations with the peasantry in the face of the Russian Civil War and a desire to eliminate the emerging "dual power" in each village between kombed and village soviet led to pressure for the abolition of the kombeds and the transfer of their functions to the village soviets.

In addition to alienating the overwhelming masses of the peasantry from the Soviet state through their often abusive methods of grain seizure, the kombeds additionally came to be seen as an institution which usurped the authority of the regular institutions of soviet government, the village soviets.

On December 2, 1918, the All-Russian Central Executive Committee of Soviets decreed the amalgamation of the kombeds with the village soviets. The kombeds were thereby effectively eliminated in Russia by late in the spring of 1919. In Ukraine kombeds existed until after the NEP.

Although their establishment was brief, lasting less than a year, the number of kombeds established in Soviet Russia was vast and their influence in 1918–1919 was pervasive. According to Soviet historian V.R. Garasimiuk, a total of 131,637 kombeds were established in the various provinces of Soviet Russia in this period.

== See also ==
- Soviet forced grain requisitioning (Prodrazvyorstka)
- Russian Civil War
