= Central Black Earth Economic Region =

Economic region of Russia

Central Black Earth Economic Region Центрально-Чернозёмный экономический район (Russian)
- Economic region
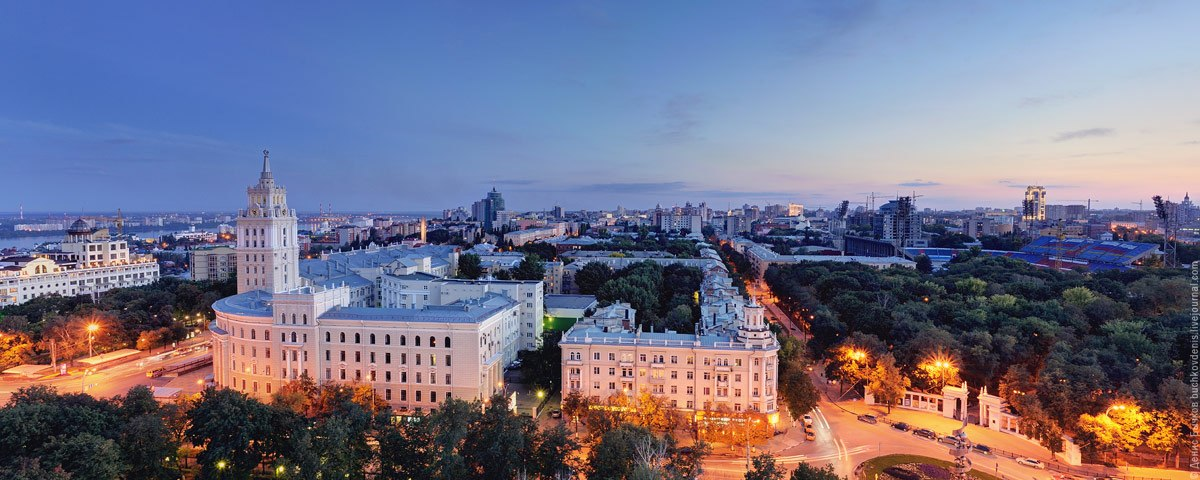
- Voronezh, the largest city in the region

- Map of Central Black Earth economic region
- Country: Russia

Area
  - Total: 166,200 km^{2} (64,200 sq mi)

Population (2021)
  - Total: 7,057,951
  - Density: 42.47/km^{2} (110.0/sq mi)

GDP
  - Total: ₽ 4,566 billion US$ 62.098 billion (2021)

The Central Black Earth Economic Region or the Central-Chernozem Economic Region (Note: Russian: Центрально-Чернозёмный экономический район, romanized: Tsentral'no-Chernozyomnyy ekonomicheskiy rayon, IPA: [tsɨnˈtralʲnə tɕɪrnɐˈzʲɵmnɨj ɪkənɐˈmʲitɕɪskʲɪj rɐˈjon]) is one of 12 economic regions of Russia. This region accounted for almost 3% of the national GRP in 2008.

== Composition ==
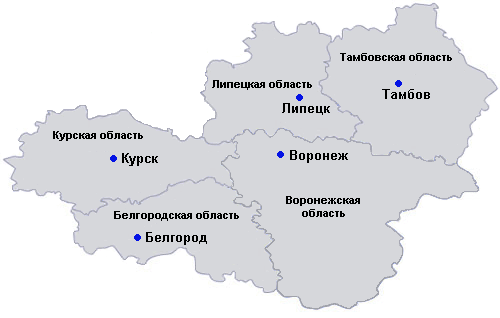
Map of the Central Black Earth Economic Region oblasts

- Belgorod Oblast
- Kursk Oblast
- Lipetsk Oblast
- Tambov Oblast
- Voronezh Oblast

All are in the Central Federal District.

== See also ==
- Central Agricultural Zone (Russia)
