= Central Agricultural Zone (Russia) =

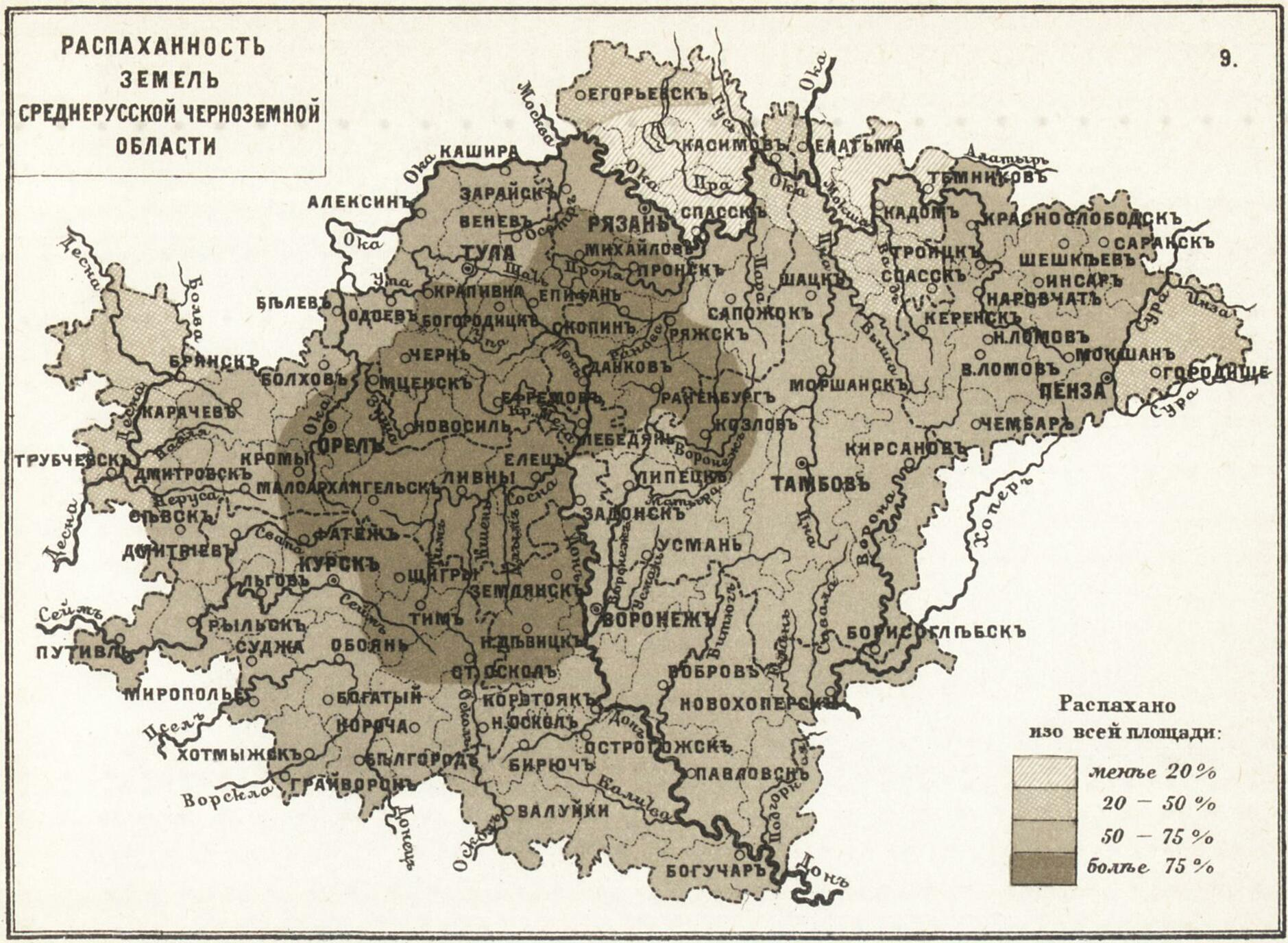
1902 map of land yields in the oblasts of Central Russia, rich in chernozem.

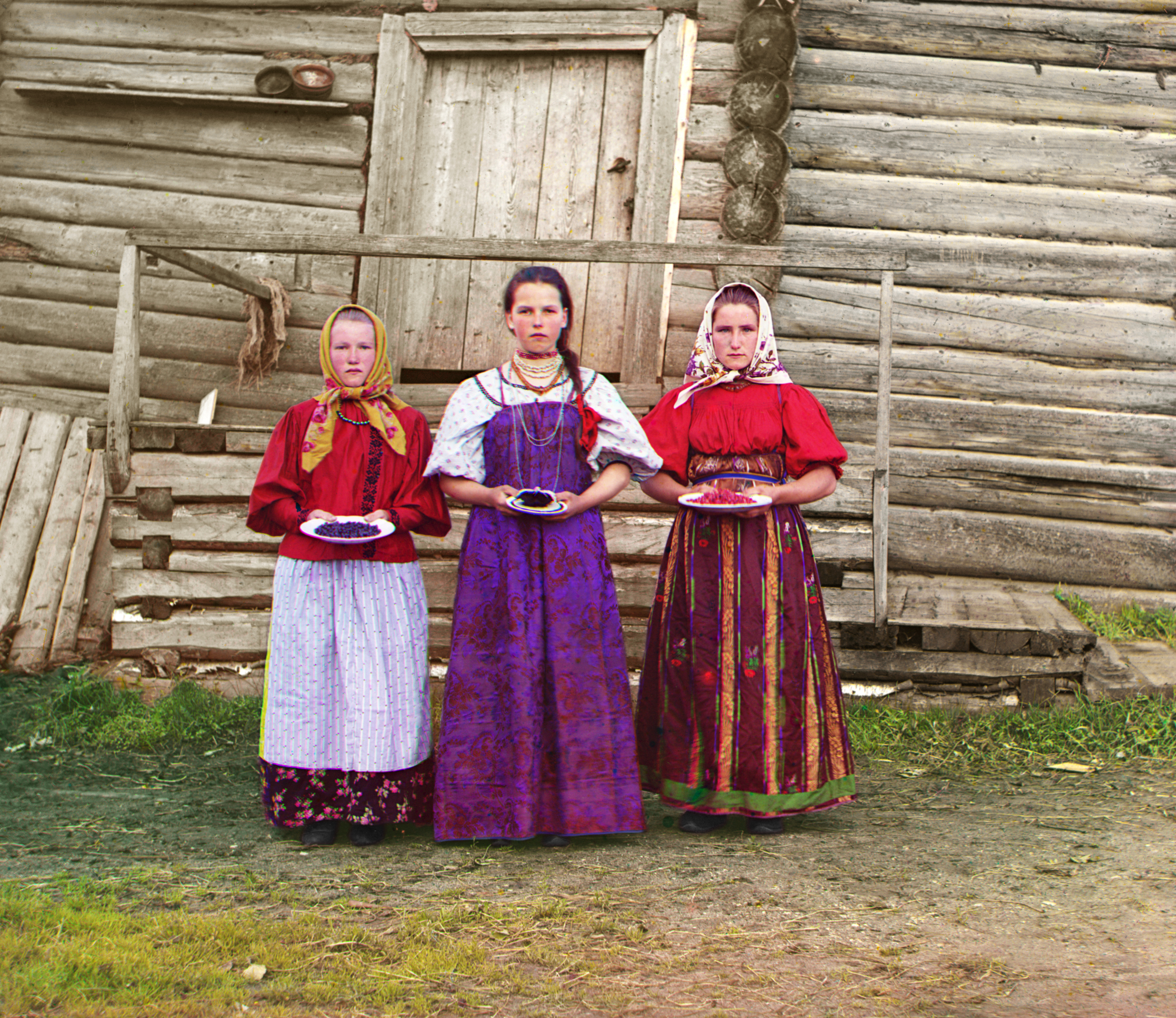
Young peasant women offer berries to visitors to their izba home on the Sheksna River, near the town of Kirillov, 1909. Photograph by Sergey Prokudin-Gorsky.

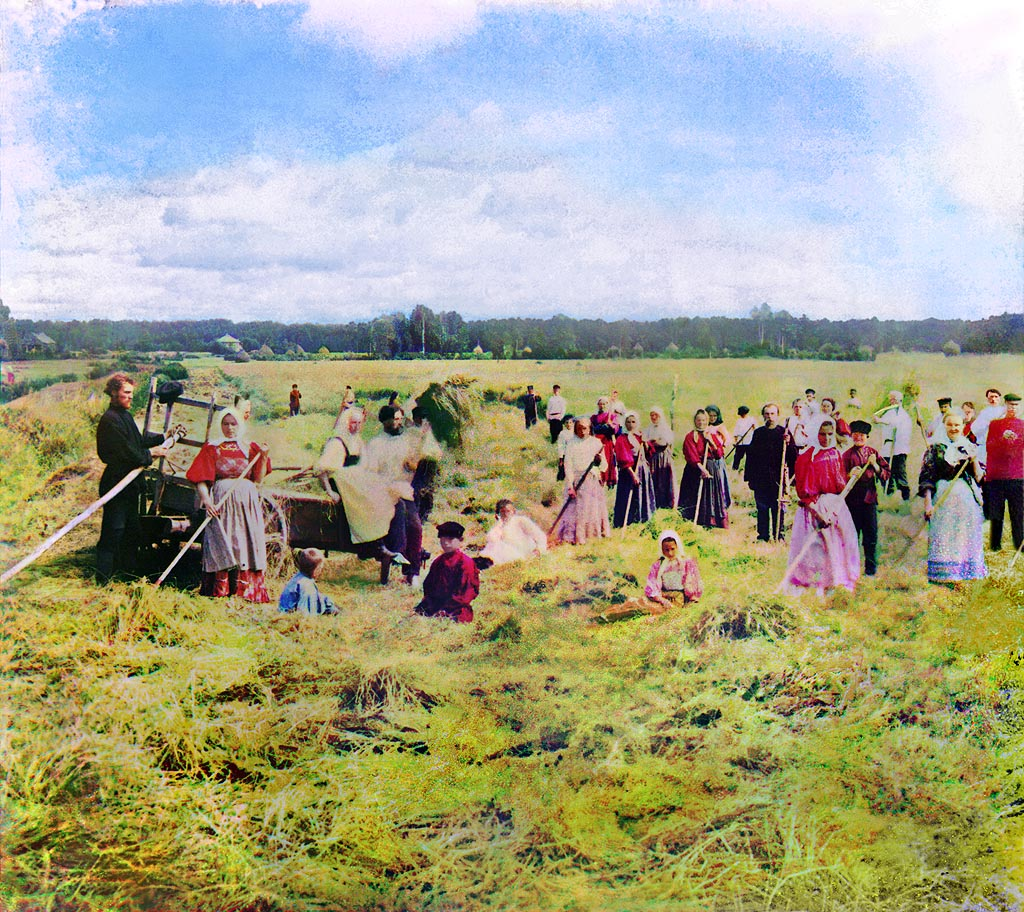
Haymaking in Yaroslavl Governorate, 1909. Photograph by Sergey Prokudin-Gorsky

The Central Agricultural Zone is a traditional region of Russia. Historically it was the centre of agriculture and colonisation in the seventeenth and eighteenth centuries, and was one the most densely populated area of the Russian Empire. It was also the poorest. Before the emancipation of serfs, it was home to most of the Russian serf population, and later it was also the centre of the communal system, which contributed to the areas relative poverty compared to the rest of Russia.

During the revolutionary years it was the centre of most agrarian violence, and later the centre of the Red Movement and Red Army during the Russian Revolution.

In 1960, Jerome Blum defined the Central Agricultural Zone as:

- Oryol (Orel), Tula, Ryazan, Tambov, Voronezh, and Kursk Oblast.

By contrast, he identified the Central Industrial Zone as:

- Moscow, Tver, Yaroslavl, Kostroma, Nizhny Novgorod (Nizhegorod, Gorky), Vladimir, Smolensk, and Kaluga Oblast.

In The Economic Organization of War Communism (1985), Silvana Malle stated: "The Central Agricultural Regions include Briansk, Voronezh, Kaluga, Kursk, Orel, Penza, Riazan, Tambov, and Tula."

== Overview ==
The Central Agricultural Zone was marked by lower living standards for peasants, and an extremely dense and poor rural population. It was surrounded by areas where commercial farming was prevalent: in the Baltic were capitalist farms able to hire wage-labour due to the Emancipation in 1817 with access to Western grain markets, in Western Ukraine nobles had established vast sugar-beet farms, in the fertile south of Russia, the Kuban and northern Caucasus ("New Russia", where there were fertile virgin lands with little population) there existed a 'wealthy stratum of mixed farmers' coming out of the peasantry and the Cossacks, and in Western Siberia where the Trans-Siberian Railroad had enabled smallholders to make a fortune producing dairy products and cereals for the larger market. These regions accounted for the general increase of peasant purchasing power (and living standards) noted in the Russian peasantry in the turn of the century and early twentieth century; there was however a growing divergence in the peasants' economic situation evolving between these relatively wealthy western, southern and eastern areas, and the central agricultural zone, where most of the estates of the gentry were located, where backward and old farming techniques and methods dominated, and which became increasingly overpopulated. Here the amount of land per capita was rapidly decreasing, while the population boom surpassed the increase in agricultural production. It was also one of the centres of 'hemp culture', i.e. the cultivation of hemp.

The Central Agricultural Zone in 1856, at the time the 'chief granary' of the Empire, was also the area where the gentry were most indebted: 71,3 percent of their revision souls were mortgaged. The difference between the price of populated and unpopulated land was also less in this region than in non-agricultural regions, such as the Lake region, and land was more expensive in the central agricultural region because landowners realised more rent here than in these other regions. This also led to serfs being cheaper in these areas, as the main income of the gentry came from renting out land, and less came from serf labour; therefore to landowners in the central agricultural zone, land was considered more valuable than the serfs they owned.

These areas had few signs of commercialism, and the market economy remained weak. Most peasants were involved in a 'natural system of production', selling winter produce and handicraft to pay taxes and buy some new goods for the household, with the general production being geared towards their own food production. In Tambov Province, in the central agricultural zone, a survey conducted by zemstvo authorities in the 1880s found that two out of three peasant households could not feed themselves without also simultaneously going into debt; this was made worse by the fact that peasant farmers had to sell off grain in autumn, when prices were low due to high supply, and buy grain in the spring at double the prices – often to the same kulaks, usurers who could have whole villages indebted, often leaving peasants in need to sell parts of their lands off to pay off their debts.

The differences in wealth and living standards of the peasantry between the central agricultural region and the surrounding agricultural areas were rooted in two factors, that is 'local differences in the quality of the soil', and 'historic legacies stretching back to the days of serfdom'. Villages composed of former serfs were also less rich in land than those consisting of 'state peasants', i.e. peasants settled on land owned by the state. Orlando Figes cites the basic problem of the central agricultural zone being that 'the peasantry's egalitarian customs gave them little incentive to produce anything other than babies'; the birth rate in Russia at the second half of the 1800s were almost twice that of the European average, at about 50 to a 1000, with the highest rates in the lands with communal tenure, where the size of the family determined the size of land. This population boom were due to land shortage: the population density of Central Russia matched Western Europe, with the average peasant allotment similar in size to those in Germany and France (at about 2,6 desyatina, roughly 1,1 hectare in 1900), but with only half the grain yield; this sharp difference from the rest of Europe was caused by the heavily outdated methods used by the Russian peasants in Central Russia: instead of the heavy iron plough low pulled by four to six horses in Western Europe, central Russian farmers often used a light wooden plough pulled by one horse or two oxen; they also used a small hand-sickle compared to the scythe or reaping hook which had been in use in Western Europe for over 50 years; sowing, winnowing and threshing was still done by hand compared to mechanised production in the rest of Europe; the use of chemical fertilisers were greatly below European standards; and advanced field rotations (alternative between cereals and root crops) were still largely unknown, while having been introduced in Western Europe in the mid-eighteenth century during the agricultural revolution. To feed themselves more land was cultivated as few peasants had the money to modernise their farms, and this was accomplished by reducing the amount of communal pasture lands in the three-field system, which had the effect of reducing the livestock size and therefore also the main source of fertiliser, and exhausting the soil. By the end of the century one in three households did not own a horse, and had to either rent one or attach it to themselves and pull the plow themselves.

The seed of further conflict in the central agricultural zone was found in the 'most tempting solution' of the peasantry's land hunger, which they could see every day from their villages: the estates of the squires, with nobles owning one third of all arable land in Russia in the 1870s. By 1905 this number was 22 percent, mainly due to the peasant communes' buying up land, increasing the percentage of peasant landownership to 68 per cent from 58 in the same time-span. The need for more land to cultivate caused by the boom in peasant population also led to one-third of the gentry's land being rented out, often at extortionate prices, with peasants agreeing to high prices out of necessity; this made the rental values increase to seven times the size, and this gave income for the gentry of the late 1800s to live on.

An arc of provinces at the southern edge of the Central Agricultural Zone was where the agrarian violence – the peasants' war against the squires – of the revolution was concentrated, presenting a distinctive distribution: from Samara and Saratov, through Tambov, Voronezh, Kursk, Kharkov, Chernigov, Ekaterinoslav, Kherson and Poltava, all the way to Kiev and Podolia in the southwest. This 'transitional region' of overpopulation and large landownership by the gentry, with high land rents and low wages, but with fertile soil and decently long growing seasons favourable to the development of commercial mechanised farming and cultivation of wheat, sugar-beet, etc. were, according to Figes 2014, 'caught in the worst of all possible worlds: between the old pre-capitalist system of agriculture in the centre, and the emergent system of commercial farming at the periphery'. Though at extortionate prices, the leasing of land from the gentry managed most peasants to just about survive during the economic agricultural price depression between 1876 and 1896. As the price of cereals rose and the price of transportation fell, however, many landowners turned their estates into commercial farms, greatly increasing the share of landownership by the gentry between 1900 and 1914 (an increase of one third, but even higher in the 'transitional regions', like in Poltava Province where their share doubled). This resulted in rented out land being withdrawn, or rented out at even higher prices, and the lease system being altered from a money rent to labour rent (otrabotka), perceived by the peasants as a new form of serfdom. With a modernisation of their farms, the need for peasant labour also decreased, reducing wages in the process. Within the final decades of the Russian Empire, millions of peasants had been driven off the land due to poverty, or a misfortune like the death of a family member, which was very difficult to handle economically for a severely indebted household.

Saratov was one of the areas of where the communal system was dominant. Prime Minister Stolypin, who had been Marshal of the Kovno Nobility for thirteen years from 1889, was struck by the differences in peasant living standards and wealth between the Kovno region and Saratov Province where he was Governor from 1903. Stolypin whose wife O. B. Neidgardt owned an estate in Kovno Province, a Polish-Lithuanian province where the communal system had never been in place, where peasants owned farms privately, and with farming techniques like those in use in the neighbouring Kingdom of Prussia which were vastly superior to those used by communal tenures in Central Russia. Saratov Province on the other hand, albeit rich in land, was under the communal system, and its peasants were among the poorest and most rebellious in the entire Empire. Saratov was also the site of the most destruction of gentry property during the Russian peasant uprising of 1905–6, and it was from these events and this province Stolypin got his conviction confirmed, and which brought him to St. Petersburg with his agrarian reform whose cornerstone was the abolishing of the communal system and the establishing of a peasant landowning class. His reforms were resisted by the nobility, unionised as the United Nobility, and commune elders, which tended to be reactionary and dominant, resisting modernisation, and conflict arose between those wanting to separate and become private landowners and the communes; this can be seen in the life of Sergey Semyonov and his struggle against the commune elder Maliutin. Most peasants of Central Russia and the Central Agricultural Region, the communal area to which Stolypin's reforms had been addressed, were not affected, and the reform failed to alter the communal way of life.

== History ==
=== Colonisation ===
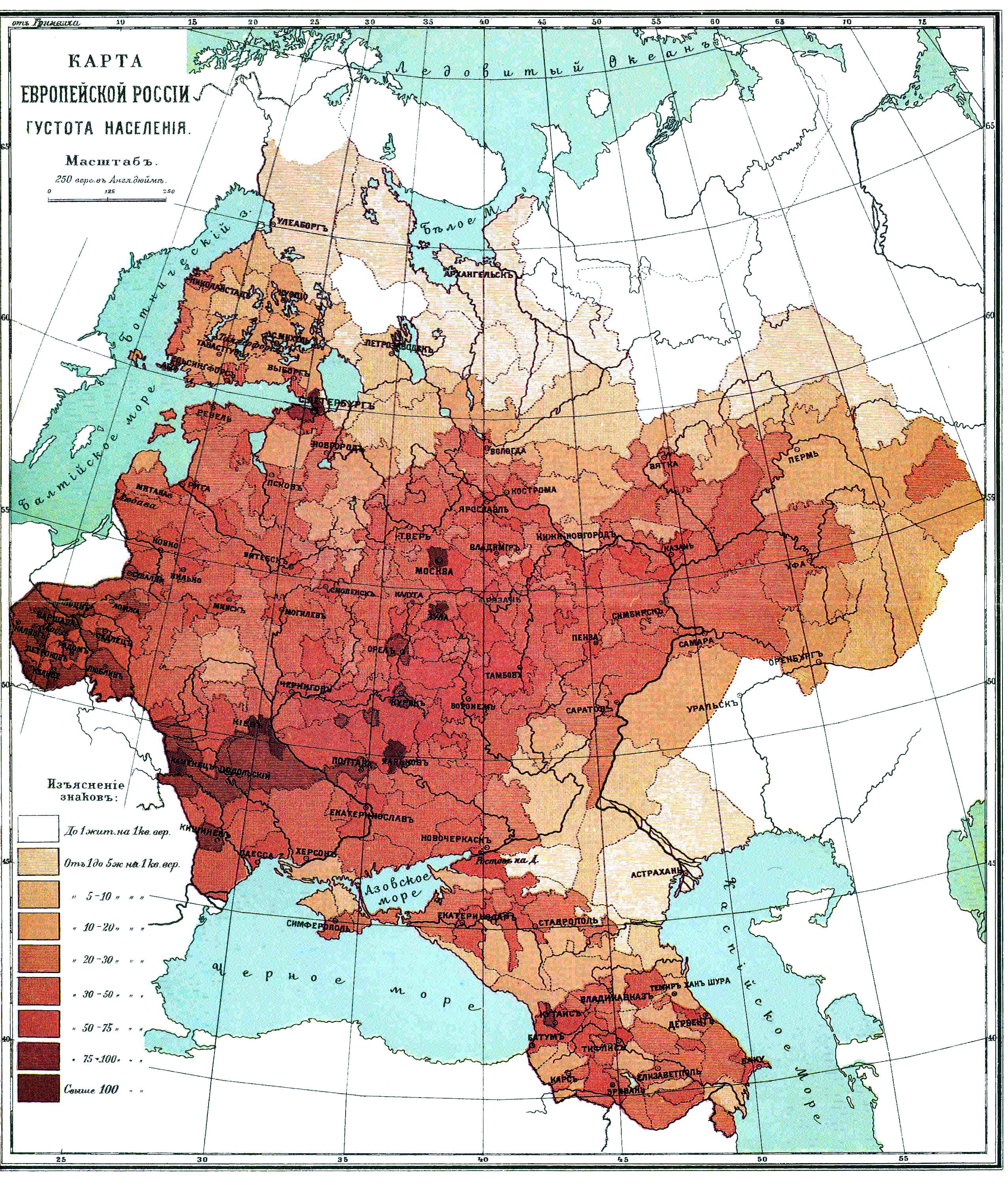
Population density map of the European part of the Russian Empire

The Central Agricultural Zone was the main area of colonisation in the seventeenth and eighteenth century. The centre of agricultural production moved to the region at the same time, and barschina emerged as principal peasant obligation. In these areas nearly 85 per cent of the serf population lived during the latter third of the seventeenth century. At the time of the Emancipation, the Central Agricultural Region was one of the areas, alongside the 'black earth governorates' where the nobility wanted to free the serfs with as little land as possible (or none), and were willing to free their serfs without indemnification (or even a small one) if they were able to keep all of or most of the land for themselves.

At the time of the Crimean War, the Russian Army was overstretched: it was an army consisting of peasants and serfs, and the relatively small population of European Russia compared to the rest of Europe (which was its size) was compounded by the fact that most of the serfs were located in the central agricultural zone, far from any border where they might be needed.

=== First World War ===
During the First World War the commercial farms and big estates were hit badly by the war as mobilisation left them without much of the needed hired labour, and who could not buy needed equipment due to the altered production during the war. This resulted in large portions of gentry land being rented out to the more economically sound peasants, as they were less hit by labour shortage as the government only drafted the excess peasant population, and who made their own simple tools. Therefore, the productive area of the peasantry in the central agricultural zone increased from 47 to 64 million desyatina (513 to 699 million hectares), while the estates productive area fell from 21 to 7 million (229 to 76,5 million hectares) in the same time-span, 1913–1916.

=== Revolution ===
The differences between the central agricultural zone and the wealthier periphery areas could be clearly seen during the Russian Revolution, when the strongholds of the revolution fell within the central agricultural zone, while the more wealthy agricultural regions on the periphery remained firm areas for the counter-revolution. During the Russian Constituent Assembly election of 1917, the Socialist Revolutionary Party gained 16 million votes (38 per cent of the total), where most of the votes came from peasants in the Central Agricultural Zone and Siberia.

== See also ==
- Central Black Earth economic region

== Bibliography ==
- Blum, Jerome (1960). "Russian Agriculture in the Last 150 Years of Serfdom". Agricultural History. 34 (1). Agricultural History Society: 3–12. ISSN 0002-1482. JSTOR 3740859.
- Blum, Jerome (1961). Lord and Peasant in Russia: From the Ninth to the Nineteenth Century. Princeton, New Jersey: Princeton University Press. p. 394. ISBN 0691007640. "Russian Central Agricultural Zone." See Lord and Peasant in Russia.
- Burbank, Jane; Von Hagen, Mark (2007). Russian Empire: Space, People, Power, 1700-1930. Bloomington and Indianapolis: Indiana University Press. ISBN 978-0253219114.
- Figes, Orlando (2014). A People's Tragedy: The Russian Revolution 1891–1924. London: The Bodley Head. ISBN 9781847922915.
- Malle, Silvana (1985). The Economic Organization of War Communism, 1918—1921. Soviet and East European Studies. Cambridge: Cambridge University Press. ISBN 9780521302920.
- Shanin, Teodor (1985). Russia as a Developing Society: Roots of Otherness - Russia's Turn of Century. Volume 1. London: The MacMillan Press Ltd. ISBN 978-0-333-38251-6.
