= The Economic Organization of War Communism =

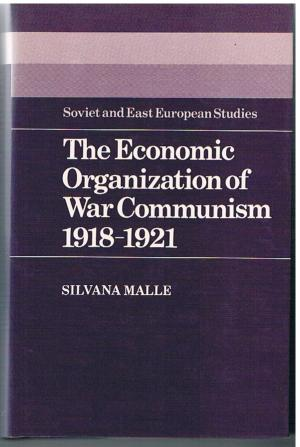
- Cover of the first edition (1985)
- Author: Silvana Malle
- Subject: Russian history
- Published: 1985 (Cambridge University Press)
- Pages: xv, 548
- ISBN: 9780521302920

The Economic Organization of War Communism, 1918—1921, is a history book by Silvana Malle about economics of Soviet Russia during war communism time.
