= Ivan Vladimirov =

Russian painter (1870–1947)

- Ива́н Влади́миров
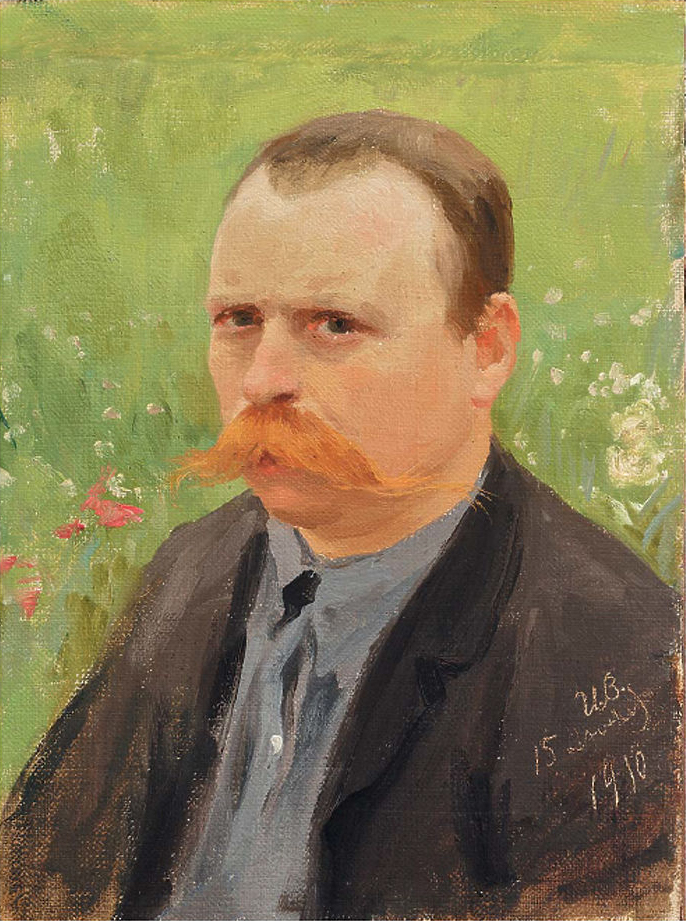
- Self-portrait, 1910
- Born: 10 January 1870 [O.S. 29 December 1869]
- Died: 14 December 1947 (aged 77)
- Resting place: Serafimovskoe Cemetery, Saint Petersburg
- Education: Imperial Academy of Arts
- Occupation: War artist
- Known for: Paintings that glorified the October Revolution
- Movement: Military art
- Awards: Order of the Red Banner of Labour

Ivan Alekseyevich Lindholm Vladimirov , also John Wladimiroff (Russian: Иван Алексеевич Владимиров; 10 January 1870 [O.S. 29 December 1869], Vilna – 14 December 1947) was a Russian artist, painter and graphic artist. During the wars of 1904–1916, he became known as a war artist ("batalist"). Afterwards, his reputation has become controversial. In the Soviet Union, he was known for paintings that glorified the October Revolution. However, in the West and in Russia after the dissolution of the Soviet Union, he has become known for harshly critical imagery of the aftermath of the Revolution.

== The two sides of the Revolution ==
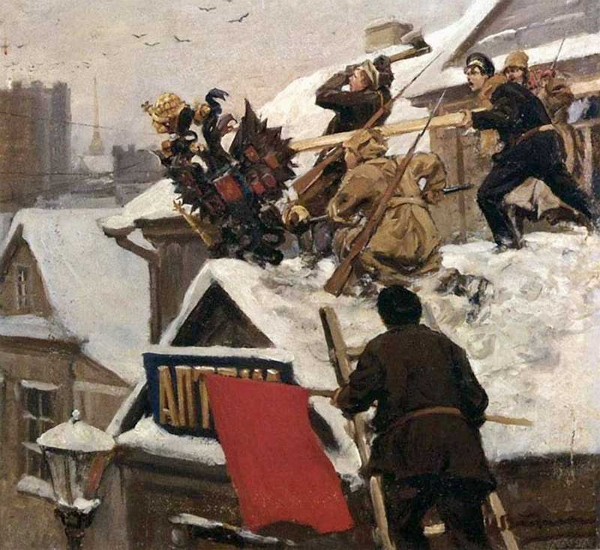
Down with the Eagle (tearing down symbols of the Russian Empire), 1917

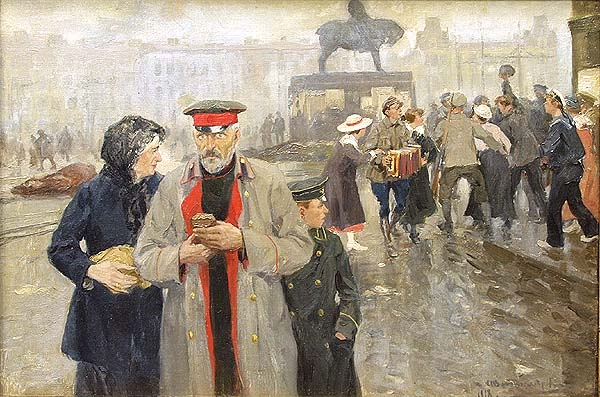
On the Streets of Petrograd, 1918

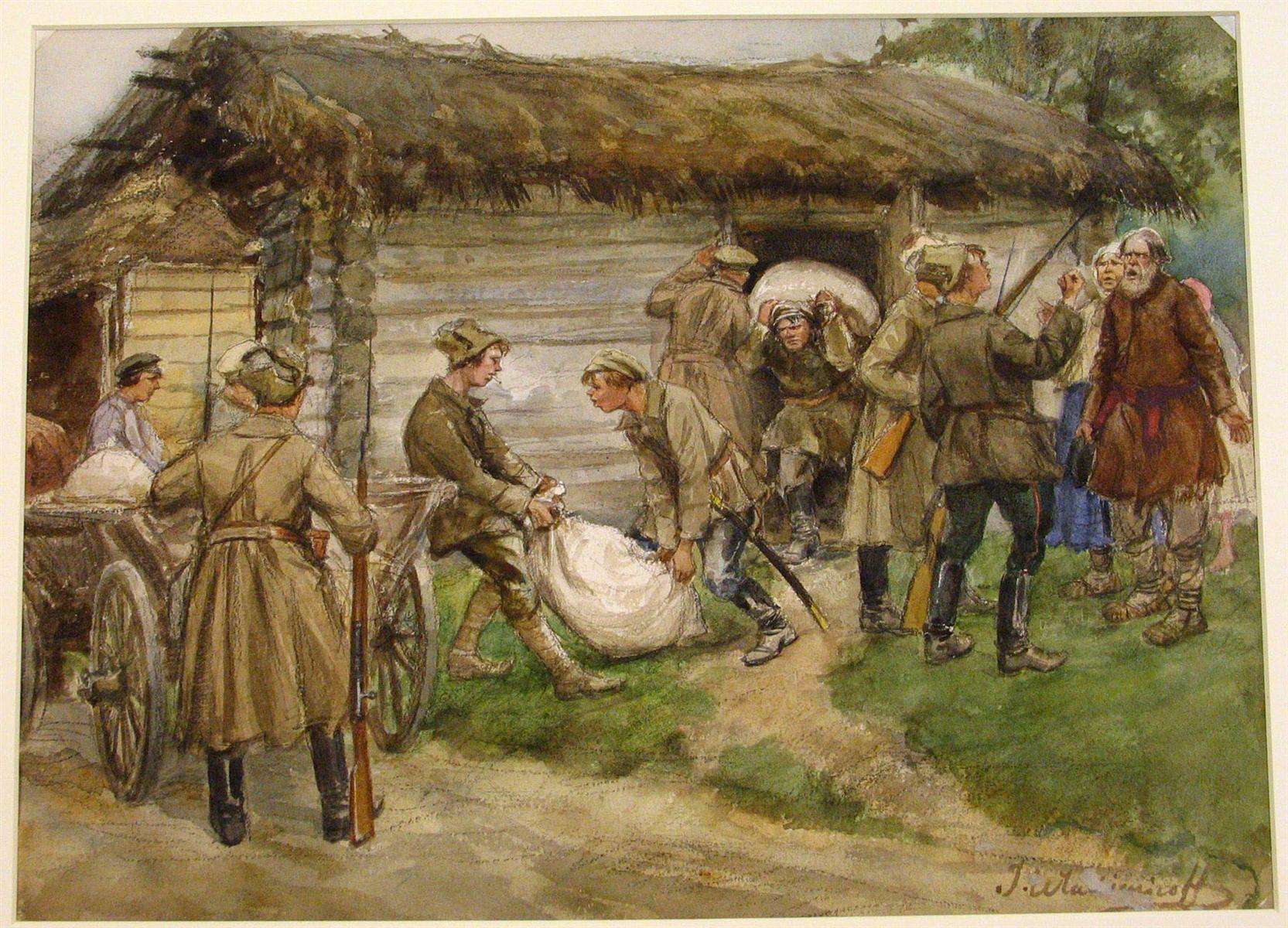
Prodrazvyorstka (grain requisitioning)

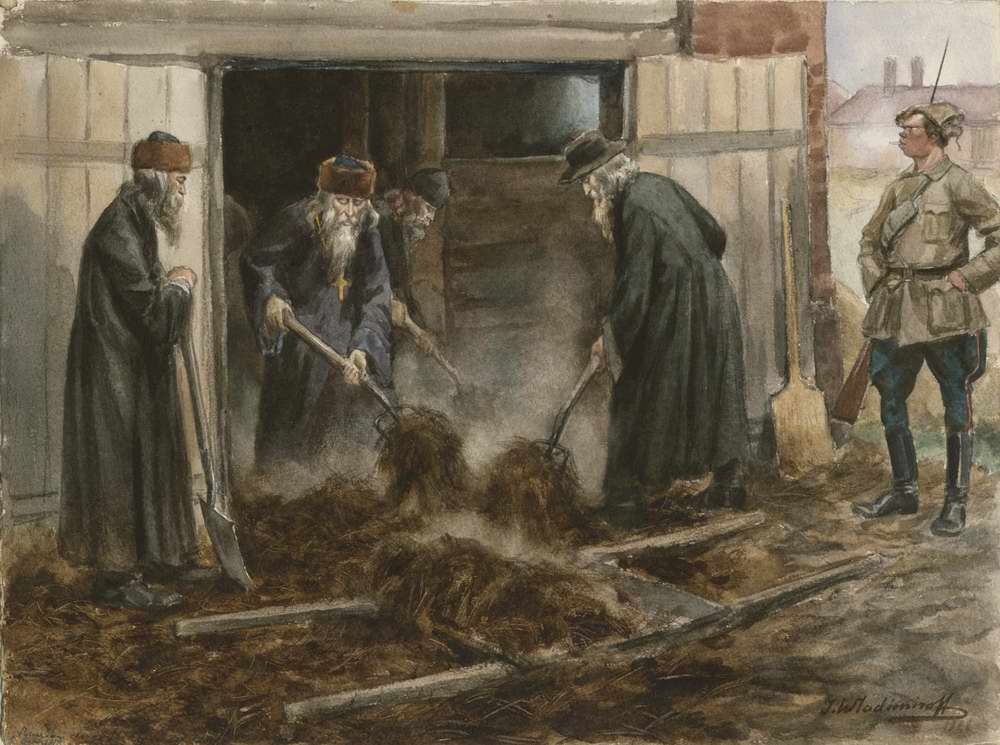
Clergy on forced labour, 1919

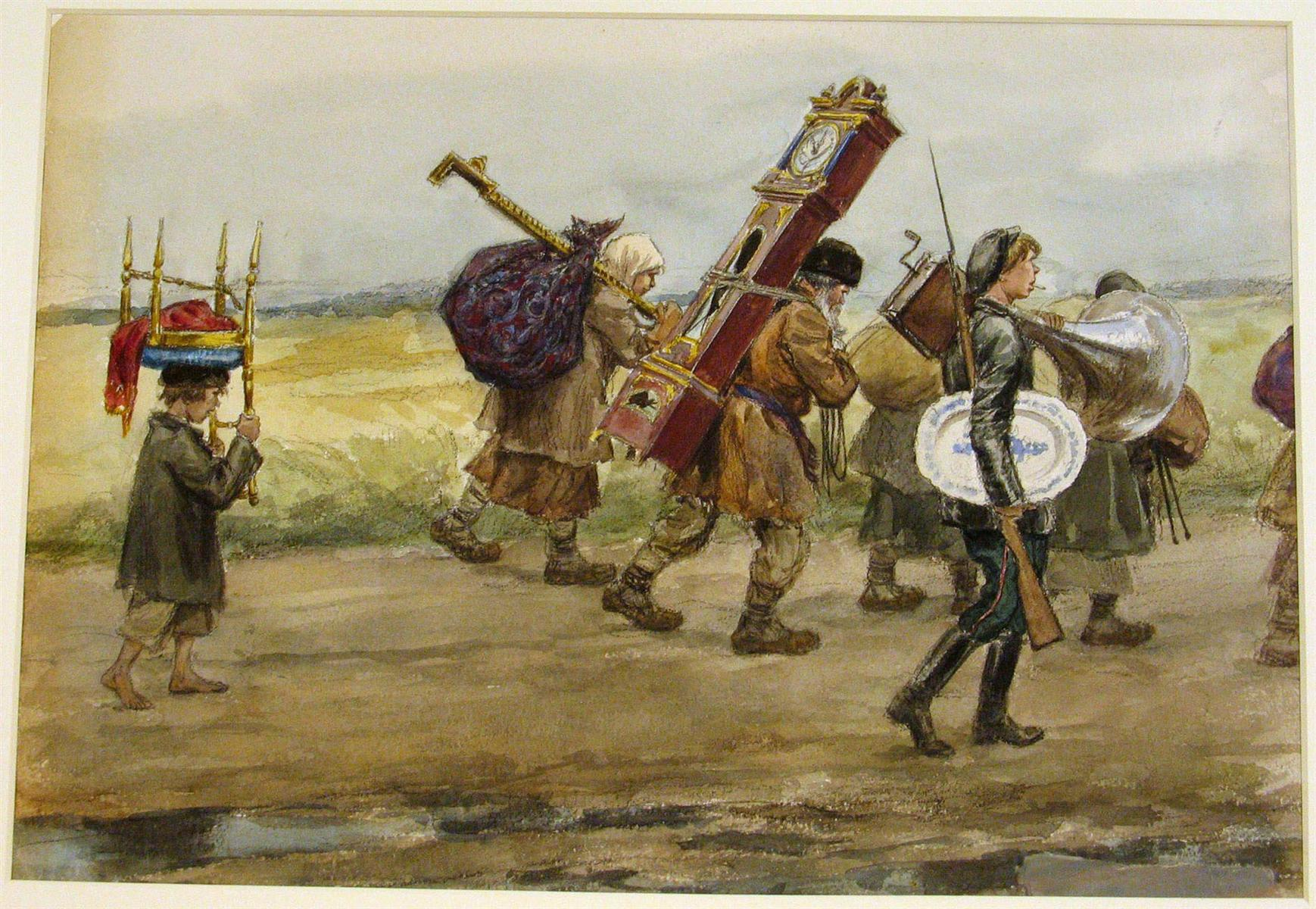
From their homes

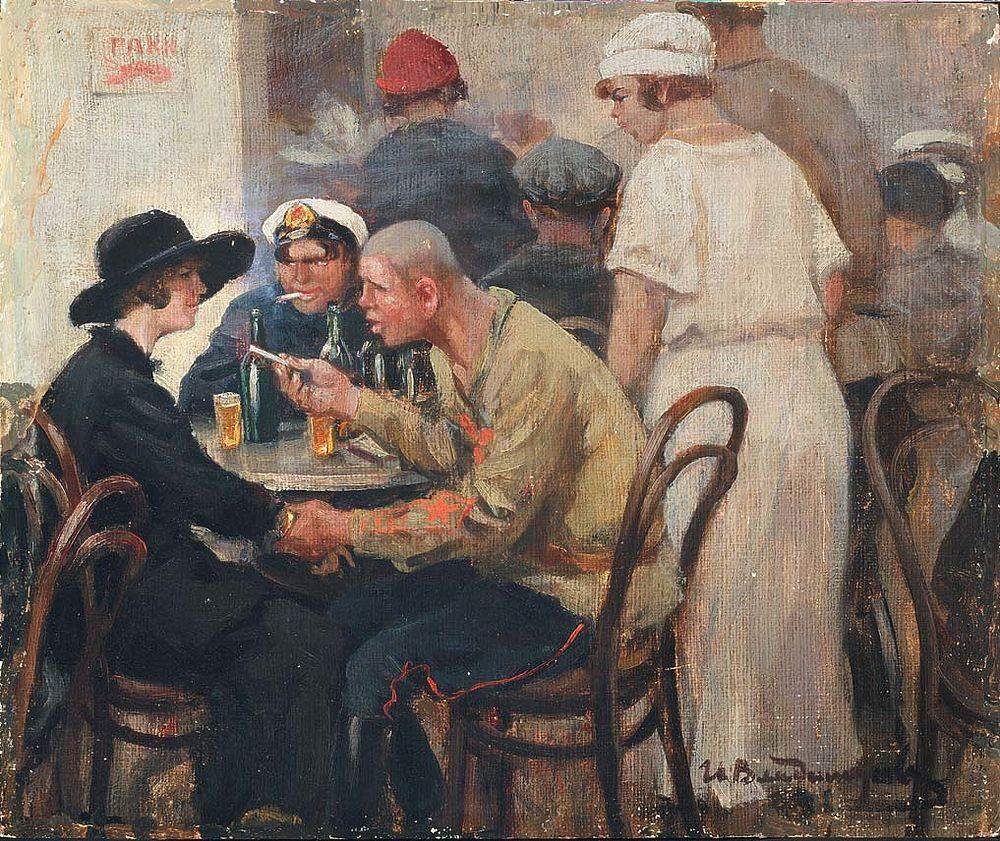
No one to protect, 1921

== Biography ==
Ivan Vladimirov was born in Vilnius to Russian intellectual Aleksei Porfirievich Vladimirov, a priest, and a British mother, Catherine Waghorn, a watercolor artist. In non-Russian documents, the family spelled their name as Wladimiroff and the artist spelled his name in English as John Wladimiroff.

He is interred in the Serafimovskoe Cemetery, St. Petersburg.

== Awards and decorations ==
- 1946: Honoured Worker of the Arts Industry of the RSFSR
- 1945: Order of the Red Banner of Labour, for the "fruitful activity in the field of Soviet art"
- Various medals
- 1897: "Class artist of the first degree" title for the painting "Бой адыгейцев на реке Малке" ("The Battle of Circassians by Malka River")
- 1890s: Awards for battle scenes
