= Great Break (Soviet Union) =

1928–29 change in Soviet economic policy under Stalin

The Great Break (Russian: Великий перелом), also called the Great Turn, was the radical change in the economic policy of the USSR from 1928 to 1929, primarily consisting of the process by which the New Economic Policy (NEP) of 1921 was abandoned in favor of the acceleration of collectivization and industrialization and also a cultural revolution. The term came from the title of Joseph Stalin's article "Year of the Great Turn: Toward the 12th Anniversary of October" («Год великого перелома: к XII годовщине Октября») published on 7 November 1929, the 12th anniversary of the October Revolution. David R. Marples argues that the era of the Great Break lasted until 1934.

One of the factors that directly contributed to the Great Break was the war scare of 1926–27. Because Stalin and other senior leaders believed in the imminent threat of a Western invasion (particularly from the British Empire and Poland), they decided that the gradualism of the NEP years had to be replaced by a fast-paced policy, aiming to transform the country into an industrial powerhouse with a strong military.

== Collectivization ==
Up to 1928, Stalin supported the New Economic Policy instituted under Lenin. The NEP had brought some market reforms to the Soviet economy, including allowing peasants to sell surplus grain on the domestic and international market. However, in 1928 Stalin changed his position and opposed continuation of the NEP. Part of the reason for his change was that the peasants in the years before 1928 started hoarding grain in response to low domestic and international prices for their produce.

Stalin implemented agricultural collectivization, which would end private ownership of land. The state would take land from its previous owners and place it either under collective ownership of peasants (kolkhoz) or under state ownership (sovkhoz). The idea behind collectivization was that large estates tend to yield more agricultural output. Also, owners of a large farm tended to be better able to afford machinery such as tractors and threshers than owners of small plots of land, and these technological implements would increase worker productivity. A side effect would be freeing up peasants to move to the cities and construction sites to aid the industrialization process. Before collectivization, the owners of large farms tended to be wealthy peasants (kulaks) but the Bolsheviks regarded the kulaks as capitalist exploiters, and wished to redistribute the surplus land to the poorer peasants. The only way to have large farms without kulak owners was to form collective farms.

The Soviet state needed increased agricultural output to feed the workers in the cities and construction sites. The end of the NEP meant that peasants would no longer be able to sell grain to the state. Thus, the state would have to requisition surplus grain.

Collectivization met with little success before 1934 in terms of agricultural output. The Soviet state was slow to provide the necessary tractors and other machinery to the collective farms and this delay caused a reduction in agricultural output. Peasants also resisted the collectivization process by slaughtering their livestock and hiding harvested grain in protest, reducing output even more. On top of these two conditions, the state was requisitioning more grain than the quantity produced. These three factors coupled with a severe drought and a slow response from the soviet administration led to a famine in parts of the countryside in 1932–33 including Kazakhstan, Ukraine and southern Russia. The famine and drought were so severe in the region that it also affected other countries such as Romania. In Ukraine, at least four million peasants died. In Kazakhstan, during the Kazakh famine of 1930–1933 over estimated 1.5-2.3 million out of about 4 million Kazakh population died. In addition 660,000 to 1 million Kazakhs fled to China.

== Industrialization ==
While collectivization did not meet with much success, industrialization during the Great Break did. Stalin announced his first Five-Year Plan for industrialization in 1928. The goals of his plan were unrealistic – for example, he wished to increase worker productivity by 110 percent. Yet even though the country was not able to meet these overambitious goals, it still did considerably increase the industrial output.

Industrialization involved expanding the numbers of factories and construction projects such as dams, railways, and canals. Examples of well-publicized construction projects at the time are the completion in June 1930 of a huge tractor factory in Stalingrad and the Dnieper Hydroelectric Station.

The increased number of projects meant an increased demand for workers, and as a result the Soviet state did not experience any unemployment during the Great Break.
