= War Scare of 1927 =

Crisis in Anglo-Soviet relations

The War Scare of 1927 was a crisis in Anglo–Soviet relations involving the perceived threat of a forthcoming war between the USSR and the United Kingdom and Poland in 1926 and 1927. The incident is generally viewed as an overreaction by Soviet leaders to menacing military statements and a severing of diplomatic relations by the Conservative government in United Kingdom in the aftermath of the British General Strike of 1926.

Many historians have subsequently emphasized the way the bogey of foreign invasion was utilized in 1927 by the All–Union Communist Party, or VKP(b), as a justification for repression of internal political dissent and a move toward the radical and violent grain procurement policies that ultimately ended the Soviet New Economic Policy.

== History ==
While Anglo-Soviet relations of that time were overall marked by distrust, in May 1927 the relationships between the two countries were severed following the police raid on the All Russian Co-operative Society (ARCOS), which became known as an "Arcos affair" or "Arcos raid".

In the course of the "Soviet War Scare" the Soviet government issued instructions for the Politburo to incorporate slogans into the propaganda campaign such as those listed below:

"a) The fascist crushing of the mass revolutionary and national liberation movement in Western Belorussia by Piłsudski is a preparation of the rear for Piłsudski's future attack on the BSSR.

b) By means of fascist coups [here mostly likely the May Coup of Piłsudski is referred to] in the states bordering the USSR, England is preparing the attack on the USSR. Be on the alert.

c) The task of the workers of the BSSR is to strengthen the defense of the USSR and thus to ensure the peace policy of the USSR."

The result of it was a considerable mismatch between the reports of the Red Army stating that "no immediate preparations [of the supposed enemy] for war can be discerned" and the media telling people to prepare for the war. The "war hysteria" was eventually used to fight the political opposition.

Yet, the other result of such rumours was, that the Soviet Union obtained the chance to discern the attitudes of the civil population towards the government. It is stated, that in rural settlements only poor people were ready to defend the government, while middle-class peasants (referred to as "sredniak") and wealthy peasants (referred to as "Kulaks") expressed the desire, if armed, to fight against the government instead. Later in 1928–1929 the government officially announced the policy known as "dekulakization".

The war scare had a direct impact on Soviet policy. Because Stalin and other senior leaders believed in the imminent threat of a Western invasion, they decided that the gradualism of the NEP years had to be replaced by a fast-paced policy, aiming to transform the country into an industrial powerhouse with a strong military. In this sense, the war scare contributed to bringing about the Great Break, which saw the abandonment of the NEP in favor of large-scale collectivization and massive investments in heavy industry.

== See also ==
- All Russian Cooperative Society (ARCOS)
- Left Opposition
- Collectivization in the Soviet Union
