= Dekulakization =

1929–1932 Soviet repression of peasants

- Part of the collectivization in the Soviet Union
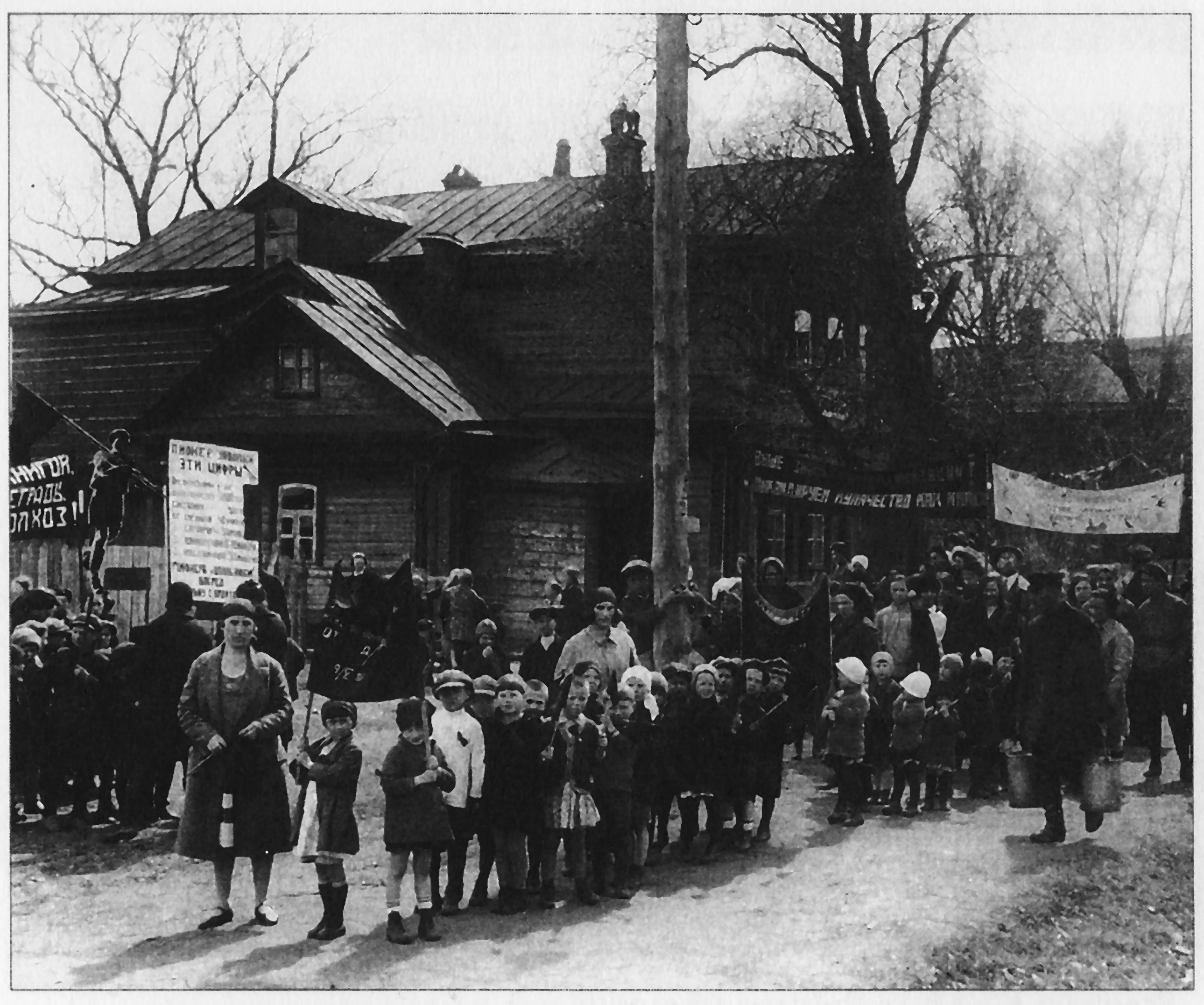
- A parade under the banners "We will liquidate the kulaks as a class" and "All to the struggle against the wreckers of agriculture"
- Location: Soviet Union
- Date: 1929–1933
- Attack type: Mass murder, deportation, starvation
- Deaths: 530,000–600,000
- Perpetrator: Secret police of the Soviet Union

Dekulakization (Russian: раскулачивание, romanized: raskulachivaniye; Ukrainian: розкуркулення, romanized: rozkurkulennya) was a campaign of repression in the Soviet Union directed against so-called kulaks, a loosely defined category of supposedly wealthy or exploitative peasants. The campaign involved mass arrests, executions, expropriation of property, and deportations of entire households to remote and inhospitable regions.

The campaign began following Joseph Stalin's announcement of the "liquidation of the kulaks as a class" on December 27, 1929. It had two objectives: to eliminate potential resistance to the collectivization of agriculture, and to provide forced labor for the colonization and economic exploitation of Siberia, the Urals, Kazakhstan, and the Soviet North. Between 2.1 and 2.3 million people were deported to special settlements in remote regions between 1930 and 1933. Between 20,000 and 30,000 were executed by extrajudicial commissions (troiki). Historian Manfred Hildermeier estimates the death toll of dekulakization, excluding the subsequent famine, at between 530,000 and 600,000, including deaths in transit and in special settlements through 1953.

The definition of "kulak" was arbitrary and elastic; official criteria were vague, and in practice the label was sometimes applied not only to rich peasants but also extended to some middle peasants (a category that was theoretically supposed to be distinct from kulaks and to include those of average means who were not exploiters), to those who resisted collectivization, to clergy, to former tsarist officials, and to others deemed politically unreliable. One 1930 OGPU (Soviet secret police) report found that only 55 percent of those classified as "kulaks" in one region were actually peasants who met even the nominal economic criteria.

The mass deportations provided the OGPU with a vast pool of forced labor that became the cornerstone of the Gulag system, along with contributing greatly to the collapse of Soviet agriculture that caused the Soviet famine of 1930–1933, including the Holodomor. Those classified as kulaks in 1930–1933 were again targeted during the Great Terror of 1937–1938 under NKVD Order No. 00447.

== Background ==
=== The Bolsheviks and the Peasantry ===
Beginning in the spring of 1917, following the February Revolution, peasants across the former Russian Empire seized lands belonging to the state, nobility, church, and monasteries. The October Revolution and its Decree on Land legitimized these seizures, leaving redistribution to the traditional village commune. During the ensuing Russian Civil War, both Red and White armies requisitioned grain, though peasants generally regarded the Reds as the lesser evil due to fears that a White victory would restore the landlords. The increasing ruthlessness of Bolshevik requisitioning nevertheless alienated much of the peasantry, particularly in major grain-producing regions. Following the end of the civil war, peasant revolts broke out in Tambov and Ukraine, and in 1921–1922 the Volga region suffered a devastating famine that killed approximately five million people, caused in large part by years of excessive grain requisitioning.

The New Economic Policy (NEP), introduced in 1921, replaced requisitions with taxes and permitted market exchange in agricultural goods. For the peasantry, who constituted approximately 85 percent of the Soviet population, the NEP years brought a period of relative prosperity and autonomy.

The Bolsheviks commanded little to no authority in rural villages. The Soviet regime remained alien to most peasants, and incoming party functionaries, hailing almost entirely from cities, found themselves in a hostile environment. Villages continued to govern themselves through the traditional assembly (skhod), while the Bolshevik-sponsored village soviets exercised little real influence. Lenin and the Bolsheviks viewed this persistence with suspicion, regarding the peasantry as potential restorers of capitalism.

=== Industrialization and collectivization ===
The Soviets' chief economic priority during the NEP was industrialization, to be financed through grain exports. In the mid-1920s, the party debated how heavily to tax the peasantry: Yevgeni Preobrazhensky of the Left Opposition argued that the state should pay low prices for grain while charging high prices for industrial goods, transferring wealth from the countryside to fund industrial growth, while Nikolai Bukharin of the Right Opposition warned that squeezing the peasantry too hard would destroy the smychka (alliance between workers and peasants) and destabilize the nascent regime.

Echoing Preobrazhensky, Stalin declared that the peasantry owed a "tribute" to pay for industrialization and to feed the cities and army, and he argued that collective farms were the best means of extracting such a tribute. On 7 November 1929, he proclaimed a "great turn," claiming that middle peasants were voluntarily joining collectives. Targets were revised sharply upward: full collectivization of major grain-producing regions was now expected by autumn 1930. By 1 January 1930, official figures showed 18.1 percent of peasant households collectivized nationwide, with far higher rates in grain-producing regions. In practice, most who joined were poor peasants, and regional campaigns had already resorted to coercion.

=== Grain procurement crisis ===
In 1927, despite a good harvest, the amount of grain reaching state purchasers dropped sharply. Peasants had multiple reasons to hold back grain: consumption levels had risen during the NEP years, a shortage of manufactured goods meant there was little worth buying, and the war scare of 1927 encouraged hoarding. The Stalinist faction attributed the shortfall to a "kulak grain strike."

In 1928 and 1929, the party implemented increasingly coercive procurement methods. Village assemblies were pressured to assign grain quotas to individual households, particularly targeting those labeled as kulaks. Peasants who failed to deliver grain faced fines of up to five times the value of the undelivered grain, prosecution under Article 107 of the criminal code for speculation and hoarding, and confiscation of property. In June 1929, new legislation made entire villages collectively responsible for meeting quotas.

Peasants resisted by burying grain, transferring stocks to relatives, selling to private traders, or simply consuming more themselves. Better-off peasants increasingly engaged in "self-dekulakization," selling their property and fleeing to cities before it could be confiscated.

== Dekulakization in 1930s ==
Joseph Stalin announced the "liquidation of the kulaks as a class" on 27 December 1929. Stalin had said: "Now we have the opportunity to carry out a resolute offensive against the kulaks, break their resistance, eliminate them as a class and replace their production with the production of kolkhozes and sovkhozes." The Politburo of the All-Union Communist Party (Bolsheviks) formalized the decision in a resolution titled "On measures for the elimination of kulak households in districts of comprehensive collectivization" on 30 January 1930. All kulaks were assigned to one of three categories:

1. Those to be shot or imprisoned as decided by the local secret political police.
2. Those to be sent to Siberia, the North, the Urals, or Kazakhstan, after confiscation of their property.
3. Those to be evicted from their houses and used in labour colonies within their own districts.

Those kulaks that were sent to Siberia and other unpopulated areas performed hard labor working in camps that would produce lumber, gold, coal and many other resources that the Soviet Union needed for its rapid industrialization plans. A high-ranking member of the OGPU (the secret police) shared Stalin's vision for a new penal system which would establish villages in the northern Soviet Union that could specialize in extracting natural resources.

An OGPU secret-police functionary, Yefim Yevdokimov, played a major role in organizing and supervising the round-up of peasants and mass executions as part of dekulakization.

Millions of people were arrested, deported, or executed in the process of dekulakization.

Stalin's adversary, Leon Trotsky, condemned the "liquidation of the kulaks" in 1930 as a "monstrosity" and had urged the Politbureau during the intra-party struggle to raise taxation on wealthier farmers and encourage farm labourers along with poor peasants to form collective farms on a voluntary basis with state resources allocated to agricultural machinery, fertilizers, credit and agronomic assistance.

== Categorization of Kulaks ==
The Politburo resolution of January 30, 1930 divided the kulaks into three categories based on their perceived threat to Soviet power.

1. Category I, the "counter-revolutionary aktiv": Those deemed to be actively engaged in counter-revolutionary activities. Their means of production and personal property would be confiscated. Heads of households were to be sentenced on the spot to imprisonment in a concentration camp, or, if deemed to be "organizers of terrorist acts, counter-revolutionary demonstrations and insurrectionary organisations," executed. Other members of the household would be placed into Category II.
2. Category II, the "remaining elements of the kulak aktiv", especially the richest kulaks and semi-landowners: Those considered less actively opposed to collectivization. Their means of production and part of their property would be confiscated, and they would be exiled to remote regions of the Soviet Union or remote districts in their home region.
3. Category III, the remainder, described as "reliable in their attitude to Soviet power": Part of their means of production would be confiscated, and they would be resettled outside of the boundaries of the collective farms but within the same administrative district.

The resolution of January 30, 1930 also established USSR-wide quotas distributed among the regions, determining how many peasants would be labelled kulaks: between 49,000–60,000 persons would be placed into Category I, and 129,000–154,000 households in Category II. No quota was set for Category III, but the total number of kulak households across all categories was to be capped at 3–5 percent of the population in grain-producing areas and 2–3 percent elsewhere. These quotas were quickly exceeded. By October 1930, 284,000 people had been arrested under Category I. By the end of 1930, approximately 330,000 households, encompassing over 1.5 million people, had been expropriated across all three categories.

== Children during dekulakization ==
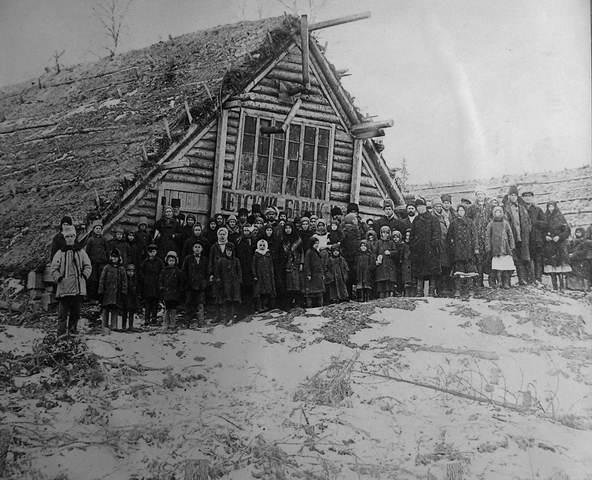
Children of kulaks in Northern krai, 1930

Children were among the millions of people who were impacted by the Soviet Union's 1930s dekulakization initiatives. Families in their entirety, including children of all ages, were frequently deported to distant parts of the nation or sent to camps for forced labor.

Children were "put into homes or orphanages and separated from their families as part of the dekulakization policies in the Soviet Union during the 1930s," according to historian Lynne Viola. These measures aimed to reduce kulak family resistance and enhance agricultural production under state supervision. Millions of individuals, including kids of all ages, were consequently subjected to forced labor, deportation, and other types of punishment.

Children from kulak families were seen by the Soviet authorities as a potential threat to the collectivization process, and they believed that separating children from their parents would weaken the kulaks' resistance. When children were committed to orphanages or other institutions, they were frequently taken away from their family, subjected to harsh living conditions, and frequently neglected or abused.

== Women during dekulakization ==
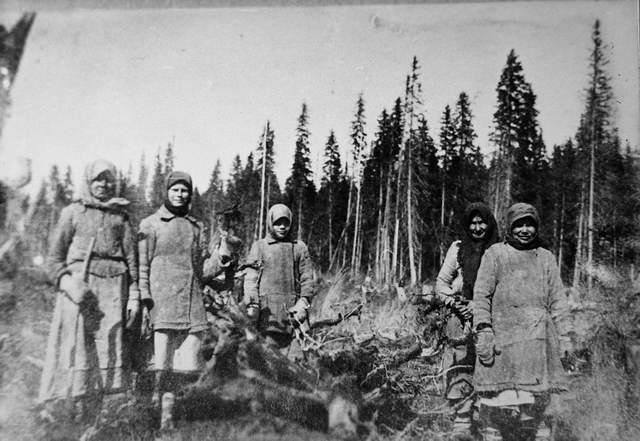
Kulak women in a forest cutting 1930

The Soviet Union's 1930s dekulakization efforts had an impact on millions of individuals, including women. If they were married to or related to kulaks, women were seen as potential enemies of the state since they were assumed to be complicit with their husbands or male relatives. Because of this, they were frequently singled out by the government for arrest, deportation, and jail.

Women were targeted by the campaign, according to historian Lynne Viola, who notes that they were "kulaks'" spouses, mothers, and sisters. Women were frequently treated harshly, including being arrested and deported, because they were seen as possible kulak conspirators. During the dekulakization effort, they had to deal with a variety of difficulties, such as losing their homes and belongings, being separated from their families, as well as the danger of forced labor and violence, both physical and sexual. Many of them experienced starvation, sickness, and exhaustion as a result of the forced hard labor they were required to undertake in the factories or the fields.

== The OGPU during dekulakization ==
The secret police were crucial in enforcing Soviet government objectives during the dekulakization program in the Soviet Union. Kulaks and their families were subject to arrest, deportation, and execution by the secret police known as the OGPU.

The OGPU was granted the authority to track down and assassinate kulaks, and they were allowed to use force and brutality to do so. Mass deportations and arrests of kulaks and their families were carried out by the secret police, frequently without cause or due process.

The Gulag, a system of forced labor camps founded by the OGPU, was where many kulaks were transported to work in perilous circumstances. Numerous captives suffered from starvation, illness, and torture in the notoriously cruel camps.

== Classicide ==
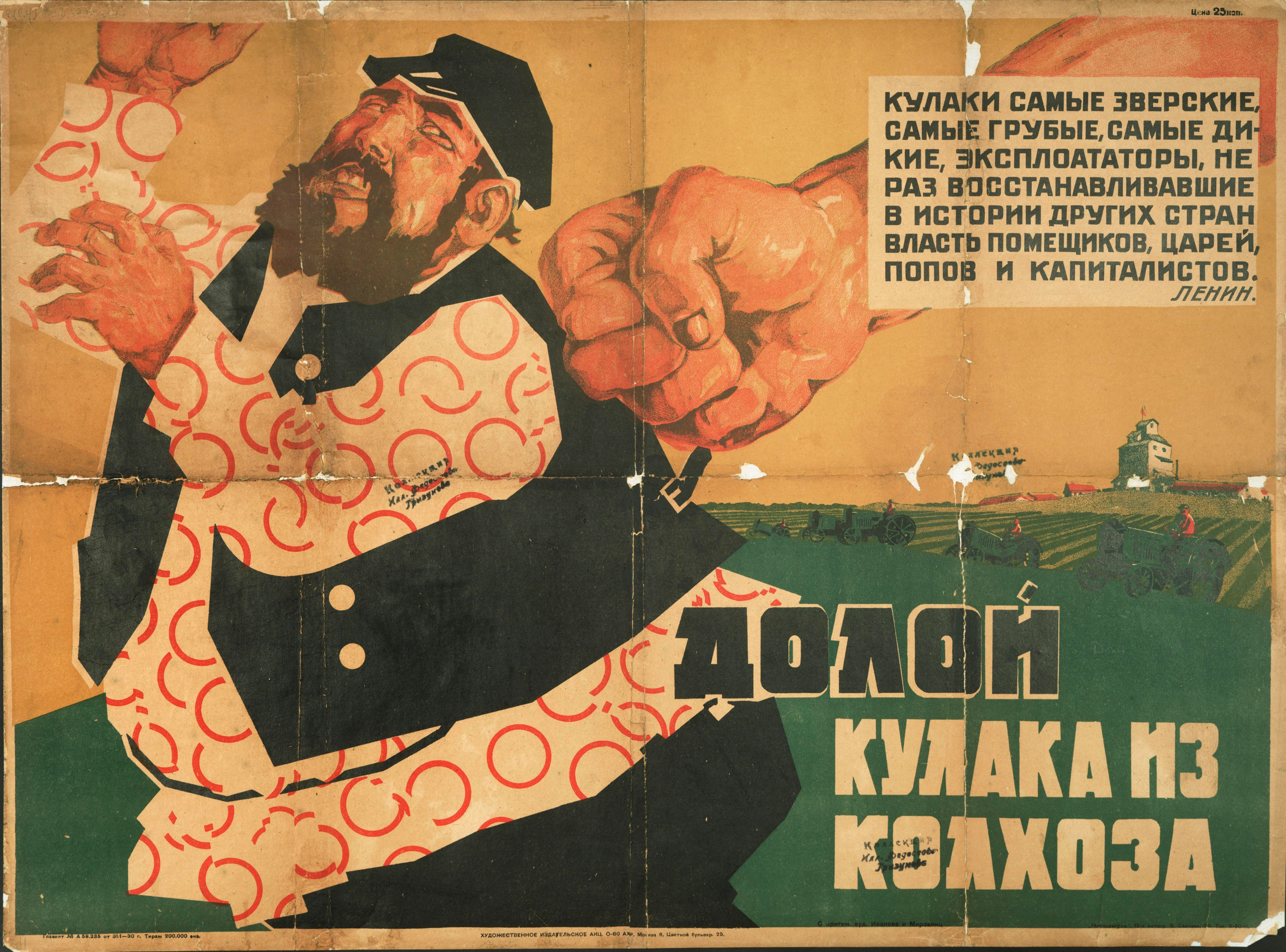
1930s Soviet propaganda poster stating: "Oust kulaks from kolkhozes!"

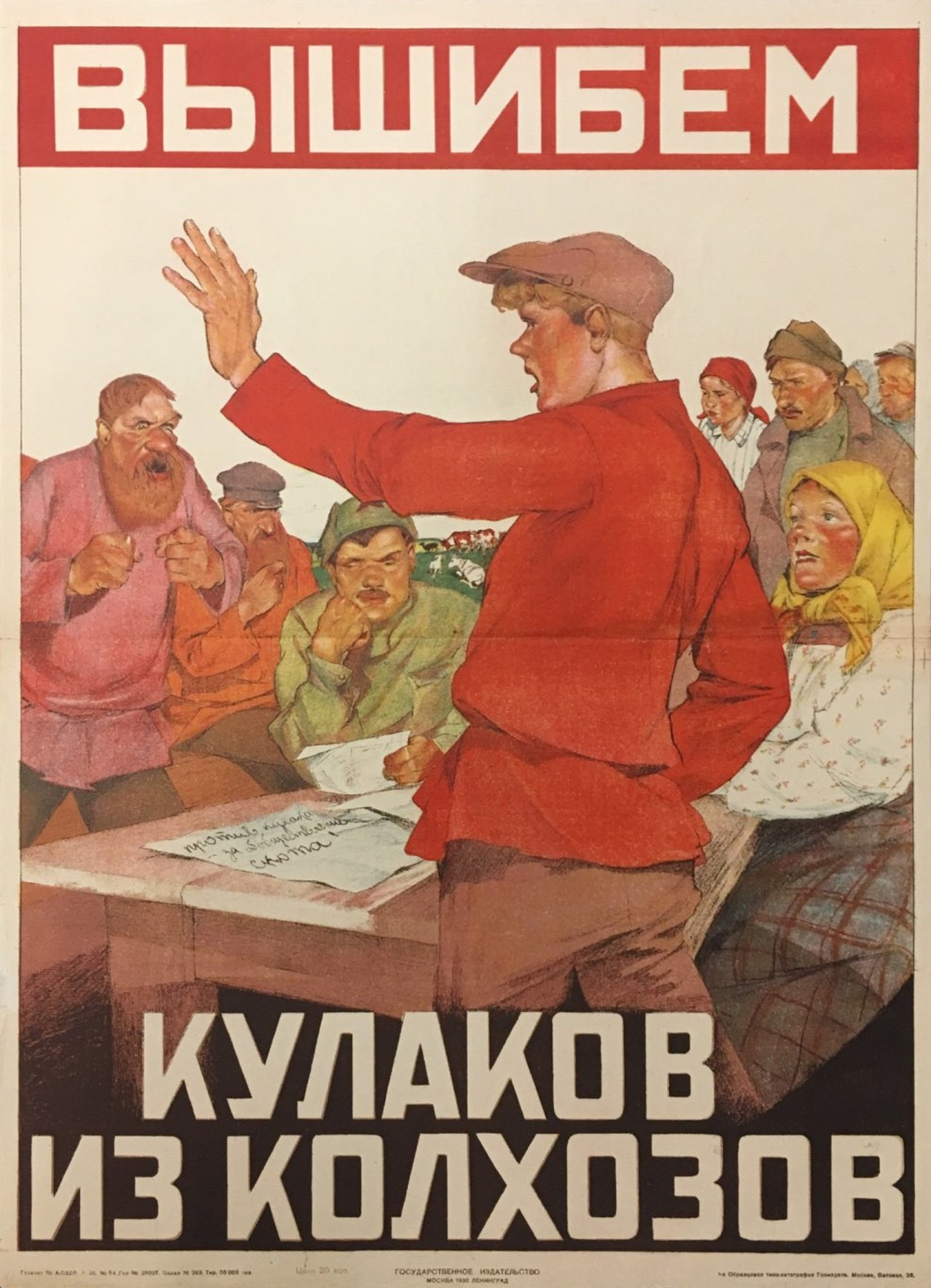
Another 1930s Soviet propaganda poster stating: "Kick kulaks from kolkhozes".

In February 1928, the Pravda newspaper published for the first time materials that claimed to expose the kulaks; they described widespread domination by the rich peasantry in the countryside and invasion by kulaks of Communist party cells. Expropriation of grain stocks from kulaks and middle-class peasants was called a "temporary emergency measure"; temporary emergency measures turned into a policy of "eliminating the kulaks as a class" by the 1930s. Sociologist Michael Mann described the Soviet attempt to collectivize and liquidate perceived class enemies as fitting his proposed category of classicide.

The party's appeal to the policy of eliminating the kulaks as a class had been formulated by Stalin, who stated: "In order to oust the kulaks as a class, the resistance of this class must be smashed in open battle and it must be deprived of the productive sources of its existence and development (free use of land, instruments of production, land-renting, right to hire labour, etc.). That is a turn towards the policy of eliminating the kulaks as a class. Without it, talk about ousting the kulaks as a class is empty prattle, acceptable and profitable only to the Right deviators."

In 1928, the Right Opposition of the All-Russian Communist Party (Bolsheviks) was still trying to support the prosperous peasantry and soften the struggle against the kulaks. In particular, Alexei Rykov, criticizing the policy of dekulakization and "methods of war communism", declared that an attack on the kulaks should be carried out but not by methods of so-called dekulakization. He argued against taking action against individual farming in the village, the productivity of which was two times lower than in European countries. He believed that the most important task of the party was the development of the individual farming of peasants with the help of the government.

The government increasingly noticed an open and resolute protest among the poor against the well-to-do middle peasants. The growing discontent of the poor peasants was reinforced by the famine in the countryside. The Bolsheviks preferred to blame the "rural counterrevolution" of the kulaks, intending to aggravate the attitude of the people towards the party: "We must repulse the kulak ideology coming in the letters from the village. The main advantage of the kulak is bread embarrassments." Red Army peasants sent letters supporting anti-kulak ideology: "The kulaks are the furious enemies of socialism. We must destroy them, don't take them to the kolkhoz, you must take away their property, their inventory." The letter of the Red Army soldier of the 28th Artillery Regiment became widely known: "The last bread is taken away, the Red Army family is not considered. Although you are my dad, I do not believe you. I'm glad that you had a good lesson. Sell bread, carry surplus – this is my last word."

== Effects of dekulakization on the Soviet Union ==
Dekulakization had a significant impact on the Soviet Union, both in the short and long term. Some of the main effects were:

1. Collectivization: One of the main goals of dekulakization was to forcibly collectivize agriculture, which led to the creation of large, state-run collective farms. This transformed the way food was produced in the Soviet Union and had a profound impact on the country's rural economy.
2. Economic disruption: The process of dekulakization caused significant economic disruption in rural areas of the Soviet Union. Many of the most productive farmers were forcibly removed from their land, which led to a decline in agricultural output and disrupted local markets.
3. Human cost: Dekulakization was a brutal campaign that led to the deportation and death of millions of people. Estimates of the number of deaths vary, but it is believed that at least 5 million people died as a result of the policy. This had a profound impact on families and communities across the Soviet Union.
4. Political impact: The implementation of dekulakization was closely tied to the consolidation of power by the Communist Party. The elimination of the kulaks was seen as a way to remove a perceived threat to the socialist state and to strengthen the position of the Party.
5. Long-term consequences: The forced collectivization of agriculture and the elimination of the kulaks had a long-term impact on the Soviet Union. Some historians argue that it contributed to the famine that occurred in the early 1930s, and that it weakened the agricultural sector for years to come. The impact of dekulakization on the Soviet economy and society is still a subject of debate among historians and economists today.

== Liquidation ==
The "liquidation of kulaks as a class" was the name of a Soviet policy enforced in 1930–1931 for forced, uncompensated alienation of property (expropriation) from portions of the peasantry and isolation of victims from such actions by way of their forceful deportation from their place of residence. The official goal of kulak liquidation came without precise instructions, and encouraged local leaders to take radical action, which resulted in physical elimination. The campaign to liquidate the kulaks as a class constituted the main part of Stalin's social engineering policies in the early 1930s.

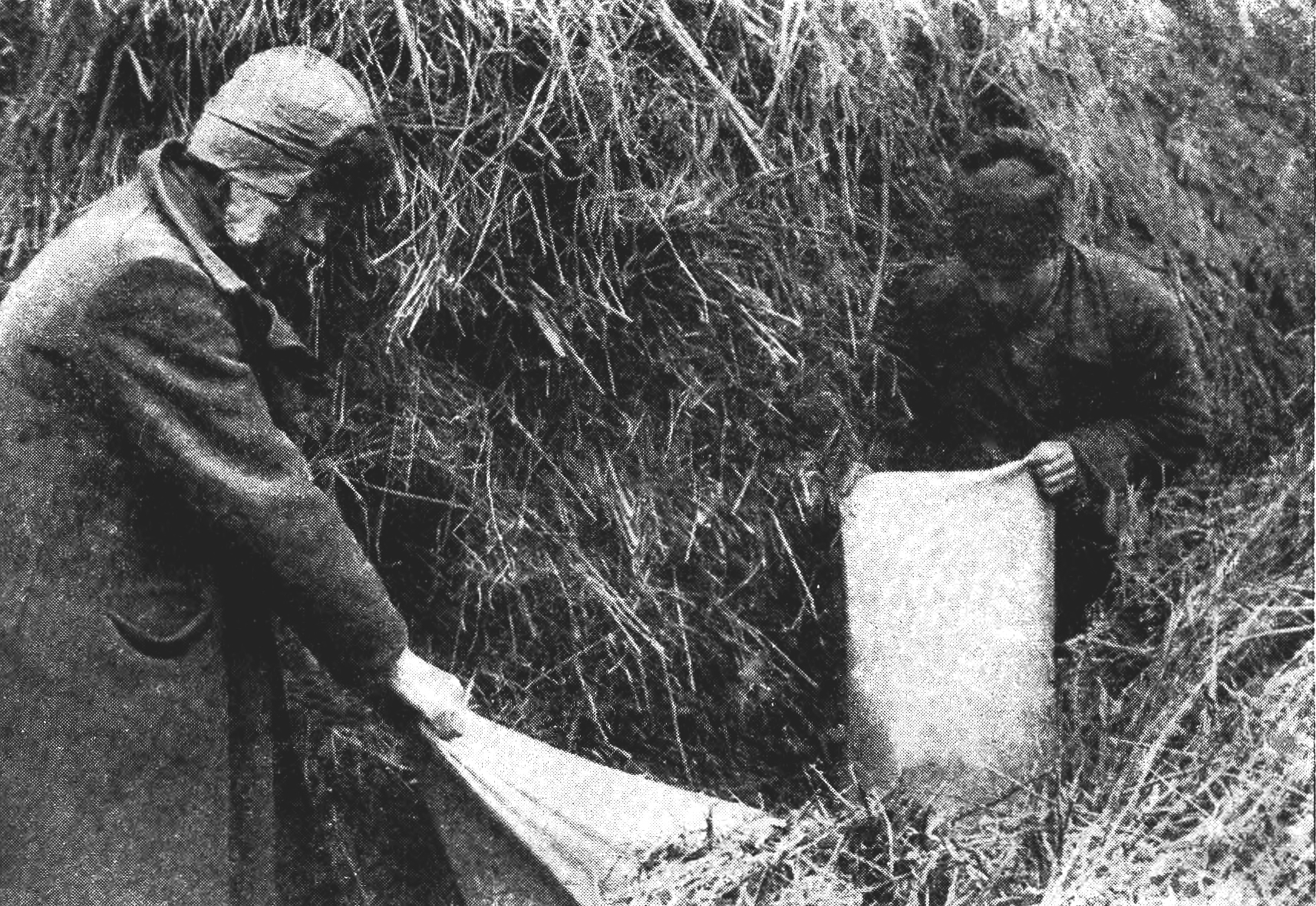
The requisition of grains from wealthy peasants during the forced collectivization in Timashyovsky District, Kuban, Soviet Union, 1933

Liquidation was a term used to describe a Soviet government policy of eradicating political adversaries, intellectuals, and rich persons. The Cheka, the secret police of the Soviet Union, carried out this program through arrests, executions, and other types of repression. Early in the 1920s, a liquidation effort was launched, and it lasted the entire decade.

In the Soviet Union, the term "liquidation" referred to a strategy of removing the Soviet government's adversaries, such as political rivals, intellectuals, and affluent people. The New Economic Policy (NEP), which was implemented by the Soviet secret police known as the Cheka, gave rise to the phrase "liquidation" in the early 1920s.

The liquidation campaign was directed at those who were thought to pose a threat to the Soviet government's attempt to consolidate its control, such as former Tsarist regime members, bourgeois intellectuals, and other deemed adversaries of the state. The liquidation campaign, which included arrests, executions, and other acts of repression, was part of a larger initiative to quell dissent and solidify the Soviet Communist Party's power.

The liquidation campaign was largely focused on the political opponents of the Bolshevik government in the early years of the Soviet Union. The campaign's objectives, however, changed in the late 1920s to include perceived adversaries of the Soviet economy, such as the so-called "kulaks" or prosperous peasant farmers. The drive to eliminate the kulaks was a component of a larger collectivization strategy that attempted to centralize agricultural output under state control.

The liquidation campaign, which lasted through the 1920s and the beginning of the 1930s, was a crucial component of the Soviet Union's endeavor to achieve complete control over all facets of society. Although it is difficult to assess the scope of the campaign and the number of casualties, historians estimate that tens of thousands of individuals were put to death or imprisoned during this time.

The Soviet government targeted the so-called "kulaks" or wealthy peasant farmers, who were viewed as a threat to the collectivization of agriculture, during the most intense era of liquidation, which took place in the late 1920s and early 1930s. Millions of kulaks and their families were deported to remote regions of the Soviet Union as a result of the liquidation campaign against the kulaks, which also drove the collectivization of agriculture. An estimated 5 million people died as a result of this strategy, either through starvation, disease, or violence.

The Soviet authorities targeted a number of additional groups during the liquidation campaign in addition to the kulaks, including former Tsarist regime members, bourgeois intellectuals, and other organizations seen as state adversaries. Depending on the objective and the time period, the campaign's scope and the number of victims varied, but it is obvious that the liquidation campaign was a harsh and repressive measure that resulted in considerable suffering and death.

The program of removing opponents of the Soviet leadership, such as political rivals, intellectuals, and affluent people, was referred to as "liquidation" by the Soviet authorities. The word is an English translation of the Russian verb likvidirovat, which meaning "to liquidate" or "to eliminate." The phrase was not specifically applied to Soviet politics in its earlier usage; rather, it referred to the act of removing barriers or resolving issues. However, the phrase came to be linked with the oppressive and murderous practices of the Soviet secret police, known as the Cheka, in the setting of the Soviet Union.

=== Effects of liquidation in the Soviet Union ===
1. Political purges: The Soviet government targeted several groups during the 1930s, including former Communist Party members, academics, and other so-called enemies of the state. Millions of individuals were imprisoned, subjected to torture, and executed as a result of these purges.
2. Industrialization: The government adopted a strategy of "liquidating" small-scale businesses in favor of sizable, state-run factories. The economy was significantly impacted by this, and major industrial hubs like Magnitogorsk and Norilsk were built as a result.
3. Agriculture: The forced collectivization of farms and elimination of affluent farmers (kulaks), who were regarded as a threat to the socialist state, were referred to as "liquidation" in the context of agriculture. Significant damage was done to the agricultural industry as a consequence, and many people suffered, especially in Kazakhstan.
4. Social and cultural impact: Liquidation had an effect that transcended solely the political and economic spheres. Soviet society and culture were profoundly affected by the purges of the 1930s and other campaigns, which resulted in widespread fear, mistrust, and trauma. The media, the arts, and education were all significantly impacted by the government's attempts to influence and shape public opinion.

== See also ==
- Collectivization in the Ukrainian Soviet Socialist Republic
- Committees of Poor Peasants
- Decossackization
- Population transfer in the Soviet Union
- Land reform in North Vietnam
- Land Reform Movement (China)
- Podkulachnik
- Red Terror
- Stalinist repressions in Azerbaijan

== Sources ==
- Applebaum, Anne. Red Famine: Stalin's War on Ukraine. Anchor, 2017. ISBN 978-0-385-53885-5
- Carr, Edward Hallett. The Bolshevik Revolution, 1917–1923, Volume 3. W. W. Norton & Company, 1966. ISBN 978-0-393-30199-1
- Conquest, Robert. The Harvest of Sorrow: Soviet Collectivization and the Terror-Famine. Oxford University Press, 1986. ISBN 978-0-19-505180-3
- Cohen, Stephen F. Bukharin and the Bolshevik Revolution: A Political Biography, 1888–1938. Oxford University Press, 1979. https://www.amazon.com/Bukharin-Bolshevik-Revolution-Political-1888-1938/dp/0195026976
- Davies, R.W. The Socialist Offensive: The Collectivisation of Soviet Agriculture, 1929–1930. Macmillan, 1980. ISBN 978-0-333-26171-2
- Davies, R.W., and Stephen G. Wheatcroft. The Years of Hunger: Soviet Agriculture, 1931–1933. Palgrave Macmillan, 2004. ISBN 978-0-333-31107-3
- Fitzpatrick, Sheila. The Soviet Rural Crisis in the 1920s. Cambridge University Press, 1982.
- Fitzpatrick, Sheila (1994). Stalin's Peasants: Resistance and Survival in the Russian Village after Collectivization. Oxford University Press. ISBN 978-0-19-506982-2.
- The Russian Revolution. Oxford University Press, 1992. ISBN 978-0-19-280204-0
- Everyday Stalinism: Ordinary Life in Extraordinary Times: Soviet Russia in the 1930s. Oxford University Press, 1994. ISBN 978-0-19-505001-1
- On Stalin's Team: The Years of Living Dangerously in Soviet Politics. Princeton University Press, 2019.
- Getty, Arch. The Origins of the Great Purges: The Soviet Communist Party Reconsidered, 1933–1938. Cambridge University Press, 1985. ISBN 978-0-511-57261-6
- Getty, Arch, and Roberta Manning, editors. Stalinist Terror: New Perspectives. Cambridge University Press, 1993. ISBN 978-0-521-44670-9
- Getty, J. Arch, and Oleg V. Naumov. The Road to Terror: Stalin and the Self-Destruction of the Bolsheviks, 1932–1939. Yale University Press, 1999. ISBN 978-0-300-10407-3
- Gellately, Robert. Lenin, Stalin, and Hitler: The Age of Social Catastrophe. Vintage, 2007. ISBN 978-1-4000-3213-6
- Khlevniuk, Oleg V. The History of the Gulag: From Collectivization to the Great Terror. Yale University Press, 2004. ISBN 978-0-300-09284-4
- Stalin: New Biography of a Dictator. Yale University Press, 2015.
- The History of the Gulag: From Collectivization to the Great Terror. Yale University Press, 2015.
- Kenez, Peter. A History of the Soviet Union from the Beginning to the End. Cambridge University Press, 1999. ISBN 978-0-521-68296-1
- ---. A History of the Soviet Union from the Beginning to the End. Cambridge University Press, 2019.
- Kollontai, Alexandra. Selected Writings of Alexandra Kollontai. Allison & Busby, 1977.
- Kollontai, Pauline. "The Child Deportations in 1930s USSR: Why and How." The Journal of Historical Review, vol. 6, no. 1, 2014, pp. 41–51.
- Kotkin, Stephen. Stalin: Volume I: Paradoxes of Power, 1878–1928. Penguin, 2015.
- Kucherenko, Olga. "The Collectivization of Soviet Agriculture and the Mass Deportation of the Rural Population, 1929-1933." Stalin's Empire of Memory: Russian-Ukrainian Relations in the Soviet Historical Imagination, edited by Serhy Yekelchyk and Roman Szporluk, University of Toronto Press, 2018, pp. 23–51.
- McDermott, Kevin. "Stalin and the Soviet Famine of 1932-33: A Reply to Ellman." Europe-Asia Studies, vol. 53, no. 6, 2001, pp. 965–973.
- Pipes, Richard. The Russian Revolution. Knopf, 1990
- Tucker, R. C. (2009). Stalinism: Essays in historical interpretation. Routledge.
- Viola, Lynne. The Unknown Gulag: The Lost World of Stalin's Special Settlements. Oxford University Press, 2007.
- Viola, Lynne (1996). Peasant Rebels Under Stalin: Collectivization and the Culture of Peasant Resistance. Oxford University Press. ISBN 978-0-19-509169-4.
- Viola, Lynne, V.P. Danilov, N.A. Ivnitskii, and Denis Kozlov, editors. The War Against the Peasantry, 1927–1930. Yale University Press, 2005. ISBN 978-0-300-10612-1
- Werth, Nicolas (1999). "A State against Its People: Violence, Repression, and Terror in the Soviet Union". In Courtois, Stéphane; Werth, Nicolas; Panné, Jean-Louis; Paczkowski, Andrzej; Bartošek, Karel; Margolin, Jean-Louis (eds.). The Black Book of Communism: Crimes, Terror, Repression. Translated by Jonathan Murphy; Mark Kramer. Harvard University Press. ISBN 978-0-674-07608-2.
