= Podkulachnik =

Soviet pejorative

In Soviet phraseology, a podkulachnik (Russian: подкулачник, lit. 'person under the kulaks'; also translated as "sub-kulak" or "kulak henchman"), feminine: podkulachnitsa, was a person who allegedly sided with kulaks in their opposition to the collectivization in the Soviet Union.

== History ==
Podkulachnik is considered by many to be a Stalinist neologism from the late 1920s, however the term was already in use before World War I. After the Russian Revolution, the kulaks - relatively affluent and well-endowed peasants - were persecuted by the Soviet Government as class enemies.

Even poor peasants could have been labeled, i.e., the term was not of economic differentiation, but of a political one. Solzhenitsyn wrote that the term was applied arbitrarily:

In every village, there were people who in one way or another had gotten in the way of local activists. [Following the revolution, it] was the perfect time to settle accounts with them of jealousy, envy, insult. A new word was needed for these new victims as a class- and it was born. By this time it had no 'social' or 'economic' context whatsoever, but it had a marvelous sound: Podkulachnik - 'a person aiding the kulaks.' In other words, I consider you an accomplice of the enemy. And that finishes you. The most tattered laborer in the countryside could quite easily be labeled a podkulachnik.

Valery Vozgrin in his book The History of Crimean Tatars («История крымских татар») wrote basically the same: unlike the term "kulak", the term "podkulachnik" did not have any definite meaning. For example in 1931 the Presidium of Crimean Central Executive Committee could assign a poor peasant into the category of podkulachniks, is he was "a bearer of kulakist-opportunist sentiments". In another case, the whole population of the village of Mangush (now Prokhladnoye) was declared podkulachniks, because the village meeting issued a resolution that that in the village "there are no kulaks nor sedednyaks [moderately well-off peasants]" — all are equal". Vozgrin gives more examples of this kind.

== In other countries ==
In Hungary under Mátyás Rákosi, a podkulachnik was called Kulákbérenc, meaning "kulak hireling".

== See also ==
- Dekulakization
